= List of village-level divisions of Hubei =

Location of Hubei province in China

This is a list of an approximate rendering of the names of the village-level divisions of the province of Hubei, People's Republic of China (PRC) into a romanized form derived from Standard Mandarin Pinyin. After province, prefecture, county-level divisions, and township-level divisions, village-level divisions constitute the formal fifth-level administrative divisions of the PRC. This list is divided first into the prefecture-level, then the county-level divisions, then township-level divisions.

== Wuhan ==
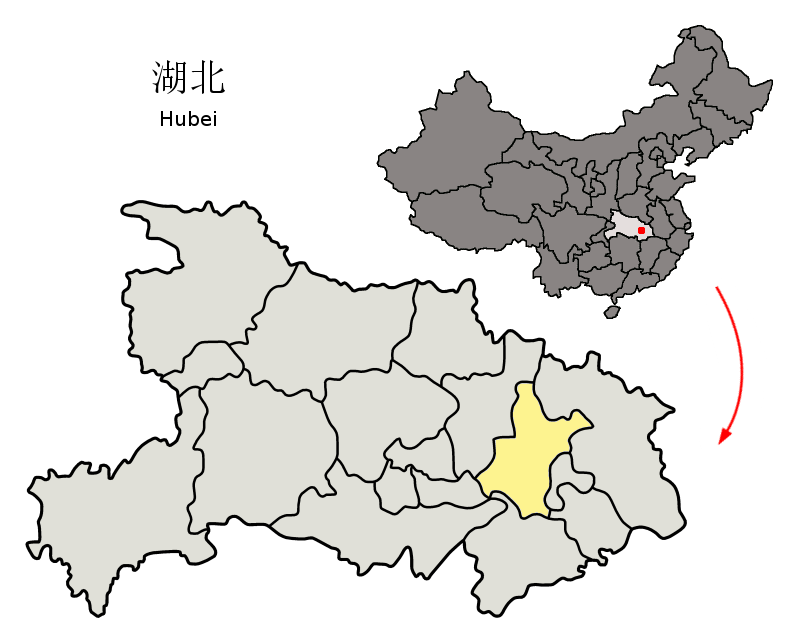
Location of Wuhan in the province

=== Caidian District ===
Subdistricts:

- Caidian Subdistrict (蔡甸街道), Zhashan Subdistrict (奓山街道), Yong'an Subdistrict (永安街道), Zhurushan Subdistrict (侏儒山街道), Daji Subdistrict (大集街道), Zhangwan Subdistrict (张湾街道), Zhuankou Avenue Subdistrict (沌口街街道), Junshan Subdistrict (军山街道)

Towns:

- Suohe (索河镇), Yuxian (玉贤镇)

The only township is Xiaosi Township (消泗乡)

==== Caidian Subdistrict ====
Communities:

- Zhengjie Committee (正街居委会), Hejie (河街社区), Xinfu (新福社区), Sanyi (三义社区), Gongnong (工农社区), Mahao (马号社区), Yuejinqiao (跃进桥社区), Gongjialing (龚家岭社区), Wucengjie (五层街社区), Maoyuan (茂源社区), Zhiyin (知音社区), Luojiashan (罗家山社区)

Villages:

- Sunjiafan (孙家畈村), Chenggong (成功村), Majiadu (马家渡村), Yongli (永利村), Gaomiao (高庙村), Guoli (国利村), Huali (华利村), Hualin (华林村), Yaojialin (姚家林村), Xiwutai (西屋台村), Xinmiao (新庙村), Jianxin (建新村), Tongxin (同心村), Qilian (齐联村), Caidian (蔡甸村), Maolin (茂林村), Hanle (汉乐村)

Other areas:

- Gaomiao Seed Stock Farm (高庙原种场)

==== Zhashan Subdistrict ====
Four communities:

- Zhashan (奓山社区), Zhashanxin (奓山新社区), Xingguang (星光社区), Dadong Community (大东社区)

Thirty-seven villages:

- Dadong Village (大东村), Xiaodong (小东村), Hongyan (红焰村), Xingguang (星光村), Lianyi (联谊村), Lianmeng (联盟村), Qiulin (丘林村), Laoshichen (老世陈村), Luosigang (螺丝岗村), Sanhong (三红村), Tanshu (檀树村), Zhongyuan (中原村), Changxin (长新村), Xiaguang (霞光村), Qianfeng (前峰村), Shuangfeng (双丰村), Zhashan (奓山村), Conglin (丛林村), Xin'anbu (新安堡村), Liuhuan (留环村), Yuanling (袁岭村), Qunyan (群雁村), Dingjiu (丁九村), Yizhi (一致村), Fanli (凡里村), Luojia (罗家村), Chenjia (陈家村), Zhujia (祝家村), Xinsheng (新生村), Sanjiadian (三家店村), Sanyang (三羊村), Minsheng (民生村), Xingli (兴力村), Xinji (新集村), You'ai (友爱村), Qunjian (群建村), Jinniu (金牛村)

==== Yong'an Subdistrict ====
Residential communities:

- Yong'an (永安社区), Jiuzhenshan (九真山社区)

Villages:

- Wanling (万岭村), Yong'an (永安村), Poshu (朴树村), Dongyue (东跃村), Xinliu (新六村), Huayuan (花园村), Lufang (炉房村), Huoyan (火焰村), Tongshantou (桐山头村), Changzheng (长征村), Caohe (曹河村), Laowan (老湾村), Guji (古迹村), Yanwan (严湾村), Shicheng (世城村), Hongcheng (洪城村), Xiangji (向集村), Baimu (柏木村), Yongfeng (永丰村), Gaoxin (高新村), Zhulin (竹林村)

==== Zhurushan Subdistrict ====
Residential communities:

- Zhuru (侏儒社区), Tanshan (檀山社区居委会)

Villages:

- Zhuru (侏儒村), Yangling (杨岭村), Junshan (军山村), Dongshan (东山村), Tujin (土金村), Huangjin (黄金村), Gaodeng (高灯村), Guanling (管岭村), Kuangwan (匡湾村), Zhafang (榨坊村), Tulong (土龙村), Zhongwan (中湾村), Yangwan (阳湾村), Zhongliu (中刘村), Baisai (百赛村), Daiwan (代湾村), Hefeng (合丰村), Zhoumen (周门村), Shentang (神堂村), Gangzui (港咀村), Hengshan (横山村), Baibao (百宝村), Yumen (余门村), Masai (马赛村), Laoguan (老官村), Taidu (太渡村), Tielu (铁炉村), Tudong (土东村), Qianhu (千湖村), Wugong (五公村), Shenghong (胜洪村), Xueshan (薛山村), Jinji (金鸡村), Junying (军营村)

=== Dongxihu District ===
Subdistricts:

- Wujiashan Subdistrict (吴家山街道), Baiquan Subdistrict (柏泉街道), Jiangjun Road Subdistrict (将军路街道), Cihui Subdistrict (慈惠街道), Zoumaling Subdistrict (走马岭街道), Jinghe Subdistrict (径河街道), Changqing Subdistrict (长青街道), Xin'andu Subdistrict (辛安渡街道), Dongshan Subdistrict (东山街道), Changqinghuayuan New Area Subdistrict (常青花园新区街道), Xingouzhen Subdistrict (新沟镇街道), Jinyinhu Subdistrict (金银湖街道)

=== Hannan District ===
Subdistricts:

- Shamao Subdistrict (纱帽街道), Dengnan Subdistrict (邓南街道), Dongjing Subdistrict (东荆街道), Xiangkou Subdistrict (湘口街道)

=== Hanyang District ===
Subdistricts:

- Jianqiao Subdistrict (建桥街道), Longyang Subdistrict (龙阳街道), Sixin Subdistrict (四新街道), Qingchuan Subdistrict (晴川街街道), Yingwu Subdistrict (鹦鹉街道), Zhoutou Subdistrict (洲头街道), Wulidun Subdistrict (五里墩街道), Qinduankou Subdistrict (琴断口街道), Jianghan'erqiao Subdistrict (江汉二桥街道), Yongfeng Subdistrict (永丰街道), Jiangdi Subdistrict (江堤街道)

Areas:

- Hanyang Economic Development Zone 汉阳经济开发区, Sixin Area 四新地区

=== Hongshan District ===
Subdistricts:

- Luonan Subdistrict (珞南街道), Guanshan Subdistrict (关山街道), Shizishan Subdistrict (狮子山街道), Zhangjiawan Subdistrict (张家湾街道), Liyuan Subdistrict (梨园街道), Zhuodaoquan Subdistrict (卓刀泉街道), Hongshan Subdistrict (洪山街道), Heping Subdistrict (和平街道), Qingling Subdistrict (青菱街道), Huashan Subdistrict (花山街道), Zuoling Subdistrict (左岭街道), Jiufeng Subdistrict (九峰街道), Guandong Subdistrict (关东街道), Jianshe Subdistrict (建设街道), Donghu Scenic Area Subdistrict (东湖风景区街道)

The only township is Tianxing Township (天兴乡)

==== Guanshan Subdistrict ====
Twenty-eight communities:

- Haihe (海核社区), Nanwang (南望社区), Youkeyuan (邮科院社区), Hudian (湖电社区), Qibiao (汽标社区), Zhongnan Caijing Zhengfa Daxue Nanhu (中南财经政法大学南湖社区), Zisong (紫菘社区), Minda (民大社区- South Central University for Nationalities), Fangda (纺大社区- Wuhan Textile University 武汉纺织大学), Guanshankou (关山口社区), Qifa (汽发社区), Yangguang (阳光社区), Yijinghuating (逸景华庭社区), Guannan (关南社区), Lumolu (鲁磨路社区), Changjiang (长江社区), Dida (地大社区- China University of Geosciences), Long'an (龙安社区), Kangjuyuan (康居园社区), Bishui (碧水社区), Geguang (葛光社区), Xuefu (学府社区), Jianqiaochuntian (剑桥春天社区), Baoli (保利社区), Zhihuicheng (智慧城社区), Fenglinshangcheng (枫林上城社区), Yangchun (阳春社区), Huazhong Keji Daxue (华中科技大学社区- Huazhong University of Science and Technology)

==== Shizishan Subdistrict ====
Thirteen subdistricts:

- Huanongdong (华农东社区), Huanongxi (华农西社区), Luoshilu (珞狮路社区), Shengnongkeyuan (省农科院社区), Tonghui (通惠社区), Qiyi'ersuo (七一二所社区), Hugong (湖工社区), Wunantielu (武南铁路社区), Shinan (狮南社区), Nanhushanzhuang (南湖山庄社区), Meiguiwan (玫瑰湾社区), Shuchenglu (书城路社区), Luojiayayuan (珞珈雅苑社区)

=== Huangpi District ===
Subdistricts:

- Qianchuan Subdistrict (前川街道), Qijiawan Subdistrict (祁家湾街道), Hengdian Subdistrict (横店街道), Luohansi Subdistrict (罗汉寺街道), Shekou Subdistrict (滠口街道), Liuzhidian Subdistrict (六指店街道), Tianhe Subdistrict (天河街道), Wangjiahe Subdistrict (王家河街道), Changxuanling Subdistrict (长轩岭街道), Liji Subdistrict (李集街道), Yaoji Subdistrict (姚集街道), Caizha Subdistrict (蔡榨街道), Wuhu Subdistrict (武湖街道)

The only town is Sanli (三里镇)

Townships:

- Caidian Township (蔡店乡), Mulan Township (木兰乡)

=== Jiang'an District ===
Subdistricts:

- Dazhi Subdistrict (大智街道), Yiyuan Subdistrict (一元街道), Chezhan Subdistrict (车站街道), Siwei Subdistrict (四唯街道), Yongqing Subdistrict (永清街道), Xima Subdistrict (西马街道), Qiuchang Subdistrict (球场街道), Laodong Subdistrict (劳动街道), Erqi Subdistrict (二七街道), Xincun Subdistrict (新村街道), Danshuichi Subdistrict (丹水池街道), Taibei Subdistrict (台北街道), Huaqiao Subdistrict (花桥街道), Shenjiaji Subdistrict

Other Areas:

- Houhu Office (后湖街办事处), Tazihu Office (塔子湖街办事处)

==== Yiyuan Subdistrict ====
Communities:

- Yuefei (岳飞社区), Tongxing (同兴社区), Sanyang (三阳社区), Kunhou (坤厚社区), Tianjin (天津社区), Yangzi (扬子社区), Tongfu (同福社区), Dongting (洞庭社区)

==== Chezhan Subdistrict (Jiang'an) ====
Communities:

- Huaqing (华清社区), Chang'an (长安社区), Sande (三德社区), Futang (辅堂社区), Furen (辅仁社区)

=== Jianghan District ===
Thirteen subdistricts:

- Minzu Subdistrict (民族街道), Hualou Subdistrict (花楼街道), Shuita Subdistrict (水塔街道), Minquan Subdistrict (民权街道), Manchun Subdistrict (满春街道), Minyi Subdistrict (民意街道), Xinhua Subdistrict (新华街道), Wansong Subdistrict (万松街道), Tangjiadun Subdistrict (唐家墩街道), Beihu Subdistrict (北湖街道), Qianjin Subdistrict (前进街道), Changqing Subdistrict (常青街道), Hanxing Subdistrict (汉兴街道)

=== Jiangxia District ===
Subdistricts:

- Zhifang Subdistrict (纸坊街道), Jinkou Subdistrict (金口街道), Wulongquan Subdistrict (乌龙泉街道), Zhengdian Subdistrict (郑店街道), Liufang Subdistrict (流芳街道), Wulijie Subdistrict (五里界街道), Jinshui Subdistrict (金水街道), Anshan Subdistrict (安山街道), Shanpo Subdistrict (山坡街道), Fozuling Subdistrict (佛祖岭街道), Baoxie Subdistrict (豹澥街道), Binhu Subdistrict (滨湖街道)

Towns:

- Fasi (法泗镇), Husi (湖泗镇)

The only township is Shu'an Township (舒安乡)

=== Qiaokou District ===
Eleven subdistricts:

- Gutian Subdistrict (古田街道), Hanjiadun Subdistrict (韩家墩街道), Zongguan Subdistrict (宗关街道), Hanshuiqiao Subdistrict (汉水桥街道), Baofeng Subdistrict (宝丰街道), Ronghua Subdistrict (荣华街道), Hanzhong Subdistrict (汉中街道), Hanzheng Subdistrict (汉正街道), Liujiaoting Subdistrict (六角亭街道), Changfeng Subdistrict (长丰街道), Yijia Subdistrict (易家街道)

=== Qingshan District ===
Subdistricts:

- Hongwei Road Subdistrict (红卫路街道), Yejin Subdistrict (冶金街道), Xingouqiao Subdistrict (新沟桥街道), Honggangcheng Subdistrict (红钢城街道), Gongrencun Subdistrict (工人村街道), Qingshanzhen Subdistrict (青山镇街道), Changqian Subdistrict (厂前街道), Wudong Subdistrict (武东街道), Baiyushan Subdistrict (白玉山街道), Ganghuacun Subdistrict (钢花村街道), Gangduhuayuan Subdistrict (钢都花园街道管委会)

Other: Beihu Administrative Committee Subdistrict (北湖管委会街道)

=== Wuchang District ===
Fifteen subdistricts:

- Jiyuqiao Subdistrict (积玉桥街道), Yangyuan Subdistrict (杨园街道), Xujiapeng Subdistrict (徐家棚街道), Liangdao Subdistrict (粮道街道), Zhonghualu Subdistrict (中华路街道), Huanghelou Subdistrict (黄鹤楼街道), Ziyang Subdistrict (紫阳街道), Baishazhou Subdistrict (白沙洲街道), Shouyilu Subdistrict (首义路街道), Zhongnanlu Subdistrict (中南路街道), Shuiguohu Subdistrict (水果湖街道), Luojiashan Subdistrict (珞珈山街道), Shidong Subdistrict (石洞街道), Nanhu Subdistrict (南湖街道), Donghu Scenic Area Subdistrict (东湖风景区街道)

=== Xinzhou District ===
Subdistricts:

- Zhucheng Subdistrict (邾城街道), Yangluo Subdistrict (阳逻街道), Cangbu Subdistrict (仓埠街道), Wangji Subdistrict (汪集街道), Liji Subdistrict (李集街道), Sandian Subdistrict (三店街道), Pantang Subdistrict (潘塘街道), Jiujie Subdistrict (旧街街道), Shuangliu Subdistrict (双柳街道), Zhangduhu Subdistrict (涨渡湖街道)

Towns:

- Xinchong (辛冲镇), Xugu (徐古镇), Fenghuang (凤凰镇)

==== Zhucheng Subdistrict ====
Twenty-two communities:

- Hongqi (红旗社区), Nanjie (南街社区), Xinjian (新建社区), Wenhua (文化社区), Xingfu (幸福社区), Dong'an (东安社区), Huangmao (黄茂社区), Zhangnan (章南社区), Fenghuangtai (凤凰台社区), Qing'an (清安社区), Caihao (蔡濠社区), Liuji (刘集居委会), Xuefu (学府社区), Xiangyang (向阳社区), Guangming (光明社区), Longcheng (龙城社区), Chengnan (城南社区), Zhanglin (章林社区), Xiangdong (向东社区), Chengdong (城东社区), Changxin (常新社区), Xiangyan (祥燕社区)

Thirty-six villages:

- Chengbei (城北村), Luofan (骆畈村), Zhongyang (钟杨村), Yuyao (余姚村), Longqiao (龙桥村), Shengying (胜英村), Dengfeng (登峰村), Gugang (顾岗村), Bashan (巴山村), Hongfeng (红峰村), Liuliu (刘六村), Meidian (梅店村), Tielong (铁衖村), Zhangxing (章兴村), Chenghu (程湖村), Yongli (永立村), Zhangcheng (章程村), Baxu (巴徐村), Dadu (大渡村), Raocai (饶蔡村), Chengxi (城西村), Tiejia (铁甲村), Chenxian (陈先村), Qianzhai (钱寨村), Taoliu (陶刘村), Liuji (刘集村), Xiaoqiao (肖桥村), Zhanhe (詹河村), Wubang (吴榜村), Xingang (新港村), Qiuqiao (邱桥村), Yiyao (易窑村), Donggang (东港村), Zhanqiao (站桥村), Lianhe (联合村), Poyue (破月村)

Other area:

- Lianhe Agricultural Research Center (联合农科所生活区)

== Enshi Tujia and Miao Autonomous Prefecture ==
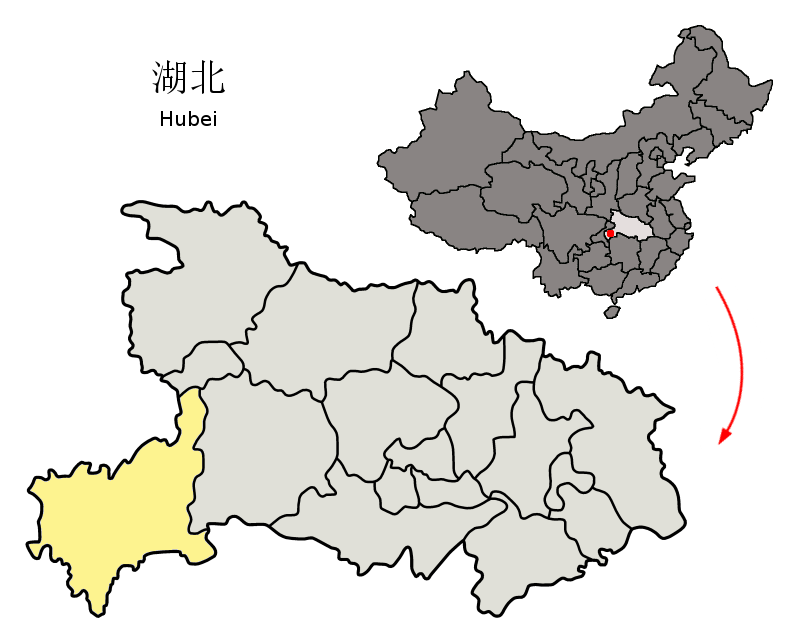
Location of Enshi Tujia and Miao Autonomous Prefecture in the province

=== Enshi City ===
Subdistricts:

- Wuyangba Subdistrict (舞阳坝街道), Liujiaoting Subdistrict (六角亭街道), Xiaoduchuan Subdistrict (小渡船街道)

Towns:

- Longfeng (龙凤镇), Cuiba (崔坝镇), Banqiao (板桥镇)

Townships:

- Sancha Township (三岔乡), Xintang Township (新塘乡), Hongtu Township (红土乡), Shadi Township (沙地乡), Baiyangping Township (白杨坪乡), Taiyanghe Township (太阳河乡), Tunbao Township (屯堡乡), Baiguo Township (白果乡), Bajiao Dong Ethnic Township (芭蕉侗族乡), Shengjiaba Township (盛家坝乡)

=== Lichuan ===
Subdistricts:

- Duting Subdistrict (都亭街道), Dongcheng Subdistrict (东城街道)

Towns:

- Moudao (谋道镇), Baiyangba (柏杨坝镇), Wangying (汪营镇), Jiannan (建南镇), Zhonglu (忠路镇), Tuanbao (团堡镇)

Townships:

- Liangwu Township (凉雾乡), Yuanbao Township (元堡乡), Nanping Township (南坪乡), Wendou Township (文斗乡), Maoba Township (毛坝乡), Shaxi Township (沙溪乡)

==== Zhonglu ====
One residential community:

- Longqu (龙渠居委会)

Sixty villages:

- Honghua, Fanshen, Chatai, Hexin, Qilong, Shuangmiao, Guihua, Zonghe, Tianwan, Hongsha, Zhuba, Zhongling, Nongke, Xiaping, Xiaohe, Gongqiao, Yangjiapo, Xiangyang, Paomu, Xiaoping, Huilong, Dongfeng, Xiaba, Fengle, Shipan, Basheng, Longtang, Zhaipo, Muba, Jinyan, Xilin, Ganxi, Xinjian, Huangla, Fenghuang, Xinglong, Chengchi, Pianqian, Taiping, Jiangyuan, Shaping, Hujiatang, Heilin, Lizhi, Mitanxi, Laowuji, Heli, Hongling, Pingxing, Jinxiu, Liangfeng, Shuanghe, Qingping, Chenggan, Yongxing, Lishan, Minzhu, Chayuan, Shuangzhai, Jinyin

=== Badong County ===
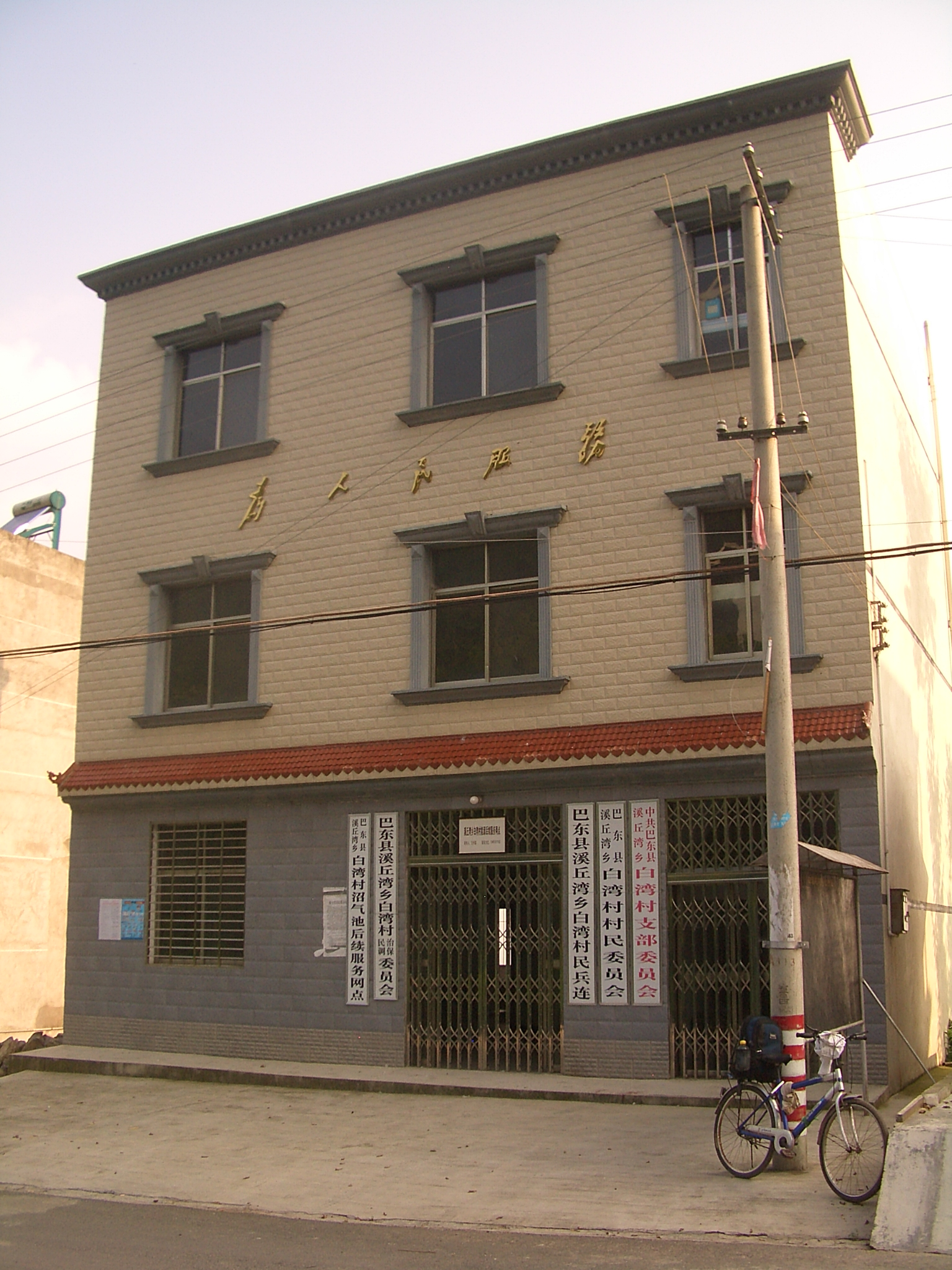
Government offices of Baishawan village, in Xiqiuwan Township, Badong County, Hubei

Towns:

- Badong (信陵镇), Dongrang/nangkou (东瀼口镇), Yanduhe (沿渡河镇), Guandukou (官渡口镇), Chadianzi (茶店子镇), Lücongpo (绿葱坡镇), Dazhiping (大支坪镇), Yesanguan (野三关镇), Shuibuya (水布垭镇), Qingtaiping (清太坪镇)

Townships:

- Xiqiuwan Township (溪丘湾乡), Jinguoping Township (金果坪乡)

=== Hefeng County ===
Towns:

- Zouma (走马镇), Rongmei (容美镇)

Townships:

- Tielu Township (铁炉乡), Wuli Township (五里乡), Yanzi Township (燕子乡), Xiaping Township (下坪乡), Wuyang Township (邬阳乡), Zhongying Township (中营乡), Taiping Township (太平乡)

=== Jianshi County ===
Towns:

- Yezhou (业州镇), Gaoping (高坪镇), Hongyansi (红岩寺镇), Jingyang (景阳镇), Guandian (官店镇), Huaping (花坪镇)

Townships:

- Changliang Township (长梁乡), Maotian Township (茅田乡), Longping Township (龙坪乡), Sanli Township (三里乡)

=== Laifeng County ===
Towns:

- Xiangfeng (翔凤镇), Baifusi (百福司镇), Dahe (大河镇)

Townships:

- Lüshui Township (绿水乡), Manshui Township (漫水乡), Jiusi Township (旧司乡), Geleche Township (革勒车乡), Sanhu Township (三胡乡)

=== Xianfeng County ===
Towns:

- Gaoleshan (高乐山镇), Zhongbao (忠堡镇), Jiamachi (甲马池镇), Chaoyangsi (朝阳寺镇), Qingping (清坪镇), Tangya (唐崖镇)

Townships:

- Dingzhai Township (丁寨乡), Huolongping Township (活龙坪乡), Xiaocun Township (小村乡), Huangjindong Township (黄金洞乡)

=== Xuan'en County ===
Towns:

- Zhushan (珠山镇), Jiaoyuan (椒园镇), Shadaogou (沙道沟镇)

Townships:

- Wanzhai Township (万寨乡), Changtanhe Dong Ethnic Township (长潭河侗族乡), Lijiahe Township (李家河乡), Xiaoguan Dong Ethnic Township (晓关侗族乡), Gaoluo Township (高罗乡), Chunmuying Township (椿木营乡)

== Ezhou ==
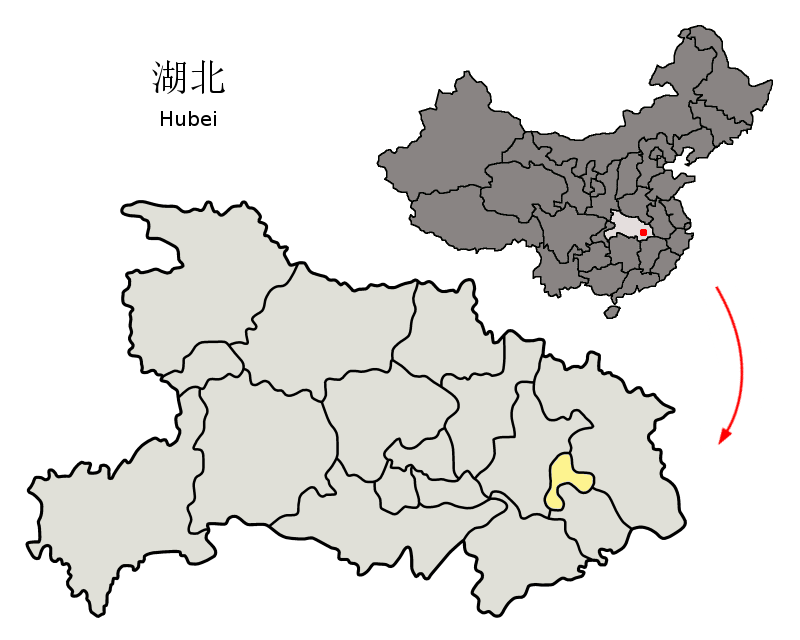
Location of Ezhou in the province

=== Echeng District ===
Four subdistricts:

- Fenghuang Subdistrict (凤凰街道), Gulou Subdistrict (古楼街道), Xishan Subdistrict (西山街道), Fankou Subdistrict (樊口街道)

'Nine towns:'

==== Bishi ====
1 residential committee and 10 villages in Bishi
1 residential committee	Wugang Kuangshan Jixiu 武钢矿山机修居委会
10 villages	Bishi 碧石村, Hongqiao 虹桥村, Huangzui 黄咀村, Jinpen 金盆村, Jinwenwu 金文武村, Libian |李边村 (李家边村), Lijing 李镜村, Luwan 卢湾村, N/Longhuishan 农会山村(龙会山村), Zhangshuling 樟术岭村

==== Shawo Township ====
11 villages in Shawo Township
11 villages	Baotuan 保团村 Caopi 草陂村 Huqiao 胡桥村 Huangshan 黄山村 Jiajiang 加奖村 Pailou 牌楼村 Shawo 沙窝村 Xinwan 新湾村 Yuba 渔坝村 Zhaozhai 赵寨村 Zouma 走马村

=== Huarong District ===
Three towns:

- Huarong (华容镇), Miaoling (庙岭镇), Duandian (段店镇)

Two townships:

- Linjiang (临江乡), Putuan (蒲团乡)

=== Liangzihu District ===
Five towns:

- Taihe (太和镇), Donggou (东沟镇), Liangzi Wildlife Management Area (梁子镇/梁子生态管理区), Tujianao (涂家垴镇), Zhaoshan (沼山镇)

== Huanggang ==
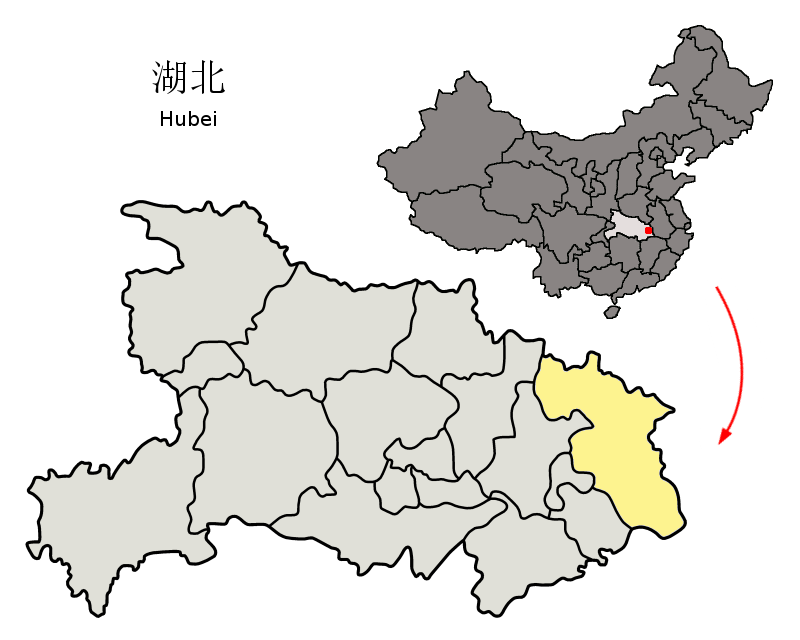
Location of Huanggang in the province

=== Huangzhou District ===
Four subdistricts:

- Chibi Subdistrict (赤壁街道), Donghu Subdistrict (东湖街道), Yuwang Subdistrict (禹王街道), Nanhu Subdistrict (南湖街道)

Three towns:

- Lukou (路口镇), Ducheng (堵城镇), Chencelou (陈策楼镇)

The only township is Taodian Township (陶店乡).

One other area:

- Railway Station Economic Development Area (火车站经济开发区)

=== Macheng ===
Subdistricts:

- Longchiqoao Subdistrict (龙池桥街道), Gulou Subdistrict (鼓楼街道), Nanhu Subdistrict (南湖街道)

Towns:

- Zhongguanyi (中馆驿镇), Songbu (宋埠镇), Qiting (歧亭镇), Baiguo (白果镇), Fuzihe (夫子河镇), Yanjiahe (阎家河镇), Guishan (龟山镇), Yantianhe (盐田河镇), Zhangjiafan (张家畈镇), Muzidian (木子店镇), Sanhekou (三河口镇), Huangtugang (黄土岗镇), Futianhe (福田河镇), C/Shengmagang (乘马岗镇), Shunhe (顺河镇)

The only township is Tiemengang (铁门岗乡).

One other area: Macheng Economic Development Zone (麻城经济开发区)

=== Wuxue ===
Four subdistricts:

- Wuxue Subdistrict (武穴街道), Kanjiang Subdistrict (刊江街道), Tianjiazhen Subdistrict (Tianzhen) (田家镇街道), Wanzhanghu Subdistrict (万丈湖街道)

Eight towns

==== Meichuan ====
Meichuan administers:

NBS Area No.	Name (Mand.)	Chinese (Simp.)
Communities
421182100002	Chenghuangmiao City God Temple	城隍庙社区
421182100003	Zhenxing	振兴社区
421182100004	Sangziyuan	桑梓园社区
421182100005	Meipu	梅浦社区
421182100006	Shiniu	石牛社区
421182100008	Jugang	居杠社区
Villages
421182100200	Congzheng	从政村
421182100203	Lingshan	灵山村
421182100204	Yangwan	杨塆村
421182100205	Wulipo	五里坡村
421182100206	Wangsheng	王胜村
421182100207	Baishi	白石村
421182100208	Zhanghuan	张焕村
421182100209	Xiacheng	下程村
421182100210	Tonggu	铜鼓村
421182100211	Shilipu	十里铺村
421182100212	Lixingsi	李兴泗村
421182100213	Luolin	罗林村
421182100214	Baofa	包法村
421182100215	Qiaotou	桥头村
421182100216	Kunlong	困龙村
421182100217	Zouma	走马村
421182100218	Fanbaishu	范柏树下村
421182100219	Ruanjiaxiang	阮家巷村
421182100220	Fanyingyou	范应佑村
421182100221	Wufuqi	吴伏七村
421182100222	Yongxi	永西村
421182100223	Huzheng	胡政村
421182100224	Wanglei	王埒村
421182100225	Jienianzi	解念兹村
421182100226	Luzizhen	卢子珍村
421182100227	Jiejinpo	解金坡村
421182100228	Lüxingzu	吕兴祖村
421182100229	Luquan’er	鲁全二村
421182100230	Tashuiqiao	塔水桥村
421182100231	Lishan	栗山村
421182100232	Huli	胡立村
421182100233	Yangpu	杨铺村
421182100234	Chenfulu	陈福禄村
421182100235	Sihe	思河村
421182100236	Zhangsiji	张思济村
421182100237	Chaji	插箕村
421182100238	Ganshannao	干山垴村
421182100239	Wufan	吴畈村
421182100240	Shiniu	石牛村
421182100241	Shichuan	石船村
421182100242	X/Jienao	解垴村
421182100243	Liyun’er	李云二村
421182100244	Xianrenkou	仙人口村
421182100245	Nan	南村
421182100246	Songlin	宋林村
421182100247	Shouyi	受益村
421182100248	Zhaojun	赵俊村
421182100249	Yueshan	岳山村
421182100250	Guotan	郭坦村
421182100251	Wuda	吴大村
421182100252	Songchong	宋冲村
421182100253	Heyelin	荷叶林村
421182100254	Lulin	绿林村
421182100255	Fengkou	峰口村
421182100256	Tongxin	同心村
421182100257	Xiazhao	下赵村
421182100258	Guanshan	观山村
421182100259	Quankou	泉口村
421182100260	Changlingcun	长岭村
421182100261	Zhangdexian	张德先村
421182100262	Wanggui	王贵村
421182100263	Zhangpai	张牌村
421182100264	Juwensheng	居文胜村
421182100265	Malong	马垅村
421182100266	Shanghao	上郝村
421182100267	Taosi	陶斯村
421182100268	Fanghong	方洪村
421182100269	Jugang	居杠村
421182100270	Liuchang	刘昌村
421182100271	Raoweishi	饶为市村
421182100272	Cailin	蔡林村
421182100273	Pangudang	盘古垱村
421182100274	Hudaozhang	胡导章村
421182100275	Lüsifang	吕四房村
421182100276	Xialiu	夏柳村
421182100277	Siguta	司古塔村
421182100278	Huilong	回垅村
421182100279	Ruanjialang	阮家廊村
421182100280	Siji	思济村

==== Yuchuan (余川镇) ====
Huaqiao (花桥镇), Dajin (大金镇), Shifosi (石佛寺镇), Siwang (四望镇), Dafasi (大法寺镇), Longping (龙坪镇)

=== Hong'an County ===
Towns:

- Chengguan (城关镇), Qiliping (七里坪镇), Huajiahe (华家河镇), Ercheng (二程镇), Shangxinji (上新集镇), Gaoqiao (高桥镇), Mi'ersi (觅儿寺镇), Baliwan (八里湾镇), Taipingqiao (太平桥镇), Yongjiahe (永佳河镇)

Other Areas:

- Huolianfan Tea Farm (火连畈茶场), Tiantaishan Scenic Area (天台山风景区管理处)

==== Xinghua Township ====
The only township is Xinghua Township (杏花乡)

NBS Area No.	Name (from Mand.)	Chinese (Simp.)
Communities
421122200001	Jiansu	建苏社区
421122200002	Peicheng	培城社区
421122200003	Jieguanting	接官厅社区
421122200004	Dongfeng	东风社区
421122200005	Xinghuacun	杏花村社区
421122200006	Wufenggang	五丰岗社区
Villages
421122200201	Jiansu	建苏村
421122200202	Peicheng	培城村
421122200203	Dongmen	东门村
421122200204	Dongfeng	东风村
421122200205	Xinghua	杏花村
421122200206	Xingguang	星光村
421122200207	Shuguang	曙光村
421122200208	Kui/Weidian	隗店村
421122200209	Yixin	益心村
421122200210	Honghuachong	红花冲村
421122200211	Wangxiangfan	王祥畈村
421122200212	Guoshoujiu	郭受九村
421122200213	Doubuhe	陡步河村
421122200214	Zhangshan	嶂山村
421122200215	Lijiachong	李家冲村
421122200216	Wuyunshan	五云山村
421122200217	Paifangdian	牌坊店村
421122200218	Changshan	长山村
421122200219	Liushike	刘世科村
421122200220	Xujiabian	许家边村
421122200221	Meiying	梅英村
421122200222	Wangjia	汪家村
421122200223	Longtansi	龙潭寺村
421122200224	Lixi	李西村
421122200225	Liuhe	浏河村
421122200226	Liangdaoqiao	两道桥村
421122200227	Zhanghe	张河村
421122200228	Shizi	狮子村
421122200229	Mabang	马榜村
421122200230	Bailuo	百罗村
421122200231	Shouyi	受益村
421122200232	Baiguoshu	白果树村
421122200233	Huayuan	花园村
421122200234	Changzhu	长竹村
421122200235	Dou'an	陡岸村
421122200236	Bo'an	剥岸村
421122200237	Ehua	娥花村
421122200238	Gaosheng	高升村
421122200239	Dongsheng	东升村
421122200240	Lianggang	凉岗村
421122200241	Jinghua	精华村
421122200242	Eshan	娥山村
421122200501	Shucai	蔬菜村

=== Huangmei County ===
Twelve towns:

- Huangmei (黄梅镇), Konglong (孔垄镇), Xiaochi (小池镇), Xiaxin (下新镇), Dahe (大河镇), Tingqian (停前镇), Wuzu (五祖镇), Zhuogang (濯港镇), Caishan (蔡山镇), Xinkai (新开镇), Dushan (独山镇), Fenlu (分路镇)

Four townships:

- Liulin Township (柳林乡), Shamu Township (杉木乡), Kuzhu Township (苦竹乡), Liuzuo Township (刘佐乡)

=== Luotian County ===
Ten towns:

- Fengshan (凤山镇), Luotuo'ao (骆驼坳镇), Dahe'an (大河岸镇), Jiuzihe (九资河镇), Shengli (胜利镇), Hepu (河铺镇), Sanlifan (三里畈镇), Kuanghe (匡河镇) (formerly a township 乡), Baimiaohe (白庙河镇) (formerly a township 乡), Daqi (大崎镇) (formerly a township 乡)

Two townships:

- Bailianhe Township (白莲河乡), Pinghu Township (平湖乡)

=== Qichun County ===
Thirteen towns:

- Caohe (漕河镇), Chidong (赤东镇), Qizhou (蕲州镇), Guanyao (管窑镇), Pengsi (彭思镇), Hengche (横车镇), Zhulin (株林镇), Liuhe (刘河镇), Shizi (狮子镇), Qingshi (青石镇), Zhangbang (张塝镇), Datong (大同镇), Tanlin (檀林镇)

The only township is Xiangqiao Township (向桥乡)

One other area: Balihu (八里湖)

=== Tuanfeng County ===
Eight towns:

- Tuanfeng (团风镇), Linshanhe (淋山河镇), Fanggaoping (方高坪镇), Huilongshan (回龙山镇), Macaomiao (马曹庙镇), Shangbahe (上巴河镇), Zongluzui (总路咀镇), Dandian (但店镇)

Two townships:

- Gu/Jiamiao Township (贾庙乡), Dupi Township (杜皮乡)

=== Xishui County ===
Twelve towns:

- Qingquan (清泉镇), Bahe (巴河镇), Zhuwa (竹瓦镇), Wanggang (汪岗镇), Tuanpi (团陂镇), Guankou (关口镇), Bailian (白莲镇), Caihe (蔡河镇), Xianma (洗马镇), Dingsidang (丁司垱镇), Sanhua (散花镇), Lanxi (兰溪镇)

The only township is Lüyang Township (绿杨乡)

Three other areas: Sanjiaoshan Forestry Area (三角山林场), Cehu Breeding Farm (策湖养殖场), Xishui Economic Development Zone (经济开发区)

=== Yingshan County ===
Eight towns:

==== Wenquan (温泉镇) ====
Communities:

- Bisheng 毕升社区, Dongmen 东门社区, Jiming 鸡鸣社区, Lingyuan 陵园社区, Chengbei 城北社区

Villages

- Lianhua 莲花村, Baishi'ao 白石坳村, Po'ernao 坡儿垴村, Xitanghe 西汤河村, Beitanghe 北汤河村, Huayuan 花园村, Gantang'ao 甘塘坳村, Maqian 马堑村, Danaozhai 大垴寨村, Jiangjunshan 将军山村, Shanxi'ao 山溪坳村, Jinjiaqiao 金家桥村, Xiaomifan 小米畈村, Meijiayan 梅家岩村, Doumifan 斗米畈村, Liulinhe 柳林河村, Shelongjian 蛇龙尖村, Majia'ao 马家坳村, Yangshugou 杨树沟村, Huangboshan 黄柏山村, Baijianhe 百笕河村, Fengshupai 枫树排村, Chenhe 陈河村, Shangma'ao 上马坳村, Ma'anzhai 马鞍寨村, Maocao'ao 茅草坳村, Baizhanghe 百丈河村, Xieshuiyan 泻水岩村, Yitianmen 一天门村, Heishitou 黑石头村, Longtanfan 龙潭畈村, Qiliyan 七里岩村, Shawanhe 沙塆河村, Taofang 陶坊村, Chishuichong 赤水冲村, Zhaojiafan 赵家畈村, Shimenchong 石门冲村, Pengfan 彭畈村, Baishuci 柏树祠村, Huangzhushan 黄竹山村, Xiabeichong 下贝冲村, Xichong 西冲村, Tafan 塔畈村, Qiangjiawan 羌家塆村, Chongshanpu || 崇山铺村, Jilinggou 季陵沟村, Shucai 蔬菜村, Jiulongkou 九垄口村, Nanchongfan 南冲畈村.

==== Yangliuwan (杨柳湾镇) ====
Three townships:

==== Taojiahe Township (陶家河乡) ====
Four other areas:

- Taohuachong Forestry Area (桃花冲林场), Wujiashan Forestry Area (吴家山林场), Wufengshan Forestry Area (五峰山林场), Yingshan County Economic Development District (英山县经济开发区)

== Huangshi ==
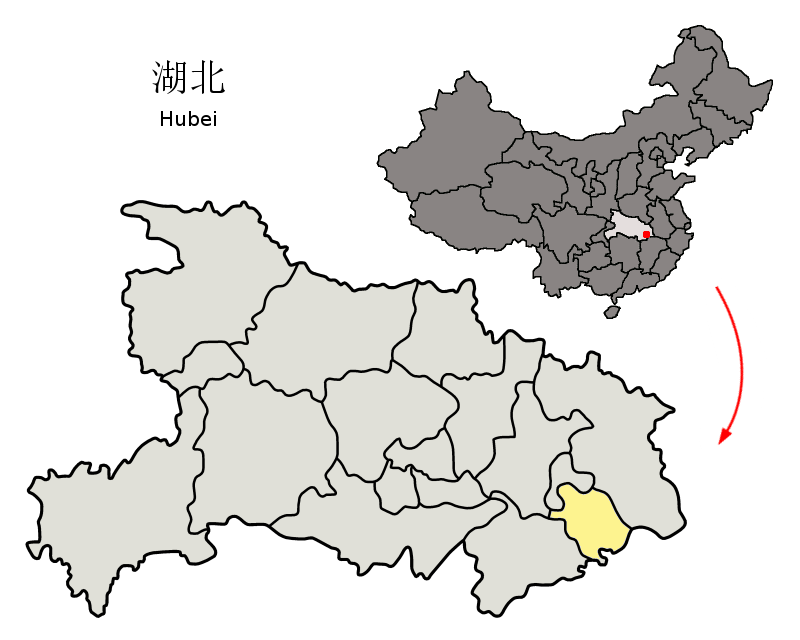
Location of Huangshi in the province

=== Huangshigang District ===
Subdistricts:

- Shenjiaying Subdistrict (沈家营街道), Huangshigang Subdistrict (黄石港街道), Hongqiqiao Subdistrict (红旗桥街道), Shengyanggang Subdistrict (胜阳港街道), Huahu Subdistrict (花湖街道)

=== Tieshan District ===
The only administrative direct subdivision is a town-simulating village (区直辖村模拟镇).

=== Xialu District ===
The only subdistrict is Tuanchengshan Subdistrict (团城山街道)

=== Xisaishan District ===
Subdistricts:

- Linjiang Subdistrict (临江街道), Baquan Subdistrict (八泉街道), Chenjiawan Subdistrict (陈家湾街道), Chengyue Subdistrict (澄月街道), Huangsiwan Subdistrict (黄思湾街道), Xisaishan Subdistrict (西塞山街道)

The only town is Hekou (河口镇)

=== Daye ===
Subdistricts:

- Dongyue Road Subdistrict (东岳路街道), Jinhu Subdistrict (金湖街道), Luojiaqiao Subdistrict (罗家桥街道), Jinshan Subdistrict (金山街道)

Towns:

- Jinniu (金牛镇), Bao'an (保安镇), Lingxiang (灵乡镇), Jinshandian (金山店镇), Haidiqiao (还地桥镇), Yinzu (殷祖镇), Liurenba (刘仁八镇), Chengui (陈贵镇), Dajipu (大箕铺镇), Wangren (汪仁镇)

The only township is Mingshan Township (茗山乡)

==== Jinshan Subdistrict (金山街道) ====
Communities

- 四棵, 王太, 鹏程, 金山

Villages

- 金山, 宝山, 钟山, 圣水泉, 路平, 鹏程, 王坛, 大路, 四棵, 新农, 明港, 王太, 张冲, 路东

=== Yangxin County ===
Towns:

- Xingguo (兴国镇), Fuchi (富池镇), Huangsangkou (黄颡口镇), Weiyuankou (韦源口镇), Taizi (太子镇), Dawang (大王镇), Taogang (陶港镇), Baisha (白沙镇), Futu (浮屠镇), Sanxi (三溪镇), Yanggang (洋港镇), Paishi (排市镇), Mugang (木港镇), Fenglin (枫林镇), Wangying (王英镇)

== Jingmen ==
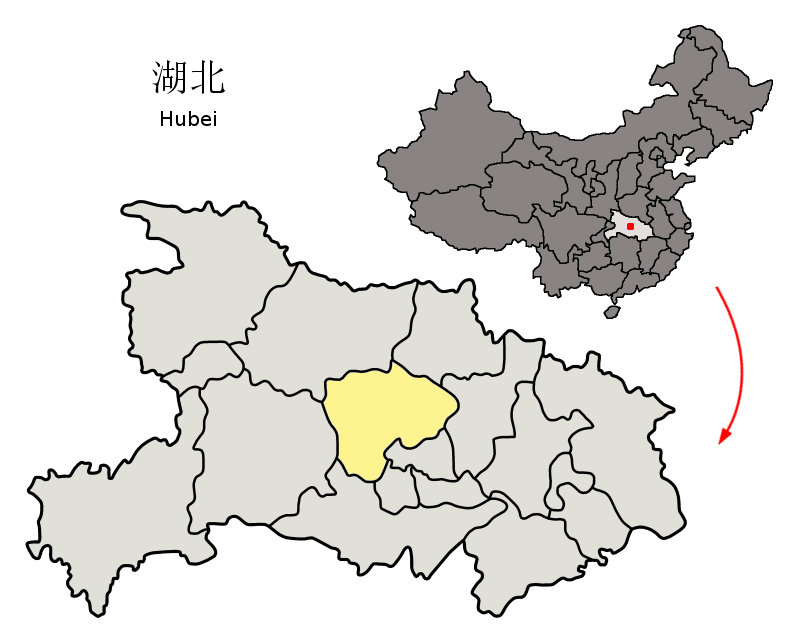
Location of Jingmen in the province

=== Dongbao District ===
Subdistricts:

- Longquan Subdistrict (龙泉街道), Quankou Subdistrict (泉口街道)

Towns:

- Lixi (栗溪镇), Ziling (子陵镇), Zhanghe (漳河镇), Mahe (马河镇), Shiqiaoyi (石桥驿镇), Pailou (牌楼镇)

The only township is Xianju Township (仙居乡)

=== Duodao District ===
Subdistricts:

- Duodao Subdistrict (掇刀街道), Baimiao Subdistrict (白庙街道)

Towns:

- Tuanlipu (团林铺镇), Macheng (麻城镇)

=== Zhongxiang ===
The only subdistrict is Yingzhong Subdistrict (郢中街道)

Towns:

- Yangzi (洋梓镇), Changshou (长寿镇), Fengle (丰乐镇), Huji (胡集镇), Shuanghe (双河镇), Linkuang (磷矿镇), Wenji (文集镇), Lengshui (冷水镇), Shipai (石牌镇), Jiukou (旧口镇), Chaihu (柴湖镇), Changtan (长滩镇), Dongqiao (东桥镇), Kedian (客店镇), Zhangji (张集镇)

The only township is Jiuli Township (九里乡)

=== Jingshan County ===
Towns:

- Xinshi (新市镇), Yongxing (永兴镇), Caowu (曹武镇), Luodian (罗店镇), Songhe (宋河镇), Pingba (坪坝镇), Sanyang (三阳镇), Lülin (绿林镇), Yangji (杨集镇), Sunqiao (孙桥镇), Shilong (石龙镇), Yonglong (永漋镇), Yanmenkou (雁门口镇), Qianchang (钱场镇)

==== Xinshi ====
Communities:

- Yundu (云杜社区), Wenbifeng (文笔峰社区), Zhonggulou (钟鼓楼社区), Sanjiaozhou (三角洲社区), Guihuatai (桂花台社区), Dongguan (东关社区), Chengfan (城畈社区), Xinyang (新阳社区), Fenghuangyan (凤凰堰社区)

Villages:

- Gaochao (高潮村), Wusi (五四村), Shuixiakou (水峡口村), Baigudong (白谷洞村), Hongquan (洪泉村), Yanhao (鄢郝村), Siling (四岭村), Hehuayan (荷花堰村), Dingjiabang (丁家塝村), Gaoling (高岭村), Xiongtan (熊滩村), Chenbazi (陈八字村), Dazhu (大竹村), Tianwang (天王村), Bazimen (八字门村), Shengjing (胜境村), Wangjiaguai (汪家拐村), Longquanshan (龙泉山村), Huolong (火龙村), Xiaohuanling (小焕岭村)

==== Yonglong ====
Yonglong (永漋镇) is made up of two communities and thirty villages:

Name	Chinese (S)	Pinyin
Yonglongjie	永漋街社区	Yǒnglóngjiē Shèqū
Yangfengjie	杨浲街社区	Yángféngjiē Shèqū
Tongyi	同益	Tóngyì
Qinglong'an	青龙庵	Qīnglóng'ān
Qingnian	青年	Qīngnián
Zhangjialing	张家岭	Zhāngjiālǐng
Mantianxing	满天星	Mǎntiānxīng
Luxiangtai	卢相台(楼相台)	Lúxiàngtái
Gongyi	公益	Gōngyì
Zhangchangtai	张常台	Zhāngchángtái
Hongqi	红旗	Hóngqí
Jiajiakou	贾家口(贾家台)	Jiǎjiākǒu
Liujiazha	刘家榨	Liújiāzhà
Qunli	群力	Qúnlì
Shibanxiang	石板巷	Shíbǎnxiàng
Zengkou	罾口(曾口)	Zēngkǒu
Taojialing	陶家岭	Táojiālǐng
Majialing	马家岭	Mǎjiālǐng
Shinüshan	石女山	Shínǚshān
Guchengkou	古城口	Gǔchéngkǒu
Yangjiafeng	杨家浲	Yángjiāféng
Yanjiadun	严家墩	Yánjiādūn
Niefan	聂畈	Nièfàn
Gaohujie	高湖街	Gāohújiē
Lijialing	黎家岭(黎家大岭)	Líjiālǐng
Lijiayuan	黎家垸	Líjiāyuàn
Lühua	绿化	Lǜhuà
Shangchenqiao	上陈桥	Shàngchénqiáo
Hongguang	红光	Hóngguāng
Fanjiaxiang	樊家巷	Fánjiāxiàng
Xinhekou	新河口	Xīnhékǒu
Xiachenqiao	下陈桥	Xiàchénqiáo

=== Shayang County ===
Towns:

- Shayang Town (沙洋镇), Wulipu (五里铺镇), Shilipu (十里铺镇), Jishan (纪山镇), Shihuiqiao (拾回桥镇), Hougang (后港镇), Maoli (毛李镇), Guandang (官当镇), Lishi (李市镇), Maliang (马良镇), Gaoyang (高阳镇), Shenji (沈集镇), Zengji (曾集镇)

==== Wulipu ====
Wulipu comprises 21 village-level divisions, including two communities and nineteen villages.

Communities:

- Wuli (五里社区), Caochang (草场社区)

Villages:

- Zhaoji (赵集村), Xuchang (许场村), Shiling (十岭村), Bailing (白岭村), Yandian (严店村), Yangji (杨集村), Hexin (合心村), Zaodian (枣店村), Jintai (金台村), Liuji (刘集村), Xianling (显灵村), Zuozhong (左冢村), Chenchi (陈池村), Lianghe (两河村), Lianhe (联合村), Baihu (白虎村), Huolong (火龙村), Anquan (安全村), Taochang (陶场村)

== Jingzhou ==
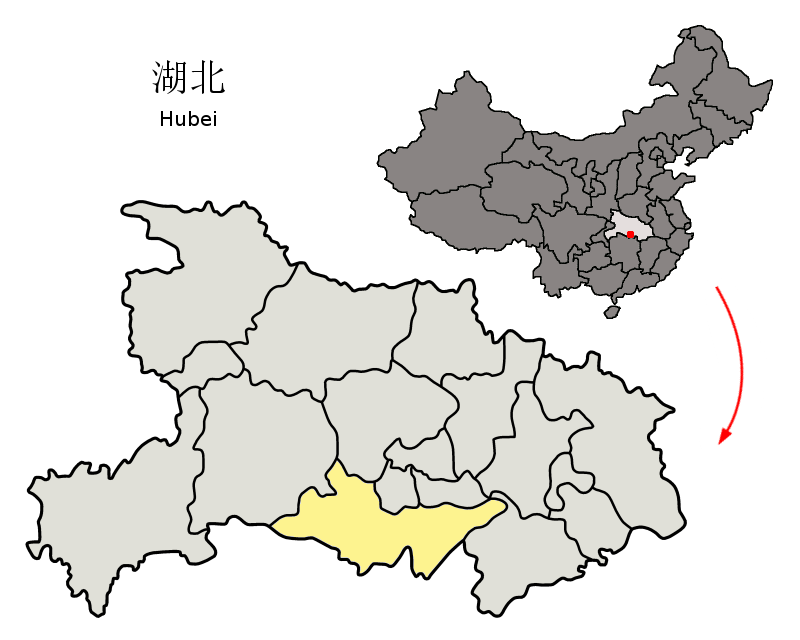
Location of Jingzhou in the province

=== Jingzhou District ===
Subdistricts:

- Xicheng Subdistrict (西城街道), Dongcheng Subdistrict (东城街道), Chengnan Subdistrict (城南街道)

Towns:

- Jinan (纪南镇), Chuandian (川店镇), Mashan (马山镇), Balingshan (八岭山镇), Libu (李埠镇), Mishi (弥市镇), Yingcheng (郢城镇)

=== Shashi District ===
Subdistricts:

- Zhongshan Subdistrict (中山街道), Chongwen Subdistrict (崇文街道), Jiefang Subdistrict (解放街道), Shengli Subdistrict (胜利街道), Chaoyang Subdistrict (朝阳街道), Lianhe Subdistrict (联合街道)

Towns:

- Luochang (锣场镇), Cenhe (岑河镇), Guanyindang (观音垱镇), Guanju (关沮镇)

The only township is Lixin Township (立新乡)

=== Honghu ===
Subdistricts:

- Xindi Subdistrict (新堤街道), Binhu Subdistrict (滨湖街道)

Towns:

- Luoshan (螺山镇), Wulin (乌林镇), Longkou (龙口镇), Yanwo (燕窝镇), Xintan (新滩镇), Fengkou (峰口镇), Caoshi (曹市镇), Fuchang (府场镇), Daijiachang (戴家场镇), Qujiawan (瞿家湾镇), Shakou (沙口镇), Wanquan (万全镇), Chahe (汊河镇), Huangjiakou (黄家口镇)

The only township is Laowan Township (老湾乡)

==== Wanquan ====
One community:

- Wanquan (万全居委会)

Forty-eight villages:

- Xinzhong (新中村), Hongzhong (洪中村), Hongguan (洪关村), Hongchun (洪春村), Hongshan (洪善村), Chenzhuang (陈庄村), Xiaohe (小河村), Tianjing (天景村), Hezui (河咀村), Zheling (柘岭村), Gaohu (高湖村), Lutan (陆坛村), Zhinan (指南村), Donghe (董河村), Wanquan (万全村), Wandian (万电村), Nongke (农科村), Huangsi (黄丝村), Wupeng (吴棚村), Qingming (清明村), Wangmiao (汪庙村), Talu (塔路村), Yongfeng (永丰村), Laogou (老沟村), Jianshi (简市村), Quanfeng (全丰村), Yangzha (杨榨村), Nanchang (南昌村), Dongmiao (东庙村), Shidang (石档村), Hongqiao (红桥村), Zhengdaohu (郑道湖村), Beiling (北岭村), Nanling (南岭村), Xuqiao (徐桥村), Hedian (何电村), Tanzi (潭子村), Huagu (花古村), Bagou (八沟村), C/Zhangsong (长松村), Gongxing (龚兴村), Zhaogou (赵沟村), Zhongling (中岭村), Ma'an (马鞍村), Lifan (里畈村), Zhangdang (张当村), Lu/iuyuan (六垸村), Poling (破岭村)

Two other areas:

- Wanquan (万全渔场), Yongfeng (永丰渔场)

=== Shishou ===
Subdistricts:

- Xiulin Subdistrict (绣林街道), Biheshan Subdistrict (笔架山街道)

Towns:

- Xinchang (新厂镇), Henggoushi (横沟市镇), Dayuan (大垸镇), Xiaohekou (小河口镇), Taohuashan (桃花山镇), Tiaoguan (调关镇), Dongsheng (东升镇), Gaojimiao (高基庙镇), Nankou (南口镇), Gaoling (高陵镇), Tuanshansi (团山寺镇)

The only township is Jiuheyuan Township (久合垸乡)

==== Dongsheng ====
Three communities:

- Huajiadang (滑家垱居委会), Ping'an (平安居委会), Jiaoshanhe (焦山河居委会)

Thirty-three villages:

- Tunzishan (屯子山村), Tongzigang (童子岗村), Fengshan (凤山村), Tuchengyuan (土城垸村), Sanjiayuan (三家垸村), Zhuangjiapu (庄家铺村), Chenjiapu (陈家铺村), Changdisi (长堤寺村), Bijiatang (毕家塘村), Zinandi (梓楠堤村), Xindikou (新堤口村), Wanghai (王海村), Huayuhu (花鱼湖村), Lianghu (两湖村), Huangjiatan (黄家潭村), Yazihu (鸭子湖村), Nanhetou (南河头村), Yuelianghu (月亮湖村), Machuan (马船村), Xianzhongmiao (显忠庙村), Dayangshu (大杨树村), Zoumaling (走马岭村), Guanluqi (关路圻村), Xiemamiao (歇马庙村), Bajiaoling (八角岭村), Jiangjiachong (蒋家冲村), Dongjialou (董家剅村), Yanglin (杨林村), Dongsheng (东升村), Sanheyuan (三合垸村), Yujiapeng (余家棚村), Xingangkou (新港口村), Yayanqiao (鸭堰桥村)

Four other areas:

- Yazihu (鸭子湖渔场), State-run Farm (国营种畜场), Shangjinhu (上津湖渔场), Yanzhi (胭脂湖渔场)

=== Songzi ===
Towns:

- Xinjiangkou (新江口镇), Nanhai (南海镇), Babao (八宝镇), Yuanshi (宛市镇), Laocheng (老城镇), Chendian (陈店镇), Wangjiaqiao (王家桥镇), Sijiachang (斯家场镇), Yanglinshi (杨林市镇), Zhichanghe (纸厂河镇), Jieheshi (街河市镇), Weishui (危水镇), Liujiachang (刘家场镇), Shadaoguan (沙道观镇)

Townships:

- Wanjia Township (万家乡), Xiejiaping Tujia Ethnic Township (卸甲坪土家族乡)

=== Gong'an County ===
Towns:

- Buhe (埠河镇), Douhudi (斗湖堤镇), Jiazhuyuan (夹竹园镇), Zhakou (闸口镇), Yangjiachang (杨家厂镇), Mahaokou (麻豪口镇), Ouchi (藕池镇), Huangshantou (黄山头镇), Mengjiaxi (孟家溪镇), Nanping (南平镇), Zhangzhuangpu (章庄铺镇), Shizikou (狮子口镇), Banzhudang (斑竹垱镇), Maojiagang (毛家港镇)

Townships:

- Ganjiachang Township (甘家厂乡), Zhangtiansi Township (章田寺乡)

=== Jiangling County ===
Towns:

- Zishi (资市镇), Tanqiao (滩桥镇), Xionghe (熊河镇), Baimasi (白马寺镇), Shagang (沙岗镇), Puji (普济镇), Haoxue (郝穴镇)

Townships:

- Majiazhai Township (马家寨乡), Qinshi Township (秦市乡)

=== Jianli County ===
Towns:

- Rongcheng (容城镇), Zhuhe (朱河镇), Xingou (新沟镇), Gongchang (龚场镇), Zhoulaozui (周老嘴镇), Huangxiekou (黄歇口镇), Wangqiao (汪桥镇), Chengji (程集镇), Fenyan (分盐镇), Maoshi (毛市镇), Futiansi (福田寺镇), Shangchewan (上车湾镇), Bianhe (汴河镇), Chiba (尺八镇), Bailuo (白螺镇), Wangshi (网市镇), Sanzhou (三洲镇), Qiaoshi (桥市镇)

Townships:

- Hongcheng Township (红城乡), Qipan Township (棋盘乡), Zhemu Township (柘木乡)

==== Wangshi ====
Two residential communities:

- Wangshi (网市居委会), Beikou (北口居委会)

Twenty-three villages:

- Xiaotan (小潭村), Gaoqiao (高桥村), Batou (扒头村), Sanguan (三官村), Gaomiao (高庙村), Gumiao (顾庙村), Hengdi (横堤村), Jianxin (建新村), Beikou (北口村), Tiemiao (铁庙村), Yushi (予市村), Nianqiao (碾桥村), Wangshi (网市村), Xinlu (新芦村), Zhoutai (周台村), Miaolu (庙芦村), Sansheng (三圣村), Tiezui (铁嘴村), Minglu (明芦村), Datan (大潭村), Liulian (刘连村), Liuwang (刘王村), Xinshan/sha (新杉村)

== Qianjiang ==
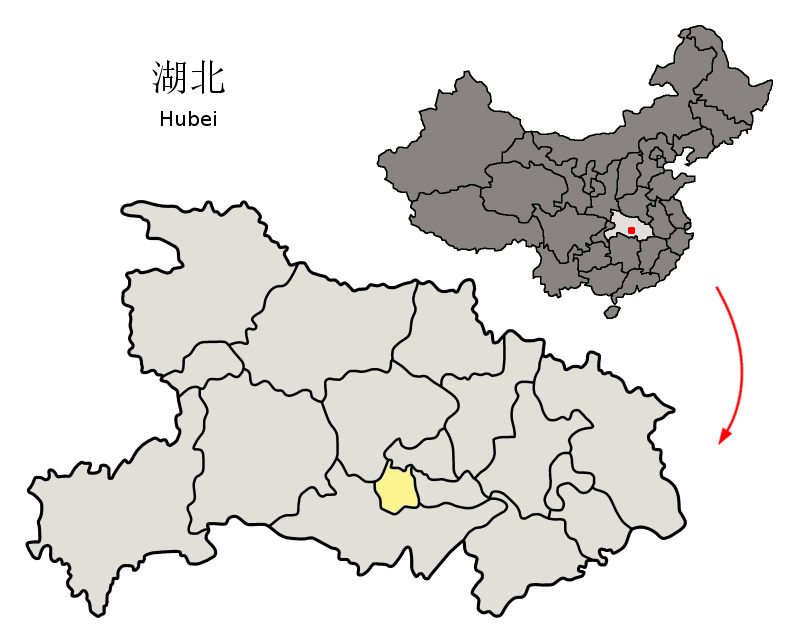
Location of Qianjiang in the province

Six subdistricts:

- Yuanlin Subdistrict (园林街道), Yangshi Subdistrict (杨市街道), Zhouji Subdistrict (周矶街道), Guanghua Subdistrict (广华街道), Taifeng Subdistrict (泰丰街道), Gaochang Subdistrict (高场街道)

Ten towns:

- Zhugentan (竹根滩镇), Yuyang (渔洋镇), Wangchang (王场镇), Gaoshibei (高石碑镇), Xiongkou (熊口镇), Laoxin (老新镇), Haokou (浩口镇), Jiyukou (积玉口镇), Zhangjin (张金镇), Longwan (龙湾镇)

Other areas:

- Qianjiang Development Zone/Zekou Subdistrict (潜江开发区/泽口街道), Bailuhu Administrative Area (白鹭湖管理区), Zongkou Administrative Area (总口管理区), Xiongkou Farm Administrative Area (熊口农场管理区), Yunlianghu Administrative Area (运粮湖管理区), Houhu Administrative Area (后湖管理区), Zhouji Administrative Area (周矶管理区), Jianghan Oil Administrative Area (江汉石油管理局)

== Shennongjia ==
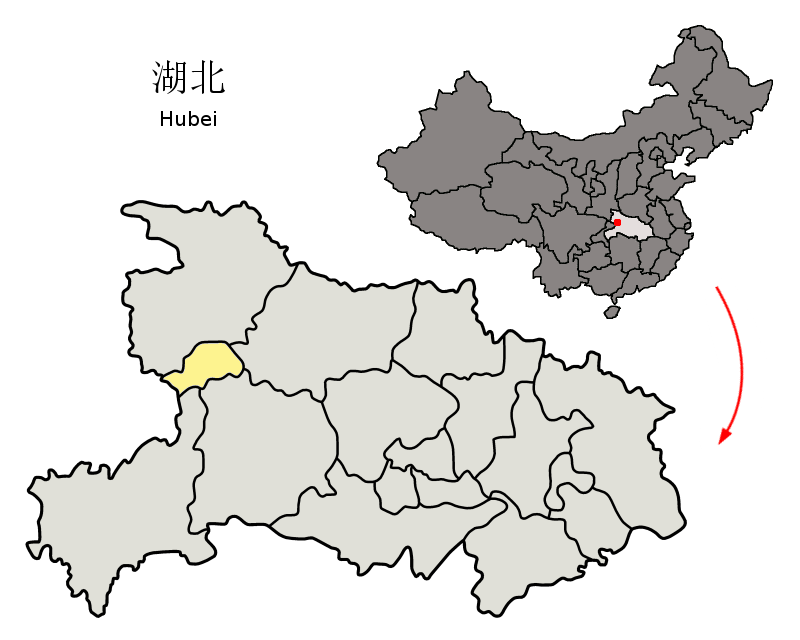
Location of Shennongjia in the province

Towns:

- Songbai (松柏镇), Yangri (阳日镇), Muyu (木鱼镇), Hongping (红坪镇), Xinhua (新华镇)

Townships:

- Songluo Township (宋洛乡), Jiuhu Township (九湖乡), Xiaguping Tujia Ethnic Township (下谷坪土家族乡)

=== Muyu ===
Residential communities:

- Muyuping (木鱼坪社区), Honghuaping (红花坪社区), Xiangxiyuan (香溪源社区)

Villages:

- Honghuaping (红花坪村), Sanduihe (三堆河村), Laojunshan (老君山村), Chaoshuihe (潮水河村), Qingfeng (青峰村), Shennongtan (神农坛村), Muyu (木鱼村), Qingtian (青天村)

==== Xinhua ====
Residential communities:

- Zhangshuping (樟树坪社区)

Villages:

- Longkou (龙口村), Longtan (龙潭村), Gaobaiyan (高白岩村), Taoping (桃坪村), Maluchang (马鹿场村), Daling (大岭村), Mao'erguan (猫儿观村), Shiwotou (石屋头村), Bao'erdong (豹儿洞村)

== Shiyan ==
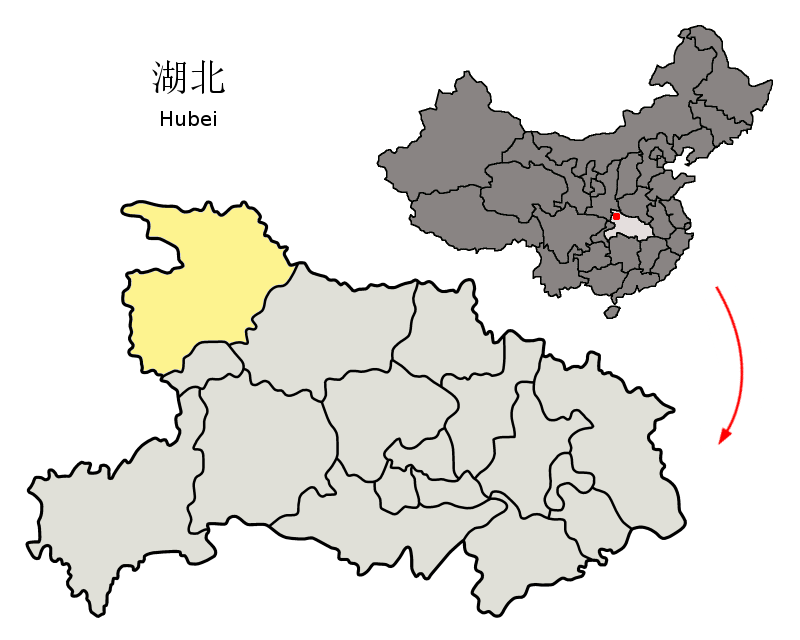
Location of Shiyan in the province

=== Maojian District ===
Subdistricts:

- Wudang Road Subdistrict (武当路街道), Eryan Subdistrict (二堰街道), Wuyan Subdistrict (五堰街道), Bailang Subdistrict (白浪街道)

The only town is Dachuan (大川镇)

Townships:

- Xiaochuan Township (小川乡), Maota Township (茅塔乡), Yuanyang Township (鸳鸯乡)

=== Zhangwan District ===
Subdistricts:

- Huaguo Subdistrict (花果街道), Hongwei Subdistrict (红卫街道), Checheng Road Subdistrict (车城路街道), Hanjiang Road Subdistrict (汉江路街道)

Towns:

- Huanglong (黄龙镇), Bailin (柏林镇)

Townships:

- Fangtan Township (方滩乡), Xigou Township (西沟乡)

=== Danjiangkou ===
Subdistricts:

- Junzhou Road Subdistrict (均州路街道), Daba Road Subdistrict (大坝路街道), Danzhao Road Subdistrict (丹赵路街道), Sanguandian Subdistrict (三官殿街道)

Towns:

- Daguanya (土关垭镇), Langhe (浪河镇), Dingjiaying (丁家营镇), Liuliping (六里坪镇), Yanchihe (盐池河镇), Junxian (均县镇), Xijiadian (习家店镇), Haoping (蒿坪镇), Shigu (石鼓镇), Liangshuihe (凉水河镇), Guanshan (官山镇)

The only township is Tutai Township (土台乡)

=== Fang County ===
Towns:

- Chengguan (城关镇), Jundian (军店镇), Hualongyan (化龙堰镇), Tucheng (土城镇), Damuchang (大木厂镇), Qingfeng (青峰镇), Mengusi (门古寺镇), Baihe (白鹤镇), Yerengu (野人谷镇), Hongta (红塔镇), Yaohuai (窑淮镇)

Townships:

- Yaoping Township (姚坪乡), Langkou Township (榔口乡), Shahe Township (沙河乡), Wanguhe Township (万峪河乡), Shangkan Township (上龛乡), Zhongba Township (中坝乡), Jiudao Township (九道乡), Huilong Township (回龙乡)

==== Huilong Township ====
Villages:

- Shisan (十三村), Hongxing (红星村), Hongwei (红卫村), Ershi(二十村), Hongqi (红旗村), Heizhanggou (黑樟沟村), Guqiaogou (古桥沟村)

=== Yun County ===
Towns:

- Chengguan (城关镇), Anyang (安阳镇), Yangxipu (杨溪铺镇), Qingqu (青曲镇), Baisangguan (白桑关镇), Nanhuatang (南化塘镇), Bailang (白浪镇), Liudong (刘洞镇), Tanshan (谭山镇), Meipu (梅铺镇), Qingshan (青山镇), Liubei (柳陂镇), Baoxia (鲍峡镇), Hujiaying (胡家营镇), Tanjiawan (谭家湾镇)

Townships:

- Daliu Township (大柳乡), Wufeng Township (五峰乡), Yeda Township (叶大乡)

==== Daliu Township ====
Twelve villages:

- Yangjia (杨家村), Shizigou (十字沟村), Jintang (金堂村), Zuoxisi (左溪寺村), Huanglongmiao (黄龙庙村), Songshuwan (松树湾村), Daliushu (大柳树村), Yuliang (余粮村), Huajiahe (华家河村), Gangzigou (杠子沟村), Shuangping (双坪村), Baiquan (白泉村)

=== Yunxi County ===
Towns:

- Chengguan (城关镇), Tumen (土门镇), Shangjin (上津镇), Dianzi (店子镇), Jiahe (夹河镇), Yangwei (羊尾镇), Guanyin (观音镇), Ma'an (马鞍镇), Hejia (河夹镇)

Townships:

- Xiangkou Township (香口乡), Guanfang Township (关防乡), Hubeikou Hui Ethnic Township (湖北口回族乡), Jingyang Township (景阳乡), Liulang Township (六郎乡), Jianchi Township (涧池乡), Anjia Township (安家乡), Huaishulin Township (槐树林乡), Sanguandong Township (三官洞乡)

=== Zhushan County ===
Towns:

- Chengguan (城关镇), Yishui (溢水镇), Majiadu (麻家渡镇), Baofeng (宝丰镇), Leigu (擂鼓镇), Qingu (秦古镇), Desheng (得胜镇), Tianjia (田家镇), Guandu (官渡镇)

Townships:

- Pankou Township (潘口乡), Zhuping Township (竹坪乡), Damiao Township (大庙乡), Shuangtai Township (双台乡), Loutai Township (楼台乡), Wenfeng Township (文峰乡), Shenhe Township (深河乡), Liulin Township (柳林乡), Duheyuan Township (堵河源乡)

=== Zhuxi County ===
Towns:

- Chengguan (城关镇), Jiangjiayan (蒋家堰镇), Zhongfeng (中峰镇), Shuiping (水坪镇), Xianhe (县河镇), Quanxi (泉溪镇), Fengxi, Zhuxi (丰溪镇), Longba (龙坝镇)

Townships:

- Xinzhou Township (新洲乡), Bingying Township (兵营乡), Eping Township (鄂坪乡), Huiwan Township (汇湾乡), Tianbao Township (天宝乡), Taoyuan Township (桃源乡), Xiangba Township (向坝乡)

== Suizhou ==
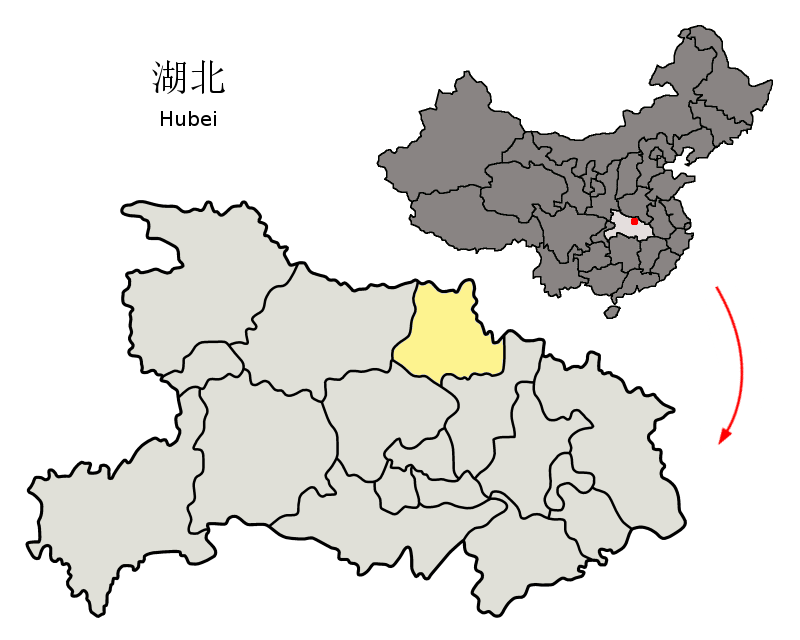
Location of Suizhou in the province

=== Zengdu District ===
Subdistricts:

- Xicheng Subdistrict (西城街道), Dongcheng Subdistrict (东城街道), Nanjiao Subdistrict (南郊街道), Beijiao Subdistrict (北郊街道), Chengnan New Area Subdistrict (城南新区街道)

Towns:

- Wandian (万店镇), Hedian (何店镇), Luoyang (洛阳镇), Fuhe (府河镇), Xihe (淅河镇)

=== Guangshui ===
Subdistricts:

- Yingshan Subdistrict (应山街道), Shili Subdistrict (十里街道), Guangshui Subdistrict (广水街道)

Towns:

- Wushengguan (武胜关镇), Yangzhai (杨寨镇), Chenxiang (陈巷镇), Changling (长岭镇), Maping (马坪镇), Guanmiao (关庙镇), Yudian (余店镇), Wudian (吴店镇), Haodian (郝店镇), Caihe (蔡河镇)

Townshisp:

- Chengjiao Township (城郊乡), Lidian Township (李店乡), Taiping Township (太平乡), Luodian Township (骆店乡)

==== Wudian ====
One community:

- Dongmenlou (东门楼社区)

Fourteen villages:

- Shuangxiang (双乡村), Quankou (泉口村), Louziwan (楼子湾村), Shuanggang (双岗村), Donghe (东河村), Wangzidian (王子店村), Zhongxin (中心村), Dongwan (东湾村), Yangjia'ao (杨家坳村), Zhimawan (芝麻湾村), Jiangxidian (浆溪店村), Santumen (三土门村), Tangfan (塘畈村), Xujiashan (徐家山村)

=== Sui County ===
Towns:

- Lishan (厉山镇), Gaocheng (高城镇), Yindian (殷店镇), Caodian (草店镇), Xiaolin (小林镇), Huaihe (淮河镇), Wanhe (万和镇), Shangshi (尚市镇), Tangxian (唐县镇), Wushan (吴山镇), Xinjie (新街镇), Anju (安居镇), Huantan (环潭镇), Hongshan (洪山镇), Changgang (长岗镇), Sanligang (三里岗镇), Liulin (柳林镇), Junchuan (均川镇), Wanfudian (万福店镇)

==== Gaocheng ====
One community:

- Gaocheng (高城居委会)

Thirteen villages:

- Daqiao (大桥村), Longwangmiao (龙王庙村), Meizigou (梅子沟村), Leijiaci (雷家祠村), Qilita (七里塔村), Xinwu (新屋村), Sanqingguan (三清观村), Luojiaqiao (罗家桥村), Qianjin (前进村), Xiejiadian (卸甲店村), Qigudian (七姑店村), Songduo (嵩垛村), Gaohuang (高黄村)

== Tianmen ==
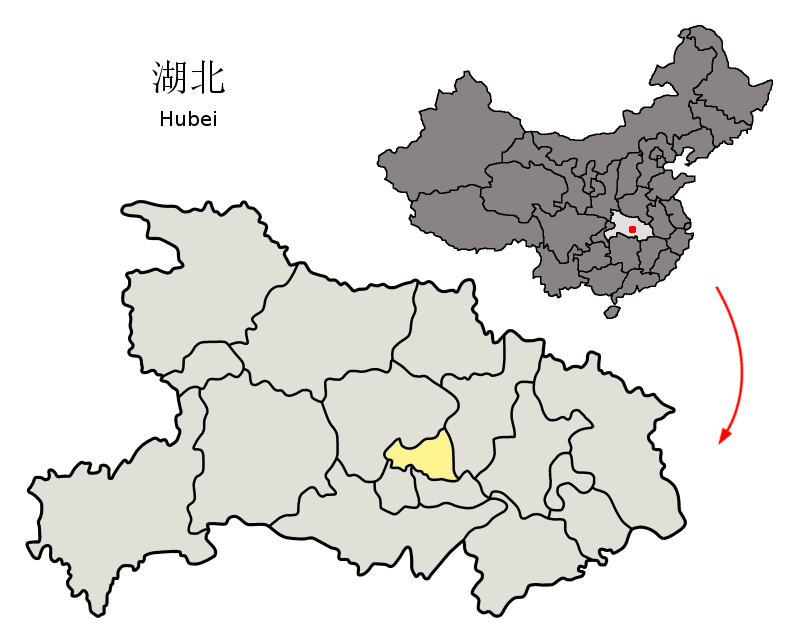
Location of Tianmen in the province

Subdistricts:

- Jingling Subdistrict (竟陵街道), Qiaoxiang Subdistrict Development Zone (侨乡街道开发区), Yanglin Subdistrict (杨林街道)

Towns:

- Duobao (多宝镇), Tuoshi (拖市镇), Zhanggang (张港镇), Jiangchang (蒋场镇), Wangchang (汪场镇), Yuxin (渔薪镇), Huangtan (黄潭镇), Yuekou (岳口镇), Henglin (横林镇), Pengshi (彭市镇), Mayang (麻洋镇), Duoxiang (多祥镇), Ganyi (干驿镇), Mawan (马湾镇), Lushi (卢市镇), Xiaoban (小板镇), Jiuzhen (九真镇), Zaoshi (皂市镇), Hushi (胡市镇), Shijiahe (石家河镇), Fozishan (佛子山镇)

The only township is Jingtan Township (净潭乡)

Other Areas:

- Tianmen Industrial Park (天门工业园), Jianghu Farm (蒋湖农场), Baimaohu Farm (白茅湖农场), Chenhu Committee (沉湖管委会)

=== Mawan ===
One community:

- Mawan (马湾居委会)

Twenty-five villages:

- Machang (马场村), Chenma (陈马村), Luwan (卢湾村), Zouwan (邹湾村), Zhengwan (郑湾村), Bianhekou (便河口村), Litan (李滩村), Yangang (鄢港村), Zhawu (榨屋村), Hengdi (横堤村), Nanzha (南闸村), Zhangwan (张湾村), Chenhuang (陈黄村), Liaowan (廖湾村), Jianghu (蒋湖村), Zengliu (曾刘村), Guozui (郭咀村), Datai (大台村), Wangchen (汪陈村), Hedi (河堤村), Xiaohu (小湖村), Kuangtai (匡台村), Tukeng (土坑村), Chendu (陈渡村), Chengang (陈港村)

== Xiangyang ==
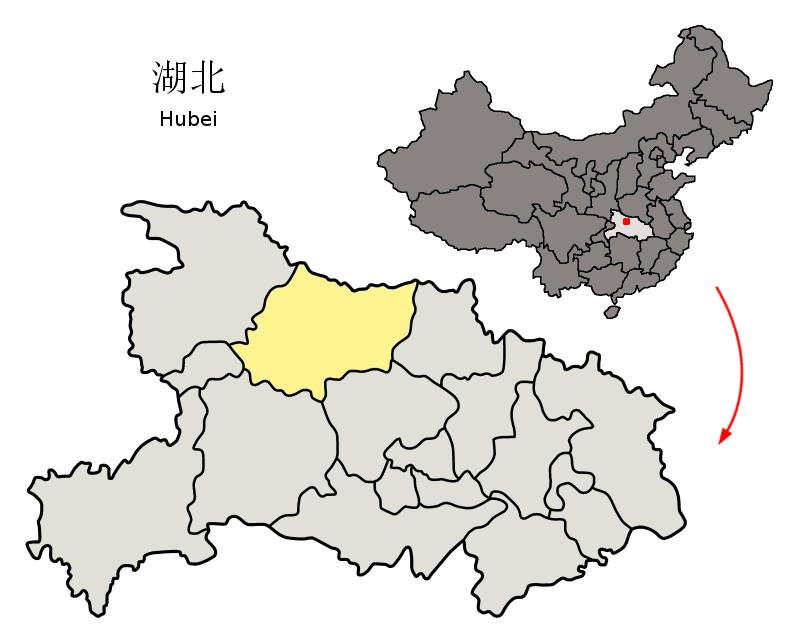
Location of Xiangyang in the province

=== Fancheng District ===
Subdistricts:

- Hanjiang Subdistrict (汉江街道), Wangzhai Subdistrict (王寨街道), Zhongyuan Subdistrict (中原街道), Dingzhongmen Subdistrict (定中门街道), Qinghekou Subdistrict (清河口街道), Pingxiangmen Subdistrict (屏襄门街道), Migong Subdistrict (米公街道), Shipu Subdistrict (柿铺街道), Zizhen Subdistrict (紫贞街道), Qilihe Subdistrict (七里河街道), Dongfeng Subdistrict (东风街道)

Towns:

- Niushou (牛首镇), Taipingdian (太平店镇), Tuanshan (团山镇), Mizhuang (米庄镇)

=== Xiangcheng District ===
Subdistricts:

- Wangfu Subdistrict (王府街道), Zhaoming Subdistrict (昭明街道), Panggong Subdistrict (庞公街道), Tanxi Subdistrict (檀溪街道), Longzhong Subdistrict (隆中街道), Yujiahu Subdistrict (余家湖街道)

Towns:

- Oumiao (欧庙镇), Wolong (卧龙镇)

The only township is Yinji Township (尹集乡)

=== Xiangzhou District ===
Subdistricts:

- Zhangwan Subdistrict (张湾街道), Liuji Subdistrict (刘集街道)

Towns:

- Longwang (龙王镇), Shiqiao (石桥镇), Huangji (黄集镇), Huopai (伙牌镇), Guyi (古驿镇), Zhuji (朱集镇), Chenghe (程河镇), Shuanggou (双沟镇), Zhangjiaji (张家集镇), Huanglong (黄龙镇), Yushan (峪山镇), Dongjin (东津镇)

==== Dongjin ====
Villages:

- Shangying (上营村), Qixiang (祁巷村), Dongjin (东津村), Fanying (樊营村), Fanpo (樊坡村), Chenpo (陈坡村), Yishe (一社村), Ershe (二社村), Shangzhou (上洲村), Zhongzhou (中洲村), Xiazhou (下洲村), Wangzhai (王寨村), Sanhe (三合村), Liwan (李湾村), Qiangang (前岗村), Hougang (后岗村), Weili (魏李村), Zhuangchong (庄冲村), Chunhe (淳河村), Tangchong (唐冲村), Qinzui (秦咀村), Tianchong (田冲村), Pengzhuang (彭庄村), Yanpo (堰坡村), Zhouzhai (周寨村), Zhupeng (朱彭村), Tanwan (覃湾村), Cuihu (崔胡村), Xiaogang (肖岗村), Yuegang (岳岗村), Tangdian (唐店村), Sunwangying (孙王营村), Liudian (刘店村), Houying (侯营村), Shenying (沈营村), Zhonglou (中楼村), Yingkou (营口村), Fuzhai (付寨村), Wuwan (吴湾村), Heli (合力村), Lüzhai (吕寨村), Xiaoying (肖营村), Tangzhuang (唐庄村), Yuedi (岳底村), Magang (马岗村), Liugou (柳沟村), Zhengwan (郑湾村), Dahuo (打伙村), Qili (七里村), Zhangzui (张咀村), Zhuying (朱营村), Jianpo (简坡村)

=== Laohekou ===
Subdistricts:

- Guanghua Subdistrict (光化街道), Zanyang Subdistrict (酂阳街道)

Towns:

- Menglou (孟楼镇), Zhulinqiao (竹林桥镇), Xueji (薛集镇), Zhangji (张集镇), Xianrendu (仙人渡镇), Hongshanzui (洪山嘴镇), Lilou (李楼镇)

The only township is Yuanchong Township (袁冲乡)

=== Yicheng ===
Subdistricts:

- Yancheng Subdistrict (鄢城街道), Nanying Subdistrict (南营街道)

Towns:

- Zhengji (郑集镇), Xiaohe (小河镇), Liuhou (刘猴镇), Kongwan (孔湾镇), Liushui (流水镇), Banqiao (板桥镇), Wangji (王集镇), Leihe (雷河镇)

=== Zaoyang ===
Subdistricts:

- Beicheng Subdistrict (北城街道), Nancheng Subdistrict (南城街道), Huancheng Subdistrict (环城街道)

Towns:

- Juwan (琚湾镇), Qifang (七方镇), Yangdang (杨当镇), Taiping (太平镇), Xinshi (新市镇), Lutou (鹿头镇), Liusheng (刘升镇), Xinglong (兴隆镇), Wangcheng (王城镇), Wudian (吴店镇), Xiongji (熊集镇), Pinglin (平林镇)

==== Xinshi ====
Communities:

- Xinshi (新市居委会), Qiangang (钱岗居委会)

Villages:

- Xinyi (新一村), Qianjing (前井村), Lilou (李楼村), Hongyanhe (鸿雁河村), Dayan (大堰村), Luolou (骆楼村), Dongliwan (东李湾村), Xiepeng (谢棚村), Zhaozhuang (赵庄村), Zhangxiang (张巷村), Xiaozhuang (肖庄村), Luohebei (洛河北村), Huangwan (黄湾村), Pengzhuang (彭庄村), Huoqing (火青村), Xingchuan (邢川村), Zhoulou (周楼村), Qianwan (前湾村), Zhengjiawan (郑家湾村), Fujiawan (付家湾村), Mengziping (孟子坪村), Tanghe (汤河村), Xinji (新集村), Luozhuang (骆庄村), Qiangangyi (钱岗一村), Qiangang'er (钱岗二村), Wanglaozhuang (王老庄村), Qiandang (钱当村), Xionggang (熊岗村), Wangdaqiao (王大桥村), Xiliwang (西李湾村), Gaoya (高庄村), Shantouli (山头里村), Dengpeng (邓棚村), Yaopeng (姚棚村), Bailu (白露村), Yangzhuang (杨庄村), Rengang (任岗村), Quangou (泉沟村)

==== Wudian ====
Communities:

- Zhongxin (中心社区), Qingtan (清潭社区)

Villages:

- Xinzhuang (新庄村), Chunling (春陵村), Yaogang (姚岗村), Xizhaohu (西赵湖村), Shengmiao (圣庙村), Erlang (二郎村), Xiaowan (肖湾村), Zhouzhai (周寨村), Huangmiao (黄庙村), Dongzhaohu (东赵湖村), Shutou (树头村), Gunhe (滚河村), Lizhai (李寨村), Tongxin (同心村), Huangcun (皇村村), Shilou (施楼村), Wukou (五口村), Shenfan (沈畈村), Baima (白马村), Gaofeng (高峰村), Dazi (达子村), Xulou (徐楼村), Baishui (白水村), Tiantai (田台村), Liangshui (凉水村), Tangwan (唐湾村), Chaijiamiao (柴家庙村), Dongchong (东冲村), Jiangfan (蒋畈村), Yuzui (喻咀村), Shuangcaomen (双槽门村), Sanligang (三里岗村), Xuzhai (徐寨村), Chengwan (程湾村), Shuangwan (双湾村), Jingwan (井湾村), Qiganwan (旗杆湾村), Changligang (长里岗村), Dayanjiao (大堰角村), Yuhuangmiao (玉皇庙村), Hewan (何湾村), Huawuji (花屋脊村), Shici (史祠村), Yufan (余畈村)

=== Baokang County ===
Towns:

- Chengguan (城关镇), Huangbao (黄堡镇), Houping (后坪镇), Longping (龙坪镇), Dianya (店垭镇), Maliang (马良镇), Xiema (歇马镇), Maqiao (马桥镇), Siping (寺坪镇), Guoduwan (过渡湾镇)

The only township is Lianggu Township (两峪乡)

=== Gucheng County ===
Towns:

- Chengguan (城关镇), Shihua (石花镇), Shengkang (盛康镇), Miaotan (庙滩镇), Wushan (五山镇), Cihe (茨河镇), Nanhe (南河镇), Zijin (紫金镇), Lengji (冷集镇)

The only township is Zhaowan Township (赵湾乡)

==== Shihua ====
Eight residential communities:

- Dongmenjie (东门街社区), Xihejie (西河街社区), Shixijie (石溪街社区), Cangtaijie (苍苔街社区), Houfan (后畈社区), Minyingjingjiqu (民营经济区社区), Dayuqiaojie (大峪桥街社区), Laojuntai (老君台社区)

Thirty-eight villages:

- Jiepaiya (界牌垭村), Hongmamiao (红马庙村), Tiemiaogou (铁庙沟村), Huangjiaying (黄家营村), Pingchuan (平川村), Peijiaqiao (裴家桥村), Gongjiawan (巩家湾村), Yangxiwan (杨溪湾村), Shuixingtai (水星台村), Xiaxindian (下新店村), Zhoujiawan (周家湾村), Shijiawan (施家湾村), Pengjiawan (彭家湾村), Caijiaying (蔡家营村), Gaojiachong (高家冲村), Dayu (大峪村), Shaojialou (邵家楼村), Doupodian (陡坡店村), Biaojiamiao (彪家庙村), Tuqiaogou (土桥沟村), Tongbeimiao (同北庙村), Yinfan (殷畈村), Liangshuijing (凉水井村), Pengjialing (彭家岭村), Xijiaya (席家垭村), Wujiazhou (五家洲村), Yanwan (岩湾村), Cangyu (苍峪村), Baijiayan (白家堰村), Tongshan (铜山村), Cuihuapu (翠花铺村), Jiangjunshan (将军山村), Yangjiahu (杨家湖村), Xiaotanshan (小坦山村), Chenjialou (陈家楼村), Longjiagou (龙家沟村), Longwan (龙湾村)

=== Nanzhang County ===
Towns:

- Chengguan (城关镇), Wu'an (武安镇), Jiuji (九集镇), Limiao (李庙镇), Changping (长坪镇), Xueping (薛坪镇), Banqiao (板桥镇), Xunjian (巡检镇), Donggong (东巩镇), Xiaoyan (肖堰镇)

== Xianning ==
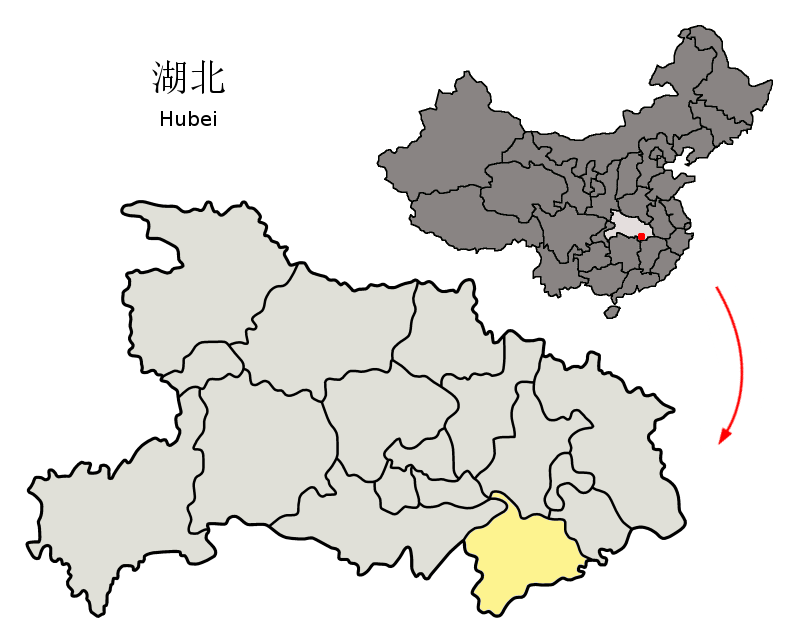
Location of Xianning in the province

=== Xian'an District ===
Subdistricts:

- Wenquan Subdistrict (温泉街道), Fushan Subdistrict (浮山街道), Yong'an Subdistrict (永安街道)

Towns:

- Tingsiqiao (汀泗桥镇), Xiangyanghu (向阳湖镇), Guanbuqiao (官埠桥镇), Henggouqiao (横沟桥镇), Heshengqiao (贺胜桥镇), Shuangxiqiao (双溪桥镇), Maqiao (马桥镇), Guihua (桂花镇), Gaoqiao (高桥镇)

The only township is Damu Township (大幕乡)

=== Chibi City ===
Subdistricts:

- Puqi Subdistrict (蒲圻街道), Chimagang Subdistrict (赤马港街道), Lushuihu Subdistrict (陆水湖街道)

Towns:

- Xindian (新店镇), Zhaoliqiao (赵李桥镇), Cha'anling (茶庵岭镇), Chebu (车埠镇), Chibi Town (赤壁镇), Liushanhu (柳山湖镇), Shenshan (神山镇), Zhonghuopu (中伙铺镇), Guantangyi (官塘驿镇), Huangshanhu (黄盖湖镇)

The only township is Yujiaqiao Township (余家桥乡)

=== Chongyang County ===
Towns:

- Tiancheng (天城镇), Shaping (沙坪镇), Shicheng (石城镇), Guihuaquan (桂花泉镇), Baini (白霓镇), Lukou (路口镇), Jintang (金塘镇), Qingshan (青山镇)

Townships:

- Xiaoling Township (肖岭乡), Tongzhong Township (铜钟乡), Gangkou Township (港口乡), Gaojian Township (高枧乡)

==== Xiaoling ====
Ten villages:

- 金不村, 泉陂村, 台山村, 大堰村, 霞星村, 肖岭村, 白马村, 三角村, 星桥村, 锁石村

=== Jiayu County ===
Towns:

- Luxi (陆溪镇), Gaotieling (高铁岭镇), Guanqiao (官桥镇), Yuyue (鱼岳镇), Xinjie (新街镇), Dupu (渡普镇), Panjiawan (潘家湾镇), Paizhouwan (牌洲湾镇)

=== Tongcheng County ===
Towns:

- Junshui (隽水镇), Maishi (麦市镇), Tanghu (塘湖镇), Guandao (关刀镇), Shadui (沙堆镇), Wuli (五里镇), Shinan (石南镇), Beigang (北港镇), Magang (马港镇)

Townships:

- Sizhuang Township (四庄乡), Daping Township (大坪乡)

==== Juanshui ====
Eight communities:

- Yanta 雁塔, Yincheng 银城, Xinta 新塔, Xuhong 旭红, Xianghan 湘汉, Heping 和平, Xiushui 秀水, Baisha 白沙

Eleven villages:

- Baota 宝塔, Donggang 东港, Taoyuan 桃源, Gulong 古龙, Liuluan 柳峦, Shiquan 石泉, Tiezhu 铁柱, Youfang 油坊, Lihe 利和, Shangkuo 上阔, Xiakuo下阔

=== Tongshan County ===
Towns:

- Tongyang (通羊镇), Nanlinqiao (南林桥镇), Huangshapu (黄沙铺镇), Xiapu (厦铺镇), Jiugongshan (九宫山镇), Chuangwang (闯王镇), Honggang (洪港镇), Dafan (大畈镇)

Townships:

- Dalu Township (大路乡), Yangfanglin Township (杨芳林乡), Yanxia Township (燕厦乡), Cikou Township (慈口乡)

==== Nanlinqiao ====
Communities & villages: 南林桥, 大坪, 石垅, 青垱, 石门, 湄溪, 罗城, 湄港, 雨山, 南林, 港路, 高桥, 团墩12个行政村和1个街道社区.

== Xiantao ==
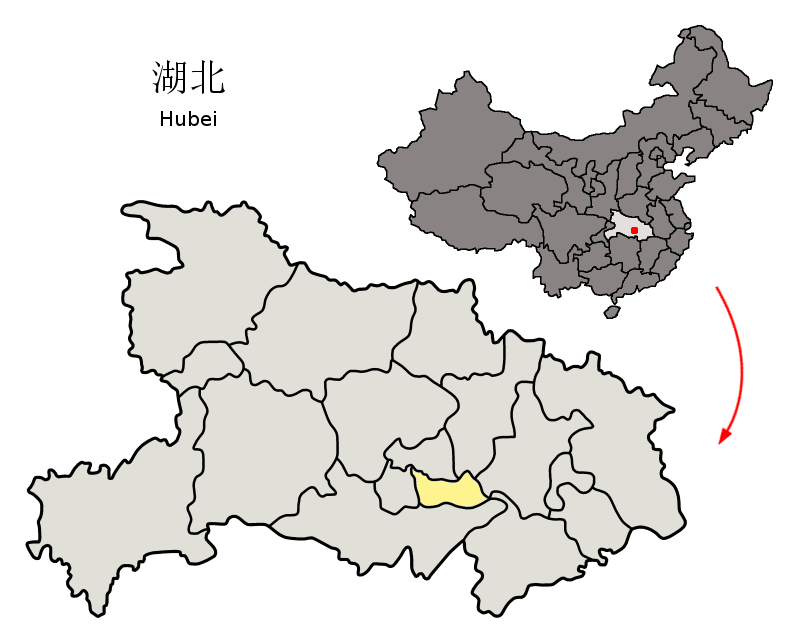
Location of Xiantao in the province

Subdistricts:

- Shazui Subdistrict (沙嘴街道), Ganhe Subdistrict (干河街道), Longhuashan Subdistrict (龙华山街道)

Towns:

- Zhengchang (郑场镇), Maozui (毛嘴镇), Louhe (剅河镇), Sanfutan (三伏潭镇), Huchang (胡场镇), Changtangkou (长埫口镇), Xiliuhe (西流河镇), Shahu (沙湖镇), Yanglinwei (杨林尾镇), Pengchang (彭场镇), Zhanggou (张沟镇), Guohe (郭河镇), Miancheng Hui Town (沔城回族镇), Tonghaikou (通海口镇), Chenchang (陈场镇)

Other Areas:

- Xiantao Industrial Park (仙桃工业园区), Jiuheyuan (九合垸原种场), Shahu (沙湖原种场), Paihu Paihu Scenic Area (排湖风景区), Wuhu Fishery (五湖渔场), Zhaoxiyuan Forestry Area (赵西垸林场), Liujiayuan Forestry Area (刘家垸林场), Chuqinliang Seed Stock Station (畜禽良种场)

== Xiaogan ==
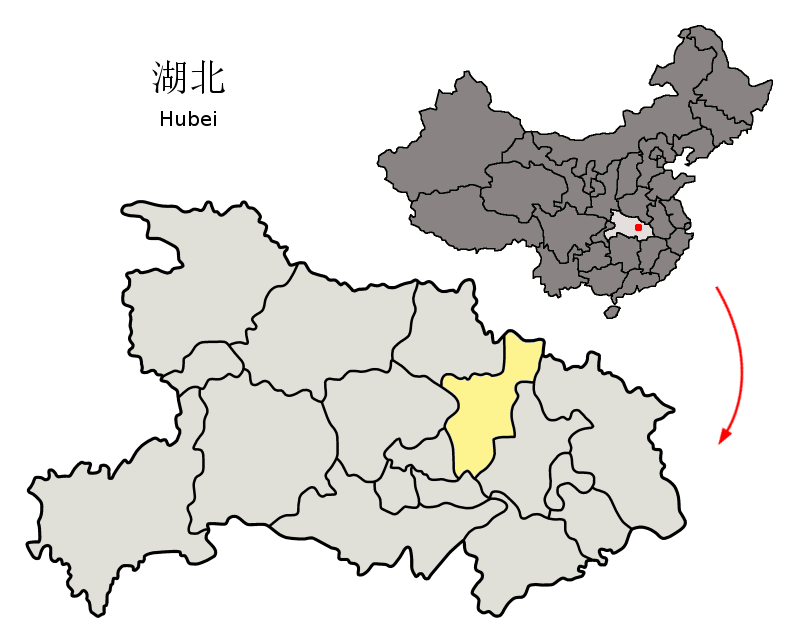
Location of Xiaogan in the province

=== Xiaonan District ===
Four subdistricts:

- Shuyuan Subdistrict (书院街道), Xinhua Subdistrict (新华街道), Guangchang Subdistrict (广场街道), Chezhan Subdistrict (车站街道)

Eight towns:

- Xinpu (新铺镇), Xihe (西河镇), Yangdian (杨店镇), Dougang (陡岗镇), Xiaogang (肖港镇), Maochen (毛陈镇), Sancha (三汊镇), Zhuzhan (祝站镇)

Three townships:

- Pengxing Township (朋兴乡), Wolong Township (卧龙乡), Minji Township (闵集乡)

Six other areas:

- Xiaonan Economic Development Area (孝南区经济开发区), Zhuhu Farm (朱湖农场), Dongshantou Seed Stock Farm (东山头原种场), Danyang Management Office (孝感开发区丹阳办事处), Xiaotian Management Office (孝感开发区孝天办事处), Huaiyin Management Office (孝感开发区槐荫办事处)

==== Shuyuan Subdistrict ====
Communities:

- Shuyuan (书院社区), Beiwai (北外社区), Beichi (北池社区), Xihuqiao (西湖桥社区), Xiangyang (向阳社区), Chengxi (城西社区), Houhu (后湖社区), Wangyao (汪窑社区), Jinxiu (锦绣社区), Yongxin (永新社区)

Villages:

- Guangming (光明村), Jimiao (季庙村)

==== Xinhua Subdistrict ====
Communities:

- Fuqian (府前社区), Zhongshan (中山社区), Meiningguan (梅宁关), Yanhe (沿河社区), Yuji (宇济社区), Wenchangge (文昌阁社区), Wanfu (万福社区), Nanqiao (南桥社区), Shagou (沙沟社区), Liancheng (联城社区), Dukou (渡口社区), Sugala (苏旮旯社区)

==== Chezhan Subdistrict (Xiaonan) ====
Communities:

- Chezhan (车站社区), Liming (黎明社区), Zhengge (郑阁社区), Minzhu (民主社区) Shengli (胜利社区), Hongcheng (鸿城社区)

=== Anlu ===
Subdistricts:

- Fucheng Subdistrict (府城街道), Nancheng Subdistrict (南城街道)

Towns:

- Zhaopeng (赵棚镇), Lidian (李店镇), Xundian (巡店镇), Tangdi (棠棣镇), Leigong (雷公镇), Wangyizhen (王义贞镇), Yandian (烟店镇), Bofan (孛畈镇), Fushui (伏水镇)

Townships:

- Chendian Township (陈店乡), Xinzha Township (辛榨乡), Muzi Township (木梓乡), Jieguan Township (接官乡)

==== Yandian ====
Four communities:

- Yuanfan (袁畈社区), Yuzhai (余寨社区), Songlong (宋垅社区), and Baidian (白店社区)

Thirty-six villages:

- Yandian (烟店村), Bishan (碧山村), Zhouqiao (周桥村), Shuizhai (水寨村), Shuangling (双岭村), Baishu (柏树村), Chalu (岔路村), Ligang (李岗村 Jianshan (尖山村), Feigang (费岗村), Xiaowan (肖湾村), Changgang (长岗村), Zhouci (周祠村), Huangpeng (黄棚村), Guanyan (关堰村), Zhanggang (张岗村), Zhouchong (周冲村), Liwan (李湾村), Tianwan (田湾村), Chengxiang (程巷村), Gonggang (龚岗村), Wanqiao (万桥村), Wanggang (王岗村), Shuangmiao (双庙村), Denghe (邓河村), Denggang (邓岗村), Huanglu (横路村), Dongqiao (董桥村), Shihe (石河村), Zhuluo (竹罗村), Fengmiao (冯庙村), Yaozha (姚榨村), Huangzha (黄榨村), Dengchong (邓冲村), Balicun (八里村), and Pengqiao (彭桥村)

==== Bofan ====
The town is made up of 3 subdistricts and 14 villages including Bofan Community (孛畈社区).

=== Hanchuan ===
The only subdistrict is Xiannüshan Subdistrict (仙女山街道)

Towns:

- Makou (马口镇), Maiwang (脉旺镇), Chenghuang (城隍镇), Fenshui (分水镇), Chenhu (沉湖镇), Tian'erhe (田二河镇), Huilong (回龙镇), Xinyan (新堰镇), Tongzhong (垌塚镇), Mahe (麻河镇), Liujiage (刘家隔镇), Xinhe (新河镇), Miaotou (庙头镇), Yanglingou (杨林沟镇)

Townships:

- Xijiang Township (西江乡), Wantan Township (湾潭乡), Nanhe Township (南河乡), Ma'an Township (马鞍乡), Litan Township (里潭乡), Hanji Township (韩集乡)

==== Xiannüshan ====
17 Communities:

- Xiannüshan 仙女山社区, Zoumaling 走马岭社区, Huanlejie 欢乐街社区, Xianrenwei 仙人位社区, Xihulu 西湖路社区, Bengzhanhe 泵站河社区, Guanbeitang 官备塘社区, Xiangjiayuan 向家垸社区, Huohoushan 火猴山社区, Shanhouwan 山后湾社区, Ximenqiao 西门桥社区, Luheyuan 六合垸社区, Guangchanglu 广场路社区, Huochengtai 霍城台社区, Xianghehuayuan 祥和花园社区, Beiqiao 北桥社区, Fuxing 福星社区

6 Villages:

- Qili 七里村, Guoguang 国光村, Huayi 华一村, Hua'er 华二村, Gangdi 港堤村, Liujiatai 刘家台村

==== Huilong ====
One community:

- Huilong Community (回龙居委会)

Nineteen villages:

- Yangzhan (杨占村), Sanyuan (三元村), Lutai (鲁台村), Dumiao (杜庙村), Chikou (池口村), Chapeng (茶棚村), Xinqiao (新桥村), Huilong (回龙村), Jinjiahui (金家会村), Tangwan (汤湾村), Wangyuan (王垸村), Yuhuangge (玉皇阁村), Guihuashu (桂花树村), Junyuan (均垸村), Wangyang (汪阳村), Machengtai (马城台村), Luosi (螺蛳村), Zaogang (皂港村), Chenyuan (陈园村)

=== Yingcheng ===
Subdistricts:

- Chengzhong Subdistrict (城中街道), Chengbei Subdistrict (城北街道), Silipeng Subdistrict (四里棚街道), Dongmafang Subdistrict (东马坊街道), Changjiangbu Subdistrict (长江埠街道)

Towns:

- Tiandian (田店镇), Yanghe (杨河镇), Sanhe (三合镇), Langjun (郎君镇), Huangtan (黄滩镇), Tian'e (天鹅镇), Yihe (义和镇), Chenhe (陈河镇), Yangling (杨岭镇), Tangchi (汤池镇)

==== Chengzhong ====
Twelve communities:

- Yueyuan (月园社区), Wangjiatai (汪家台社区), Sanyanjing (三眼井社区), Guchengtai (古城台社区), Nianwu (碾屋社区), Guangming (光明社区), Gucheng (古城社区), Gongnonglu (工农路社区), Xinhe (新河社区), Changhu (长湖社区), Xingxing (星星社区), Chuntianmingyuan (春天名苑社区)

Four villages:

- Fanhe (范河村), Baofeng (保丰村), Guoguang (国光村), Zhouchen (周陈村)

==== Chengbei ====
Communities:

- Qixingqiao (七星桥社区), Gaodujie (膏都街社区), Xinjianjie (新建街社区), Zhaofan (赵畈社区)

Villages:

- Changyan (长堰村), Jiangxiang (姜巷村), Beishi (北十村), Wanqiao (万桥村), Yangfan (杨畈村), C/Shengtan (盛滩村), Wulou (吴楼村), Gaoqiao (高桥村), Sunyan (孙堰村), Fugang (付岗村), Hanwan (韩湾村), Douhe (陡河村), Zouguo (邹郭村), Liulin (柳林村), Weihe (魏河村), Xiaoliao (肖廖村), Niepo (聂坡村), Songpo (宋坡村), Lizui (李咀村), Leishan (雷山村), Wangmiao (王庙村), Rehuo (热火村), Gonghe (龚河村), Daihe (戴河村), Xuhuang (徐黄村), Baima (白马村), Baiyang (白杨社区村), Jidun (季墩社区村), Hongtang (红堂村), Xishi (西十村), Chapeng (茶棚村), Xingguang (星光村)

==== Silipeng ====
Three communities:

- Pudong (蒲东社区居委会), Yankuang (盐矿社区居委会), Liuyang (刘杨社区居委会)

Thirteen villages:

- Datian (大田村委会), Zhangyang (张杨社区村民委员会), Xiaxin (下新村委会), Xiehe (协合村委会), Siyang (四杨村委会), Fuxing (复兴村委会), Huashan (华山村委会), Dongshi (东十村委会), Aimiao (艾庙村委会), Lishu (栗树村委会), Sunxiong (孙熊村委会), Guanghui (光辉村委会), Sanjiang (三姜村委会)

==== Sanhe ====
Villages:

- Sanhe (三合村), Huali (华李村), Lutai (鲁台村), Gaolu (高卢村), Tianjing (天井村), Tumen (土门村), Duimian (对面村), Shuangdun (双墩村), Yihe (宜和村), Caoyang (曹杨村), Bapeng (八彭村), Yaogeng (么井村), Sanjie (三结村), Yuechi (月池村), Liufen (六份村), Lizhai (李榨村), Weida (魏大村), Xitou (西头村), Chenyuan (陈垸村), Liuhu (刘胡村), Maochong (毛冲村), Xuzhou (徐周村), Xuliu (徐刘村), Yuzhang (余张村), Tuhuang (土黄村), Zhouyang (周杨村), Wushan (伍山村), Lianghe (两河村), Zhangwang (张王村), Shuangqiao (双桥村), Gaoxu (高徐村), Xudun (徐墩村), Tangxiang (唐巷村)

=== Dawu County ===
Towns:

- Chengguan (城关镇), Yangping (阳平镇), Fangfan (芳畈镇), Xincheng (新城镇), Xiadian (夏店镇), Liuji (刘集镇), Hekou (河口镇), Sigu (四姑镇), Lüwang (吕王镇), Huangzhan (黄站镇), Xuanhuadian (宣化店镇), Fengdian (丰店镇), Daxin (大新镇), Sanli (三里镇)

Townships:

- Gaodian Township (高店乡), Pengdian Township (彭店乡), Dongxin Township (东新乡)

==== Liuji ====
One community:

- Liuji (刘集街道居委会)

Fifteen villages:

- Jinhe (金河村), Jingu (金鼓村), Dading (大顶村), Kuaigang (or Huigang) (会岗村), Tiezhai (铁寨村), Heshan (合山村), Diangang (店岗村), Liuji (刘集村), Lanchong (兰冲村), Magang (马岗村), Shahe (沙河村), Wangsi (汪寺村), Changchong (长冲村), Jianshe (建设村), Liupeng (刘棚村)

=== Xiaochang County ===
Towns:

- Huayuan (花园镇), Fengshan (丰山镇), Zhouxiang (周巷镇), Xiaohe (小河镇), Wangdian (王店镇), Weidian (卫店镇), Baisha (白沙镇), Zougang (邹岗镇)

Townships:

- Xiaowu Township (小悟乡), Jidian Township (季店乡), Huaxi Township (花西乡), Doushan Township (陡山乡)

=== Yunmeng County ===
Towns:

- Chengguan (城关镇), Yitang (义堂镇), Zengdian (曾店镇), Wupu (吴铺镇), Wuluo (伍洛镇), Xiaxindian (下辛店镇), Daoqiao (道桥镇), Geputan (隔蒲潭镇), Hujindian (胡金店镇)

Townships:

- Daodian Township (倒店乡), Shahe Township (沙河乡), Qingminghe Township (清明河乡)

== Yichang ==
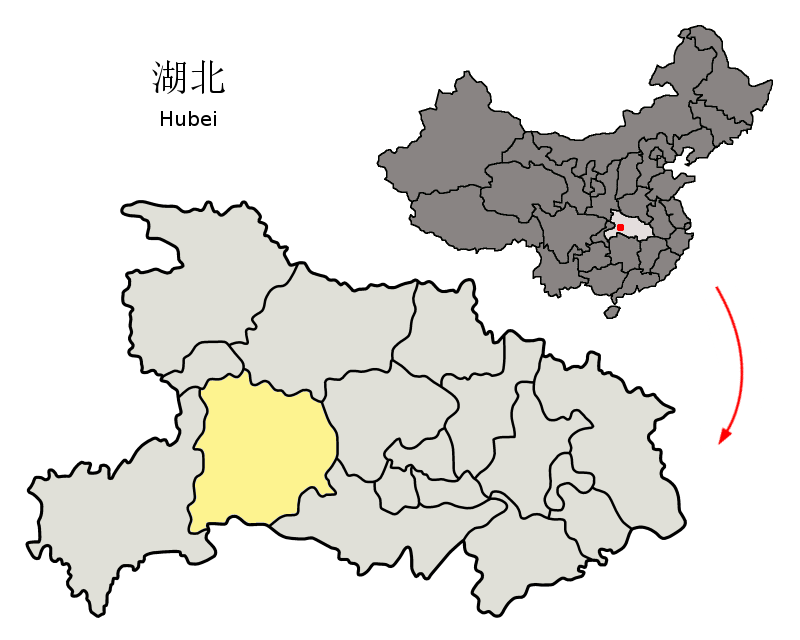
Location of Yichang in the province

=== Dianjun District ===
The only subdistrict is Dianjun Subdistrict (点军街道)

Towns:

- Aijia (艾家镇), Qiaobian (桥边镇)

Townships:

- Lianpeng Township (联棚乡), Tucheng Township (土城乡)

=== Wujiagang District ===
Subdistricts:

- Dagongqiao Subdistrict (大公桥街道), Wanshouqiao Subdistrict (万寿桥街道), Baotahe Subdistrict (宝塔河街道), Wujiagang Subdistrict (伍家岗街道)

The only township is Wujia Township (伍家乡)

=== Xiling District ===
Subdistricts:

- Xiling Subdistrict (西陵街道), Xueyuan Subdistrict (学院街道), Yunji Subdistrict (云集街道), Xiba Subdistrict (西坝街道), Gezhouba Subdistrict (葛洲坝街道), Yemingzhu Subdistrict (夜明珠街道), Development Zone Subdistrict (开发区街道)

The only township is Wowan Township (窑湾乡)

=== Xiaoting District ===
Subdistricts:

- Gulaobei Subdistrict (古老背街道), Huya Subdistrict (虎牙街道), Yunchi Subdistrict (云池街道)

=== Yiling District ===
Subdistricts:

- Xiaoxita Subdistrict (小溪塔街道), Yiling Economic Development Zone Subdistrict (夷陵经济开发区街道)

Towns:

- Zhangcunping (樟村坪镇), Wuduhe (雾渡河镇), Fenxiang (分乡镇), Taipingxi (太平溪镇), Sandouping (三斗坪镇), Letianxi (乐天溪镇), Longquan (龙泉镇), Yaqueling (鸦鹊岭镇)

Townships:

- Xiabaoping Township (下堡坪乡), Dengcun Township (邓村乡), Huanghua Township (黄花乡)

==== Taipingxi ====
One residential community:

- Wuxiangmiao (伍相庙社区)

Twelve villages:

- Xujiachong (许家冲村), Luofo (落佛村), Longtanping (龙潭坪村), Fuchengping (富城坪村), Linjiaxi (林家溪村), Meirentuo (美人沱村), Xiaoxikou (小溪口村), Hanjiawan (韩家湾村), Taipingxi (太平溪村), Changling (长岭村), Huangjiachong (黄家冲村), Gucunping (古村坪村)

==== Sandouping ====
One residential community:

- Sandouping (三斗坪社区)

Nineteen villages:

- Huanglingmiao (黄陵庙村), Huangniuyan (黄牛岩村), Nantuo (南沱村), Yuanyi (园艺村), Qipanshan (棋盘山村), Zhongbao/bu/pu (中堡村), Gaojiachong (高家冲村), Shiban (石板村), Qiuqianping (秋千坪村), Huajipo (花鸡坡村), Dongyuemiao (东岳庙村), Xinsheng (新生村), Shipai (石牌村), Tianqiao (天桥村), Zhemuping (柘木坪村), Wuhe (务河村), Toudingshi (头顶石村), Muyang (暮阳村), Baiguotang (柏果埫村)

=== Dangyang ===
Subdistricts:

- Yuyang Subdistrict (玉阳街道), Baling Subdistrict (坝陵街道), Yuquan Subdistrict (玉泉街道)

Towns:

- Lianghe (两河镇), Herong (河溶镇), Yuxi (育溪镇), Miaoqian (庙前镇), Wangdian (王店镇), Banyue (半月镇), Caobuhu (草埠湖镇)

=== Yidu ===
The only subdistrict is Lucheng Subdistrict (陆城街道)

Towns:

- Honghuatao (红花套镇), Gaobazhou (高坝洲镇), Niejiahe (聂家河镇), Songmuping (松木坪镇), Zhicheng (枝城镇), Yaojiadian (姚家店镇), Wuyanquan (五眼泉镇)

Townships:

- Panjiawan Tujia Ethnic Township (潘家湾土家族乡), Wangjiafan Township (王家畈乡)

==== Lucheng Subdistrict ====
Ten residential communities:

- Dongfeng (东风社区), Shengli (胜利社区), Qingjiang (清江社区), Mingdu (名都社区), Jiefang (解放社区), Hongchun (红春社区), Zhongbi (中笔社区), Toubi (头笔社区), Baziqiao (八字桥社区), Jinjiang (锦江社区)

Nine villages:

- Liangjianao (亮家垴村), Taibaohu (太宝湖村), Yimachong (驿马冲村), Chejiadian (车家店村), Weibi (尾笔村), Shilipu (十里铺村), Sanjiang (三江村), Baotawan (宝塔湾村), Longwo (龙窝村)

==== Zhicheng ====
Four residential communities:

- Jiefanglu (解放路社区), Datong (大同社区), Yangxi (洋溪社区), Xihu (西湖社区)

Twenty-eight villages:

- Jiaguoshan (架锅山村), Lijiaping (黎家坪村), Shuijingping (水井坪村), Zhifangchong (纸坊冲村), Liulichong (六里冲村), Zhongjiachong (钟家冲村), Yangxi (洋溪村), Heyangdian (何阳店村), Huilongdang (回龙垱村), Guandang (官垱村), Guanping (官坪村), Wufengshan (五峰山村), Baishuigang (白水港村), Sanbanhu (三板湖村), Jiudaohe (九道河村), Dayan (大堰村), Yujiaqiao (余家桥村), Quanshuihe (泉水河村), Chixihe (赤溪河村), Quanxinfan (全心畈村), Yangjinfan (洋津畈村), Yanjiang (沿江村), Huancheng (环城村), Yangheling (阳和岭村), Xiejiachong (解家冲村), Louzihe (楼子河村), Liangjiafan (梁家畈村), Longwangtai (龙王台村)

=== Zhijiang ===
The only subdistrict is Majiadian Subdistrict (马家店街道)

Towns:

- Anfusi (安福寺镇), Baiyang (白洋镇), Gujiadian (顾家店镇), Dongshi (董市镇), Xiannü (仙女镇), Wen'an (问安镇), Qixingtai (七星台镇), Bailizhou (百里洲镇)

=== Changyang Tujia Autonomous County ===
Towns:

- Longzhouping (龙舟坪镇), Gaojiayan (高家堰镇), Moshi (磨市镇), Duzhenwan (都镇湾镇), Ziqiu (资丘镇), Yuxiakou (渔峡口镇), Langping (榔坪镇), Hejiaping (贺家坪镇)

Townships:

- Dayan Township (大堰乡), Yazikou Township (鸭子口乡), Huoshaoping Township (火烧坪乡)

=== Wufeng Tujia Autonomous County ===
Towns:

- Wufeng (五峰镇), Changleping (长乐坪镇), Yuyangguan (渔洋关镇), Renheping (仁和坪镇), Wantan (湾潭镇)

Townships:

- Fujiayan Township (付家堰乡), Niuzhuang Township (牛庄乡), Caihua Township (采花乡)

=== Xingshan County ===
Towns:

- Gufu (古夫镇), Zhaojun (昭君镇), Xiakou (峡口镇), Nanyang (南阳镇), Huangliang (黄粮镇), Shuiyuesi (水月寺镇)

Townships:

- Gaoqiao Township (高桥乡), Bangzi Township (榛子乡)

=== Yuan'an County ===
Towns:

- Mingfeng (鸣凤镇), Hualinsi (花林寺镇), Jiuxian (旧县镇), Yangping (洋坪镇), Maopingchang (茅坪场镇), Hehua (荷花镇)

The only township is Hekou Township (河口乡)

=== Zigui County ===
Towns:

- Maoping (茅坪镇), Guizhou (归州镇), Quyuan (屈原镇), Shazhenxi (沙镇溪镇), Lianghekou (两河口镇), Guojiaba (郭家坝镇), Yanglinqiao (杨林桥镇), Jiuwanxi (九畹溪镇)

Townships:

- Shuitianba Township (水田坝乡), Xietan Township (泄滩乡), Meijiahe Township (梅家河乡), Moping Township (磨坪乡)

==== Maoping ====
Four residential communities:

- Binhu (滨湖社区), Xichu (西楚社区), Jusong (橘颂社区), Danyang (丹阳社区)

Eighteen villages:

- Jingangcheng (金缸城村), Yinxingtuo (银杏沱村), Changling (长岭村), Chenjiachong (陈家冲村), Jiuli (九里村), Yangguidian (杨贵店村), Chenjiaba (陈家坝村), Jiandong (建东村), Xikouping (溪口坪村), Sixi (四溪村), Qiaojiaping (乔家坪村), Huaguoyuan (花果园村), Yueliangbao (月亮包村), Luojia (罗家村), Songshu'ao (松树坳村), Zhongbazi (中坝子村), Lanlingxi (兰陵溪村), Miaohe (庙河村)
