= Hongshan =

Hongshan may refer to:

== Places in China ==
=== Districts ===
- Hongshan District, Chifeng (红山区) in Chifeng, Inner Mongolia
- Hongshan District, Wuhan (洪山区) in Wuhan, Hubei

=== Subdistricts ===
- Hongshan Subdistrict, Changsha (洪山街道), in Kaifu District, Changsha, Hunan
- Hongshan Subdistrict, Wuhan (洪山街道), a subdistrict in Hongshan District, Hubei
- Hongshan Subdistrict (鸿山街道), a subdistrict of Wuxi New Area, Wuxi, Jiangsu
- Hongshan Subdistrict (红山街道), a subdistrict of Xuanwu District, Jiangsu

=== Townships ===
- Hongshan Township, Changting County, a township of Fujian
- Hongshan Township, Luojiang District, a township of Fujian
- Hongshan Township, Yongding County, a township of Fujian

=== Towns and villages ===
- Hongshan, Jinzhong (洪善镇) in Pingyao County, Jinzhong, Shanxi
- Hongshan, Shishi (鸿山镇), a town in Shishi, Fujian
- Hongshan, Wanquan (洪善村), a village in Wanquan, Hubei
- Hongshan, Yingshan County (红山镇), a town in Yingshan County, Huanggang, Hubei

Written as "洪山镇"

- Hongshan, Anhui in Taihe County, Fuyang
- Hongshan, Fuzhou, Fujian, a town in Gulou District, Fujian
- Hongshan, Sui County, in Sui County, Hubei
- Hongshan, Hengnan, in Hengnan County, Hunan
- Hongshan, Shandong, a town in Zichuan District, Zibo
- Hongshan, Suizhou, a town in Sui County, Hubei
- Hongshan, Jiexiu, a town in Jiexiu, Shanxi

== Other ==
- Hongshan culture (红山文化), Neolithic culture in northeastern China
- Hong Shan (红山), a mountain in Ürümqi
- Hongshan station (disambiguation), Shenzhen metro
- HongShan, a Chinese venture capital firm
- Bukit Merah or known as Redhill, a planning area in the central part of Singapore (红山)

== See also ==
- Zhongshan (disambiguation)
