= Yonglong =

Yonglong may refer to:

== Locations ==
- Yonglong Shoal, or Yonglongsha (Chinese: 永隆沙), former island in Yangtze River above Chongming Island in China
- Yonglong (永漋镇), a town in Jingshan County, Jingmen, Hubei, China

== Historical eras ==
- Yonglong (永隆, 618–628), era name used by Liang Shidu
- Yonglong (永隆, 680–681), era name used by Emperor Gaozong of Tang
- Yonglong (永隆, 939–943), era name used by Wang Yanxi, emperor of Min
