= Xinwu =

Xinwu may refer to:

- Xinwu District, Taoyuan (新屋區), district of Taoyuan, Taiwan
- Xinwu District, Wuxi (新吴区), district of Wuxi, Jiangsu, China
- Xinwu, Gaocheng, a village in Gaocheng, Sui County, Suizhou, Hubei, China
