= Chengbei Subdistrict, Yingcheng =

Chengbei Subdistrict 城北街道
- Subdistrict
- Location in Hubei
- Coordinates: 30°57′44″N 113°34′45″E
- Country: People's Republic of China
- Province: Hubei
- Prefecture-level city: Xiaogan
- County-level city: Yingcheng
- Elevation: 30 m (98 ft)

Population (2010)
  - Total: 43,785
- Time zone: UTC+8 (China Standard)

Chengbei Subdistrict (Chinese: 城北街道; pinyin: Chéngběi Jiēdào; lit. 'city north') is a subdistrict of Yingcheng in Xiaogan, eastern Hubei, People's Republic of China, located in the northern outskirts of the Yingcheng's urban area as its name suggests.

== Administrative divisions ==
As of 2011, it has 3 residential communities (社区) and 33 villages under its administration.

Communities:

- Qixingqiao (七星桥社区), Gaodujie (膏都街社区), Xinjianjie (新建街社区), Zhaofan (赵畈社区)

Villages:

- Changyan (长堰村), Jiangxiang (姜巷村), Beishi (北十村), Wanqiao (万桥村), Yangfan (杨畈村), C/Shengtan (盛滩村), Wulou (吴楼村), Gaoqiao (高桥村), Sunyan (孙堰村), Fugang (付岗村), Hanwan (韩湾村), Douhe (陡河村), Zouguo (邹郭村), Liulin (柳林村), Weihe (魏河村), Xiaoliao (肖廖村), Niepo (聂坡村), Songpo (宋坡村), Lizui (李咀村), Leishan (雷山村), Wangmiao (王庙村), Rehuo (热火村), Gonghe (龚河村), Daihe (戴河村), Xuhuang (徐黄村), Baima (白马村), Baiyang (白杨社区村), Jidun (季墩社区村), Hongtang (红堂村), Xishi (西十村), Chapeng (茶棚村), Xingguang (星光村)

== See also ==
- List of township-level divisions of Hubei
