= Zhashan Subdistrict =

Zhashan 奓山街道
- Subdistrict
- Location in Hubei
- Coordinates: 30°26′51″N 114°00′39″E
- Country: People's Republic of China
- Province: Hubei
- Sub-provincial city: Wuhan
- District: Caidian

Area
  - Total: 122.03 km^{2} (47.12 sq mi)

Population (2011)
  - Total: 58,988
- Time zone: UTC+8 (China Standard)

Zhashan Subdistrict (Chinese: 奓山街道; pinyin: Zhāshān Jiēdào) is a subdistrict in Caidian District, Wuhan, Hubei, China.

== History ==
In 1949, Zhashan was part of Hanyang First District. In 1950 it was part of Sixth District. In 1951 & 1955 it was part of Seventh District. In 1956, the area was named Zhashan Leadership Group. In 1958 it was part of Chaoyang Commune. In 1961, it was part if Daji District. In 1975, Yong'an District Xinmin Commune, Daji District Xinhua Commune and Zhashan Commune were combined into Zhashan Commune. In March 1984, Zhashan was made into a township and in December 1984, it was made into a town. In June 2000, Zhashan was made into a subdistrict.

== Administrative divisions ==
Four communities:

- Zhashan Community (奓山社区), Zhashanxin (奓山新社区), Xingguang (星光社区), Dadong Community (大东社区)

Thirty-seven villages:

- Dadong Village (大东村), Xiaodong (小东村), Hongyan (红焰村), Xingguang (星光村), Lianyi (联谊村), Lianmeng (联盟村), Qiulin (丘林村), Laoshichen (老世陈村), Luosigang (螺丝岗村), Sanhong (三红村), Tanshu (檀树村), Zhongyuan (中原村), Changxin (长新村), Xiaguang (霞光村), Qianfeng (前峰村), Shuangfeng (双丰村), Zhashan Village (奓山村), Conglin (丛林村), Xin'anbu (新安堡村), Liuhuan (留环村), Yuanling (袁岭村), Qunyan (群雁村), Dingjiu (丁九村), Yizhi (一致村), Fanli (凡里村), Luojia (罗家村), Chenjia (陈家村), Zhujia (祝家村), Xinsheng (新生村), Sanjiadian (三家店村), Sanyang (三羊村), Minsheng (民生村), Xingli (兴力村), Xinji (新集村), You'ai (友爱村), Qunjian (群建村), Jinniu (金牛村)
