= Yuzhai =

Yuzhai 于寨镇
- Town
- Location within China
- Coordinates: 33°5′16″N 115°15′43″E
- Country: China
- Province: Anhui
- Prefecture-level city: Fuyang
- District: Yanqing District
- Time zone: UTC+8 (China Standard)

Yuzhai is a town in Linquan County of Fuyang, Anhui, China.
