= Shangshi, Hubei =

Shangshi 尚市镇
- Town
- Location in Hubei
- Coordinates: 31°58′0″N 113°16′0″E
- Country: People's Republic of China
- Province: Hubei
- Prefecture-level city: Suizhou
- County: Sui County
- Time zone: UTC+8 (China Standard)

Shangshi (Chinese: 尚市; pinyin: Shàngshì) is a town under the administration of Sui County, Hubei, China. As of 2023, it administers Shangshidian (尚市店) Residential Community and the following nineteen villages:

- Nangang Village (南岗村)
- Longmai Village (龙脉村)
- Qunjin Village (群金村)
- Youyu Village (有余村)
- Shejiu Village (社九村)
- Xingshen Village (星申村)
- Qunyue Village (群岳村)
- Xingyu Village (星雨村)
- Qunxiang Village (群祥村)
- Xuyi Village (旭益村)
- Xinggong Village (星巩村)
- Xingmo Village (星模村)
- Xinghe Village (星河村)
- Sujia Village (苏家村)
- Wangjiahe Village (王家河村)
- Mintai Village (民太村)
- Taishan Village (太山村)
- Aopeng Village (敖棚村)
- Jingmingpu Village (净明铺村)
