= Hongshan station =

Hongshan station may refer to:

- Hongshan station (Luoyang Subway), a station on Line 1 of the Luoyang Subway in Luoyang, China.
- Hongshan station (Shenzhen Metro), a station on the Shenzhen Metro in Shenzhen, China

== See also ==
- Redhill railway station, a National Rail station on Brighton Main Line in Redhill, Surrey, England.
- Redhill MRT station, a station on the MRT in Singapore.
