= Sui County, Hubei =

Sui County 随县
- County
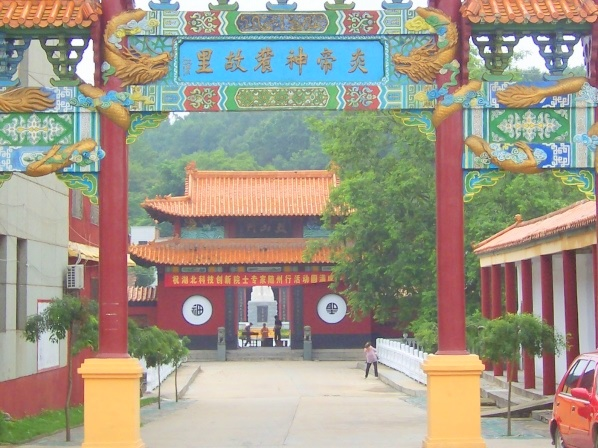
- Yandi Guli (炎帝故里)

- Location of the seat in Hubei
- Coordinates: 31°51′14″N 113°17′58″E
- Country: People's Republic of China
- Province: Hubei
- Prefecture-level city: Suizhou

Area
  - Total: 5,528 km^{2} (2,134 sq mi)

Population (2020 census)
  - Total: 637,548
  - Density: 115.3/km^{2} (298.7/sq mi)
- Time zone: UTC+8 (China Standard)
- Website: suizhou.gov.cn (in Chinese)

Sui County or Suixian (simplified Chinese: 随县; traditional Chinese: 隨縣; pinyin: Suí Xiàn) is a county located in northern Hubei province, People's Republic of China, bordering Henan province to the north. It is under the administration of Suizhou City and was established in May 2009. It was the location of the minor state of Li during the Warring States period, and was conquered by Chu at some point.

== Administrative divisions ==
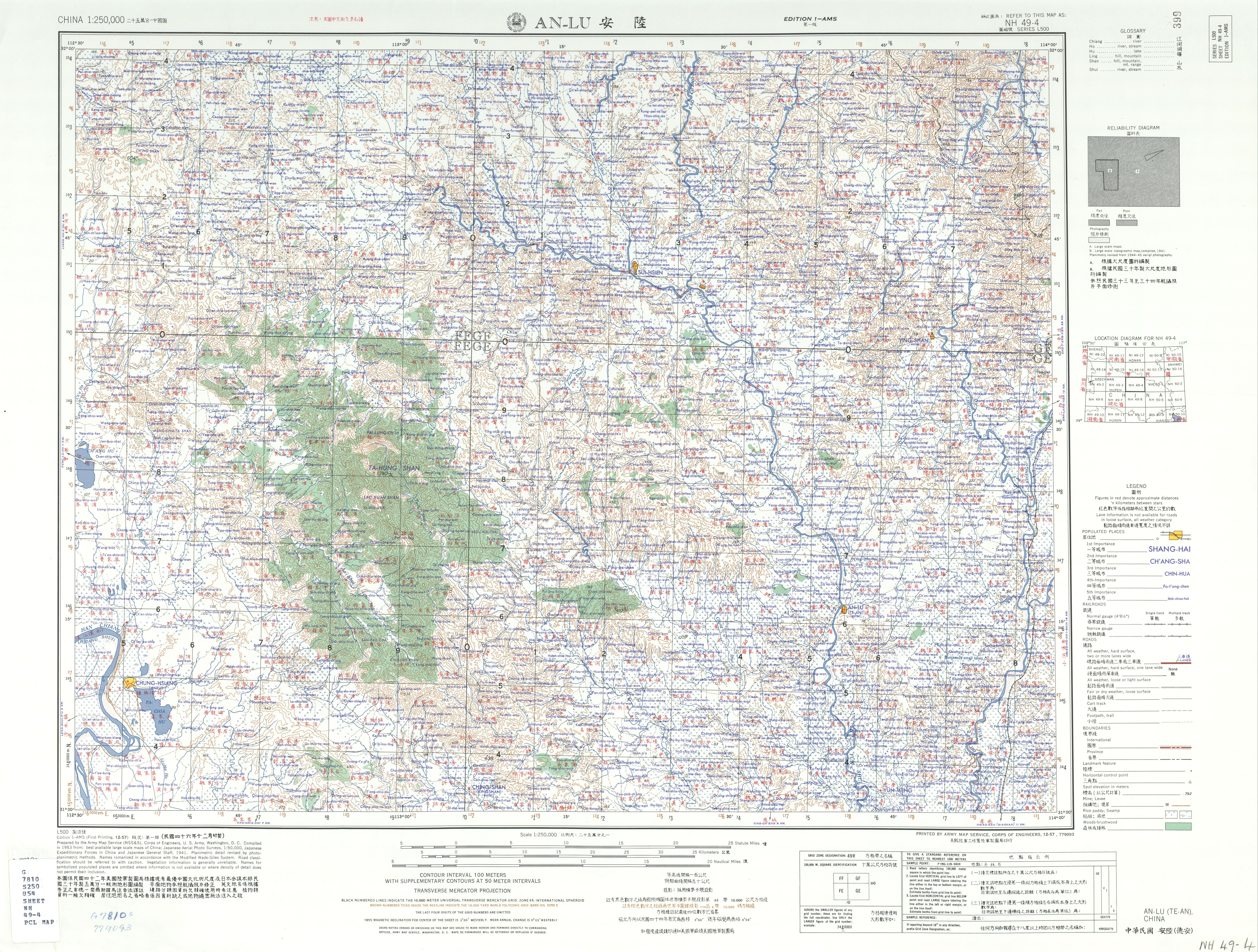
Map including Sui County (labeled as SUI-HSIEN (walled) 隨縣) (1953)

Nineteen towns:

- Lishan (厉山镇), Gaocheng (高城镇), Yindian (殷店镇), Caodian (草店镇), Xiaolin (小林镇), Huaihe (淮河镇), Wanhe (万和镇), Shangshi (尚市镇), Tangxian (唐县镇), Wushan (吴山镇), Xinjie (新街镇), Anju (安居镇), Huantan (澴潭镇) (sometimes written as 环潭镇), Hongshan (洪山镇), Changgang (长岗镇), Sanligang (三里岗镇), Liulin (柳林镇), Junchuan (均川镇), Wanfudian (万福店镇) (formerly Wanfu (万福镇))
