= Gaocheng, Hubei =

Gaocheng 高城镇
- Town
- Location in Hubei
- Coordinates: 31°56′45″N 113°26′54″E
- Country: People's Republic of China
- Province: Hubei
- Prefecture-level city: Suizhou
- County: Sui
- Village-level divisions: 1 residential community 13 villages
- Elevation: 105 m (344 ft)
- Time zone: UTC+8 (China Standard)
- Postal code: 431533

Gaocheng (Chinese: 高城; pinyin: Gāochéng; lit. 'high city') is a town of Sui County in northeastern Hubei province, China, located in the western foothills of the Dabie Mountains about 17 kilometres (11 mi) northeast of the county seat. As of 2018, it has 1 residential community (社区) and 13 villages under its administration.

== Administrative divisions ==
One community:

- Gaocheng (高城居委会)

Thirteen villages:

- Daqiao (大桥村), Longwangmiao (龙王庙村), Meizigou (梅子沟村), Leijiaci (雷家祠村), Qilita (七里塔村), Xinwu (新屋村), Sanqingguan (三清观村), Luojiaqiao (罗家桥村), Qianjin (前进村), Xiejiadian (卸甲店村), Qigudian (七姑店村), Songduo (嵩垛村), Gaohuang (高黄村)

== See also ==
- List of township-level divisions of Hubei
