= Yonglong, Hubei =

Yonglong 永漋镇
- Town
- Location in Hubei
- Coordinates: 30°46′20″N 112°50′03″E
- Country: People's Republic of China
- Province: Hubei
- Prefecture-level city: Jingmen
- County-level city: Jingshan
- Villages: 30

Area
  - Total: 100 km^{2} (39 sq mi)

Population (2011)
  - Total: 48,817
  - Density: 490/km^{2} (1,300/sq mi)
- Time zone: UTC+8 (China Standard)
- Postal code: 431825

Yonglong, Hubei
- Simplified Chinese: 永漋镇
Transcriptions
Standard Mandarin
- Hanyu Pinyin: Yǒnglóng Zhèn

Yonglong (Chinese: 永漋镇; pinyin: Yǒnglóng Zhèn) or (Chinese: 永隆镇) (Note: The rarely used character 漋 (lóng) is often written as the more commonly encountered and homophone character 隆 (lóng), which is the phonetic component of 漋.) is a town under the administration of the county-level city of Jingshan, Hubei, China.

== Administrative divisions ==
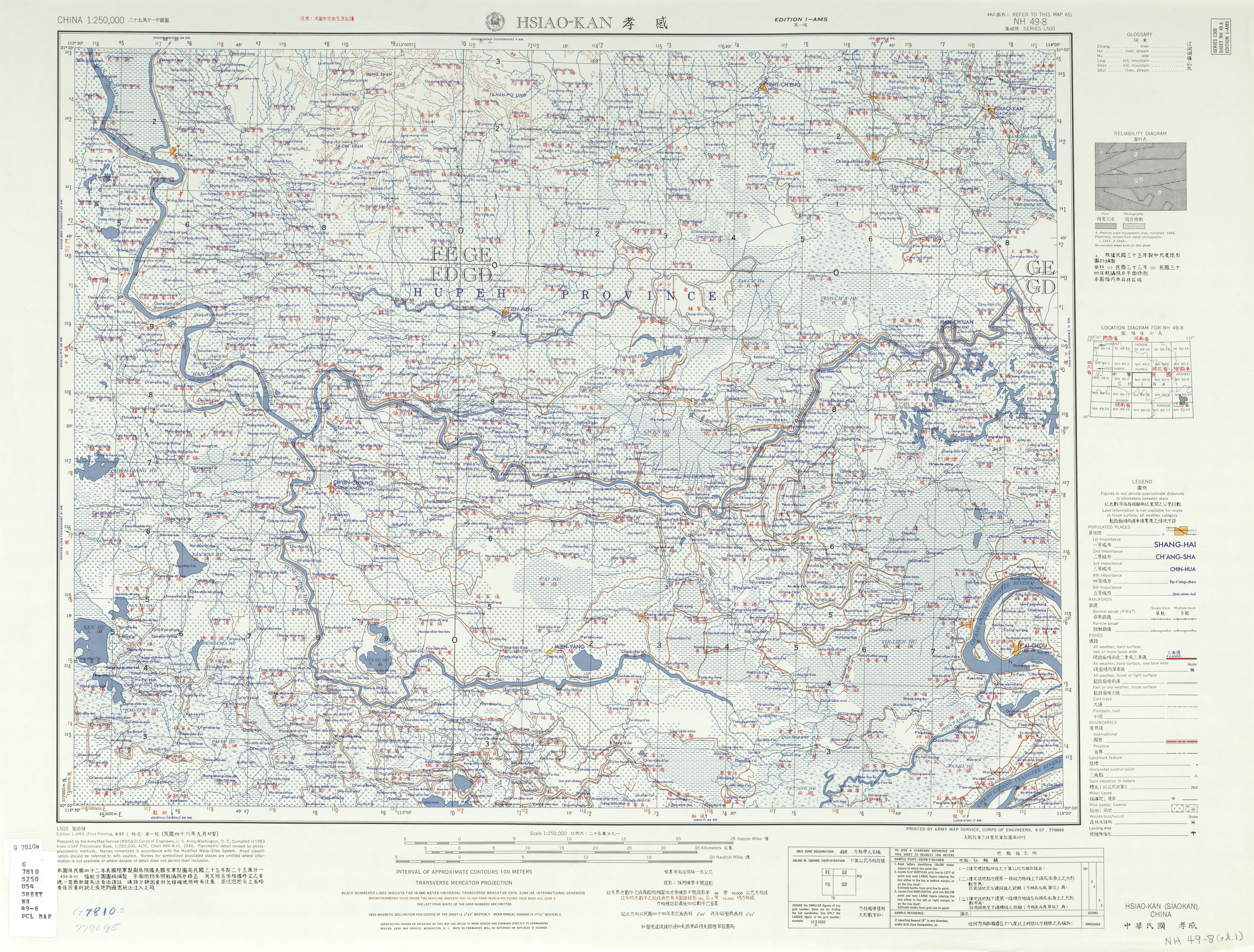
Map including Yonglonghe (labeled as Yung-lung-ho 永漋河) (1953)

The town is made up of two communities and thirty villages:

| Name | Chinese (S) | Pinyin |
|---|---|---|
| Yonglongjie | 永漋街社区 | Yǒnglóngjiē Shèqū |
| Yangfengjie | 杨浲街社区 | Yángféngjiē Shèqū |
| Tongyi | 同益村 | Tóngyì Cūn |
| Qinglong'an | 青龙庵村 | Qīnglóng'ān Cūn |
| Qingnian | 青年村 | Qīngnián Cūn |
| Zhangjialing | 张家岭村 | Zhāngjiālǐng Cūn |
| Mantianxing | 满天星村 | Mǎntiānxīng Cūn |
| Luxiangtai | 卢相台村 (楼相台) | Lúxiàngtái Cūn |
| Gongyi | 公益村 | Gōngyì Cūn |
| Zhangchangtai | 张常台村 | Zhāngchángtái Cūn |
| Hongqi | 红旗村 | Hóngqí Cūn |
| Jiajiakou | 贾家口(贾家台) | Jiǎjiākǒu Cūn |
| Liujiazha | 刘家榨村 | Liújiāzhà Cūn |
| Qunli | 群力村 | Qúnlì Cūn |
| Shibanxiang | 石板巷村 | Shíbǎnxiàng Cūn |
| Zengkou | 罾口村 (曾口) | Zēngkǒu Cūn |
| Taojialing | 陶家岭村 | Táojiālǐng Cūn |
| Majialing | 马家岭村 | Mǎjiālǐng Cūn |
| Shinüshan | 石女山村 | Shínǚshān Cūn |
| Guchengkou | 古城口村 | Gǔchéngkǒu Cūn |
| Yangjiafeng | 杨家浲村 | Yángjiāféng Cūn |
| Yanjiadun | 严家墩村 | Yánjiādūn Cūn |
| Niefan | 聂畈村 | Nièfàn Cūn |
| Gaohujie | 高湖街村 | Gāohújiē Cūn |
| Lijialing | 黎家岭(黎家大岭) | Líjiālǐng Cūn |
| Lijiayuan | 黎家垸村 | Líjiāyuàn Cūn |
| Lühua | 绿化村 | Lǜhuà Cūn |
| Shangchenqiao | 上陈桥村 | Shàngchénqiáo Cūn |
| Hongguang | 红光村 | Hóngguāng Cūn |
| Fanjiaxiang | 樊家巷村 | Fánjiāxiàng Cūn |
| Xinhekou | 新河口村 | Xīnhékǒu Cūn |
| Xiachenqiao | 下陈桥村 | Xiàchénqiáo Cūn |

== Demographics ==
Historical population
| Year | Pop. | ±% p.a. |
|---|---|---|
| 2000 | 41,849 | — |
| 2010 | 48,817 | +1.55% |
2000, 2010 totals
