= Daihe =

Daihe 戴河镇
- Town
- Dàihé Zhèn
- Location in Hebei Location in China
- Coordinates: 39°50′56″N 119°25′15″E
- Country: People's Republic of China
- Province: Hebei
- Prefecture-level city: Qinhuangdao
- District: Beidaihe

Area
  - Total: 38.58 km^{2} (14.90 sq mi)

Population (2010)
  - Total: 36,313
  - Density: 941.2/km^{2} (2,438/sq mi)
- Time zone: UTC+8 (China Standard)

Daihe (Chinese: 戴河镇; pinyin: Dàihé Zhèn) is a town located in Beidaihe District, Qinhuangdao, Hebei, China. According to the 2010 census, Daihe had a population of 36,313, including 17,327 males and 18,986 females. The population was distributed as follows: 3,653 people aged under 14, 29,841 people aged between 15 and 64, and 2,819 people aged over 65.

== See also ==
- List of township-level divisions of Hebei
