= List of township-level divisions of Hubei =

Location of Hubei province in China

This is a list of township-level divisions of the province of Hubei, People's Republic of China (PRC). After province, prefecture, and county-level divisions, township-level divisions constitute the formal fourth-level administrative divisions of the PRC. As of late 2016, there were over 1,000 such divisions in Hubei, including 307 subdistricts, 759 towns, and 168 townships. After changes, as of late 2017, there were 308 subdistricts, 761 towns, and 165 townships (including 19 ethnic townships). This list is divided first into the prefecture-level then the county-level divisions.

== Wuhan ==
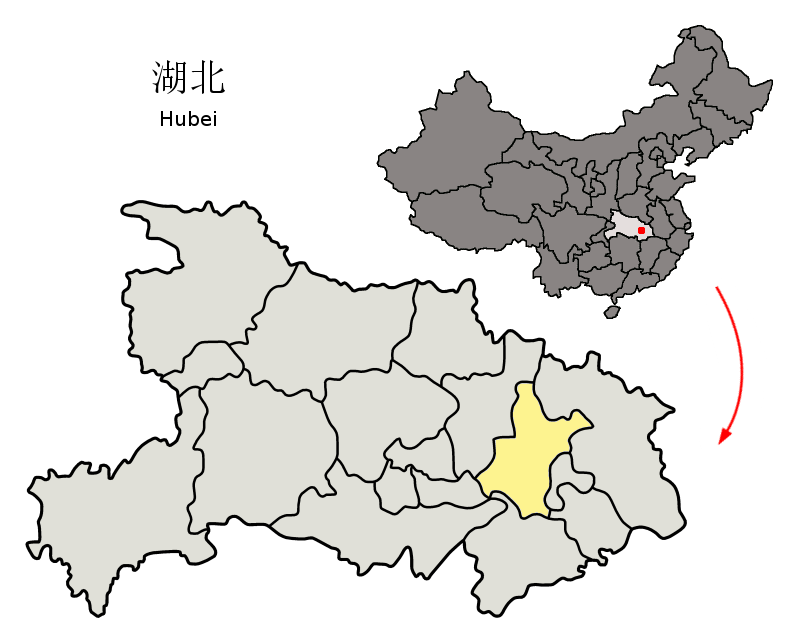
Location of Wuhan in the province

=== Caidian District ===
Subdistricts:

- Caidian Subdistrict (蔡甸街道), Zhashan Subdistrict (奓山街道), Yong'an Subdistrict (永安街道), Zhuru Subdistrict (侏儒街道), Daji Subdistrict (大集街道), Zhangwan Subdistrict (张湾街道), Zhuankou Avenue Subdistrict (沌口街街道), Junshan Subdistrict (军山街道)

Towns:

- Suohe (索河镇), Yuxian (玉贤镇)

The only township is Xiaosi Township (消泗乡)

=== Dongxihu District ===
Subdistricts:

- Wujiashan Subdistrict (吴家山街道), Baiquan/Boquan Subdistrict (柏泉街道), Jiangjun Road Subdistrict (将军路街道), Cihui Subdistrict (慈惠街道), Zoumaling Subdistrict (走马岭街道), Jinghe Subdistrict (径河街道), Changqing Subdistrict (长青街道), Xin'andu Subdistrict (辛安渡街道), Dongshan Subdistrict (东山街道), Changqinghuayuan New Area Subdistrict (常青花园新区街道), Xingouzhen Subdistrict (新沟镇街道), Jinyinhu Subdistrict (金银湖街道)

=== Hannan District ===
Subdistricts:

- Shamao Subdistrict (纱帽街道), Dengnan Subdistrict (邓南街道), Dongjing Subdistrict (东荆街道), Xiangkou Subdistrict (湘口街道)

=== Hanyang District ===
Subdistricts:

- Jianqiao Subdistrict (建桥街道), Longyang Subdistrict (龙阳街道), Sixin Subdistrict (四新街道), Qingchuan Subdistrict (晴川街街道), Yingwu Subdistrict (鹦鹉街道), Zhoutou Subdistrict (洲头街道), Wulidun Subdistrict (五里墩街道), Qinduankou Subdistrict (琴断口街道), Jianghan'erqiao Subdistrict (江汉二桥街道), Yongfeng Subdistrict (永丰街道), Jiangdi Subdistrict (江堤街道)

Areas:

- Hanyang Economic Development Zone 汉阳经济开发区, Sixin Area 四新地区

=== Hongshan District ===
Nine subdistricts:

- Luonan Subdistrict (珞南街道), Guanshan Subdistrict (关山街道), Shizishan Subdistrict (狮子山街道), Zhangjiawan Subdistrict (张家湾街道), Liyuan Subdistrict (梨园街道), Zhuodaoquan Subdistrict (卓刀泉街道), Hongshan Subdistrict (洪山街道), Heping Subdistrict (和平街道), Qingling Subdistrict (青菱街道)

The only township is Tianxing Township (天兴乡)

Two other areas:

- Qingtanhu (清潭湖/清谭湖办事处), Donghu Scenic Area Subdistrict (东湖风景区街道)

=== Huangpi District ===
Subdistricts:

- Qianchuan Subdistrict (前川街道), Qijiawan Subdistrict (祁家湾街道), Hengdian Subdistrict (横店街道), Luohansi Subdistrict (罗汉寺街道), Shekou Subdistrict (滠口街道), Liuzhidian Subdistrict (六指店街道), Tianhe Subdistrict (天河街道), Wangjiahe Subdistrict (王家河街道), Changxuanling Subdistrict (长轩岭街道), Liji Subdistrict (李集街道), Yaoji Subdistrict (姚集街道), Caizha Subdistrict (蔡榨街道), Wuhu Subdistrict (武湖街道)

The only town is Sanli (三里镇)

Townships:

- Caidian Township (蔡店乡), Mulan Township (木兰乡)

=== Jiang'an District ===
Subdistricts:

- Dazhi Subdistrict (大智街道), Yiyuan Subdistrict (一元街道), Chezhan Subdistrict (车站街道), Siwei Subdistrict (四唯街道), Yongqing Subdistrict (永清街道), Xima Subdistrict (西马街道), Qiuchang Subdistrict (球场街道), Laodong Subdistrict (劳动街道), Erqi Subdistrict (二七街道), Xincun Subdistrict (新村街道), Danshuichi Subdistrict (丹水池街道), Taibei Subdistrict (台北街道), Huaqiao Subdistrict (花桥街道), Shenjiaji Subdistrict

Other Areas:

- Houhu Office (后湖街办事处), Tazihu Office (塔子湖街办事处)

=== Jianghan District ===
Thirteen subdistricts:

- Minzu Subdistrict (民族街道), Hualou Subdistrict (花楼街道), Shuita Subdistrict (水塔街道), Minquan Subdistrict (民权街道), Manchun Subdistrict (满春街道), Minyi Subdistrict (民意街道), Xinhua Subdistrict (新华街道), Wansong Subdistrict (万松街道), Tangjiadun Subdistrict (唐家墩街道), Beihu Subdistrict (北湖街道), Qianjin Subdistrict (前进街道), Changqing Subdistrict (常青街道), Hanxing Subdistrict (汉兴街道)

=== Jiangxia District ===
Subdistricts:

- Zhifang Subdistrict (纸坊街道), Jinkou Subdistrict (金口街道), Wulongquan Subdistrict (乌龙泉街道), Zhengdian Subdistrict (郑店街道), Liufang Subdistrict (流芳街道), Wulijie Subdistrict (五里界街道), Jinshui Subdistrict (金水街道), Anshan Subdistrict (安山街道), Shanpo Subdistrict (山坡街道), Fozuling Subdistrict (佛祖岭街道), Baoxie Subdistrict (豹澥街道), Binhu Subdistrict (滨湖街道)

Towns:

- Fasi (法泗镇), Husi (湖泗镇)

The only township is Shu'an Township (舒安乡)

=== Qiaokou District ===
Eleven subdistricts:

- Gutian Subdistrict (古田街道), Hanjiadun Subdistrict (韩家墩街道), Zongguan Subdistrict (宗关街道), Hanshuiqiao Subdistrict (汉水桥街道), Baofeng Subdistrict (宝丰街道), Ronghua Subdistrict (荣华街道), Hanzhong Subdistrict (汉中街道), Hanzheng Subdistrict (汉正街道), Liujiaoting Subdistrict (六角亭街道), Changfeng Subdistrict (长丰街道), Yijia Subdistrict (易家街道)

=== Qingshan District ===
Subdistricts:

- Hongwei Road Subdistrict (红卫路街道), Yejin Subdistrict (冶金街道), Xingouqiao Subdistrict (新沟桥街道), Honggangcheng Subdistrict (红钢城街道), Gongrencun Subdistrict (工人村街道), Qingshanzhen Subdistrict (青山镇街道), Changqian Subdistrict (厂前街道), Wudong Subdistrict (武东街道), Baiyushan Subdistrict (白玉山街道), Ganghuacun Subdistrict (钢花村街道), Gangduhuayuan Subdistrict (钢都花园街道管委会)

Other: Beihu Administrative Committee Subdistrict (北湖管委会街道)

=== Wuchang District ===
Fifteen subdistricts:

- Jiyuqiao Subdistrict (积玉桥街道), Yangyuan Subdistrict (杨园街道), Xujiapeng Subdistrict (徐家棚街道), Liangdao Subdistrict (粮道街道), Zhonghualu Subdistrict (中华路街道), Huanghelou Subdistrict (黄鹤楼街道), Ziyang Subdistrict (紫阳街道), Baishazhou Subdistrict (白沙洲街道), Shouyilu Subdistrict (首义路街道), Zhongnanlu Subdistrict (中南路街道), Shuiguohu Subdistrict (水果湖街道), Luojiashan Subdistrict (珞珈山街道), Shidong Subdistrict (石洞街道), Nanhu Subdistrict (南湖街道), Donghu Scenic Area Subdistrict (东湖风景区街道)

=== Xinzhou District ===
Subdistricts:

- Zhucheng Subdistrict (邾城街道), Yangluo Subdistrict (阳逻街道), Cangbu Subdistrict (仓埠街道), Wangji Subdistrict (汪集街道), Liji Subdistrict (李集街道), Sandian Subdistrict (三店街道), Pantang Subdistrict (潘塘街道), Jiujie Subdistrict (旧街街道), Shuangliu Subdistrict (双柳街道), Zhangduhu Subdistrict (涨渡湖街道)

Towns:

- Xinchong (辛冲镇), Xugu (徐古镇), Fenghuang (凤凰镇)

== Enshi Tujia and Miao Autonomous Prefecture ==
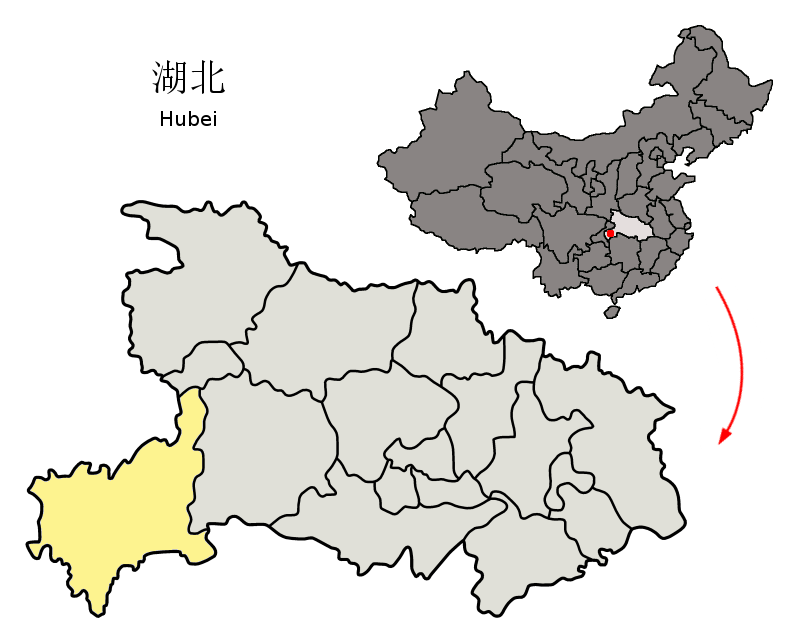
Location of Enshi Tujia and Miao Autonomous Prefecture in the province

=== Enshi City ===
Three subdistricts:

- Wuyangba Subdistrict (舞阳坝街道), Liujiaoting Subdistrict (六角亭街道), Xiaoduchuan Subdistrict (小渡船街道)

Five towns:

- Longfeng (龙凤镇), Cuiba (崔坝镇), Banqiao (板桥镇), Baiyangping (白杨坪镇), Sancha (三岔镇)

Eight townships:

- Xintang Township (新塘乡), Hongtu Township (红土乡), Shadi Township (沙地乡), Taiyanghe Township (太阳河乡), Tunbao Township (屯堡乡), Baiguo Township (白果乡), Bajiao Dong Ethnic Township (芭蕉侗族乡), Shengjiaba Township (盛家坝乡)

Other area:

- Mufu (沐抚办事处)

=== Lichuan ===
Two subdistricts:

- Duting Subdistrict (都亭街道), Dongcheng Subdistrict (东城街道)

Seven towns:

- Moudao (谋道镇), Baiyangba (柏杨坝镇), Wangying (汪营镇), Jiannan (建南镇), Zhonglu (忠路镇), Tuanbao (团堡镇), Maoba (毛坝镇)

Five townships:

- Liangwu Township (凉雾乡), Yuanbao Township (元堡乡), Nanping Township (南坪乡), Wendou Township (文斗乡), Shaxi Township (沙溪乡)

=== Badong County ===
Ten towns:

- Badong (信陵镇), Dongrang/nangkou (东瀼口镇), Yanduhe (沿渡河镇), Guandukou (官渡口镇), Chadianzi (茶店子镇), Lücongpo (绿葱坡镇), Dazhiping (大支坪镇), Yesanguan (野三关镇), Shuibuya (水布垭镇), Qingtaiping (清太坪镇)

Two townships:

- Xiqiuwan Township (溪丘湾乡), Jinguoping Township (金果坪乡)

=== Hefeng County ===
Five towns:

- Zouma (走马镇), Rongmei (容美镇), Taiping (太平镇), Yanzi (燕子镇), Zhongying (中营镇)

Four townships:

- Tielu Township (铁炉乡), Wuli Township (五里乡), Xiaping Township (下坪乡), Wuyang Township (邬阳乡)

=== Jianshi County ===
Seven towns:

- Yezhou (业州镇), Gaoping (高坪镇), Hongyansi (红岩寺镇), Jingyang (景阳镇), Guandian (官店镇), Huaping (花坪镇), Changliang (长梁镇)

Three townships:

- Maotian Township (茅田乡), Longping Township (龙坪乡), Sanli Township (三里乡)

=== Laifeng County ===
Six towns:

- Xiangfeng (翔凤镇), Baifusi (百福司镇), Dahe (大河镇), Lüshui (绿水镇), Jiusi (旧司镇), Geleche (革勒车镇)

Two townships:

- Manshui Township (漫水乡), Sanhu Township (三胡乡)

=== Xianfeng County ===
Six towns:

- Gaoleshan (高乐山镇), Zhongbao (忠堡镇), Pingbaying (坪坝营镇), Chaoyangsi (朝阳寺镇), Qingping (清坪镇), Tangya (唐崖镇)

Four townships:

- Dingzhai Township (丁寨乡), Huolongping Township (活龙坪乡), Xiaocun Township (小村乡), Huangjindong Township (黄金洞乡)

One other area:

- Daluba Zone (大路坝区)

=== Xuan'en County ===
Five towns:

- Zhushan (珠山镇), Jiaoyuan (椒园镇), Shadaogou (沙道沟镇), Lijiahe (李家河镇) Gaoluo (高罗镇)

Four townships:

- Wanzhai Township (万寨乡), Changtanhe Dong Ethnic Township (长潭河侗族乡), Xiaoguan Dong Ethnic Township (晓关侗族乡), Chunmuying Township (椿木营乡)

== Ezhou ==
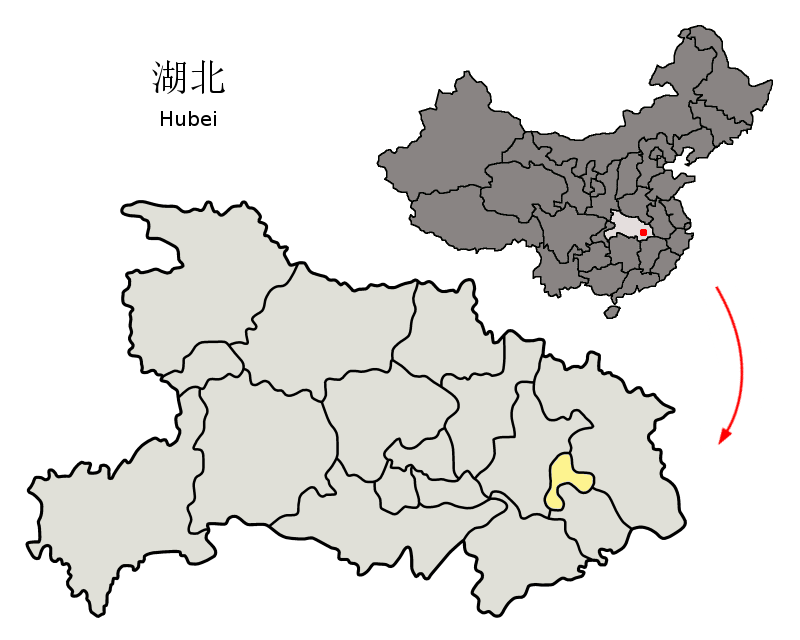
Location of Ezhou in the province

=== Echeng District ===
Three subdistricts:

- Fenghuang Subdistrict (凤凰街道), Gulou Subdistrict (古楼街道), Xishan Subdistrict (西山街道)

Nine towns:

- Zelin (泽林镇), Dushan (杜山镇), Xinmiao (新庙镇), Bishidu (碧石渡镇), Tingzu (汀祖镇), Yanji (燕矶镇), Yangye (杨叶镇), Huahu (花湖镇), Changgang (长港镇)

The only township is Shawo Township (沙窝乡)

Other areas:

- Ezhou Economic Development Zone (鄂州经济开发区)

=== Huarong District ===
Three towns:

- Huarong (华容镇), Miaoling (庙岭镇), Duandian (段店镇)

Two townships:

- Linjiang (临江乡), Putuan (蒲团乡)

=== Liangzihu District ===
Five towns:

- Taihe (太和镇), Donggou (东沟镇), Liangzi Wildlife Management Area (梁子镇/梁子生态管理区), Tujianao (涂家垴镇), Zhaoshan (沼山镇)

== Huanggang ==
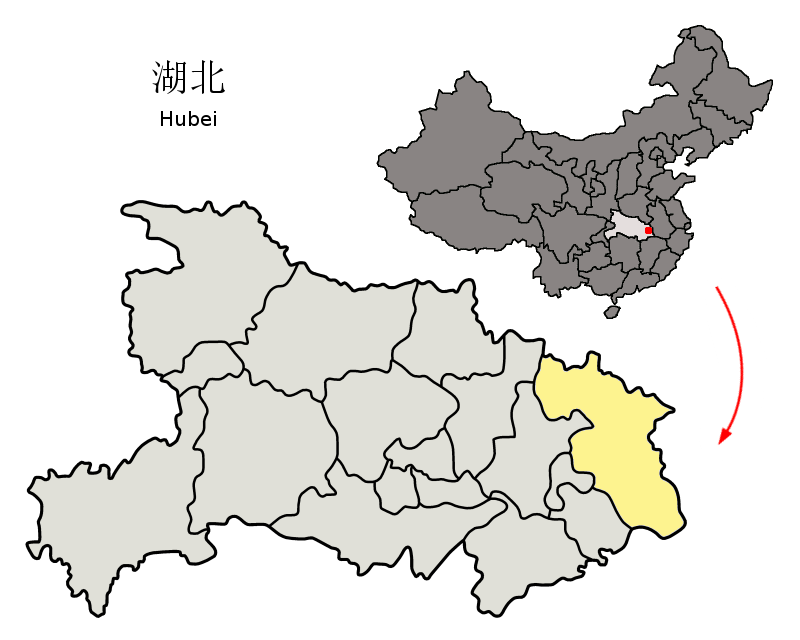
Location of Huanggang in the province

=== Huangzhou District ===
Four subdistricts:

- Chibi Subdistrict (赤壁街道), Donghu Subdistrict (东湖街道), Yuwang Subdistrict (禹王街道), Nanhu Subdistrict (南湖街道)

Three towns:

- Lukou (路口镇), Ducheng (堵城镇), Chencelou (陈策楼镇)

The only township is Taodian Township (陶店乡).

One other area:

- Railway Station Economic Development Area (火车站经济开发区)

=== Macheng ===
Subdistricts:

- Longchiqoao Subdistrict (龙池桥街道), Gulou Subdistrict (鼓楼街道), Nanhu Subdistrict (南湖街道)

Towns:

- Zhongguanyi (中馆驿镇), Songbu (宋埠镇), Qiting (歧亭镇), Baiguo (白果镇), Fuzihe (夫子河镇), Yanjiahe (阎家河镇), Guishan (龟山镇), Yantianhe (盐田河镇), Zhangjiafan (张家畈镇), Muzidian (木子店镇), Sanhekou (三河口镇), Huangtugang (黄土岗镇), Futianhe (福田河镇), C/Shengmagang (乘马岗镇), Shunhe (顺河镇)

The only township is Tiemengang (铁门岗乡).

One other area: Macheng Economic Development Zone (麻城经济开发区)

=== Wuxue ===
Four subdistricts:

- Wuxue Subdistrict (武穴街道), Kanjiang Subdistrict (刊江街道), Tianjiazhen Subdistrict (Tianzhen) (田家镇街道), Wanzhanghu Subdistrict (万丈湖街道)

Eight towns:

- Meichuan (梅川镇), Yuchuan (余川镇), Huaqiao (花桥镇), Dajin (大金镇), Shifosi (石佛寺镇), Siwang (四望镇), Dafasi (大法寺镇), Longping (龙坪镇)

=== Hong'an County ===
Towns:

- Chengguan (城关镇), Qiliping (七里坪镇), Huajiahe (华家河镇), Ercheng (二程镇), Shangxinji (上新集镇), Gaoqiao (高桥镇), Mi'ersi (觅儿寺镇), Baliwan (八里湾镇), Taipingqiao (太平桥镇), Yongjiahe (永佳河镇)

The only township is Xinghua Township (杏花乡)

Other Areas: Huolianfan Tea Farm (火连畈茶场), Tiantaishan Scenic Area (天台山风景区管理处)

=== Huangmei County ===
Twelve towns:

- Huangmei (黄梅镇), Konglong (孔垄镇), Xiaochi (小池镇), Xiaxin (下新镇), Dahe (大河镇), Tingqian (停前镇), Wuzu (五祖镇), Zhuogang (濯港镇), Caishan (蔡山镇), Xinkai (新开镇), Dushan (独山镇), Fenlu (分路镇)

Four townships:

- Liulin Township (柳林乡), Shamu Township (杉木乡), Kuzhu Township (苦竹乡), Liuzuo Township (刘佐乡)

=== Luotian County ===
Ten towns:

- Fengshan (凤山镇), Luotuo'ao (骆驼坳镇), Dahe'an (大河岸镇), Jiuzihe (九资河镇), Shengli (胜利镇), Hepu (河铺镇), Sanlifan (三里畈镇), Kuanghe (匡河镇) (formerly a township 乡), Baimiaohe (白庙河镇) (formerly a township 乡), Daqi (大崎镇) (formerly a township 乡)

Two townships:

- Bailianhe Township (白莲河乡), Pinghu Township (平湖乡)

=== Qichun County ===
Thirteen towns:

- Caohe (漕河镇), Chidong (赤东镇), Qizhou (蕲州镇), Guanyao (管窑镇), Pengsi (彭思镇), Hengche (横车镇), Zhulin (株林镇), Liuhe (刘河镇), Shizi (狮子镇), Qingshi (青石镇), Zhangbang (张塝镇), Datong (大同镇), Tanlin (檀林镇)

The only township is Xiangqiao Township (向桥乡)

One other area: Balihu (八里湖)

=== Tuanfeng County ===
Eight towns:

- Tuanfeng (团风镇), Linshanhe (淋山河镇), Fanggaoping (方高坪镇), Huilongshan (回龙山镇), Macaomiao (马曹庙镇), Shangbahe (上巴河镇), Zongluzui (总路咀镇), Dandian (但店镇)

Two townships:

- Gu/Jiamiao Township (贾庙乡), Dupi Township (杜皮乡)

=== Xishui County ===
Twelve towns:

- Qingquan (清泉镇), Bahe (巴河镇), Zhuwa (竹瓦镇), Wanggang (汪岗镇), Tuanpi (团陂镇), Guankou (关口镇), Bailian (白莲镇), Caihe (蔡河镇), Xianma (洗马镇), Dingsidang (丁司垱镇), Sanhua (散花镇), Lanxi (兰溪镇)

The only township is Lüyang Township (绿杨乡)

Three other areas: Sanjiaoshan Forestry Area (三角山林场), Cehu Breeding Farm (策湖养殖场), Xishui Economic Development Zone (经济开发区)

=== Yingshan County ===
Eight towns:

- Wenquan (温泉镇), Nanhe (南河镇), Hongshan (红山镇), Jinjiapu (金家铺镇), Shitouju (石头咀镇), Caopandi (草盘地镇), Leijiadian (雷家店镇), Yangliuwan (杨柳湾镇)

Three townships:

- Fangjiaju Township (方家咀乡), Kongjiafang Township (孔家坊乡), Taojiahe Township (陶家河乡)

Four other areas:

- Taohuachong Forestry Area (桃花冲林场), Wujiashan Forestry Area (吴家山林场), Wufengshan Forestry Area (五峰山林场), Yingshan County Economic Development District (英山县经济开发区)

== Huangshi ==
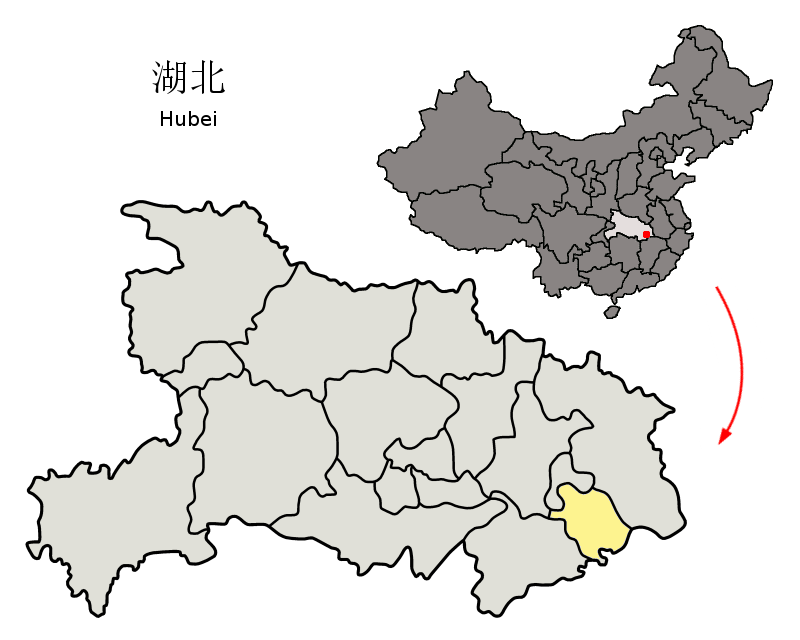
Location of Huangshi in the province

=== Huangshigang District ===
Subdistricts:

- Shenjiaying Subdistrict (沈家营街道), Huangshigang Subdistrict (黄石港街道), Hongqiqiao Subdistrict (红旗桥街道), Shengyanggang Subdistrict (胜阳港街道), Huahu Subdistrict (花湖街道)

=== Tieshan District ===
The only administrative direct subdivision is a town-simulating village (区直辖村模拟镇).

=== Xialu District ===
The only subdistrict is Tuanchengshan Subdistrict (团城山街道)

=== Xisaishan District ===
Former Subdistricts:

- Linjiang Subdistrict (临江街道), Baquan Subdistrict (八泉街道), Chenjiawan Subdistrict (陈家湾街道), Chengyue Subdistrict (澄月街道), Huangsiwan Subdistrict (黄思湾街道), Xisaishan Subdistrict (西塞山街道)

The only town is Hekou (河口镇)

=== Daye ===
Subdistricts:

- Dongyue Road Subdistrict (东岳路街道), 东风路街道, Jinhu Subdistrict (金湖街道), Luojiaqiao Subdistrict (罗家桥街道), Jinshan Subdistrict (金山街道)

Towns:

- Jinniu (金牛镇), Bao'an (保安镇), Lingxiang (灵乡镇), Jinshandian (金山店镇), Haidiqiao (还地桥镇), Yinzu (殷祖镇), Liurenba (刘仁八镇), Chengui (陈贵镇), Dajipu (大箕铺镇), Wangren (汪仁镇)

The only township is Mingshan Township (茗山乡)

Other areas: 东风农场管理区, 四顾闸管理处

=== Yangxin County ===
Township-level divisions:

- Xingguo (兴国镇), Fuchi (富池镇), Huangsangkou (黄颡口镇), Weiyuankou (𣲗源口镇 (韦源口镇)), Taizi (太子镇), Dawang (大王镇), Taogang (陶港镇), Baisha (白沙镇), Futu (浮屠镇), Sanxi (三溪镇), Yanggang (洋港镇), Paishi (排市镇), Mugang (木港镇), Fenglin (枫林镇), Wangying (王英镇)

== Jingmen ==
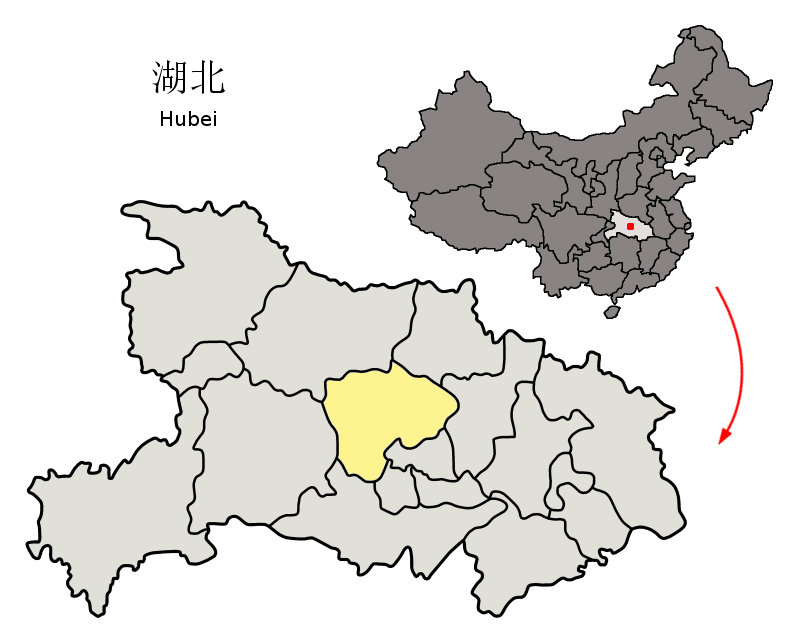
Location of Jingmen in the province

=== Dongbao District ===
Two subdistricts:

- Longquan Subdistrict (龙泉街道), Quankou Subdistrict (泉口街道)

Six towns:

- Lixi (栗溪镇), Ziling (子陵镇), Zhanghe (漳河镇), Mahe (马河镇), Shiqiaoyi (石桥驿镇), Pailou (牌楼镇)

The only township is Xianju Township (仙居乡)

=== Duodao District ===
Four subdistricts:

- Duodao Subdistrict (掇刀街道), Baimiao Subdistrict (白庙街道), Xinglong Subdistrict (兴隆街道), Shuangxi Subdistrict (双喜街道)

Two towns:

- Tuanlinpu (团林铺镇), Macheng (麻城镇)

=== Zhongxiang ===
The only subdistrict is Yingzhong Subdistrict (郢中街道)

Towns:

- Yangzi (洋梓镇), Changshou (长寿镇), Fengle (丰乐镇), Huji (胡集镇), Shuanghe (双河镇), Linkuang (磷矿镇), Wenji (文集镇), Lengshui (冷水镇), Shipai (石牌镇), Jiukou (旧口镇), Chaihu (柴湖镇), Changtan (长滩镇), Dongqiao (东桥镇), Kedian (客店镇), Zhangji (张集镇)

The only township is Jiuli Township (九里乡)

=== Jingshan County ===
Towns:

- Xinshi (新市镇), Yongxing (永兴镇), Caowu (曹武镇), Luodian (罗店镇), Songhe (宋河镇), Pingba (坪坝镇), Sanyang (三阳镇), Lülin (绿林镇), Yangji (杨集镇), Sunqiao (孙桥镇), Shilong (石龙镇), Yonglong (永漋镇), Yanmenkou (雁门口镇), Qianchang (钱场镇)

=== Shayang County ===
Towns:

- Shayang Town (沙洋镇), Wulipu (五里铺镇), Shilipu (十里铺镇), Jishan (纪山镇), Shihuiqiao (拾迴桥镇/拾回桥镇), Hougang (后港镇), Maoli (毛李镇), Guandang (官垱镇/官当镇), Lishi (李市镇), Maliang (马良镇), Gaoyang (高阳镇), Shenji (沈集镇), Zengji (曾集镇)

Other Areas:

- Binjiang New Area (滨江新区), Xingang Qu (新港区), Shayang Economic Development District (沙洋经济开发区), Shayang Prison Management (沙洋监狱管理局)

== Jingzhou ==
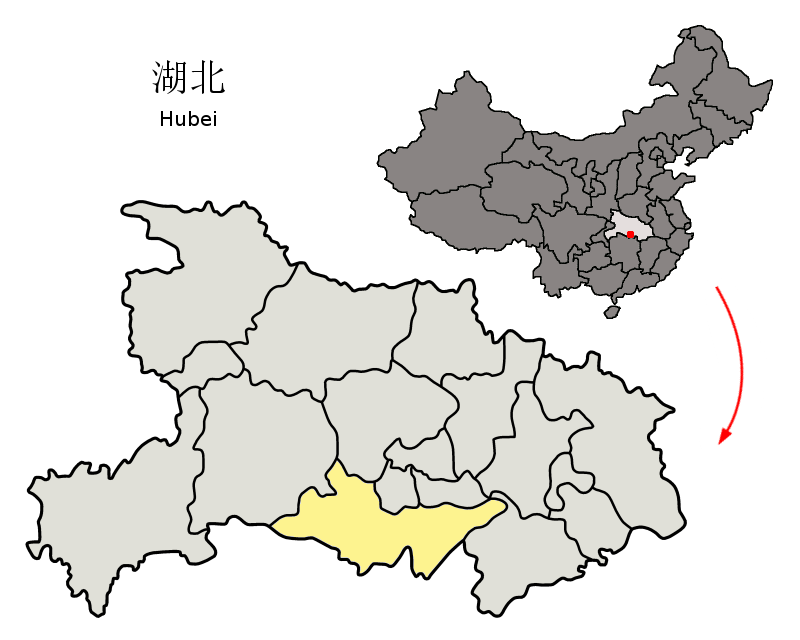
Location of Jingzhou in the province

=== Jingzhou District ===
Three subdistricts:

- Xicheng Subdistrict (西城街道), Dongcheng Subdistrict (东城街道), Chengnan Subdistrict (城南街道)

Seven towns:

- Jinan (纪南镇), Chuandian (川店镇), Mashan (马山镇), Balingshan (八岭山镇), Libu (李埠镇), Mishi (弥市镇), Yingcheng (郢城镇)

Two other areas:

- Taihugang (太湖港农场管理区), Lingjiaohu (菱角湖农场管理区)

=== Shashi District ===
Five subdistricts:

- Zhongshan Subdistrict (中山路街道/中山街道), Chongwen Subdistrict (崇文街街道/崇文街道), Jiefang Subdistrict (解放路街道/解放街道), Shengli Subdistrict (胜利街街道/胜利街道), Chaoyang Subdistrict (朝阳路街道/朝阳街道) (formerly: Lianhe Subdistrict (联合街道))

Four towns:

- Luochang (锣场镇), Cenhe (岑河镇), Guanyindang (观音垱镇), Guanju (关沮镇)

The only township is Lixin Township (立新乡)

=== Honghu ===
Two subdistricts:

- Xindi Subdistrict (新堤街道), Binhu Subdistrict (滨湖街道)

Fourteen towns:

- Luoshan (螺山镇), Wulin (乌林镇), Longkou (龙口镇), Yanwo (燕窝镇), Xintan (新滩镇), Fengkou (峰口镇), Caoshi (曹市镇), Fuchang (府场镇), Daijiachang (戴家场镇), Qujiawan (瞿家湾镇), Shakou (沙口镇), Wanquan (万全镇), Chahe (汊河镇), Huangjiakou (黄家口镇)

The only township is Laowan Township (老湾乡)

Three administrative zones:

- Xiaogang (小港管理区), Datonghu (大同湖管理区), Dashahu (大沙湖管理区)

=== Shishou ===
Two subdistricts:

- Xiulin Subdistrict (绣林街道), Biheshan Subdistrict (笔架山街道)

Eleven towns:

- Xinchang (新厂镇), Henggoushi (横沟市镇), Dayuan (大垸镇), Xiaohekou (小河口镇), Taohuashan (桃花山镇), Tiaoguan (调关镇), Dongsheng (东升镇), Gaojimiao (高基庙镇), Nankou (南口镇), Gaoling (高陵镇), Tuanshansi (团山寺镇)

The only township is Jiuheyuan Township (久合垸乡)

The only economic and technological development zone is Tian'ezhou (天鹅洲)

=== Songzi ===
Towns:

- Xinjiangkou (新江口镇), Nanhai (南海镇), Babao (八宝镇), Yuanshi (宛市镇), Laocheng (老城镇), Chendian (陈店镇), Wangjiaqiao (王家桥镇), Sijiachang (斯家场镇), Yanglinshi (杨林市镇), Zhichanghe (纸厂河镇), Jieheshi (街河市镇), Weishui (危水镇), Liujiachang (刘家场镇), Shadaoguan (沙道观镇)

Townships:

- Wanjia Township (万家乡), Xiejiaping Tujia Ethnic Township (卸甲坪土家族乡)

=== Gong'an County ===
Fourteen towns:

- Buhe (埠河镇), Douhudi (斗湖堤镇), Jiazhuyuan (夹竹园镇), Zhakou (闸口镇), Yangjiachang (杨家厂镇), Mahaokou (麻豪口镇), Ouchi (藕池镇), Huangshantou (黄山头镇), Mengjiaxi (孟家溪镇), Nanping (南平镇), Zhangzhuangpu (章庄铺镇), Shizikou (狮子口镇), Banzhudang (斑竹垱镇), Maojiagang (毛家港镇)

Two townships:

- Ganjiachang Township (甘家厂乡), Zhangtiansi Township (章田寺乡)

=== Jiangling County ===
Six towns:

- Zishi (资市镇), Xionghe (熊河镇), Baimasi (白马寺镇), Shagang (沙岗镇), Puji (普济镇), Haoxue (郝穴镇)

Two townships:

- Majiazhai Township (马家寨乡), Qinshi Township (秦市乡)

Three other areas:

- Jiangbei (江北监狱), Sanhu (三湖农场), Lu/Liuheyuan (六合垸农场)

=== Jianli County ===
Eighteen towns:

- Rongcheng (容城镇), Zhuhe (朱河镇), Xingou (新沟镇), Gongchang (龚场镇), Zhoulaozui (周老嘴镇), Huangxiekou (黄歇口镇), Wangqiao (汪桥镇), Chengji (程集镇), Fenyan (分盐镇), Maoshi (毛市镇), Futiansi (福田寺镇), Shangchewan (上车湾镇), Bianhe (汴河镇), Chiba (尺八镇), Bailuo (白螺镇), Wangshi (网市镇), Sanzhou (三洲镇), Qiaoshi (桥市镇)

Three townships:

- Hongcheng Township (红城乡), Qipan Township (棋盘乡), Zhemu Township (柘木乡)

Two other areas:

- Dayuan (大垸农场), Huanghu (荒湖农场)

== Qianjiang ==
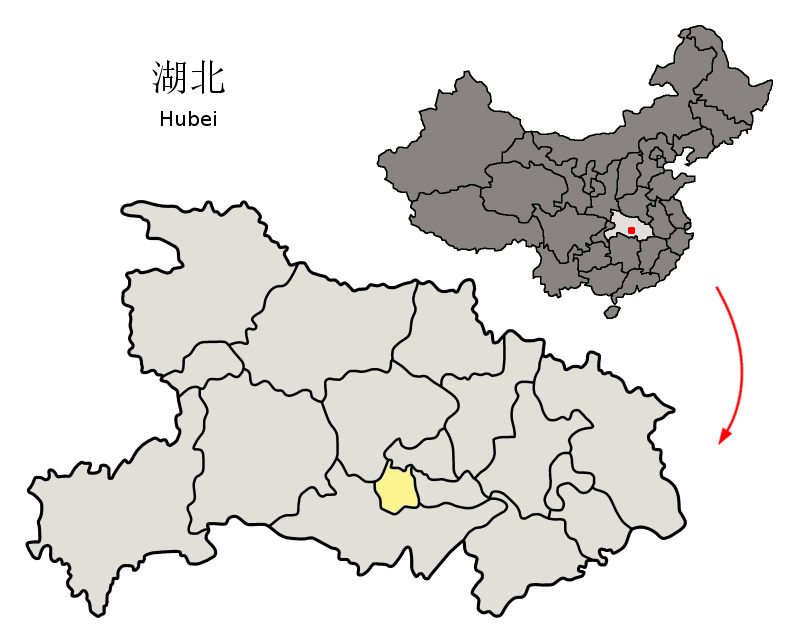
Location of Qianjiang in the province

Six subdistricts:

- Yuanlin Subdistrict (园林街道), Yangshi Subdistrict (杨市街道), Zhouji Subdistrict (周矶街道), Guanghua Subdistrict (广华街道), Taifeng Subdistrict (泰丰街道), Gaochang Subdistrict (高场街道)

Ten towns:

- Zhugentan (竹根滩镇), Yuyang (渔洋镇), Wangchang (王场镇), Gaoshibei (高石碑镇), Xiongkou (熊口镇), Laoxin (老新镇), Haokou (浩口镇), Jiyukou (积玉口镇), Zhangjin (张金镇), Longwan (龙湾镇)

Other areas:

- Qianjiang Development Zone/Zekou Subdistrict (潜江开发区/泽口街道), Bailuhu Administrative Area (白鹭湖管理区), Zongkou Administrative Area (总口管理区), Xiongkou Farm Administrative Area (熊口农场管理区), Yunlianghu Administrative Area (运粮湖管理区), Houhu Administrative Area (后湖管理区), Zhouji Administrative Area (周矶管理区), Jianghan Oil Administrative Area (江汉石油管理局)

== Shennongjia ==
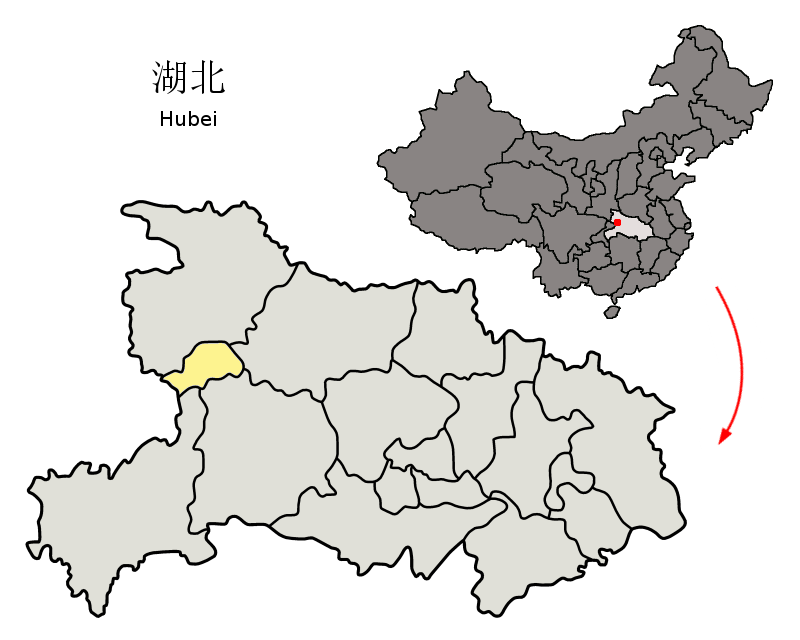
Location of Shennongjia in the province

Six towns:

- Songbai (松柏镇), Yangri (阳日镇), Muyu (木鱼镇), Hongping (红坪镇), Xinhua (新华镇), Jiuhu (九湖镇)

Two townships:

- Songluo Township (宋洛乡), Xiaguping Tujia Ethnic Township (下谷坪土家族乡)

== Shiyan ==
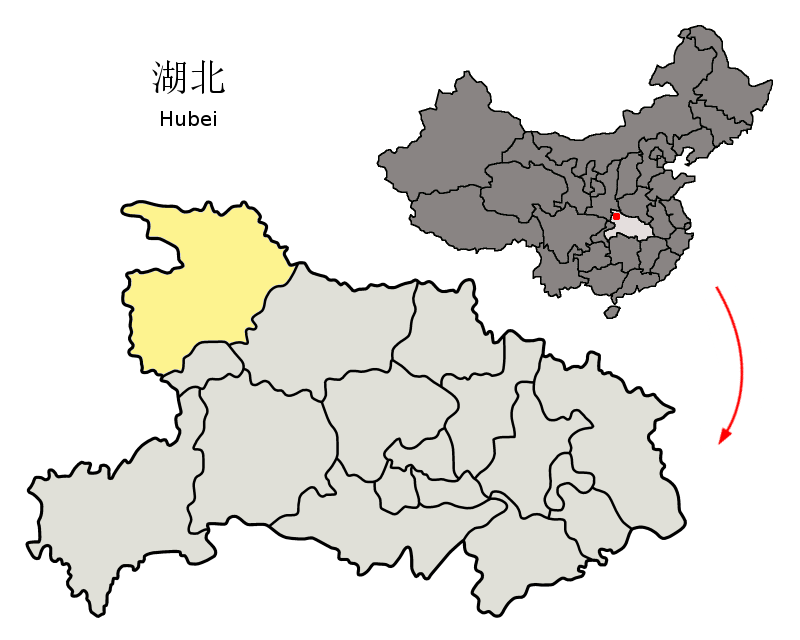
Location of Shiyan in the province

=== Maojian District ===
Subdistricts:

- Wudang Road Subdistrict (武当路街道), Eryan Subdistrict (二堰街道), Wuyan Subdistrict (五堰街道), Bailang Subdistrict (白浪街道)

The only town is Dachuan (大川镇)

Townships:

- Xiaochuan Township (小川乡), Maota Township (茅塔乡), Yuanyang Township (鸳鸯乡)

=== Zhangwan District ===
Four subdistricts:

- Huaguo Subdistrict (花果街道), Hongwei Subdistrict (红卫街道), Checheng Road Subdistrict (车城路街道), Hanjiang Road Subdistrict (汉江路街道)

Two towns:

- Huanglong (黄龙镇), Bailin (柏林镇)

Two townships:

- Fangtan Township (方滩乡), Xigou Township (西沟乡)

Four other areas:

- Xicheng Economic Development Area (西城经济开发区), Shiyan Industrial New Area (十堰工业新区), Qinjiaping Forestry Area (秦家坪林场, Fenghuangshan Tea Farm (凤凰山茶场)

=== Danjiangkou ===
Subdistricts:

- Junzhou Road Subdistrict (均州路街道), Daba Road/Daba Subdistrict (大坝路街道/大坝街道), Danzhao Road Subdistrict (丹赵路街道), Sanguandian Subdistrict (三官殿街道)

Towns:

- Tuguanya (土关垭镇), Langhe (浪河镇), Dingjiaying (丁家营镇), Liuliping (六里坪镇), Yanchihe (盐池河镇), Junxian (均县镇), Xijiadian (习家店镇), Haoping (蒿坪镇), Shigu (石鼓镇), Liangshuihe (凉水河镇), Guanshan (官山镇), Longshan (龙山镇)

Other areas:

- Wudangshan Tourism Economic Special Area (武当山旅游经济特区), Xingang Economic Development Management Area (新港经济开发管理处), Niuhe Forestry Development Management Area (牛河林业开发管理区), Baiyangping Forestry Development Management Area (白杨坪林业开发管理区), Dagou Forestry Development Management Area (大沟林业开发管理区)

=== Fang County ===
Towns:

- Chengguan (城关镇), Jundian (军店镇), Hualongyan (化龙堰镇), Tucheng (土城镇), Damuchang (大木厂镇), Qingfeng (青峰镇), Mengusi (门古寺镇), Baihe (白鹤镇), Yerengu (野人谷镇), Hongta (红塔镇), Yaohuai (窑淮镇), Yinjifu (尹吉甫镇)

Townships:

- Yaoping Township (姚坪乡), Shahe Township (沙河乡), Wanyuhe Township (万峪河乡), Shangkan Township (上龛乡), Zhongba Township (中坝乡), Jiudao Township (九道乡), Huilong Township (回龙乡), Wutai Township (五台乡)

=== Yunyang District ===
Towns:

- Chengguan (城关镇), Anyang (安阳镇), Yangxipu (杨溪铺镇), Qingqu (青曲镇), Baisangguan (白桑关镇), Nanhuatang (南化塘镇), Bailang (白浪镇), Liudong (刘洞镇), Tanshan (谭山镇), Meipu (梅铺镇), Qingshan (青山镇), Chadian (茶店镇) (Economic Development Zone), Liubei (柳陂镇), Baoxia (鲍峡镇), Hujiaying (胡家营镇), Tanjiawan (谭家湾镇)

Townships:

- Daliu Township (大柳乡), Wufeng Township (五峰乡), Yeda Township (叶大乡)

Other area:

- Hongyanbei Forestry Area (红岩背林场)

=== Yunxi County ===
Nine towns:

- Chengguan (城关镇), Tumen (土门镇), Shangjin (上津镇), Dianzi (店子镇), Jiahe (夹河镇), Yangyi (羊尾镇), Guanyin (观音镇), Ma'an (马安镇, formerly 马鞍镇), Hejia (河夹镇)

Seven townships:

- Xiangkou Township (香口乡), Guanfang Township (关防乡), Hubeikou Hui Ethnic Township (湖北口回族乡), Jingyang Township (景阳乡), Liulang Township (六郎乡), Jianchi Township (涧池乡), Anjia Township (安家乡)

Two other areas:

- Huaishulin (槐树林特场), Sanguandong Protected Natural Forest Area (三官洞天然林保护区)

=== Zhushan County ===
Nine towns:

- Chengguan (城关镇), Yishui (溢水镇), Majiadu (麻家渡镇), Baofeng (宝丰镇), Leigu (擂鼓镇), Qingu (秦古镇), Desheng (得胜镇), Shangyong (上庸镇), Guandu (官渡镇)

Eight townships:

- Pankou Township (潘口乡), Zhuping Township (竹坪乡), Damiao Township (大庙乡), Shuangtai Township (双台乡), Loutai Township (楼台乡), Wenfeng Township (文峰乡), Shenhe Township (深河乡), Liulin Township (柳林乡)

=== Zhuxi County ===
Eleven towns:

- Chengguan (城关镇), Jiangjiayan (蒋家堰镇), Zhongfeng (中峰镇), Shuiping (水坪镇), Xianhe (县河镇), Quanxi (泉溪镇), Fengxi (丰溪镇), Longba (龙坝镇), Bingying (兵营镇), Huiwan (汇湾镇), Xinzhou (新洲镇)

Four townships:

- Eping Township (鄂坪乡), Tianbao Township (天宝乡), Taoyuan Township (桃源乡), Xiangba Township (向坝乡)

Other areas:

- Longwangya Tea Farm (龙王垭茶场), Zhuxi County Comprehensive Farm (国营竹溪综合农场), Stock Seed Farm (原种场), Fish Stock Farm (渔种场), Wangjiashan Tea Farm (王家山茶场), Biaohu Forestry Area (标湖林场), Shuangzhu Forestry Area (双竹林场), Baguashan Forestry Area (八卦山林场), Yuanmao Forestry Area (源茂林场), Daiwanggou Forestry Area (岱王沟林场), Wangfuzuo Forestry Area (望府座林场), Tianchiya Forestry Area (天池垭林场), Jiuligang Forestry Area (九里岗林场), Shibali Canyon Management Bureau (十八里长峡管理局)

== Suizhou ==
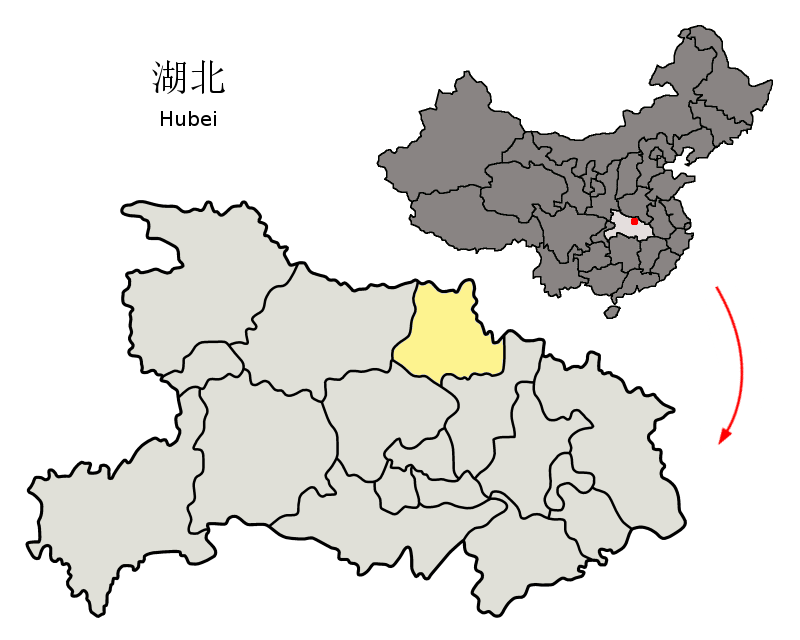
Location of Suizhou in the province

=== Zengdu District ===
Four subdistricts:

- Xicheng Subdistrict (西城街道), Dongcheng Subdistrict (东城街道), Nanjiao Subdistrict (南郊街道), Beijiao Subdistrict (北郊街道)

Five towns:

- Wandian (万店镇), Hedian (何店镇), Luoyang (洛阳镇), Fuhe (府河镇), Xihe (淅河镇)

Other areas:

- Chengnan New Area (城南新区管委会), Zengdu District New Industry Base (曾都区新型工业基地), Suizhou City Economic Development Zone (随州市经济开发区), Suizhou Tiedong New Area (随州铁东新区管委会), Zengdu District Economic Development Zone (曾都区经济开发区)

=== Guangshui ===
Four subdistricts:

- Yingshan Subdistrict (应山街道), Shili Subdistrict (十里街道), Guangshui Subdistrict (广水街道), Chengjiao Subdistrict (城郊街道)

Thirteen towns:

- Wushengguan (武胜关镇), Yangzhai (杨寨镇), Chenxiang (陈巷镇), Changling (长岭镇), Maping (马坪镇), Guanmiao (关庙镇), Yudian (余店镇), Wudian (吴店镇), Haodian (郝店镇), Caihe (蔡河镇), Lidian (李店镇), Taiping (太平镇), Luodian (骆店镇)

Other areas:

- Zhonghuashan Forestry Area (中华山林场), Santan Scenic Area (三潭风景区), Province-level Economic Development Area (省级经济技术开发区)

=== Sui County ===
Nineteen towns:

- Lishan (厉山镇), Gaocheng (高城镇), Yindian (殷店镇), Caodian (草店镇), Xiaolin (小林镇), Huaihe (淮河镇), Wanhe (万和镇), Shangshi (尚市镇), Tangxian (唐县镇), Wushan (吴山镇), Xinjie (新街镇), Anju (安居镇), Huantan (澴潭镇) (sometimes written as 环潭镇), Hongshan (洪山镇), Changgang (长岗镇), Sanligang (三里岗镇), Liulin (柳林镇), Junchuan (均川镇), Wanfudian (万福店镇) (formerly Wanfu (万福镇))

== Tianmen ==
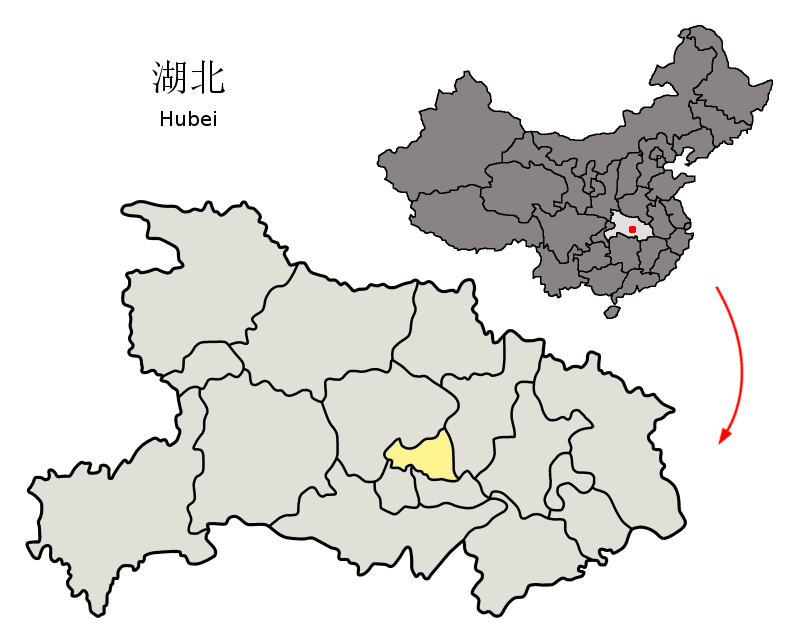
Location of Tianmen in the province

Subdistricts:

- Jingling Subdistrict (竟陵街道), Qiaoxiang Subdistrict Development Zone (侨乡街道开发区), Yanglin Subdistrict (杨林街道)

Towns:

- Duobao (多宝镇), Tuoshi (拖市镇), Zhanggang (张港镇), Jiangchang (蒋场镇), Wangchang (汪场镇), Yuxin (渔薪镇), Huangtan (黄潭镇), Yuekou (岳口镇), Henglin (横林镇), Pengshi (彭市镇), Mayang (麻洋镇), Duoxiang (多祥镇), Ganyi (干驿镇), Mawan (马湾镇), Lushi (卢市镇), Xiaoban (小板镇), Jiuzhen (九真镇), Zaoshi (皂市镇), Hushi (胡市镇), Shijiahe (石家河镇), Fozishan (佛子山镇)

The only township is Jingtan Township (净潭乡)

Other Areas:

- Tianmen Industrial Park (天门工业园), Jianghu Farm (蒋湖农场), Baimaohu Farm (白茅湖农场), Chenhu Committee (沉湖管委会)

== Xiangyang ==
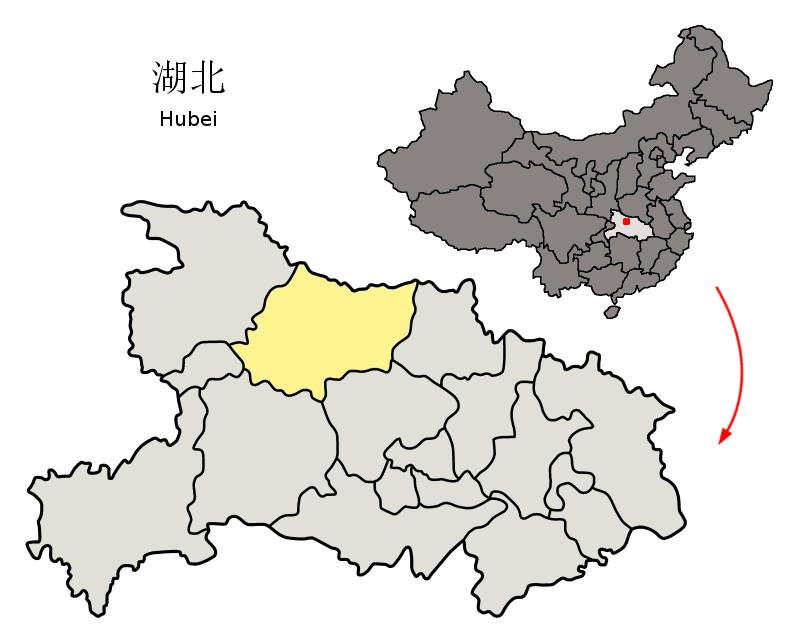
Location of Xiangyang in the province

=== Fancheng District ===
Subdistricts:

- Hanjiang Subdistrict (汉江街道), Wangzhai Subdistrict (王寨街道), Zhongyuan Subdistrict (中原街道), Dingzhongmen Subdistrict (定中门街道), Qinghekou Subdistrict (清河口街道), Pingxiangmen Subdistrict (屏襄门街道), Migong Subdistrict (米公街道), Shipu Subdistrict (柿铺街道), Zizhen Subdistrict (紫贞街道), Qilihe Subdistrict (七里河街道), Dongfeng Subdistrict (东风街道)

Towns:

- Niushou (牛首镇), Taipingdian (太平店镇), Tuanshan (团山镇), Mizhuang (米庄镇)

=== Xiangcheng District ===
Six subdistricts:

- Zhenwushan Subdistrict (真武山街道), Gucheng Subdistrict (古城街道), Panggong Subdistrict (庞公街道), Tanxi Subdistrict (檀溪街道), Longzhong Subdistrict (隆中街道), Yujiahu Subdistrict (余家湖街道)

Two towns:

- Oumiao (欧庙镇), Wolong (卧龙镇)

The only township is Yinji Township (尹集乡)

=== Xiangzhou District ===
Subdistricts:

- Zhangwan Subdistrict (张湾街道), Liuji Subdistrict (刘集街道), Xiaowan Subdistrict (肖湾街道), Liulianghe Subdistrict (六两河街道)

Towns:

- Longwang (龙王镇), Shiqiao (石桥镇), Huangji (黄集镇), Huopai (伙牌镇), Guyi (古驿镇), Zhuji (朱集镇), Chenghe (程河镇), Shuanggou (双沟镇), Zhangjiaji (张家集镇), Huanglong (黄龙镇), Yushan (峪山镇), Dongjin (东津镇), Mizhuang (米庄镇)

=== Laohekou ===
Two subdistricts:

- Guanghua Subdistrict (光化街道), Zanyang Subdistrict (酂阳街道)

Seven towns:

- Menglou (孟楼镇), Zhulinqiao (竹林桥镇), Xueji (薛集镇), Zhangji (张集镇), Xianrendu (仙人渡镇), Hongshanzui (洪山嘴镇), Lilou (李楼镇)

The only township is Yuanchong Township (袁冲乡)

Other areas:

- Shucai Seed Stock Station (蔬菜原种场), Baihuashan Forestry Area (百花山林场), Linmaoshan Forestry Area (林茂山林场), Erfangying Seed Stock Station (二房营原种场)

=== Yicheng ===
Two subdistricts:

- Yancheng Subdistrict (鄢城街道), Nanying Subdistrict (南营街道)

Eight towns:

- Zhengji (郑集镇), Xiaohe (小河镇), Liuhou (刘猴镇), Kongwan (孔湾镇), Liushui (流水镇), Banqiao (板桥镇, or Banqiaodian 板桥店镇), Wangji (王集镇), Leihe (雷河镇)

Three other areas:

- Yicheng Economic Development Zone (宜城经济开发区), Dayan Industrial Park (大雁工业园区), Re-education Through Labor camp (劳教所)

=== Zaoyang ===
Three subdistricts:

- Beicheng Subdistrict (北城街道), Nancheng Subdistrict (南城街道), Huancheng Subdistrict (环城街道)

Twelve towns:

- Juwan (琚湾镇), Qifang (七方镇), Yangdang (杨垱镇), Taiping (太平镇), Xinshi (新市镇), Lutou (鹿头镇), Liusheng (刘升镇), Xinglong (兴隆镇), Wangcheng (王城镇), Wudian (吴店镇), Xiongji (熊集镇), Pinglin (平林镇)

Other areas:

- Zaoyang Economic Zone (枣阳经济开发区), Suiyang (随阳农场), Chehe (车河农场)

=== Baokang County ===
Ten towns:

- Chengguan (城关镇), Huangbao (黄堡镇), Houping (后坪镇), Longping (龙坪镇), Dianya (店垭镇), Maliang (马良镇), Xiema (歇马镇), Maqiao (马桥镇), Siping (寺坪镇), Guoduwan (过渡湾镇)

The only township is Liangyu Township (两峪乡)

=== Gucheng County ===
Nine towns:

- Chengguan (城关镇), Shihua (石花镇), Shengkang (盛𡐓镇/盛康镇), Miaotan (庙滩镇), Wushan (五山镇), Cihe (茨河镇), Nanhe (南河镇), Zijin (紫金镇), Lengji (冷集镇)

The only township is Zhaowan Township (赵湾乡)

Other areas:

- Xieshan Forestry Area (薤山林场)

=== Nanzhang County ===
Ten towns:

- Chengguan, Wu'an, Jiuji, Limiao, Changping, Xueping, Banqiao, Xunjian, Donggong, and Xiaoyan

One other area:

- Qinghe

== Xianning ==
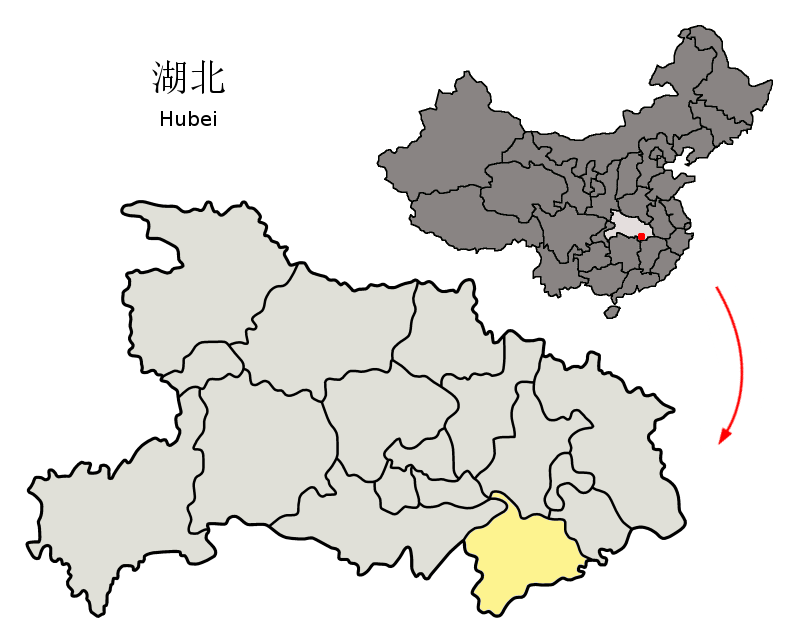
Location of Xianning in the province

=== Xian'an District ===
Subdistricts:

- Wenquan Subdistrict (温泉街道), Fushan Subdistrict (浮山街道), Yong'an Subdistrict (永安街道)

Towns:

- Tingsiqiao (汀泗桥镇), Xiangyanghu (向阳湖镇), Guanbuqiao (官埠桥镇), Heshengqiao (贺胜桥镇), Shuangxiqiao (双溪桥镇), Maqiao (马桥镇), Guihua (桂花镇), Gaoqiao (高桥镇)

The only township is Damu Township (大幕乡)

Other Area: Xiangyanghu Dairy Farm (向阳湖奶牛良种场)

=== Xianning Advanced Technology Industry Area ===
- Henggouqiao (横沟桥镇)

=== Chibi City ===
Three subdistricts:

- Puqi Subdistrict (蒲圻街道), Chimagang Subdistrict (赤马港街道), Lushuihu Subdistrict (陆水湖街道)

Ten towns:

- Xindian (新店镇), Zhaoliqiao (赵李桥镇), Cha'anling (茶庵岭镇), Chebu (车埠镇), Chibi Town (赤壁镇) (or 周郎嘴回族镇), Liushanhu (柳山湖镇), Shenshan (神山镇), Zhonghuopu (中伙铺镇), Guantangyi (官塘驿镇), Huanggaihu (黄盖湖镇)

The only township is Yujiaqiao Township (余家桥乡)

Other areas:

- (蒲纺工业园) (官塘驿林场) (羊楼洞茶场) (沧湖开发区) (赤壁市经济开发区)

=== Chongyang County ===
Eight towns:

- Tiancheng (天城镇), Shaping (沙坪镇), Shicheng (石城镇), Guihuaquan (桂花泉镇), Baini (白霓镇), Lukou (路口镇), Jintang (金塘镇), Qingshan (青山镇)

Four townships:

- Xiaoling Township (肖岭乡), Tongzhong Township (铜钟乡), Gangkou Township (港口乡), Gaojian Township (高枧乡)

One other area:

- Chongyang County Industrial Park District (崇阳县工业园区)

=== Jiayu County ===
Towns:

- Luxi (陆溪镇), Gaotieling (高铁岭镇), Guanqiao (官桥镇), Yuyue (鱼岳镇), Xinjie (新街镇), Dupu (渡普镇), Panjiawan (潘家湾镇), Paizhouwan (牌洲湾镇)

=== Tongcheng County ===
Nine towns:

- Junshui (隽水镇), Maishi (麦市镇), Tanghu (塘湖镇), Guandao (关刀镇), Shadui (沙堆镇), Wuli (五里镇), Shinan (石南镇), Beigang (北港镇), Magang (马港镇)

Two townships:

- Sizhuang Township (四庄乡), Daping Township (大坪乡)

=== Tongshan County ===
Eight towns:

- Tongyang (通羊镇), Nanlinqiao (南林桥镇), Huangshapu (黄沙铺镇), Xiapu (厦铺镇), Jiugongshan (九宫山镇), Chuangwang (闯王镇), Honggang (洪港镇), Dafan (大畈镇)

Four townships:

- Dalu Township (大路乡), Yangfanglin Township (杨芳林乡), Yanxia Township (燕厦乡), Cikou Township (慈口乡)

One other area:

- Jiugongshan Tourism District Management Committee (九宫山名胜风景区管委会)

== Xiantao ==
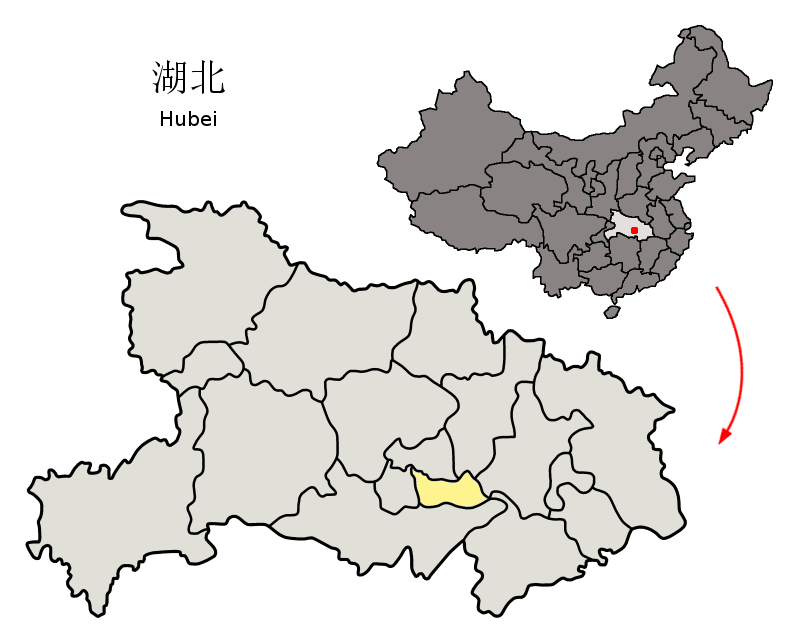
Location of Xiantao in the province

Subdistricts:

- Shazui Subdistrict (沙嘴街道), Ganhe Subdistrict (干河街道), Longhuashan Subdistrict (龙华山街道)

Towns:

- Zhengchang (郑场镇), Maozui (毛嘴镇), Louhe (剅河镇), Sanfutan (三伏潭镇), Huchang (胡场镇), Changtangkou (长埫口镇), Xiliuhe (西流河镇), Shahu (沙湖镇), Yanglinwei (杨林尾镇), Pengchang (彭场镇), Zhanggou (张沟镇), Guohe (郭河镇), Miancheng Hui Town (沔城回族镇), Tonghaikou (通海口镇), Chenchang (陈场镇)

Other Areas:

- Xiantao Industrial Park (仙桃工业园区), Jiuheyuan (九合垸原种场), Shahu (沙湖原种场), Paihu Paihu Scenic Area (排湖风景区), Wuhu Fishery (五湖渔场), Zhaoxiyuan Forestry Area (赵西垸林场), Liujiayuan Forestry Area (刘家垸林场), Chuqinliang Seed Stock Station (畜禽良种场)

== Xiaogan ==
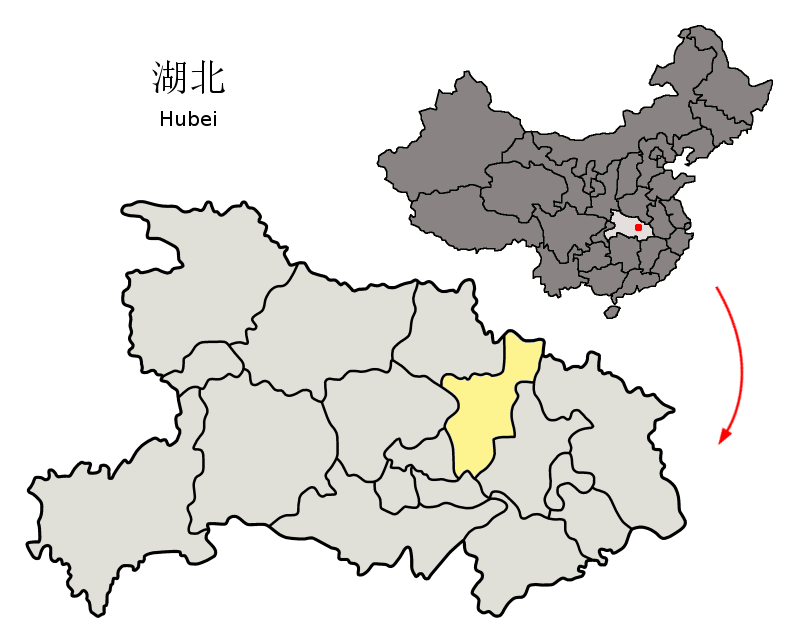
Location of Xiaogan in the province

=== Xiaonan District ===
Subdistricts:

- Shuyuan Subdistrict (书院街道), Xinhua Subdistrict (新华街道), Guangchang Subdistrict (广场街道), Chezhan Subdistrict (车站街道)

Towns:

- Xinpu (新铺镇), Xihe (西河镇), Yangdian (杨店镇), Dougang (陡岗镇), Xiaogang (肖港镇), Maochen (毛陈镇), Sancha (三汊镇), Zhuzhan (祝站镇)

Townships:

- Pengxing Township (朋兴乡), Wolong Township (卧龙乡), Minji Township (闵集乡)

Other areas:

- Xiaonan Economic Development Area (孝南区经济开发区), Zhuhu Management Office (朱湖办事处), Dongshantou Management Office (东山头办事处), Danyang Management Office (孝感开发区丹阳办事处), Xiaotian Management Office (孝感开发区孝天办事处), Huaiyin Management Office (孝感开发区槐荫办事处)

=== Anlu ===
Two subdistricts:

- Fucheng Subdistrict (府城街道), Nancheng Subdistrict (南城街道)

Nine towns:

- Zhaopeng (赵棚镇), Lidian (李店镇), Xundian (巡店镇), Tangdi (棠棣镇), Leigong (雷公镇), Wangyizhen (王义贞镇), Yandian (烟店镇), Bofan (孛畈镇), Fushui (洑水镇/伏水镇)

Four townships:

- Chendian Township (陈店乡), Xinzha Township (辛榨乡), Muzi Township (木梓乡), Jieguan Township (接官乡)

One other area:

- Anlu Economic Development Area (安陆市开发区)

=== Hanchuan ===
Two subdistricts:

- Xiannüshan Subdistrict (仙女山街道) and Diaodong Subdistrict (汈东街道)

Fourteen towns:

- Makou (马口镇), Maiwang (脉旺镇), Chenghuang (城隍镇), Fenshui (分水镇), Chenhu (沉湖镇), Tian'erhe (田二河镇), Huilong (回龙镇), Xinyan (新堰镇), Tongzhong (垌冢镇/垌塚镇), Mahe (麻河镇), Liujiage (刘家隔镇), Xinhe (新河镇), Miaotou (庙头镇), Yanglingou (杨林沟镇)

Six townships:

- Xijiang Township (西江乡), Wantan Township (湾潭乡), Nanhe Township (南河乡), Ma'an Township (马鞍乡), Litan Township (里潭乡), Hanji Township (韩集乡)

Five other areas:

- Hanchuan Economic and Technological Development Zone (汉川市经济技术开发区), Diaocha Lake Breeding Farm (汈汊湖养殖场), Huayan Farm (华严农场), Sanxingyuan Farm (三星垸农场), Zhongzhou Farm (中洲农场)

=== Yingcheng ===
Five subdistricts:

- Chengzhong Subdistrict (城中街道), Chengbei Subdistrict (城北街道), Silipeng Subdistrict (四里棚街道), Dongmafang Subdistrict (东马坊街道), Changjiangbu Subdistrict (长江埠街道)

Ten towns:

- Tiandian (田店镇), Yanghe (杨河镇), Sanhe (三合镇), Langjun (郎君镇), Huangtan (黄滩镇), Tian'e (天鹅镇), Yihe (义和镇), Chenhe (陈河镇), Yangling (杨岭镇), Tangchi (汤池镇)

Two other areas:

- Yingcheng Economic Area (经济技术开发区), Nanyuan Farm (南垸良种场)

=== Dawu County ===
Towns:

Towns:

- Chengguan (城关镇), Yangping (阳平镇), Fangfan (芳畈镇), Xincheng (新城镇), Xiadian (夏店镇), Liuji (刘集镇), Hekou (河口镇), Sigu (四姑镇), Lüwang (吕王镇), Huangzhan (黄站镇), Xuanhuadian (宣化店镇), Fengdian (丰店镇), Daxin (大新镇), Sanli (三里镇)

Townships:

- Gaodian Township (高店乡), Pengdian Township (彭店乡), Dongxin Township (东新乡)

Other areas:

- Economic Development District (经济开发区), High-speed Railway New Area (高铁新区)

=== Xiaochang County ===
Eight towns:

- Huayuan (花园镇), Fengshan (丰山镇), Zhouxiang (周巷镇), Xiaohe (小河镇), Wangdian (王店镇), Weidian (卫店镇), Baisha (白沙镇), Zougang (邹岗镇)

Four townships:

- Xiaowu Township (小悟乡), Jidian Township (季店乡), Huaxi Township (花西乡), Doushan Township (陡山乡)

Three other areas:

- Xiaochang County Economic Development Area (孝昌县开发区), Shuangyin Lake Ecology & Culture Tourism & Vacation Area (观音湖生态文化旅游渡假区), Shuangfeng Mountain Tourism & Vacation Area (双峰山旅游渡假区)

=== Yunmeng County ===
Towns:

- Chengguan (城关镇), Yitang (义堂镇), Zengdian (曾店镇), Wupu (吴铺镇), Wuluo (伍洛镇), Xiaxindian (下辛店镇), Daoqiao (道桥镇), Geputan (隔蒲潭镇), Hujindian (胡金店镇)

Townships:

- Daodian Township (倒店乡), Shahe Township (沙河乡), Qingminghe Township (清明河乡)

Other area:

- Yunmeng County Economic Development Area (云梦县经济开发区)

== Yichang ==
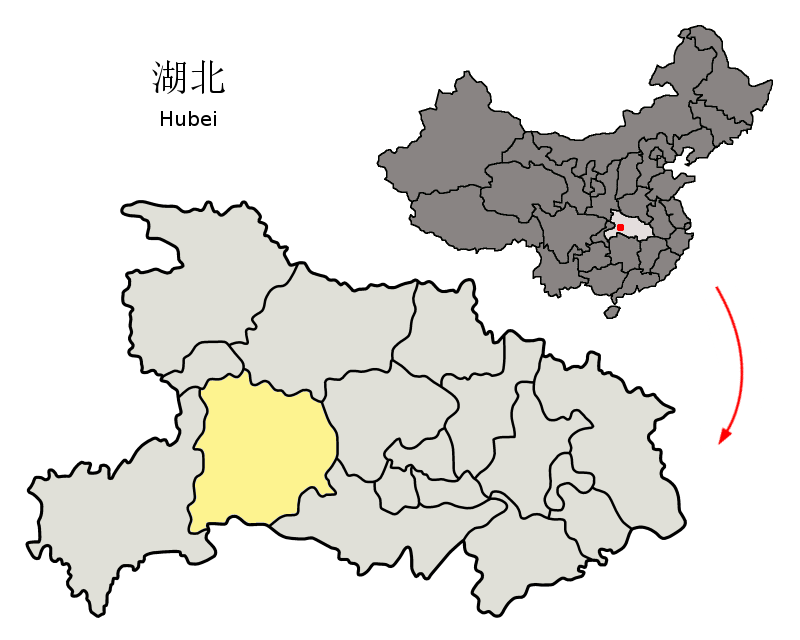
Location of Yichang in the province

=== Dianjun District ===
The only subdistrict is Dianjun Subdistrict (点军街道)

Two towns:

- Aijia (艾家镇), Qiaobian (桥边镇)

Two townships:

- Lianpeng Township (联棚乡), Tucheng Township (土城乡)

=== Wujiagang District ===
Four subdistricts:

- Dagongqiao Subdistrict (大公桥街道), Wanshouqiao Subdistrict (万寿桥街道), Baotahe Subdistrict (宝塔河街道), Wujiagang Subdistrict (伍家岗街道)

The only township is Wujia Township (伍家乡)

=== Xiling District ===
Subdistricts:

- Xiling Subdistrict (西陵街道), Xueyuan Subdistrict (学院街道), Yunji Subdistrict (云集街道), Xiba Subdistrict (西坝街道), Gezhouba Subdistrict (葛洲坝街道), Yemingzhu Subdistrict (夜明珠街道), Dongyuan Subdistrict (东苑街道), Nanyuan Subdistrict (南苑街道), Beiyuan Subdistrict (北苑街道)

The only township is Yaowan Township (窑湾乡)

Other area:

- Xiakou Scenic Area (峡口风景区)

=== Xiaoting District ===
Three subdistricts:

- Gulaobei Subdistrict (古老背街道), Huya Subdistrict (虎牙街道), Yunchi Subdistrict (云池街道)

=== Yiling District ===
Subdistricts:

- Xiaoxita Subdistrict (小溪塔街道), Yiling Economic Development Zone Subdistrict (夷陵经济开发区街道)

Towns:

- Zhangcunping (樟村坪镇), Wuduhe (雾渡河镇), Fenxiang (分乡镇), Taipingxi (太平溪镇), Sandouping (三斗坪镇), Letianxi (乐天溪镇), Longquan (龙泉镇), Yaqueling (鸦鹊岭镇), Huanghua (黄花镇)

Townships:

- Xiabaoping Township (下堡坪乡), Dengcun Township (邓村乡)

=== Dangyang ===
Three subdistricts:

- Yuyang Subdistrict (玉阳街道), Baling Subdistrict (坝陵街道), Yuquan Subdistrict (玉泉街道)

Seven towns:

- Lianghe (两河镇), Herong (河溶镇), Yuxi (淯溪镇/育溪镇), Miaoqian (庙前镇), Wangdian (王店镇), Banyue (半月镇), Caobuhu (草埠湖镇)

=== Yidu ===
The only subdistrict is Lucheng Subdistrict (陆城街道)

Towns:

- Honghuatao (红花套镇), Gaobazhou (高坝洲镇), Niejiahe (聂家河镇), Songmuping (松木坪镇), Zhicheng (枝城镇), Yaojiadian (姚家店镇), Wuyanquan (五眼泉镇), Wangjiafan (王家畈镇)

Townships:

- Panjiawan Tujia Ethnic Township (潘家湾土家族乡)

=== Zhijiang ===
One subdistrict:

- Majiadian Subdistrict (马家店街道)

Eight towns:

- Anfusi (安福寺镇), Baiyang (白洋镇), Gujiadian (顾家店镇), Dongshi (董市镇), Xiannü (仙女镇), Wen'an (问安镇), Qixingtai (七星台镇), Bailizhou (百里洲镇)

=== Changyang Tujia Autonomous County ===
Eight towns:

- Longzhouping (龙舟坪镇), Gaojiayan (高家堰镇), Moshi (磨市镇), Duzhenwan (都镇湾镇), Ziqiu (资丘镇), Yuxiakou (渔峡口镇), Langping (榔坪镇), Hejiaping (贺家坪镇)

Three townships:

- Dayan Township (大堰乡), Yazikou Township (鸭子口乡), Huoshaoping Township (火烧坪乡)

=== Wufeng Tujia Autonomous County ===
Five towns:

- Wufeng (五峰镇), Changleping (长乐坪镇), Yuyangguan (渔洋关镇), Renheping (仁和坪镇), Wantan (湾潭镇)

Three townships:

- Fujiayan Township (付家堰乡), Niuzhuang Township (牛庄乡), Caihua Township (采花乡)

=== Xingshan County ===
Six towns:

- Gufu (古夫镇), Zhaojun (昭君镇), Xiakou (峡口镇), Nanyang (南阳镇), Huangliang (黄粮镇), Shuiyuesi (水月寺镇)

Two townships:

- Gaoqiao Township (高桥乡), Zhenzi Township (榛子乡)

=== Yuan'an County ===
Six towns:

- Mingfeng (鸣凤镇), Hualinsi (花林寺镇), Jiuxian (旧县镇), Yangping (洋坪镇), Maopingchang (茅坪场镇), Hehua (荷花镇)

The only township is Hekou Township (河口乡)

=== Zigui County ===
Eight towns:

- Maoping (茅坪镇), Guizhou (归州镇), Quyuan (屈原镇), Shazhenxi (沙镇溪镇), Lianghekou (两河口镇), Guojiaba (郭家坝镇), Yanglinqiao (杨林桥镇), Jiuwanxi (九畹溪镇)

Four townships:

- Shuitianba Township (水田坝乡), Xietan Township (泄滩乡), Meijiahe Township (梅家河乡), Moping Township (磨坪乡)
