= Qianjin =

Qianjin may refer to:

== Mainland China ==
- Qianjin Princess, 6th-century Sino-Tuoba poet
- Qianjin District, Jiamusi (前进区), Heilongjiang

Subdistricts (前进街道)

- Qianjin Subdistrict, Jiayuguan, in Jiayuguan City, Gansu
- Qianjin Subdistrict, Guangzhou, in Tianhe District, Guangzhou, Guangdong
- Qianjin Subdistrict, Mudanjiang, in Yangming District, Mudanjiang, Heilongjiang
- Qianjin Subdistrict, Yichun, Heilongjiang, in Yichun District, Yichun, Heilongjiang
- Qianjin Subdistrict, Sanmenxia, in Hubin District, Sanmenxia, Henan
- Qianjin Subdistrict, Shangqiu, in Liangyuan District, Shangqiu, Henan
- Qianjin Subdistrict, Xinyang, in Pingqiao District, Xinyang, Henan
- Qianjin Subdistrict, Wuhan, in Jianghan District, Wuhan, Hubei
- Qianjin Subdistrict, Benxi, in Pingshan District, Benxi, Liaoning
- Qianjin Subdistrict, Chaoyang, Liaoning, in Shuangta District, Chaoyang, Liaoning
- Qianjin Subdistrict, Shenyang, in Dongling District, Shenyang, Liaoning

Towns

- Qianjin, Huzhou (千金镇), in Nanxun District, Huzhou, Zhejiang

Written as "前进镇":

- Qianjin, Lianshui County, in Lianshui County, Jiangsu
- Qianjin, Qionglai, in Qionglai City, Sichuan

Townships (前进乡)

- Qianjin Township, Hailun, in Hailun City, Heilongjiang
- Qianjin Township, Nenjiang County, in Nenjiang County, Jilin
- Qianjin Township, Changling County, in Changling County, Jilin
- Qianjin Township, Jiaohe, in Jiaohe City, Jilin
- Qianjin Township, Yushu, Jilin, in Yushu City, Jilin
- Qianjin Township, Lingyuan, in Lingyuan City, Liaoning
- Qianjin Township, Ankang, in Hanbin District, Ankang, Shaanxi

Village (前进村)

- Qianjin, Gaocheng, in Gaocheng, Sui County, Suizhou, Hubei

== Taiwan ==
- Cianjin District, Kaohsiung (前金區), district of Kaohsiung

== See also ==
- Jun Jin (born 1980), South Korean singer
