= Dongwan =

Dongwan may refer to:

- Dongguan, city in Guangzhou, southern China
- Dongwan, Jingyuan County, town in Gansu, China
- Dongwan, Qitai County, town in Xinjiang, China
- Dongwan, Shawan County, town in Xinjiang, China
- Dongwan, Wudian, a village in Wudian, Guangshui, Suizhou, Hubei, China

== See also ==
- Kim Dong Wan (born 1979), Korean singer
