= Zijin =

Zijin (Chinese: 紫金; pinyin: Zǐjīn; lit. 'purple gold') may refer to:

- Zijin County, Guangdong
- Zijin, Hubei, town in Gucheng County
- Zijin Mountain, or Purple Mountain, in eastern Nanjing
- Zijin Mining, a gold mining enterprise in Fujian
