= Yingshan County =

Yingshan County may refer to two existing counties as well as a former county of the People's Republic of China:

- Yingshan County, Hubei (英山县), Huanggang, Hubei
- Yingshan County, Sichuan (营山县), Nanchong, Sichuan
- Yingshan Subdistrict (应山街道), Guangshui, Suizhou, Hubei
- Guangshui, Suizhou, Hubei was known as Yingshan County (应山县) before December 1988
