= Xiaochang County =

Xiaochang County 孝昌县
- County
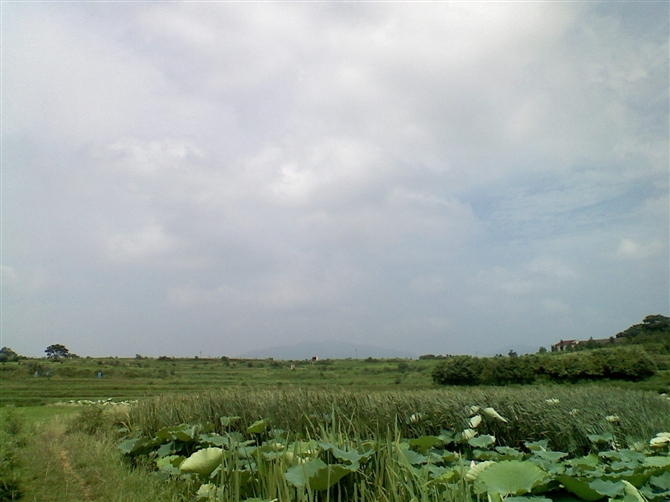
- Skyline of Xiaochang County

- Location of the seat in Hubei
- Coordinates (Xiaochang government): 31°15′29″N 113°59′53″E
- Country: People's Republic of China
- Province: Hubei
- Prefecture-level city: Xiaogan
- Township-level Divisions: 15 township-level divisions

Population (2020)
  - Total: 483,367
- Time zone: UTC+8 (China Standard)
- Website: www.xiaochang.gov.cn

Xiaochang County (simplified Chinese: 孝昌县; traditional Chinese: 孝昌縣; pinyin: Xiàochāng Xiàn) is a county of eastern Hubei province, People's Republic of China. It is under the administration of Xiaogan City.

== Administrative divisions ==
Xiaochang County is divided into 8 towns, 4 townships and 3 other areas:

- Huayuan (花园镇), Fengshan (丰山镇), Zhouxiang (周巷镇), Xiaohe (小河镇), Wangdian (王店镇), Weidian (卫店镇), Baisha (白沙镇), Zougang (邹岗镇)

Townships:

- Xiaowu Township (小悟乡), Jidian Township (季店乡), Huaxi Township (花西乡), Doushan Township (陡山乡)

Other Areas:

- Xiaochang County Economic Development Area (孝昌县开发区), Shuangyin Lake Ecology & Culture Tourism & Vacation Area (观音湖生态文化旅游渡假区), Shuangfeng Mountain Tourism & Vacation Area (双峰山旅游渡假区)

== Climate ==
Climate data for Xiaochang, elevation 52 m (171 ft), (1991–2020 normals, extremes 1991–present)
Month	Jan	Feb	Mar	Apr	May	Jun	Jul	Aug	Sep	Oct	Nov	Dec	Year
Record high °C (°F)	24.3 (75.7)	28.0 (82.4)	30.6 (87.1)	33.3 (91.9)	35.0 (95.0)	36.9 (98.4)	39.0 (102.2)	39.9 (103.8)	37.8 (100.0)	36.2 (97.2)	28.9 (84.0)	21.4 (70.5)	39.9 (103.8)
Mean daily maximum °C (°F)	7.9 (46.2)	11.0 (51.8)	17.0 (62.6)	22.7 (72.9)	27.4 (81.3)	30.2 (86.4)	32.5 (90.5)	33.0 (91.4)	28.7 (83.7)	23.4 (74.1)	16.8 (62.2)	10.7 (51.3)	21.8 (71.2)
Daily mean °C (°F)	3.5 (38.3)	6.4 (43.5)	11.9 (53.4)	17.4 (63.3)	22.5 (72.5)	25.8 (78.4)	28.4 (83.1)	28.2 (82.8)	23.6 (74.5)	18.0 (64.4)	11.5 (52.7)	5.8 (42.4)	16.9 (62.4)
Mean daily minimum °C (°F)	0.3 (32.5)	2.9 (37.2)	8.0 (46.4)	13.2 (55.8)	18.3 (64.9)	22.2 (72.0)	25.1 (77.2)	24.7 (76.5)	20.1 (68.2)	14.2 (57.6)	7.8 (46.0)	2.3 (36.1)	13.3 (55.9)
Record low °C (°F)	−8.2 (17.2)	−7.6 (18.3)	−2.0 (28.4)	2.5 (36.5)	10.1 (50.2)	15.9 (60.6)	18.0 (64.4)	15.5 (59.9)	10.9 (51.6)	4.5 (40.1)	−3.4 (25.9)	−7.0 (19.4)	−8.2 (17.2)
Average precipitation mm (inches)	33.2 (1.31)	41.1 (1.62)	60.9 (2.40)	96.4 (3.80)	128.6 (5.06)	163.2 (6.43)	236.5 (9.31)	140.4 (5.53)	62.7 (2.47)	69.3 (2.73)	46.5 (1.83)	17.4 (0.69)	1,096.2 (43.18)
Average precipitation days (≥ 0.1 mm)	7.9	9.3	10.5	9.3	11.8	11.0	11.6	9.4	8.1	9.3	8.6	5.9	112.7
Average snowy days	4.2	2.4	0.5	0	0	0	0	0	0	0	0.6	1.0	8.7
Average relative humidity (%)	70	72	70	70	73	78	80	78	76	73	72	67	73
Mean monthly sunshine hours	96.0	93.9	139.6	160.8	161.4	145.4	193.2	212.2	146.1	141.4	126.5	117.7	1,734.2
Percentage possible sunshine	30	30	37	41	38	34	45	52	40	40	40	38	39
Source: China Meteorological Administrationall-time May low
