= Xieshan =

- Location in China
- Coordinates: 32.1749109°N 111.4173049°E
- Country: China
- Province: Hubei

Xieshan (Chinese: 薤山) is a mountain resort in Gucheng County, Hubei province, China, 35 kilometers southwest of Xiangyang city. It was established by Western Protestant missionaries
