= Kingold Jewelry =

Chinese jewelry company

Wuhan Kingold Jewelry Inc.
- Simplified Chinese: 武汉金凰珠宝股份有限公司
- Traditional Chinese: 武漢金凰珠寶股份有限公司
Transcriptions
Standard Mandarin
- Hanyu Pinyin: Wǔhàn Jīnhuáng Zhūbǎo Gǔfènyǒuxiàngōngsī

Kingold Jewelry is a Chinese jewelry company with its headquarters in the Huangpu Science & Technology Park in Jiangan District, Wuhan, Hubei. It also has an office in New York City. As of 2020 the chairperson is Jia Zhihong and the company is the largest gold processor in the province that is not owned by the Chinese government nor provincial nor local governments.

The company had several trust products but investors in 2019 never received money they asked for. Dongguan Trust Co. Ltd., which investigated Kingold in order to liquidate its capital, found that some purported gold bars used as collateral were copper with gold plating. The loans were to be worth $2.8 billion U.S. dollars.
