= Yiyuan Subdistrict, Wuhan =

Yiyuan Subdistrict 一元街道
- Subdistrict
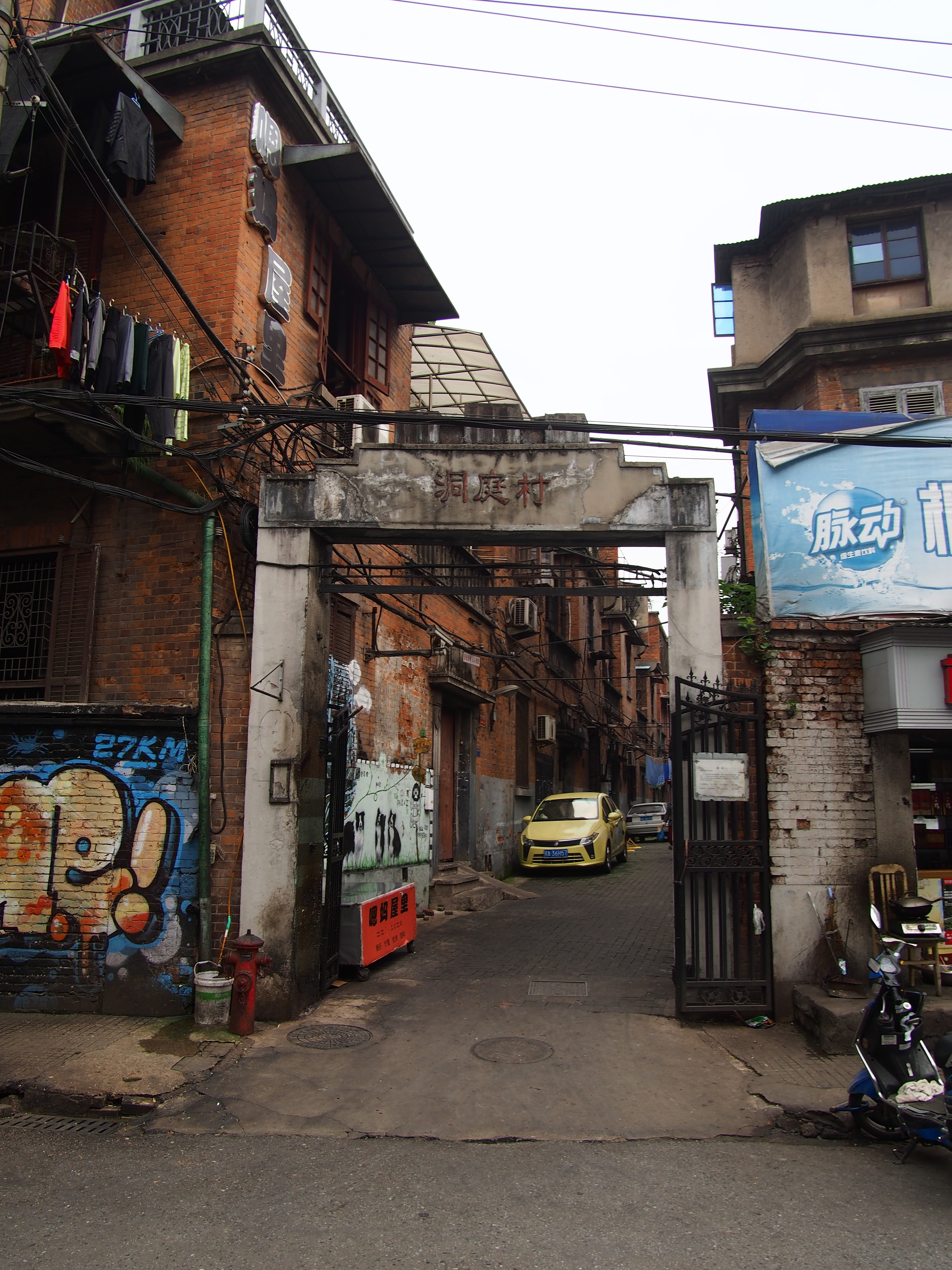
- Old buildings in Dongting Community in 2016

- Location in Hubei
- Coordinates: 30°35′31″N 114°17′42″E
- Country: People's Republic of China
- Province: Hubei
- Prefecture-level city: Wuhan
- District: Jiang'an District
- Time zone: UTC+8 (China Standard)

Yiyuan Subdistrict (Chinese: 一元街道; pinyin: Yīyuán Jiēdào) is a subdistrict in Jiang'an District, Wuhan, Hubei, China. As of 2023, it administers seven residential communities: Yuefei (岳飞), Tongxing (同兴), Sanyang (三阳), Tianjin (天津), Yangzi (扬子), Tongfu (同福), and Dongting (洞庭).

== See also ==
- List of township-level divisions of Hubei
