= Jingzhou, Jingzhou =

Jingzhou 荆州区
- District
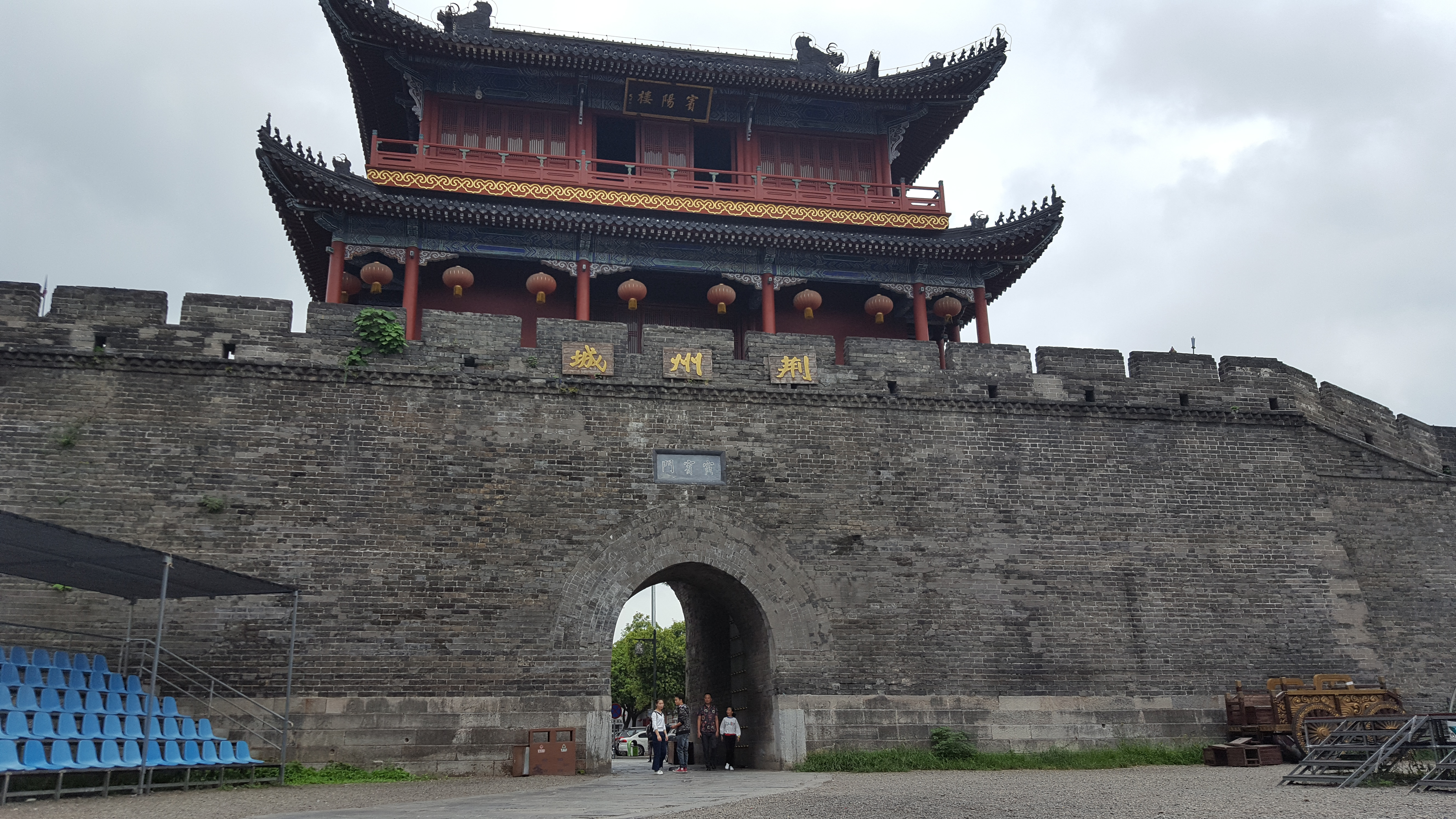
- Jingshan Ancient City Binyang Tower

- Location in Hubei
- Coordinates: 30°21′41″N 112°12′04″E
- Country: People's Republic of China
- Province: Hubei
- Prefecture-level city: Jingzhou

Population (2020)
  - Total: 563,398
- Time zone: UTC+8 (China Standard)
- Website: http://www.jingzhouqu.gov.cn/

Jingzhou District (simplified Chinese: 荆州区; traditional Chinese: 荊州區; pinyin: Jīngzhōu Qū) is a district of the city of Jingzhou, Hubei, Central China.

== Administrative divisions ==
Three subdistricts:

- Xicheng Subdistrict (西城街道), Dongcheng Subdistrict (东城街道), Chengnan Subdistrict (城南街道)

Seven towns:

- Jinan (纪南镇), Chuandian (川店镇), Mashan (马山镇), Balingshan (八岭山镇), Libu (李埠镇), Mishi (弥市镇), Yingcheng (郢城镇)

Two other areas:

- Taihugang (太湖港农场管理区), Lingjiaohu (菱角湖农场管理区)
