= Jiang'an railway station =

Closed railway station in Wuhan, Hubei

Jiang'an 江岸
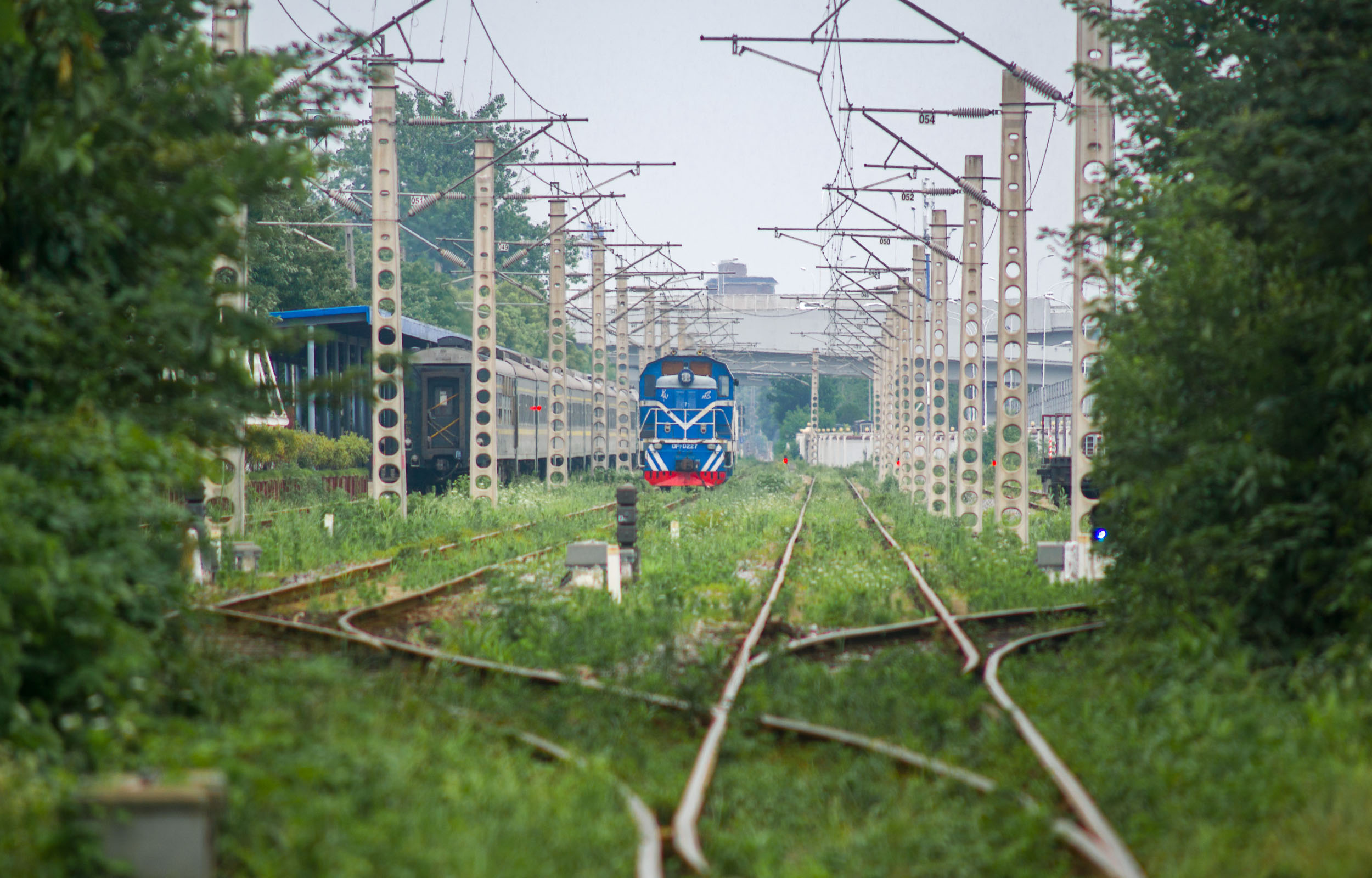

General information
- Location: Jiang'an District, Wuhan, Hubei; China

History
- Opened: 1903 (Construction started in 1898)
- Closed: 2021
Location

Jiang'an railway station (Chinese: 江岸站) was a former freight-handling station in Jiang'an District, Wuhan, Hubei, China. It was once the largest freight-handling station in Wuhan.

== History ==
Jiang'an railway station started construction in 1898 and opened in 1903. With the fifth national speed increase on 18 April 2004, all passenger services to Jiang'an station were diverted or suspended and the station became used exclusively for freight handling.

By 2012, the station had been reduced to six lines. In April 2021, an expansion of the nearby Danshuichi railway station was completed. All trains were subsequently transferred to Danshuichi railway station. Jiang'an railway station was then demolished and the branch line it was on, lifted.
