= Shihua, Hubei =

Shihua 石花镇
- Town
- Location in Hubei
- Coordinates: 32°16′27″N 111°28′18″E
- Country: People's Republic of China
- Province: Hubei
- Prefecture-level city: Xiangyang
- County: Gucheng
- Village-level divisions: 8 residential communities, 38 villages
- Elevation: 104 m (341 ft)

Population (2010)
  - Total: 108,753
- Time zone: UTC+8 (China Standard)
- Postal code: 441705

Shihua (Chinese: 石花; pinyin: Shíhuā; lit. 'stone flower') is a town of Gucheng County in northwestern Hubei province, China, located against the immediate backdrop of the Daba Mountains. As of 2011, it has 8 residential communities (社区) and 38 villages under its administration.

== Administrative divisions ==
Eight residential communities:

- Dongmenjie (东门街社区), Xihejie (西河街社区), Shixijie (石溪街社区), Cangtaijie (苍苔街社区), Houfan (后畈社区), Minyingjingjiqu (民营经济区社区), Dayuqiaojie (大峪桥街社区), Laojuntai (老君台社区)

Thirty-eight villages:

- Jiepaiya (界牌垭村), Hongmamiao (红马庙村), Tiemiaogou (铁庙沟村), Huangjiaying (黄家营村), Pingchuan (平川村), Peijiaqiao (裴家桥村), Gongjiawan (巩家湾村), Yangxiwan (杨溪湾村), Shuixingtai (水星台村), Xiaxindian (下新店村), Zhoujiawan (周家湾村), Shijiawan (施家湾村), Pengjiawan (彭家湾村), Caijiaying (蔡家营村), Gaojiachong (高家冲村), Dayu (大峪村), Shaojialou (邵家楼村), Doupodian (陡坡店村), Biaojiamiao (彪家庙村), Tuqiaogou (土桥沟村), Tongbeimiao (同北庙村), Yinfan (殷畈村), Liangshuijing (凉水井村), Pengjialing (彭家岭村), Xijiaya (席家垭村), Wujiazhou (五家洲村), Yanwan (岩湾村), Cangyu (苍峪村), Baijiayan (白家堰村), Tongshan (铜山村), Cuihuapu (翠花铺村), Jiangjunshan (将军山村), Yangjiahu (杨家湖村), Xiaotanshan (小坦山村), Chenjialou (陈家楼村), Longjiagou (龙家沟村), Longwan (龙湾村)

== See also ==
- List of township-level divisions of Hubei
