= Baisha, Xiaochang County =

Baisha 白沙镇
- Town
- Location in Hubei
- Coordinates: 31°8′3″N 113°53′28″E
- Country: People's Republic of China
- Province: Hubei
- Prefecture-level city: Xiaogan
- County: Xiaochang County
- Time zone: UTC+8 (China Standard)

Baisha (Chinese: 白沙) is a town in Xiaochang County, Hubei, China. As of 2018, it has one residential community and 40 villages under its administration.
