= Wudian, Guangshui =

Wudian 吴店镇
- Town
- Location in Hubei
- Coordinates (Wudian government): 31°55′40″N 113°39′08″E
- Country: People's Republic of China
- Province: Hubei
- Prefecture-level city: Suizhou
- County-level city: Guangshui
- Elevation: 148 m (486 ft)

Population (2010)
  - Total: 22,383
- Time zone: UTC+8 (China Standard)
- Postal code: 432713
- Area code: 0722

Wudian (simplified Chinese: 吴店; traditional Chinese: 吳店; pinyin: Wúdiàn) is a town under the administration of the county-level city of Guangshui in northern Hubei province, China, abutting the western edge of the Daba Mountains and 35 kilometres (22 mi) northeast of downtown Suizhou. As of 2017, it has 1 community and 14 villages under its administration.

== Administrative divisions ==
One community:

- Dongmenlou (东门楼社区)

Fourteen villages:

- Shuangxiang (双乡村), Quankou (泉口村), Louziwan (楼子湾村), Shuanggang (双岗村), Donghe (东河村), Wangzidian (王子店村), Zhongxin (中心村), Dongwan (东湾村), Yangjia'ao (杨家坳村), Zhimawan (芝麻湾村), Jiangxidian (浆溪店村), Santumen (三土门村), Tangfan (塘畈村), Xujiashan (徐家山村)

== See also ==
- List of township-level divisions of Hubei
