= Hualou Subdistrict =

Hualou Subdistrict 花楼街道
- Subdistrict
- Location of Hualou Subdistrict in Hubei
- Coordinates: 30°35′51″N 114°17′51″E
- Country: China
- Province: Hubei
- Prefecture-level city: Wuhan
- District: Jianghan District
- Time zone: UTC+8 (China Standard)

Hualou Subdistrict (simplified Chinese: 花楼街道; traditional Chinese: 花樓街道; pinyin: Huālóu jiedao) is a subdistrict in Jianghan District, Wuhan, Hubei, China.
