= Huaxi Township, Hubei =

Huaxi Township 花西乡
- Township
- Location in Hubei
- Coordinates: 31°11′41″N 113°51′21″E
- Country: People's Republic of China
- Province: Hubei
- Prefecture-level city: Xiaogan
- County: Xiaochang County
- Time zone: UTC+8 (China Standard)

Huaxi Township (simplified Chinese: 花西乡; traditional Chinese: 花西鄉; pinyin: Huāxī Xiāng) is a township under the administration of Xiaochang County, Hubei, China. As of 2018, it has one residential community and 33 villages under its administration.
