= Changqing Subdistrict, Jianghan District =

Changqing Subdistrict 常青街道
- Subdistrict
- Location of Changqing Subdistrict in Hubei
- Coordinates: 30°36′23″N 114°14′23″E
- Country: China
- Province: Hubei
- Prefecture-level city: Wuhan
- District: Jianghan District
- Time zone: UTC+8 (China Standard)

Changqing Subdistrict (Chinese: 常青街道; pinyin: Changqing Jiēdào) is a subdistrict in Jianghan District, Wuhan, Hubei, China.
