= Yingcheng, Jingzhou =

Yingcheng 郢城镇
- Town
- Location in Hubei
- Coordinates: 30°22′7″N 112°12′1″E
- Country: People's Republic of China
- Province: Hubei
- Prefecture-level city: Jingzhou
- District: Jingzhou District
- Time zone: UTC+8 (China Standard)

Yingcheng (Chinese: 郢城; pinyin: Yǐngchéng) is a town in Jingzhou District, Jingzhou, Hubei province, China. As of 2020, it administers the following four residential communities and six villages:

- Cha'ansi Community (茶庵寺社区)
- Hetao Community (河套社区)
- Juxian Community (聚贤社区)
- Fengming Community (凤鸣社区)
- Xinsheng Village (新生村)
- Taihui Village (太晖村)
- Jing'an Village (荆安村)
- Jingbei Village (荆北村)
- Wutai Village (五台村)
- Yingnan Village (郢南村)
