= Minyi Subdistrict =

Minyi Subdistrict 民意街道
- Subdistrict
- Location of Minyi Subdistrict in Hubei
- Coordinates: 30°34′55″N 114°16′30″E
- Country: China
- Province: Hubei
- Prefecture-level city: Wuhan
- District: Jianghan District

Population (2010)
  - Total: 35,693
- Time zone: UTC+8 (China Standard)

Minyi Subdistrict (Chinese: 民意街道; pinyin: Mínyì jiedao) is a subdistrict in Jianghan District, Wuhan, Hubei, China.
