= Tangjiadun Subdistrict =

Tangjiadun Subdistrict 唐家墩街道
- Subdistrict
- Location of Tangjiadun Subdistrict in Hubei
- Coordinates: 30°36′22″N 114°16′18″E
- Country: China
- Province: Hubei
- Prefecture-level city: Wuhan
- District: Jianghan District
- Time zone: UTC+8 (China Standard)

Tangjiadun Subdistrict (Chinese: 唐家墩街道; pinyin: Tangjiadun jiedao) is a subdistrict in Jianghan District, Wuhan, Hubei, China.
