= Qianjin Subdistrict, Wuhan =

Qianjin Subdistrict 前进街道
- Subdistrict
- Location of Qianjin Subdistrict in Hubei
- Coordinates: 30°34′52″N 114°16′49″E
- Country: China
- Province: Hubei
- Prefecture-level city: Wuhan
- District: Jianghan District
- Time zone: UTC+8 (China Standard)

Qianjin Subdistrict (simplified Chinese: 前进街道; traditional Chinese: 前進街道; pinyin: Qiánjìn jiedao) is a subdistrict in Jianghan District, Wuhan, Hubei, China.
