= Minzu Subdistrict =

Minzu Subdistrict 民族街道
- Subdistrict
- Location of Minzu Subdistrict in Hubei
- Coordinates: 30°34′20″N 114°17′10″E
- Country: China
- Province: Hubei
- Prefecture-level city: Wuhan
- District: Jianghan District
- Time zone: UTC+8 (China Standard)

Minzu Subdistrict (Chinese: 民族街道) is a subdistrict in Jianghan District, Wuhan, Hubei, China.
