= Minquan Subdistrict, Hubei =

Minquan Subdistrict 民权街道
- Subdistrict
- Location of Minquan Subdistrict in Hubei
- Coordinates: 30°34′44″N 114°17′0″E
- Country: China
- Province: Hubei
- Prefecture-level city: Wuhan
- District: Jianghan District
- Time zone: UTC+8 (China Standard)

Minquan Subdistrict (simplified Chinese: 民权街道; traditional Chinese: 民權街道; pinyin: Mínquán Jiēdào) is a subdistrict in Jianghan District, Wuhan, Hubei, China.
