= Manchun Subdistrict =

Manchun Subdistrict 满春街道
- Subdistrict
- Location of Manchun Subdistrict in Hubei
- Coordinates: 30°34′33″N 114°16′40″E
- Country: China
- Province: Hubei
- Prefecture-level city: Wuhan
- District: Jianghan District
- Time zone: UTC+8 (China Standard)

Manchun Subdistrict (simplified Chinese: 满春街道; traditional Chinese: 滿春街道; pinyin: Mǎnchūn jiedao) is a subdistrict in Jianghan District, Wuhan, Hubei, China.
