= Guangshui =

Guangshui 广水市 Kwangshui
- County-level city
- Location in Hubei
- Coordinates: 31°37′01″N 113°49′34″E
- Country: People's Republic of China
- Province: Hubei
- Prefecture-level city: Suizhou

Area
  - County-level city: 2,645.5 km^{2} (1,021.4 sq mi)
  - Urban: 73.85 km^{2} (28.51 sq mi)

Population (2020)
  - County-level city: 710,900
  - Density: 268.7/km^{2} (696.0/sq mi)
  - Urban: 387,070
- Time zone: UTC+8 (China Standard)
- Website: www.zggsw.gov.cn

Guangshui (simplified Chinese: 广水; traditional Chinese: 廣水; pinyin: Guǎngshuǐ) is a city located in northeastern Hubei province, People's Republic of China, near the border with Henan province. Administratively, it is a county-level city of Suizhou City. Guangshui was known as Yingshan County (应山县; 應山縣) before December 1988.

== Kuixing Tower ==
Kuixing Tower is a historic tower in Guangshui. Built in 1377, the tower stands on a hill overlooking the city. Kuixing is the name of a god who is said to live in the constellation of Ursa Major and who governs literature and writing. As Guangshui is a city known for its calligraphy, the connection to Kuixing is apparent. According to legend, many great poets studied in Guangshui, and Li Bai's famous poem called 'A Tranquil Night' was written there.

A Tranquil Night
A bed, I see a silver light,
I wonder if it's frost aground.
Looking up, I find the moon bright;
Bowing, in homesickness I'm drowned.

Traditionally, parents whose children are attending college entrance examinations go there to pray and burn incense.

== Administrative divisions ==
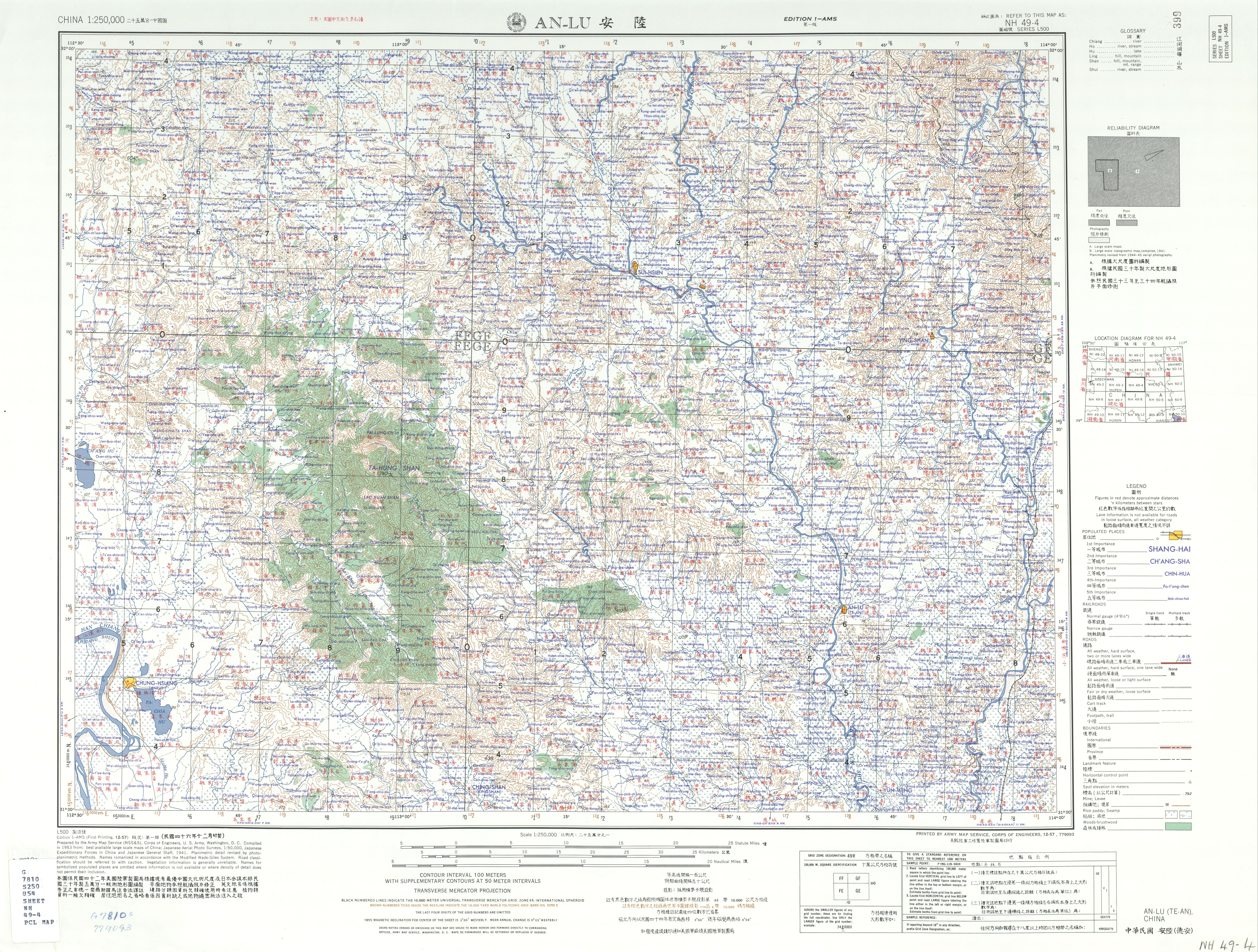
Map including Guangshui (labeled as YING-SHAN 應山) (1953)

Four subdistricts:

- Yingshan Subdistrict (应山街道), Shili Subdistrict (十里街道), Guangshui Subdistrict (广水街道), Chengjiao Subdistrict (城郊街道)

Thirteen towns:

- Wushengguan (武胜关镇), Yangzhai (杨寨镇), Chenxiang (陈巷镇), Changling (长岭镇), Maping (马坪镇), Guanmiao (关庙镇), Yudian (余店镇), Wudian (吴店镇), Haodian (郝店镇), Caihe (蔡河镇), Lidian (李店镇), Taiping (太平镇), Luodian (骆店镇)

Other areas:

- Zhonghuashan Forestry Area (中华山林场), Santan Scenic Area (三潭风景区), Province-level Economic Development Area (省级经济技术开发区)

Historical divisions of Guangshui:

Subdistricts:

- Yingshan Subdistrict (应山街道), Shili Subdistrict (十里街道), Guangshui Subdistrict (广水街道)

Towns:

- Wushengguan (武胜关镇), Yangzhai (杨寨镇), Chenxiang (陈巷镇), Changling (长岭镇), Maping (马坪镇), Guanmiao (关庙镇), Yudian (余店镇), Wudian (吴店镇), Haodian (郝店镇), Caihe (蔡河镇)

Township:

- Chengjiao Township (城郊乡), Lidian Township (李店乡), Taiping Township (太平乡), Luodian Township (骆店乡)

== Climate ==
Climate data for Guangshui, elevation 116 m (381 ft), (1991–2020 normals, extremes 1981–2010)
Month	Jan	Feb	Mar	Apr	May	Jun	Jul	Aug	Sep	Oct	Nov	Dec	Year
Mean daily maximum °C (°F)	7.9 (46.2)	11.0 (51.8)	16.2 (61.2)	22.6 (72.7)	27.3 (81.1)	30.3 (86.5)	32.4 (90.3)	32.2 (90.0)	28.4 (83.1)	23.0 (73.4)	16.5 (61.7)	10.2 (50.4)	21.5 (70.7)
Daily mean °C (°F)	3.2 (37.8)	6.0 (42.8)	10.9 (51.6)	17.1 (62.8)	22.1 (71.8)	25.8 (78.4)	28.2 (82.8)	27.5 (81.5)	23.2 (73.8)	17.5 (63.5)	11.0 (51.8)	5.2 (41.4)	16.5 (61.7)
Mean daily minimum °C (°F)	−0.2 (31.6)	2.2 (36.0)	6.8 (44.2)	12.6 (54.7)	17.8 (64.0)	22.0 (71.6)	24.8 (76.6)	24.0 (75.2)	19.4 (66.9)	13.5 (56.3)	7.1 (44.8)	1.6 (34.9)	12.6 (54.7)
Average precipitation mm (inches)	23.8 (0.94)	34.7 (1.37)	55.7 (2.19)	83.3 (3.28)	116.3 (4.58)	163.1 (6.42)	215.5 (8.48)	122.7 (4.83)	56.5 (2.22)	64.9 (2.56)	39.2 (1.54)	17.6 (0.69)	993.3 (39.1)
Average precipitation days (≥ 0.1 mm)	6.6	8.4	9.7	9.9	11.2	10.2	11.2	10.1	8.3	8.7	7.7	6.0	108
Average snowy days	4.7	3.3	1.3	0.1	0	0	0	0	0	0	0.7	2.1	12.2
Average relative humidity (%)	69	70	69	69	71	76	79	78	73	71	71	68	72
Mean monthly sunshine hours	112.9	115.1	144.7	170.8	178.8	167.4	199.0	206.5	165.8	157.7	140.0	124.4	1,883.1
Percentage possible sunshine	35	37	39	44	42	40	46	51	45	45	45	40	42
Source: China Meteorological Administration
