= Jianghan, Wuhan =

Jianghan 江汉区
- District
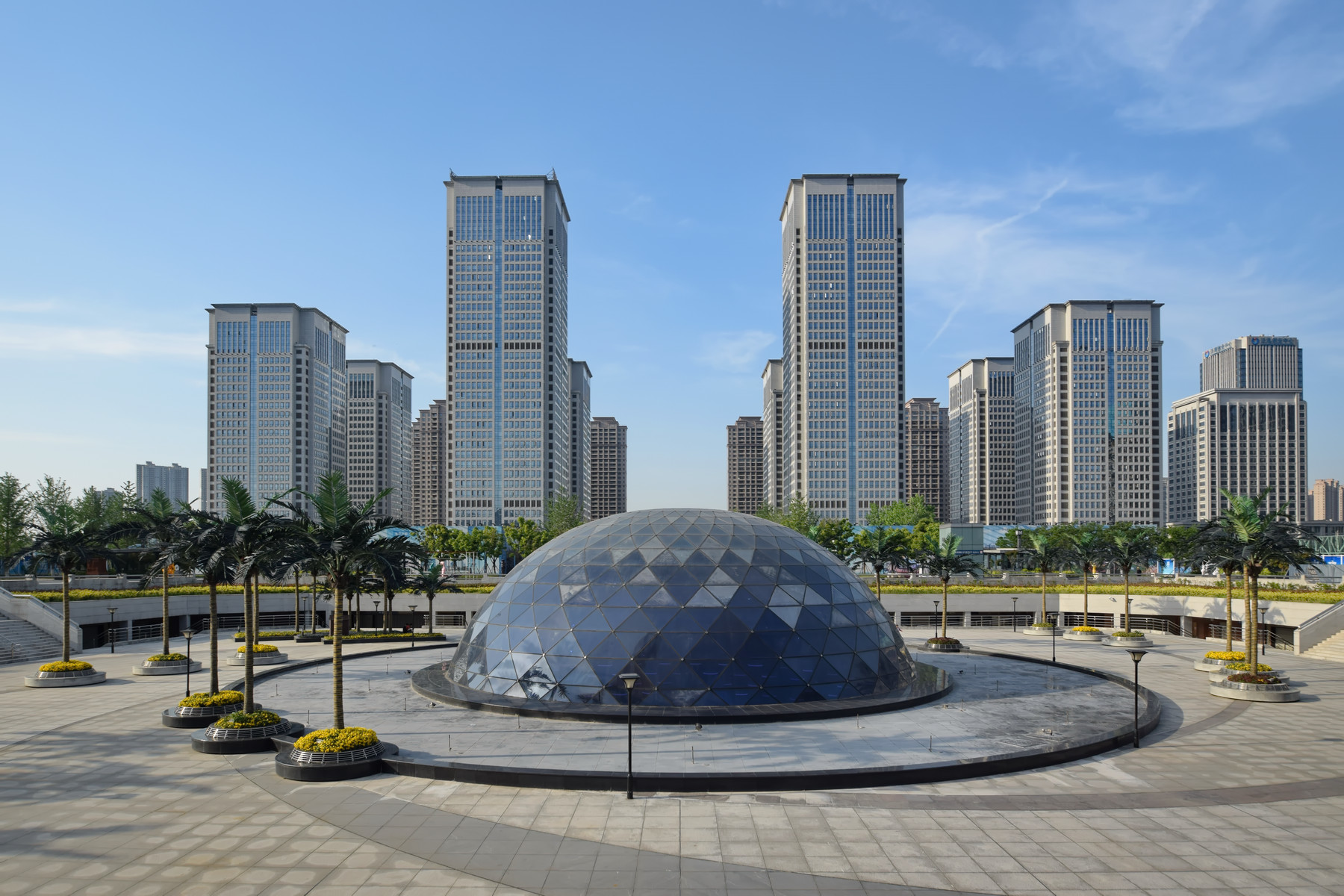
- Wangjiadun CBD
- Interactive map of Jianghan
- Location in Hubei
- Coordinates: 30°36′10″N 114°15′51″E
- Country: People's Republic of China
- Province: Hubei
- Sub-provincial city: Wuhan

Area
  - Total: 33.43 km^{2} (12.91 sq mi)

Population (2020)
  - Total: 647,932
  - Density: 19,380/km^{2} (50,200/sq mi)
- Time zone: UTC+8 (China Standard)
- Website: 武汉市江汉区人民政府 (translation: Wuhan City Jianghan District People's Government) (in Simplified Chinese)

Jianghan District (Chinese: 江汉区; pinyin: Jiānghàn Qū) forms part of the urban core of and is one of 13 urban districts of the prefecture-level city of Wuhan, the capital of Hubei Province, China. The district is part of the historical Hankou.

== Geography ==
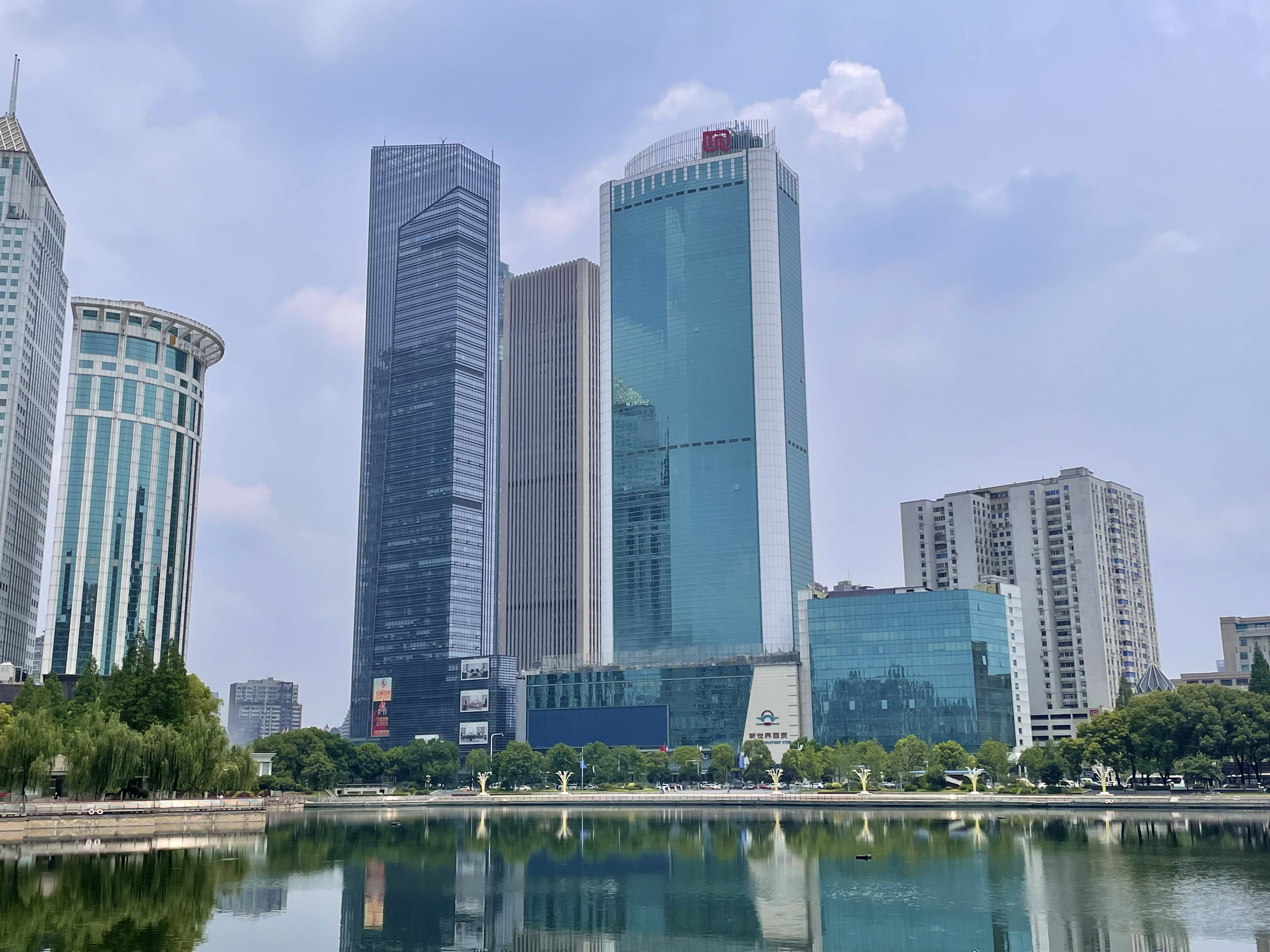
Wuhan New World International Trade Tower

Jianghan District is situated on the northwest (left) bank of the Yangtze River. It is both the least spacious and most densely populated of the districts of Wuhan. It borders Dongxihu to the north, Jiang'an to the northeast, Hanyang to the south, and Qiaokou to the west; on the opposite bank it borders Wuchang.

Wuhan Center and the Wuhan New International Trade Tower is located in Jianghan District, the latter of which houses the Consulate General of the United States and France in Wuhan, Hong Kong Economic and Trade Office in Wuhan, and offices of various international corporations.

== Administrative divisions ==
Jianghan District administers:

#	Name	Chinese (S)
Subdistricts
1	Minzu Subdistrict Nationalism	民族街道
2	Minquan Subdistrict Democracy	民权街道
3	Hualou Subdistrict Flower Tower	花楼街道
4	Shuita Subdistrict Water Pagoda	水塔街道
5	Manchun Subdistrict	满春街道
6	Qianjin Subdistrict Progress	前进街道
7	Minyi Subdistrict	民意街道
8	Xinhua Subdistrict New China	新华街道
9	Wansong Subdistrict Myriad Pines	万松街道
10	Beihu Subdistrict North Lake	北湖街道
11	Tangjiadun Subdistrict Tang Family Dun	唐家墩街道
12	Changqing Subdistrict	常青街道
13	Hanxing Subdistrict	汉兴街道
