= Shuita Subdistrict =

Shuita Subdistrict 水塔街道
- Subdistrict
- Location of Shuita Subdistrict in Hubei
- Coordinates: 30°34′53″N 114°16′58″E
- Country: China
- Province: Hubei
- Prefecture-level city: Wuhan
- District: Jianghan District
- Time zone: UTC+8 (China Standard)

Shuita Subdistrict (Chinese: 水塔街道; pinyin: Shuǐtǎ jiedao) is a subdistrict in Jianghan District, Wuhan, Hubei, China.
