= Xinhua Subdistrict, Jianghan District =

Xinhua Subdistrict 新华街道
- Subdistrict
- Location of Xinhua Subdistrict in Hubei
- Coordinates: 30°35′6″N 114°16′12″E
- Country: China
- Province: Hubei
- Prefecture-level city: Wuhan
- District: Jianghan District
- Time zone: UTC+8 (China Standard)

Xinhua Subdistrict (simplified Chinese: 新华街道; traditional Chinese: 新華街道; pinyin: Xīnhuá Jiēdào) is a subdistrict in Jianghan District, Wuhan, Hubei, China.
