= Wansong Subdistrict =

Wansong Subdistrict 万松街道
- Subdistrict
- Location of Wansong Subdistrict in Hubei
- Coordinates: 30°35′5″N 114°15′44″E
- Country: China
- Province: Hubei
- Prefecture-level city: Wuhan
- District: Jianghan District
- Time zone: UTC+8 (China Standard)

Wansong Subdistrict (simplified Chinese: 万松街道; traditional Chinese: 萬松街道; pinyin: Wànsong Jiēdào) is a subdistrict in Jianghan District, Wuhan, Hubei, China.
