= Hanxing Subdistrict =

Hanxing Subdistrict 汉兴街道
- Subdistrict
- Location of Hanxing Subdistrict in Hubei
- Coordinates: 30°38′4″N 114°15′28″E
- Country: China
- Province: Hubei
- Prefecture-level city: Wuhan
- District: Jianghan District
- Time zone: UTC+8 (China Standard)

Hanxing Subdistrict (Chinese: 汉兴街道; pinyin: Hanxing Jiēdào) is a subdistrict in Jianghan District, Wuhan, Hubei, China.
