= Beihu Subdistrict, Jianghan District =

Beihu Subdistrict 北湖街道
- Subdistrict
- Location of Beihu Subdistrict in Hubei
- Coordinates: 30°36′28″N 114°16′6″E
- Country: China
- Province: Hubei
- Prefecture-level city: Wuhan
- District: Jianghan District
- Time zone: UTC+8 (China Standard)

Beihu Subdistrict (Chinese: 北湖街道; pinyin: Beihu Jiēdào) is a subdistrict in Jianghan District, Wuhan, Hubei, China.
