= Gucheng County, Hubei =

Gucheng County 谷城县 Kucheng
- County
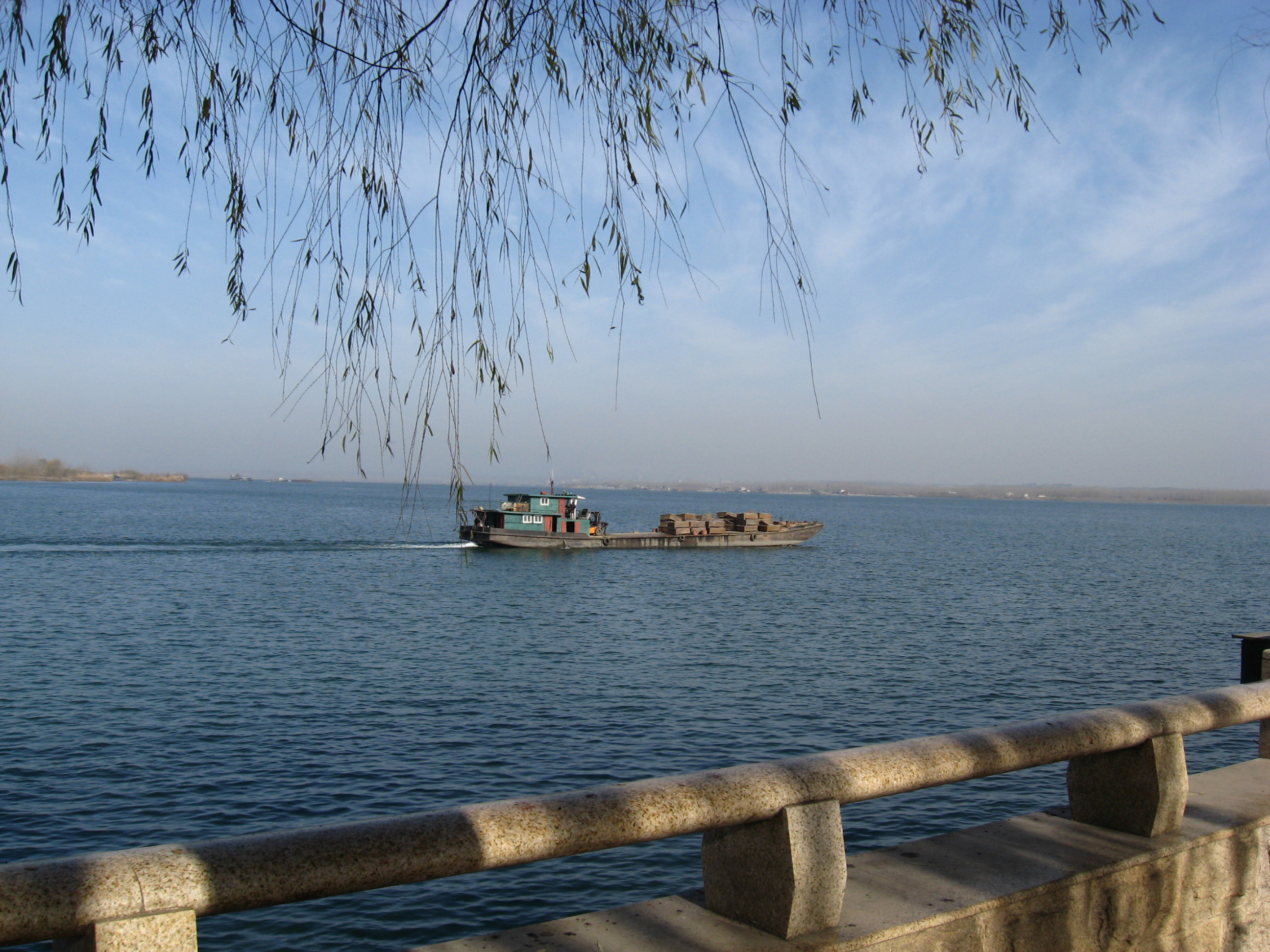
- Laohekou Binjiang Park (湖北老河口滨江公园)

- Location of the seat in Hubei
- Coordinates (Gucheng government): 32°15′50″N 111°39′11″E
- Country: People's Republic of China
- Province: Hubei
- Prefecture-level city: Xiangyang

Area
  - Total: 2,553 km^{2} (986 sq mi)
- Elevation: 86 m (282 ft)

Population (2020)
  - Total: 483,293
  - Density: 189.3/km^{2} (490.3/sq mi)
- Time zone: UTC+8 (China Standard)
- Website: hbgucheng.gov.cn

Gucheng County (simplified Chinese: 谷城县; traditional Chinese: 穀城縣; pinyin: Gǔchéng Xiàn) is a county of northwestern Hubei province, People's Republic of China, located in the eastern foothills of the Daba Mountains. It is under the administration of Xiangyang City, and is served by G70 Fuzhou–Yinchuan Expressway. As of 2004, it had a total population of 540,000 residing in an area of 2,552 square kilometres (985 sq mi).

== Administrative divisions ==
Nine towns:

- Chengguan (城关镇), Shihua (石花镇), Shengkang (盛𡐓镇/盛康镇), Miaotan (庙滩镇), Wushan (五山镇), Cihe (茨河镇), Nanhe (南河镇), Zijin (紫金镇), Lengji (冷集镇)

The only township is Zhaowan Township (赵湾乡)

Other areas:

- Xieshan Forestry Area (薤山林场)

== Climate ==
Climate data for Gucheng, elevation 120 m (390 ft), (1991–2020 normals, extremes 1977–present)
Month	Jan	Feb	Mar	Apr	May	Jun	Jul	Aug	Sep	Oct	Nov	Dec	Year
Record high °C (°F)	22.3 (72.1)	25.5 (77.9)	30.1 (86.2)	35.0 (95.0)	37.2 (99.0)	40.6 (105.1)	42.1 (107.8)	41.7 (107.1)	38.7 (101.7)	33.8 (92.8)	29.6 (85.3)	23.5 (74.3)	42.1 (107.8)
Mean daily maximum °C (°F)	7.9 (46.2)	11.2 (52.2)	16.5 (61.7)	23.1 (73.6)	27.8 (82.0)	31.1 (88.0)	32.7 (90.9)	31.9 (89.4)	28.1 (82.6)	23.0 (73.4)	16.5 (61.7)	10.2 (50.4)	21.7 (71.0)
Daily mean °C (°F)	3.2 (37.8)	6.0 (42.8)	10.9 (51.6)	17.0 (62.6)	22.0 (71.6)	25.8 (78.4)	27.8 (82.0)	27.1 (80.8)	22.8 (73.0)	17.1 (62.8)	10.7 (51.3)	5.3 (41.5)	16.3 (61.3)
Mean daily minimum °C (°F)	−0.2 (31.6)	2.1 (35.8)	6.5 (43.7)	12.2 (54.0)	17.2 (63.0)	21.5 (70.7)	24.2 (75.6)	23.7 (74.7)	18.9 (66.0)	12.9 (55.2)	6.5 (43.7)	1.8 (35.2)	12.3 (54.1)
Record low °C (°F)	−19.7 (−3.5)	−10.7 (12.7)	−5.5 (22.1)	−0.3 (31.5)	5.7 (42.3)	14.1 (57.4)	17.2 (63.0)	15.2 (59.4)	10.5 (50.9)	1.6 (34.9)	−3.2 (26.2)	−13.7 (7.3)	−19.7 (−3.5)
Average precipitation mm (inches)	26.8 (1.06)	26.9 (1.06)	54.9 (2.16)	69.4 (2.73)	103.8 (4.09)	104.3 (4.11)	121.7 (4.79)	129.7 (5.11)	59.9 (2.36)	66.6 (2.62)	43.5 (1.71)	19.3 (0.76)	826.8 (32.56)
Average precipitation days (≥ 0.1 mm)	6.4	7.5	9.1	9.5	11.3	10.5	11.6	12.2	11.3	10.1	8.4	6.0	113.9
Average snowy days	4.1	3.2	1.1	0	0	0	0	0	0	0	0.7	2.0	11.1
Average relative humidity (%)	73	72	71	71	71	75	80	81	77	74	74	72	74
Mean monthly sunshine hours	97.8	105.5	137.0	163.0	176.5	164.2	172.2	168.9	134.4	132.5	117.9	108.6	1,678.5
Percentage possible sunshine	31	33	37	42	41	39	40	41	37	38	38	35	38
Source: China Meteorological Administration all-time extreme temperature
