= List of Major National Historical and Cultural Sites in Hubei =

This list is of Major Sites Protected for their Historical and Cultural Value at the National Level in Hubei Province, China.

Site	Chinese name	Location	Designation	Image
Military Government of the Wuchang Uprising	Wuchang qiyi junzhengfu jiuzhi 武昌起义军政府旧址	Wuhan	1-7	Upload file
Golden Hall of Mount Wudang	Wudang Shan jindian 武当山金殿	Danjiangkou	1-94	Upload file
Jinancheng, capital of Chu	Chu Jinan gucheng 楚纪南故城	Jingzhou	1-147	Upload file
Site of the August 7 Conference	Baqi huiyi huizhi 八七会议会址	Wuhan	2-5	Upload file
Yuquan Temple and its Iron Pagoda	Yuquan si ji tieta 玉泉寺及铁塔	Dangyang	2-17	Upload file
Zixiao Palace	Zixiao gong 紫霄宫	32°25′36″N 111°01′21″E Danjiangkou	2-25	Upload file
Tonglüshan ancient copper mine	Tonglüshan gu tongkuang yizhi 铜绿山古铜矿遗址	Daye	2-51	Upload file
Tomb of Li Shizhen	Li Shizhen mu 李时珍墓	Qichun County	2-59	Upload file
Site of the Battle of Tingsiqiao during the Northern Expedition	Beifa Tingsi qiao zhanyi yizhi 北伐汀泗桥战役遗址	Xianning	3-23	Upload file
Qiliping revolutionary sites	Hong'an Qiliping geming jiuzhi 红安七里坪革命旧址	Hong'an County	3-24	Upload file
Hunan-West Hubei Revolutionary Base	Xiang E xi geming genjudi jiuzhi 湘鄂西革命根据地旧址	Honghu	3-30	Upload file
Zhishi Xuanyue Paifang	"Zhishi Xuanyue" paifang “治世玄岳”牌坊	Danjiangkou	3-101	Upload file
Duobao Pagoda of the Guangde Temple	Guangde si Duobao ta 广德寺多宝塔	Xiangyang	3-156	Upload file
Rock Carvings of the Yiting Pavilion	Yitingming moya shike 怡亭铭摩崖石刻	Ezhou	3-175	Upload file
Qujialing site	Qujialing yizhi 屈家岭遗址	Jingshan County	3-194	Upload file
Panlongcheng	Panlongcheng yizhi 盘龙城遗址	31°40′30″N 114°15′50″E Wuhan	3-199	Upload file
Balingshan tombs	Baling shan gu muqun 八岭山古墓群	Jingzhou	3-230	Upload file
Leigudun tombs	Leigudun gumuqun 擂鼓墩古墓群	Suizhou	3-231	Upload file
Xianling Mausoleum	Ming Xianling 明显陵	Zhongxiang	3-253	Upload file
Tomb of Li Zicheng	Li Zicheng mu 李自成墓	Tongshan County	3-255	Upload file
Jigongshan site	Jigongshan yizhi 鸡公山遗址	Jingzhou	4-3	Upload file
Shijiahe site	Shijiahe yizhi 石家河遗址	Tianmen	4-15	Upload file
Diaolongbei site	Diaolongbei yuzhi 雕龙碑遗址	Zaoyang	4-16	Upload file
Jishan Chu Tombs	Jishan Chu muqun 纪山楚墓群	Shayang County	4-60	Upload file
Nanyan Palace	Nanyan gong 南岩宫	Danjiangkou	4-123	Upload file
Ancient Longzhong	Xiangyang “Gulongzhong” 襄阳“古隆中”	Xiangyang	4-149	Upload file
Jingzhou City Wall	Jingzhou chengqiang 荆州城墙	Jingzhou	4-150	Upload file
Site of the Nationalist Government in Wuhan	Wuhan guomin zhengfu jiuzhi 武汉国民政府旧址	Wuhan	4-229	Upload file
Headquarters of the Fifth Division of the New Fourth Army	Xinsijun wushi silingbu jiuzhi 新四军五师司令部旧址	Dawu County	4-245	Upload file
Xuetangliangzi site	Xuetangliangzi yizhi 学堂梁子遗址	Yun County	5-79	Upload file
Guanmiaoshan site	Guanmiaoshan yizhi 关庙山遗址	Zhijiang	5-80	Upload file
Menbanwan site	Menbanwan yizhi 门板湾遗址	Yingcheng	5-81	Upload file
Zoumaling site	Zoumaling yizhi 走马岭遗址	Shishou	5-82	Upload file
Yinxiangcheng site	Yinxiangcheng yizhi 阴湘城遗址	Jingzhou	5-83	Upload file
Mopanshan site	Mopanshan yizhi 磨盘山遗址	Dangyang	5-84	Upload file
Longwan site	Longwan yizhi 龙湾遗址	Qianjiang	5-85	Upload file
Ewangcheng ruins	E wangcheng yizhi 鄂王城城址	Daye	5-86	Upload file
Jijiahu ruins	Jijiahu chengzhi 季家湖城址	Dangyang	5-87	Upload file
Chuhuangcheng ruins	Chuhuangcheng chengzhi 楚皇城城址	Yicheng 宜城市	5-88	Upload file
Husi Kiln Sites	Husi ciyao zhiqun 湖泗瓷窑址群	Wuhan	5-89	Upload file
Yuxu Palace	Yuxu gong yizhi 玉虚宫遗址	Danjiangkou	5-90	Upload file
Tombs of Ming Princes of Chu	Ming Chu wang mu 明楚王墓	Wuhan	5-175	Upload file
Sizu Temple Pagoda	Sizu si ta 四祖寺塔	Huangmei County	5-359	Upload file
Old Architecture of Dashuijing	Dashuijing gu jianzhuqun 大水井古建筑群	Lichuan	5-360	Upload file
Xiangyang City Wall	Xiangyang chengqiang 襄阳城墙	Xiangyang	5-361	Upload file
Green Shield Wall of the Prince of Xiangyang Palace	Xiangyang wangfu lüyingbi 襄阳王府绿影壁	Xiangyang	5-362	Upload file
Longgang Revolutionary Site	Longgang geming jiuzhi 龙港革命旧址	Yangxin County	5-493	Upload file
Wuhan Peasant Movement School	Wuhan nongmin yundong jiangxisuo jiuzhi 武汉农民运动讲习所旧址	Wuhan	5-494	Upload file
Dazhimen Station	Dazhimen huochezhan 大智门火车站	Wuhan	5-495	Upload file
Hankow Customs House	Jianghanguan dalou 江汉关大楼	Wuhan	5-496	Upload file
Early Architecture of Wuhan University	Wuhan daxue zaoqi jianzhu 武汉大学早期建筑	30°32′27″N 114°21′40″E Wuhan	5-497	Upload file
Former Residence of Zhan Tianyou	Zhan Tianyou guju 詹天佑故居	Wuhan	5-498	Upload file
Jianshi Man site	Jianshi zhiliren yizhi 建始直立人遗址	Jianshi County	6-157	Upload file
Majiayuan site	Majiayuan yizhi 马家垸遗址	Shayang County	6-158	Upload file
Taojiahu site	Taojiahu yizhi 陶家湖遗址	Yingcheng	6-159	Upload file
Jimingcheng ruins	Jimingcheng yizhi 鸡鸣城遗址	Gong'an County	6-160	Upload file
Ruins of the capital of Deng	Deng guo guzhi 邓国故址	Xiangyang	6-161	Upload file
Ruins of Shizhou	Shizhou chengzhi 施州城址	Enshi	6-162	Upload file
Tangya Tusi City	Tangya tusi chengzhi 唐崖土司城址	Xianfeng County	6-163	Upload file
Rongmei Tusi Site	Rongmei tusi yizhi 容美土司遗址	Hefeng County	6-164	Upload file
Qingshan Tombs	Qingshan muqun 青山墓群	Zhijiang	6-268	Upload file
Jiuliandun Tombs	Jiuliandun muqun 九连墩墓群	Zaoyang	6-269	Upload file
Mausoleum of Guan Yu	Guanling 关陵	Dangyang	6-270	Upload file
Baizi Pagoda	Baizi ta 柏子塔	Macheng	6-657	Upload file
Wuzu Temple	Wuzu si 五祖寺	Huangmei County	6-658	Upload file
Ezhou Guanyin Pavilion	Ezhou Guanyin ge 鄂州观音阁	Ezhou	6-659	Upload file
Yumuzhai	Yumuzhai 鱼木寨	Lichuan	6-660	Upload file
Three Temples of Jingzhou	Jingzhou sanguan 荆州三观	Jingzhou	6-661	Upload file
Jingzhou Wanshou Pagoda	Jingzhou wanshou baota 荆州万寿宝塔	Jingzhou	6-662	Upload file
Huangling Temple	Huangling miao 黄陵庙	Yichang	6-663	Upload file
Cihe Cheng'en Temple	Cihe Cheng'en si 茨河承恩寺	Gucheng County	6-664	Upload file
Zhongxiang Wenfeng Pagoda	Zhongxiang Wenfeng ta 钟祥文风塔	Zhongxiang	6-665	Upload file
Architecture of Wudang Mountains	Wudang Shan jianzhuqun 武当山建筑群	32°24′03″N 111°00′14″E Shiyan	6-666	Upload file
Old Architecture of Fenghuangshan	Fenghuang Shan gu jianzhuqun 凤凰山古建筑群	Zigui County	6-667	Upload file
Migong Temple	Migong ci 米公祠	Xiangyang	6-668	Upload file
Wu Family Hall in Doushan	Doushan Wu shi ci 陡山吴氏祠	Hong'an County	6-669	Upload file
Rock inscriptions of the Sanyou Cave	Sanyoudong moya 三游洞摩崖	Yichang	6-844	Upload file
Xianfo Temple Grottoes	Xian Fosi shiku 仙佛寺石窟	Laifeng County	6-845	Upload file
Dongpo Chibi	Dongpo chibi 东坡赤壁	Huanggang	6-846	Upload file
Caihuangmu inscriptions of Cixiaogou	Cixiaogou “Caihuangmu” moya 慈孝沟“采皇木”摩崖	Zhuxi County	6-847	Upload file
Former Residence of Li Xiannian	Li Xiannian guju 李先念故居	Hong'an County	6-992	Upload file
Former Residence of Dong Biwu	Dong Biwu guju 董必武故居	Hong'an County	6-993	Upload file
Modern Architecture of Hankou	Hankou jindai jianzhuqun 汉口近代建筑群	Wuhan	6-994	Upload file
Former Residence and Tomb of Yang Shoujing	Yang Shoujing guju he mu 杨守敬故居和墓	Yidu	6-995	Upload file
Hanyeping Iron and Coal Mines and Factory	Hanyeping meitie changkuang jiuzhi 汉冶萍煤铁厂矿旧址	Huangshi	6-996	Upload file
All-China Federation of Trade Unions in Hankou	Hankou Zhonghua quanguo zonggonghui jiuzhi 汉口中华全国总工会旧址	Wuhan	6-997	Upload file
Site of the Daye Soldiers Revolt	Daye bingbao jiuzhi 大冶兵暴旧址	Daye	6-998	Upload file
Red Third Army Revolutionary Site	Hongsan juntuan geming jiuzhi 红三军团革命旧址	Daye	6-999	Upload file
Wuliping Revolutionary Site	Wuliping geming jiuzhi 五里坪革命旧址	Hefeng County	6-1000	Upload file
Zhongyuan Military Region site	Zhongyuan junqu jiuzhi 中原军区旧址	Dawu County	6-1001	Upload file
Jingjiang Sluice Gates	Jingjiang fenhongzha 荆江分洪闸	Gong'an County	6-1002	Upload file
New Fourth Army Headquarters in Hankou	汉口新四军军部旧址	Wuhan	7-1809-5-202	Upload file
Yuji Palace	禹稷行宫	Wuhan	7-1218	Upload file

== See also ==
- Principles for the Conservation of Heritage Sites in China
