= Xiushui =

Xiushui may refer to several places:

== China ==
- Xiushui County (修水县), of Jiujiang, Jiangxi
- Xiushui River, in Jiangxi
- Xiushui Street (秀水街), in Beijing

Towns (秀水镇)

- Xiushui, Lechang, Guangdong
- Xiushui, Yushu, Jilin
- Xiushui, Yu County, Shanxi
- Xiushui, An County, Sichuan

Townships (秀水鄉)

- Xiushui, Weining County, in Weining Yi Autonomous County, Guizhou

== Taiwan ==
- Xiushui, Changhua, a rural township in Changhua County
