= Huangmei =

Huangmei may refer to:

- Huangmei County (黄梅县), Huanggang, Hubei, China
- Huangmei opera, Chinese opera originating from Anhui
- Huangmei, Huangmei County (黄梅镇), a town in Huangmei County, Huanggang, Hubei, China
