= Wuzu Temple =

Buddhist temple in Hubei, China

- 五祖寺
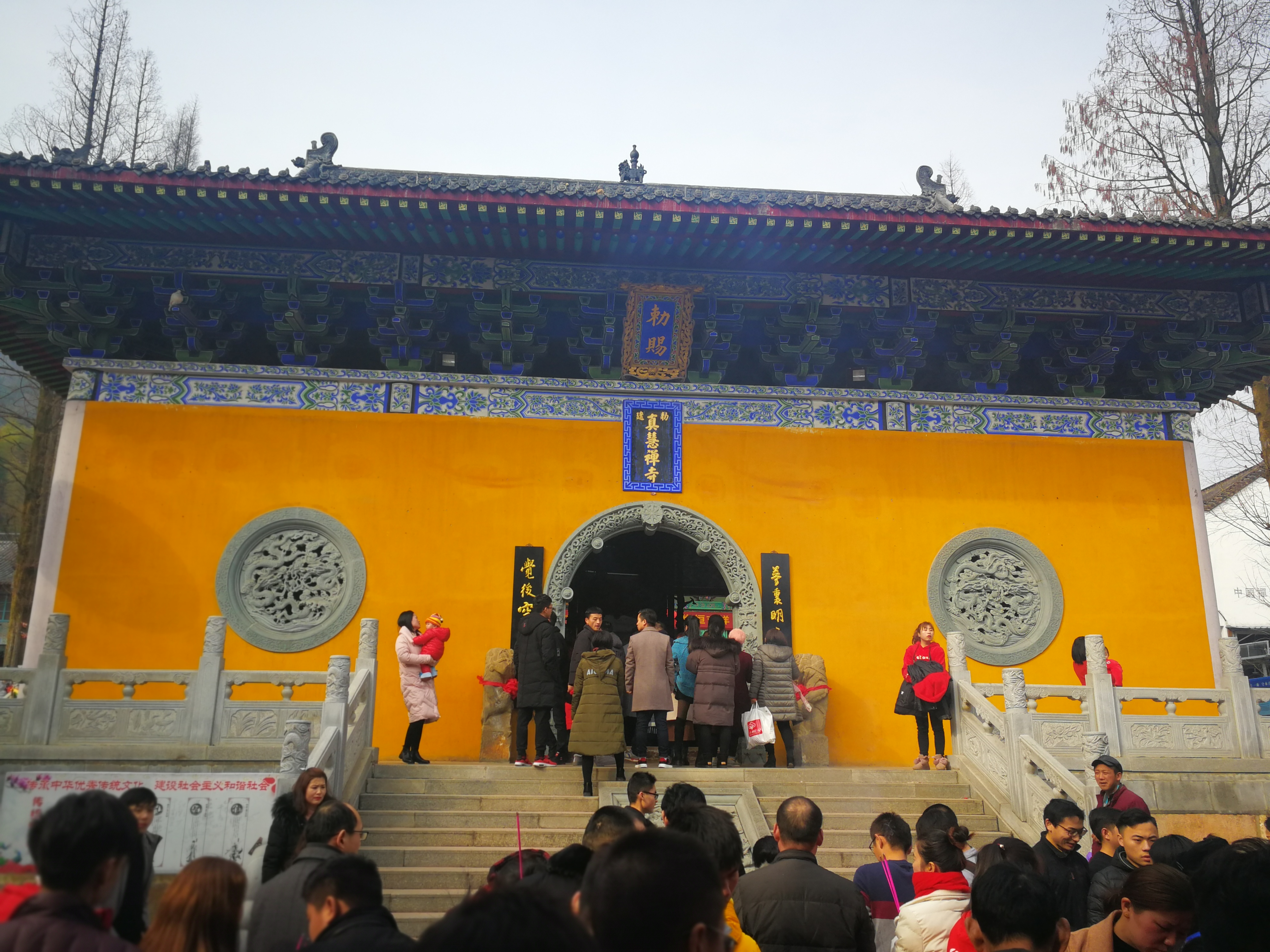
- A hall at Wuzu Temple.

- Location within Hubei

Religion
- Affiliation: Buddhism
- Sect: Chan Buddhism
- Leadership: Shi Weidao (释惟道)

Location
- Location: Wuzu Town, Huangmei County, Hubei
- Country: China
- Coordinates: 30°11′28″N 115°56′52″E

Architecture
- Style: Chinese architecture
- Founder: Daman Hongren
- Established: 654
- Completed: Qing dynasty (reconstruction)

Wuzu Temple (Chinese: 五祖寺; pinyin: Wǔzǔ Sì; lit. 'Temple of the 5th Patriarch') is a Buddhist temple located on the Eastern Mountain, in Wuzu Town of Huangmei County, Hubei, China.

== History ==
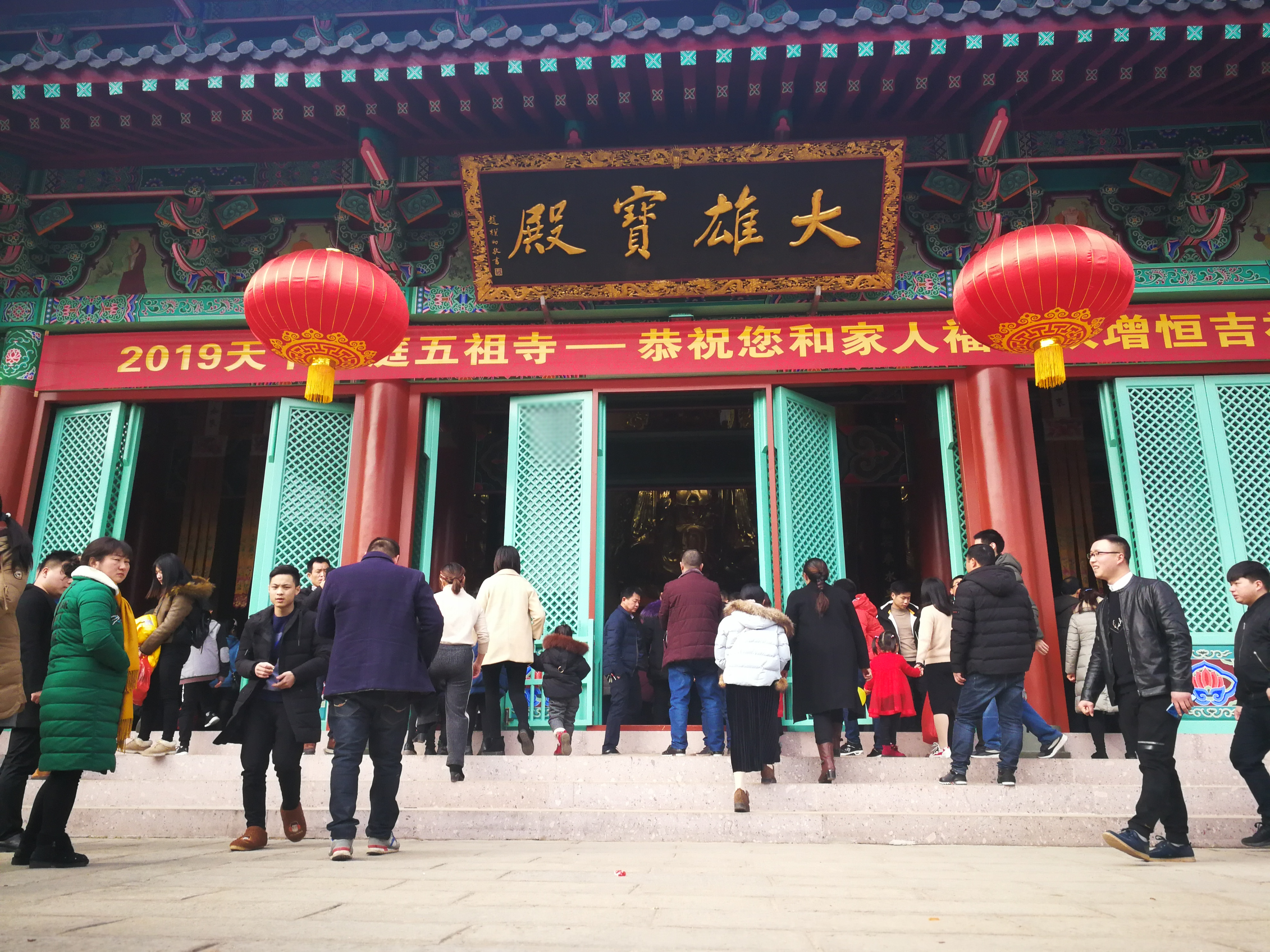
The Mahavira Hall at Wuzu Temple.

=== Tang dynasty ===
Wuzu Temple was first built in 654 with the name of Dongshan Temple (东山寺; 'Eastern Mountain Temple'). During the Tang dynasty (618–907), Abbot Daman Hongren, an eminent monk of Chan Buddhism, promulgated Buddhist doctrines for decades. His disciples includes Huineng, Shenxiu, and Faru.

In 848, Emperor Xuanzong named it "Dazhong Dongshan Temple" (大中东山寺; 'Great Central Eastern Mountain Temple').

=== Song dynasty ===
In the Song dynasty (960–1279), Shijie (师戒), Fayan (法演), Biaozi (表自) and Zongba (宗拔) successively served as abbot of the temple. While Fayan settled at the temple, it had reached unprecedented heyday, his disciples Yuanwu Keqin, Fojian Huiqin and Foyan Qingyuan were hailed as "Three luminaries" or "Three Buddhas".

During the Jingde period (1004–1007), Emperor Zhenzong inscribed and honored the name of "Zhen Hui Chan Temple" (真慧禅寺).

After the fall of the Song dynasty, Wuzu Temple was completely destroyed by fire during the Mongolian invasion of the 13th century.

=== Yuan dynasty ===
In 1282, at the dawn of the Yuan dynasty (1271–1368), master Liaoxing (了行) restored and redecorated the temple.

In 1313, the mummy of Daman Hongren was brought back and enshrined in the temple.

In 1322, master Fashi (法式) supervised the construction of the temple. Mahavira Hall and Buddhist Texts Library were added to the temple.

In 1331, Emperor Wenzong inscribed and honored the name of "Dongshan Wuzu Temple" (东山五祖寺; 'Eastern Mountain Temple of the 5th Patriarch'), commonly abbreviated as "Wuzu Temple" (五祖寺; 'Temple of the 5th Patriarch'), the name has been used to date.

=== Republic of China ===
In 1927, more than 2,000 soldiers of Huangmei County set a fire to demolish two thirds of its buildings.

=== People's Republic of China ===
During the ten-year Cultural Revolution the Red Guards had attacked the temple, Four Heavenly Kings Hall, Bell tower and Drum tower were badly damaged in the movement.

Wuzu Temple has been designated as a National Key Buddhist Temple in Han Chinese Area by the State Council of China in 1983.

In May 2006, was listed among the sixth group of "Major National Historical and Cultural Sites in Hubei" by the State Council of China.

== Architecture ==
The grand complex is built along the up and down of mountains and divided into three countyards. Along the central axis are the Shanmen, Four Heavenly Kings Hall, Mahavira Hall, Pilu Hall, Body Hall and Buddhist Texts Library.

=== Mahavira Hall ===
Behind the Four Heavenly Kings Hall is the Mahavira Hall enshrining the statues of Sakyamuni, Amitabha and Bhaisajyaguru. The statues of Eighteen Arhats stand on both sides of the hall. It was originally built in 1986 and was renovated in 1986. Covering a building area of 865.7 square metres (9,318 sq ft), it is the largest Mahavira Hall in South Central China. Under the eaves is a plaque with the Chinese characters "Mahavira Hall" written by former Venerable Master of the Buddhist Association of China Zhao Puchu.

=== Body Hall ===
The Body Hall preserves the mummy of Daman Hongren; it still maintains the architectural style of the Qing dynasty (1644–1911).

== See also ==
- Tingqian town
