= Longgan Lake =

Lake of China

- Location in Hubei
- Location: Susong County, Anhui; Huangmei County, Hubei
- Coordinates: 29°55′47″N 116°05′39″E
- Basin countries: China
- Max. length: 29.5 km (18 mi)
- Max. width: 21.1 km (13 mi)
- Surface area: 316.2 km^{2} (100 sq mi)
- Average depth: 3.78 m (12 ft)
- Max. depth: 4.58 m (15 ft)
- Water volume: 1,196×10^{6} m^{3} (42.2×10^{9} cu ft)
- Surface elevation: 15 m (49 ft)

Longgan Lake (simplified Chinese: 龙感湖; traditional Chinese: 龍感湖; pinyin: Lónggǎn Hú) is a freshwater lake in central China, divided between Susong County of Anhui Province and Huangmei County at the eastern extremity of Hubei Province. The lake is situated near the north bank of the middle reaches of Yangtze River, opposite Poyang Lake (which is south of the Yangtze). The lake was named Longgan Lake in a 1955 decision which combined the names of two former lakes, Long Lake (龙湖) and Gan Lake (感湖).

As of 1998, the lake's water surface area was 316.2 square kilometres (100 sq mi). It is an important marsh protective area. Longgan Lake is an important aquatic farming area.

== Geography ==
=== Administrative Divisions ===
The western shore of Longgan Lake is in Huanggang; the area is administered under the Longganhu Administrative District (total area: 100 km^{2}). Longganhu Administrative District administers:

#	Name	Chinese (S)
Management Offices
1	Luchaihu	芦柴湖办事处
2	Yanghu	洋湖办事处
3	Shahu	沙湖办事处
4	Chungang	春港办事处
5	Saihu	塞湖办事处
6	Qingnihu	青泥湖办事处
7	Yanjiazha	严家闸办事处
Other Areas
8	Longganhu Industrial Park	湖北龙感湖工业园区
