= Zhuogang =

Zhuogang 濯港镇
- Town
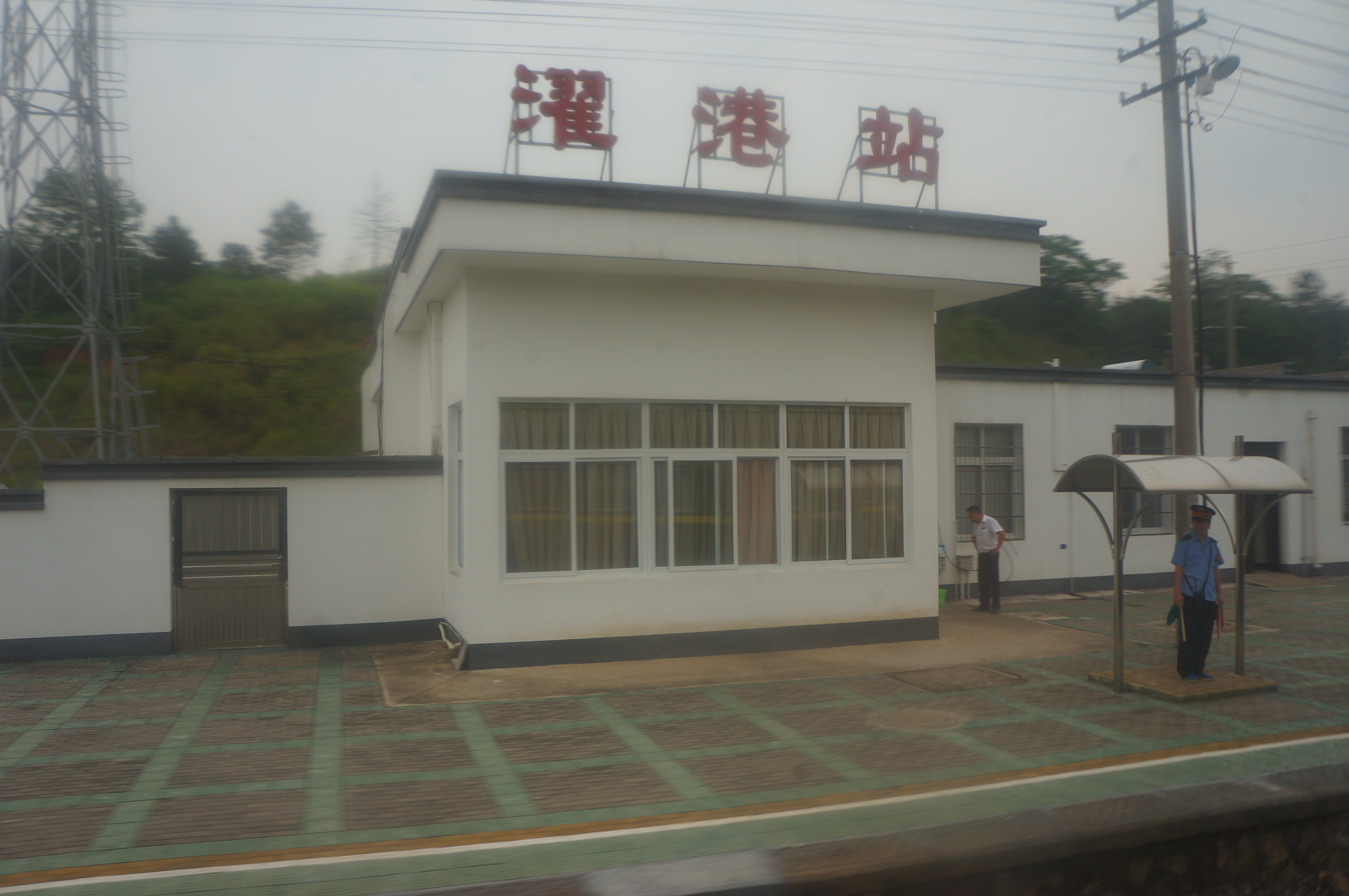
- Zhuogang station

- Location in Hubei
- Coordinates: 30°0′35″N 115°53′5″E
- Country: People's Republic of China
- Province: Hubei
- Prefecture-level city: Huanggang
- County: Huangmei County
- Time zone: UTC+8 (China Standard)

Zhuogang (Chinese: 濯港; pinyin: Zhuógǎng) is a town under the administration of Huangmei County, Hubei, China. As of 2020, it administers five residential communities and 41 villages:

- Zhuogang Community
- Caiyun Community (蔡运社区)
- Zhengjie Community (正街社区)
- Yueguang Community (悦光社区)
- Guidun Community (桂墩社区)
- Shilipu Village (十里铺村)
- Zhangshangwu Village (张上屋村)
- Caiwan Village (蔡塆村)
- Fengshuling Village (枫树岭村)
- Fanwan Village (樊塆村)
- Zhangdian Village (张店村)
- Hongtupu Village (洪屠铺村)
- Hongwan Village (洪塆村)
- Lilong Village (李垄村)
- Bamaoshan Village (芭茅山村)
- Yanfan Village (严畈村)
- Liuwan Village (刘塆村)
- Huangzhulin Village (黄竹林村)
- Chengguang Village (程光村)
- Liugeng Village (柳埂村)
- Wuju Village (吴咀村)
- Wuyuanba Village (吴元八村)
- Chashanju Village (茶山咀村)
- Hupai Village (胡牌村)
- Gaoqiao Village (高桥村)
- Wangzhongshi Village (王仲世村)
- Langkou Village (浪口村)
- Lilinju Village (栗林咀村)
- Yushixian Village (余世显村)
- Huliuqiao Village (胡六桥村)
- Wushapo Village (五沙坡村)
- Yangliuhu Village (杨柳湖村)
- Xiawei Village (夏圩村)
- Baihudu Village (白湖渡村)
- Jiangju Village (蒋咀村)
- Zhangcheng Village (张城村)
- Xumi Village (徐密村)
- Taohe Village (陶河村)
- Chenzhongfan Village (陈中畈村)
- Liuwei Village (刘圩村)
- Huba Village (胡坝村)
- Guiba Village (桂坝村)
- Dingzijie Village (丁字街村)
- Zhongluwan Village (中路塆村)
- Fengniu Village (冯牛村)
- Xuyu Village (徐郁村)
