= Poyang Lake Dam =

- Location within China
- Official name: 鄱阳湖水利枢纽工程
- Location: Jiujiang, Jiangxi, China
- Coordinates: 29°31′32″N 116°07′21″E
- Status: Proposed

Reservoir
- Total capacity: 20,000,000,000 m^{3} (16,000,000 acre⋅ft)

Power Station
- Turbines: 8 x 11.5 MW bulb
- Installed capacity: 92 MW

The Poyang Lake Dam, referred to as the Poyang Lake Water Conservancy Project, is dam proposed to maintain water levels at Poyang Lake in Jiangxi Province, China. The lake is China's largest freshwater resource but has significantly decreased in size during the 21st century due to heavy damming, drought and dredging. Construction of the dam can also cause severe damages on remnant population of finless porpoises.
