= Poyang Lake =

Largest freshwater lake in China, located in Jiangxi Province

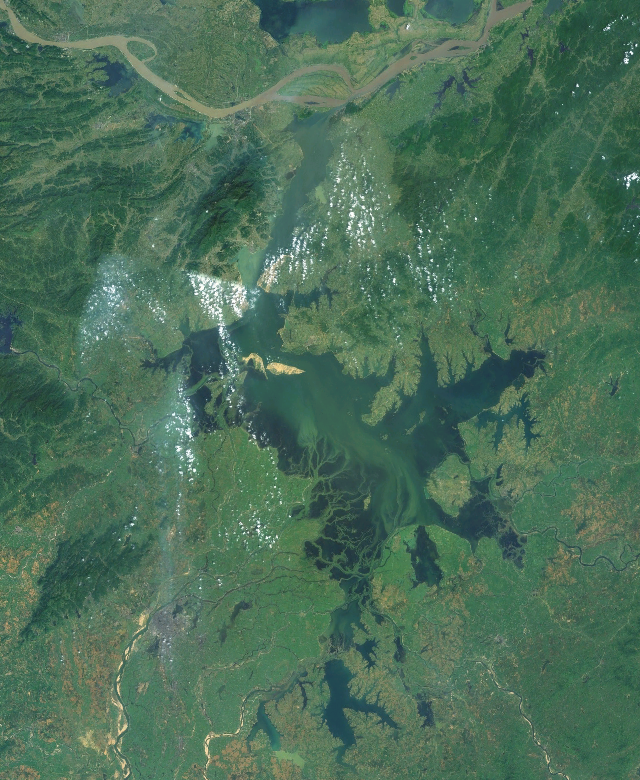
- Satellite image of Lake Poyang

- Location within China
- Location: Jiujiang, China
- Coordinates: 29°05′N 116°17′E
- Primary inflows: 5 rivers, primarily the Gan and Xiu
- Catchment area: 162,225 square kilometers (62,635 mi^{2})
- Basin countries: China
- Max. length: 170 kilometers (110 mi)
- Max. width: 17 kilometers (11 mi)
- Surface area: 3,210 square kilometers (1,240 mi^{2})
- Average depth: 8.4 meters (28 ft)
- Max. depth: 25.1 meters (82 ft)
- Water volume: 25.2 cubic kilometers (6.0 mi^{3})
- Residence time: 0.173 years
- Shore length^{1}: 1,200 kilometers (750 mi)
- Surface elevation: 16.5 meters (54 ft)

Ramsar Wetland
- Official name: Poyanghu
- Designated: 31 March 1992
- Reference no.: 550
- ^{1} Shore length is not a well-defined measure.

Poyang Lake
- Traditional Chinese: 鄱陽湖
- Simplified Chinese: 鄱阳湖
- Literal meaning: Lake North of Po
Transcriptions
Standard Mandarin
- Hanyu Pinyin: Póyáng Hú
- Wade–Giles: P'o-yang Hu
Gan
- Romanization: Po-yong U

Poyang Lake is the largest freshwater lake in China. Located within Jiujiang Prefecture in Jiangxi Province, it is fed by the Gan, Xin, and Xiu rivers and flows northward into the Yangtze River through a channel.

The area of Poyang Lake fluctuates dramatically between the wet and dry seasons, but in recent years the size of the lake has been decreasing overall. In a normal year the area of the lake averages 3,500 square kilometers (1,400 mi^{2}). In early 2012, drought, sand quarrying, and the practice of storing water at the Three Gorges Dam lowered the area of the lake to about 200 square kilometers (77 mi^{2}).

The lake provides a habitat for half a million migratory birds and is a favorite destination for birding. During the winter, the lake becomes home to many migrating Siberian cranes, up to 90% of this critically endangered species spend the winter there.

== Formation ==
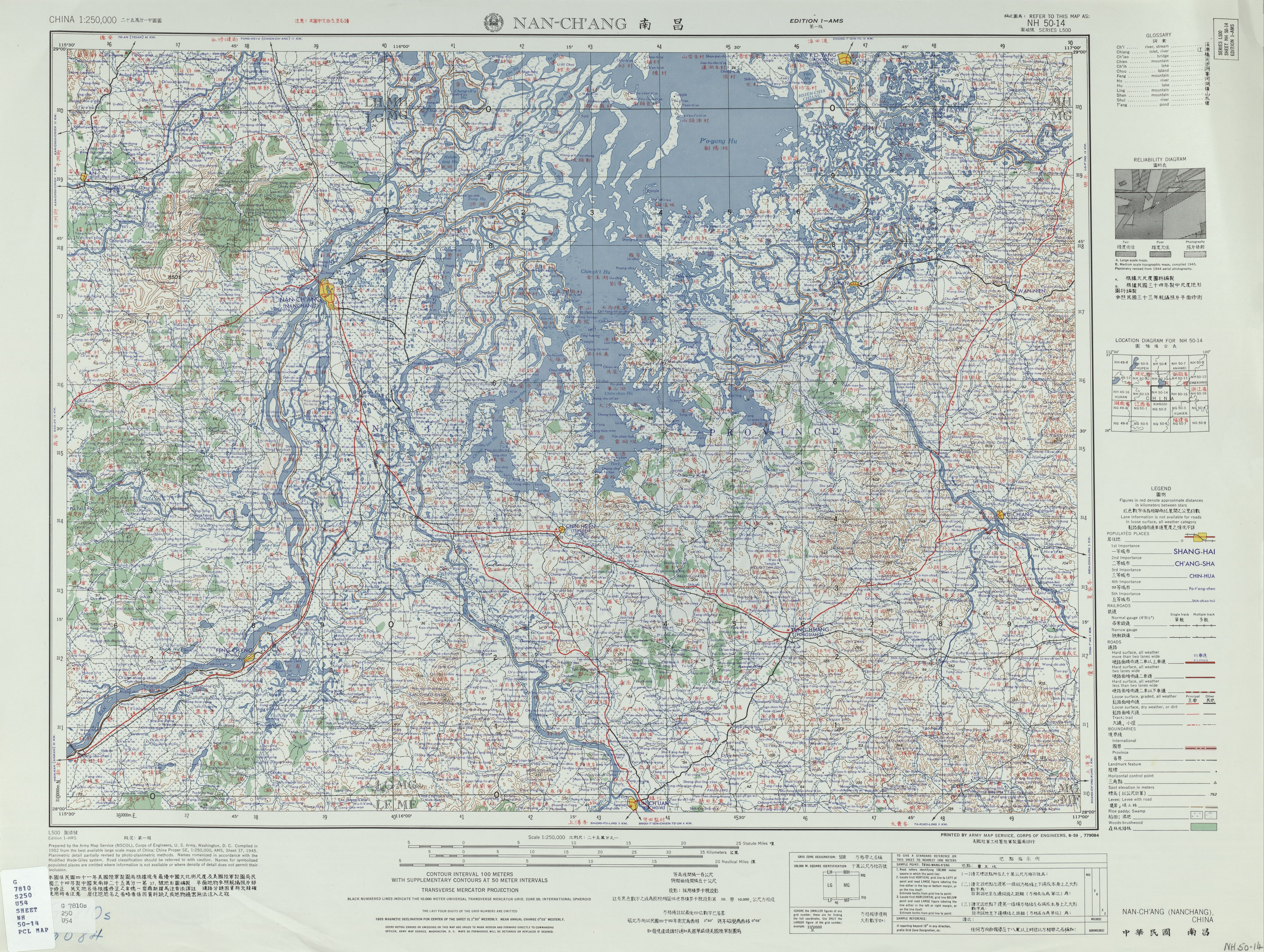
Map including Poyang Lake (labeled as P'o-yang Hu 鄱陽湖) (AMS, 1952)

Poyang Lake has also been called Pengli Lake (彭蠡澤) historically, but they are not the same. Before the Han dynasty, the Yangtze followed a more northerly course through what is now Longgan Lake; Pengli Marsh formed the lower reaches of the Gan River. The area that is now Poyang Lake was a plain along the Gan River. Around AD 400, the new more southerly course of the Yangtze River switched again, causing the Gan River to further back up and form Lake Poyang. The lake was named for Poyang County, which it flooded along with Haihun County, forcing a mass migration to Wucheng Township in what is now Yongxiu County. Wucheng thus became one of the great ancient townships of Jiangxi Province. This migration gave birth to the Chinese idiom, "Drowning Haihun County gives rise to Wucheng Township" (Chinese: 淹了海昏縣，出了吳城鎭). Poyang was named for the earlier Po County of the Qin dynasty, in turn named for the city of Poyi (番邑) in the state of Chu.

Lake Poyang reached its greatest size during the Tang dynasty, when its area reached 6,000 square kilometers (2,300 mi^{2}).

== Environmental issues ==
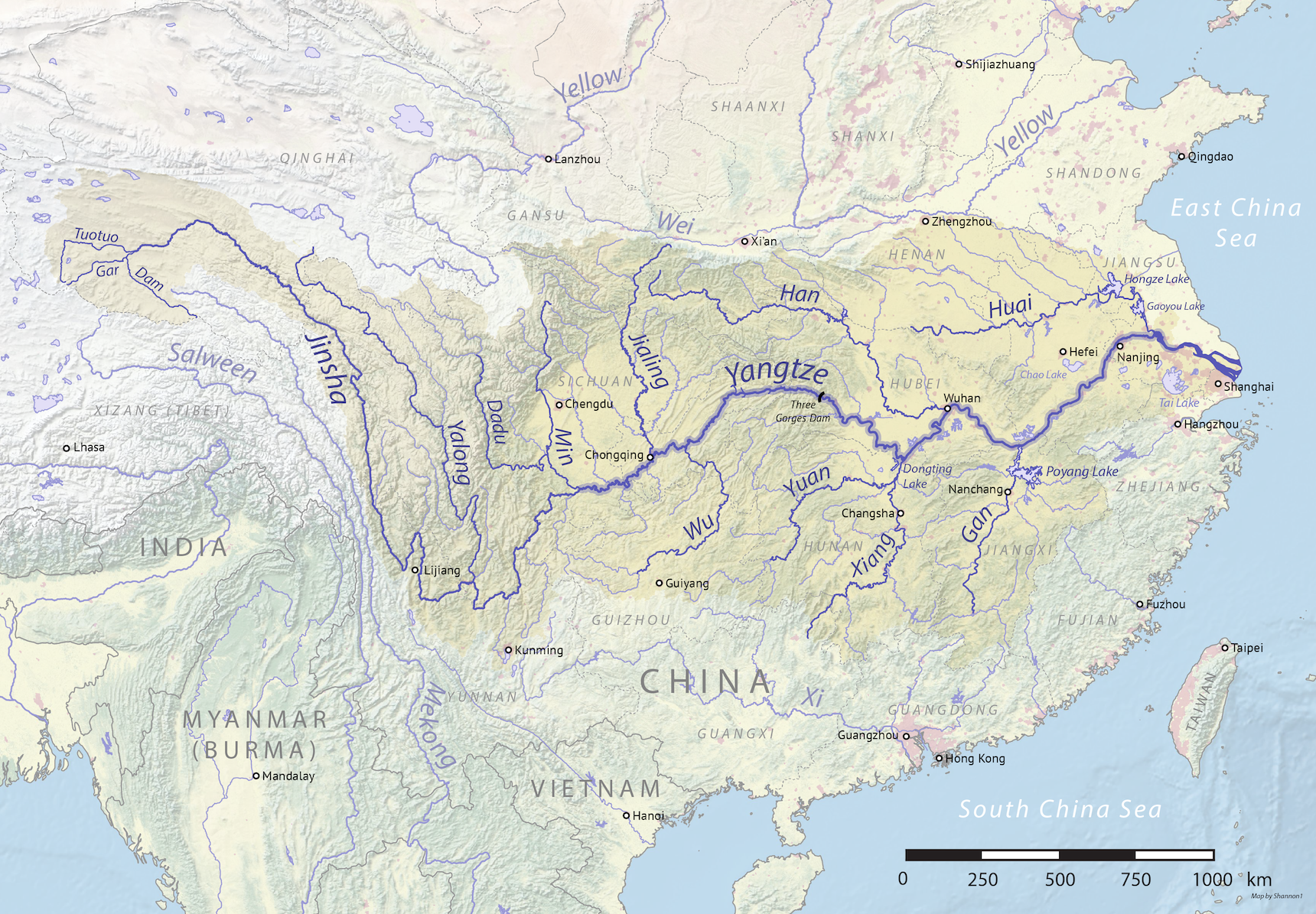
Yangtze River drainage basin, including Poayang Lake Location

=== Loss of wildlife ===
A fishing ban has been in place since 2002. In January 2020, China imposed a 10-year fishing moratorium on 332 sites along the Yangtze, including Poyang Lake to protect marine biodiversity.

In 2007 fears were expressed that China's finless porpoise, locally known as the jiangzhu ("river pig"), a native of the lake along with other waters such as Dongting Lake, might follow the baiji, the Yangtze river dolphin, into extinction. Calls have been made for action to be taken to save the porpoise, of which there are about 1,400 left, with between 700 and 900 in the Yangtze, and another about 500 in Poyang and Dongting Lakes. 2007 population levels are less than half the 1997 levels, and the population is dropping at a rate of 7.3 percent per year.

Sand dredging has become a mainstay of local economic development in the last few years, and is an important source of revenue in the region that borders Poyang Lake. But at the same time, high-density dredging projects have been the principal cause of the death of the local wildlife population. Dredging makes the waters of the lake muddier, and the porpoises cannot see as far as they once could, and have to rely on their highly developed sonar systems to avoid obstacles and look for food. Large ships enter and leave the lake at the rate of two per minute and such a high density of shipping means the porpoises have difficulty hearing their food, and also cannot swim freely from one bank to the other.

Furthermore, construction of Poyang Lake Dam is expected to cause devastating effects on the remaining porpoises.

=== Shrinkage ===
Due to the Three Gorges Dam upriver on the Yangtze river, Poyang Lake can seasonally shrink and dry up.

In 2012, the lake nearly dried up completely. 200 square kilometers (77 sq mi) of land was underwater in October, while the lake is normally 3,500 square kilometers (1,400 sq mi) in area when full. In addition to the Three Gorges Dam, which must store water in its reservoir to be usable in winter, a drought was also blamed for the shrinkage.

The Jiangxi local government has proposed to build the Poyang Lake Dam to maintain water levels in the lake, building a sluice wall across the connection between the lake and the Yangtze river. An environmental impact assessment is pending. Scientists and environmental groups such as the World Wide Fund for Nature, have criticized the proposal, arguing that artificially engineering water levels in the lake will adversely affect wildlife diversity.

=== Conservation efforts ===
In 2019, Conservation International China began work in the Poyang Lake basin applying the Freshwater Health Index approach to identify challenges and prioritize actions for wetland ecosystem protection and sustainable resource use.

== In history ==
In 1363, the Battle of Lake Poyang took place there; the battle is claimed to be the largest naval battle in history.

== Gallery ==
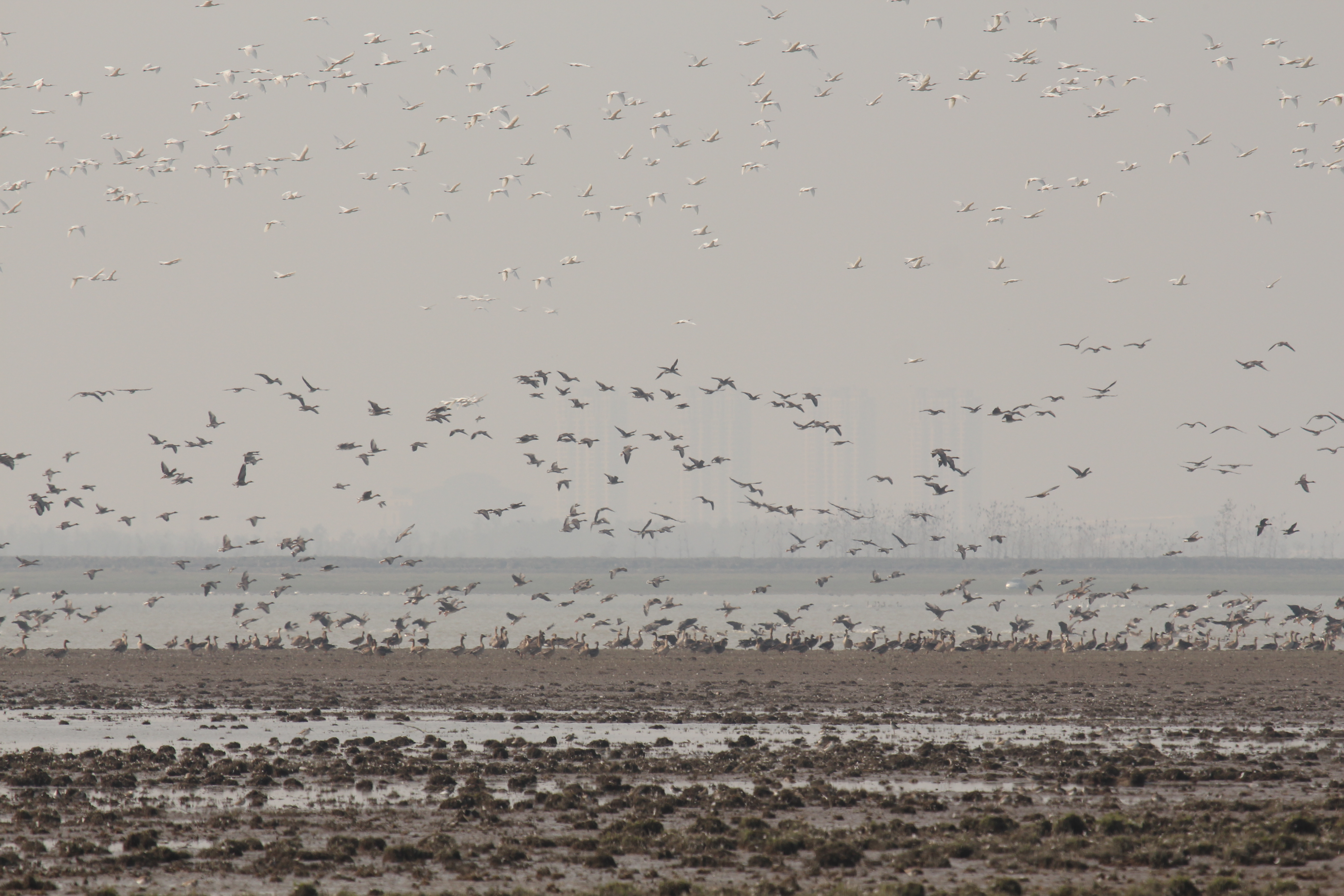
Birds at Poyang Lake, 2014

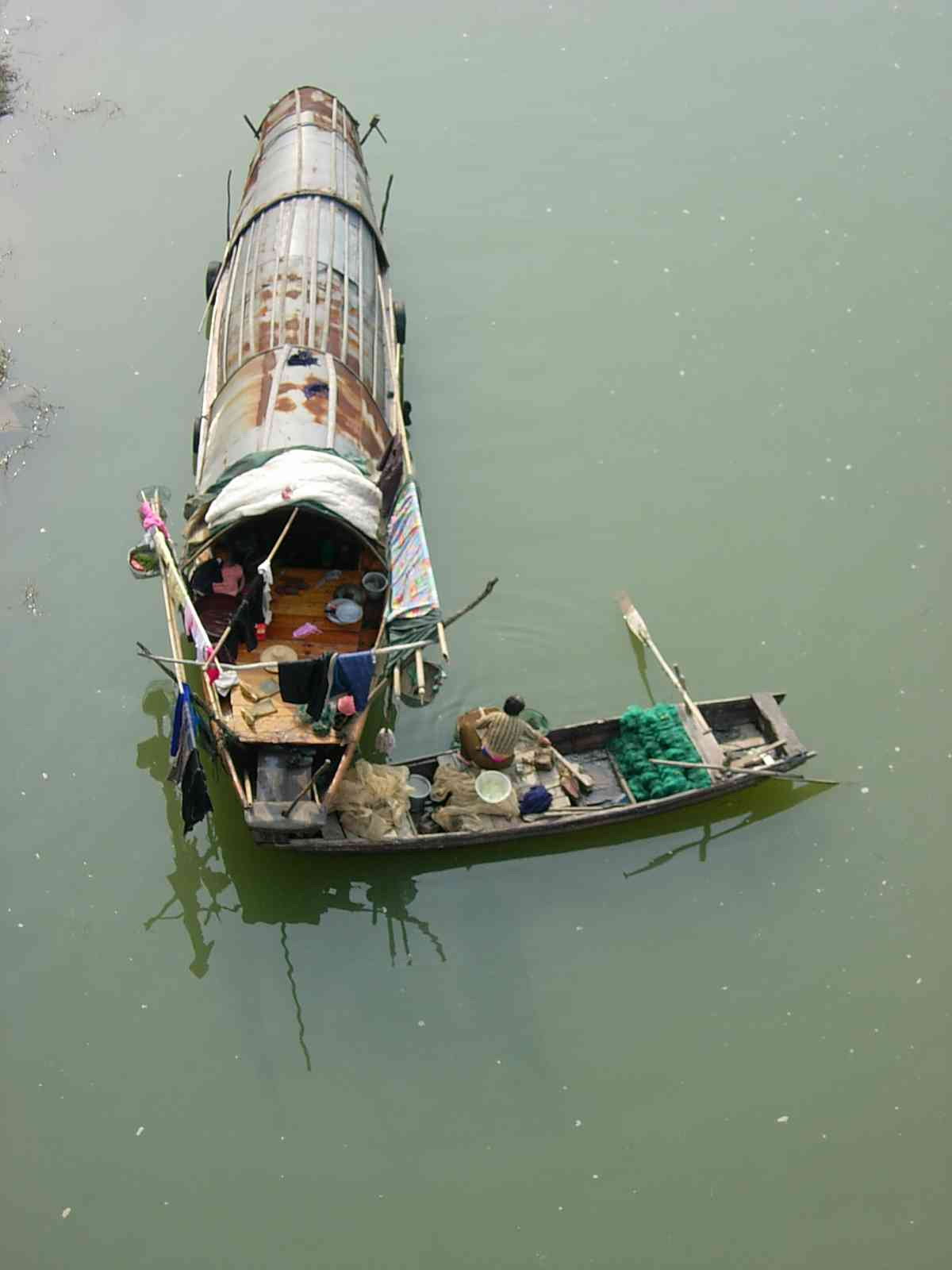
Poyang Lake fisherman who lives and feeds himself on a small fishing boat all year round

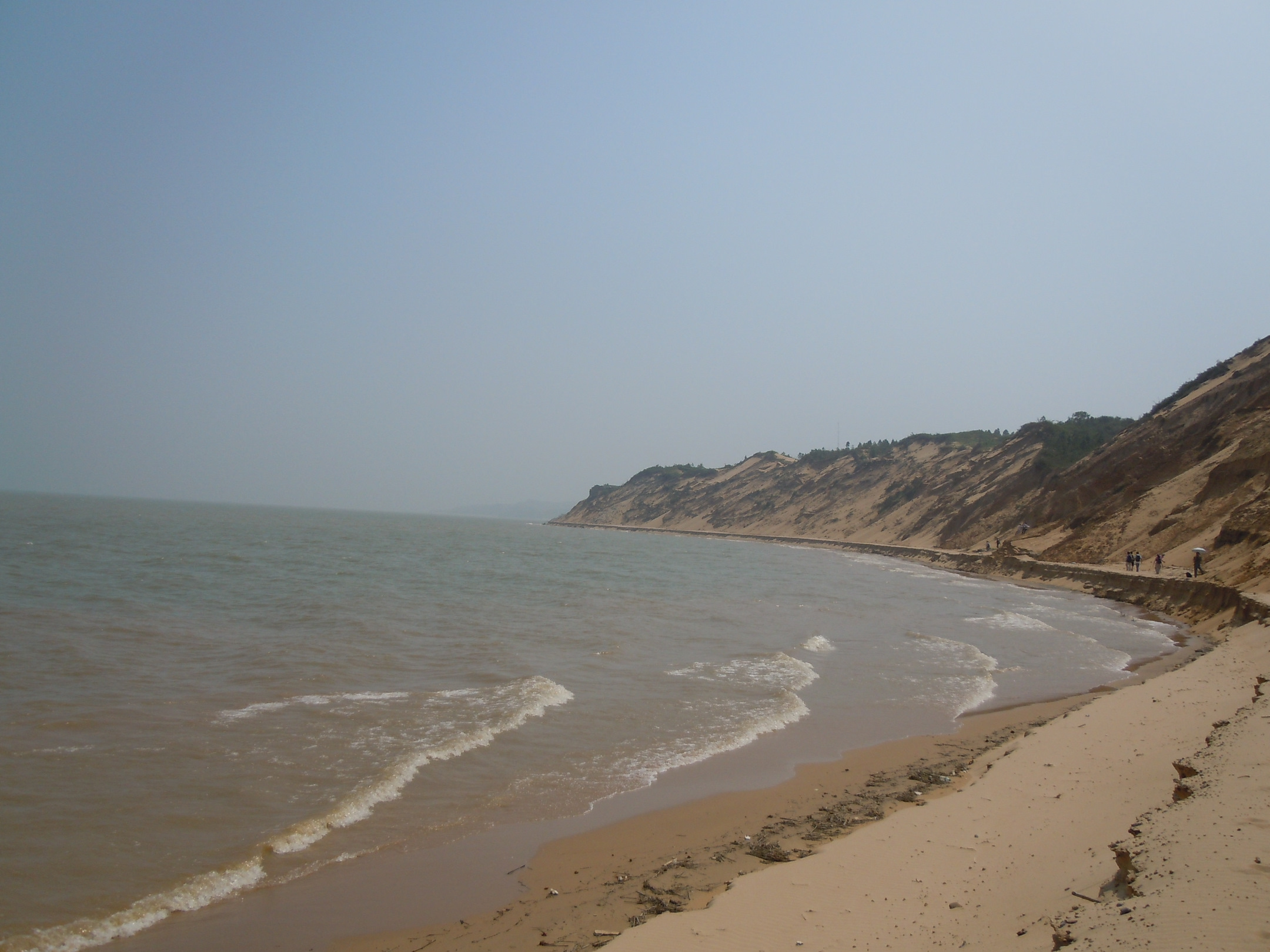
Sandy shore of the lake

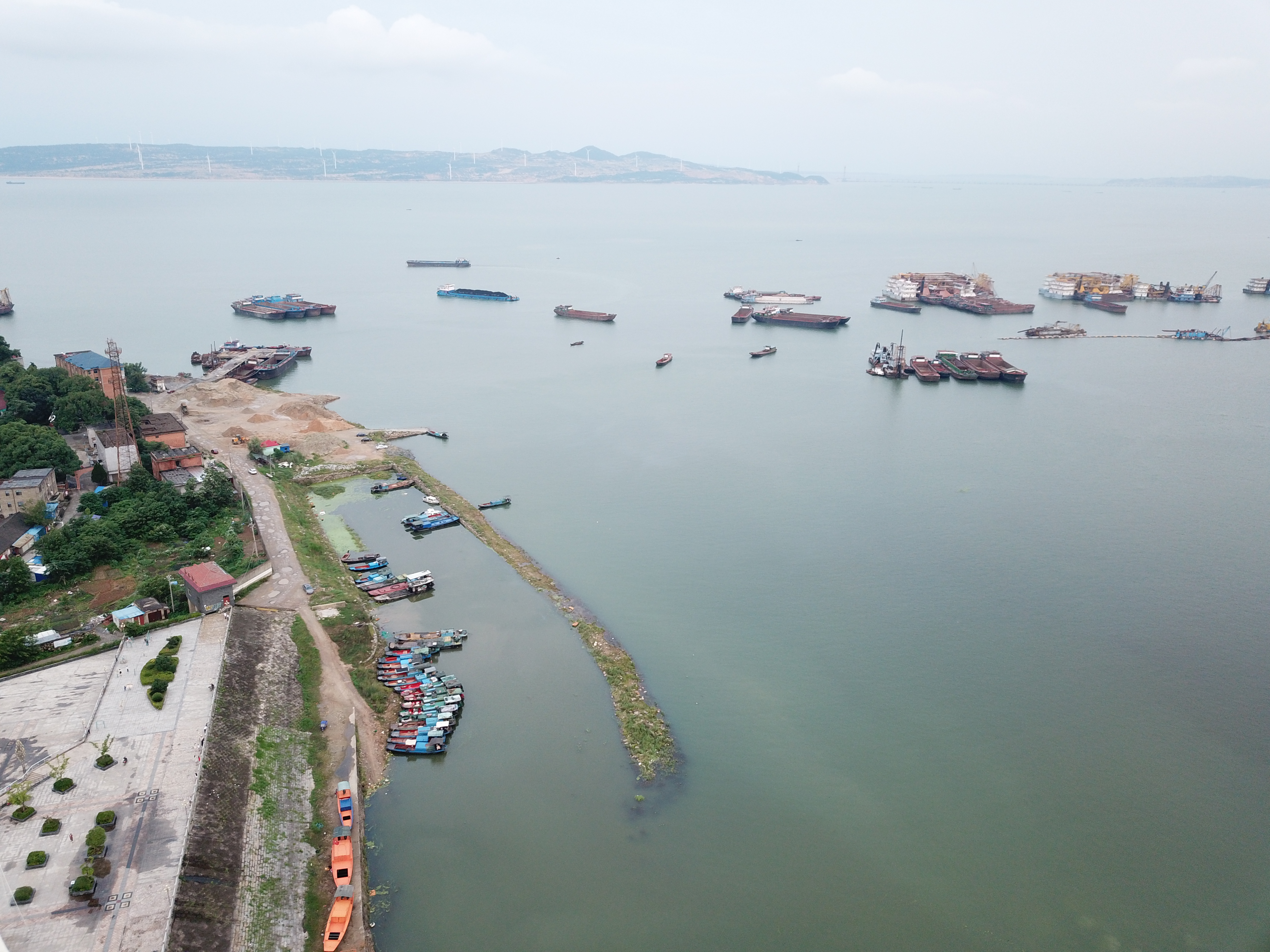
Ziyang Embankment

== See also ==
- Changjiang Plain evergreen forests
