= Konglong =

Konglong 孔垄镇
- Town
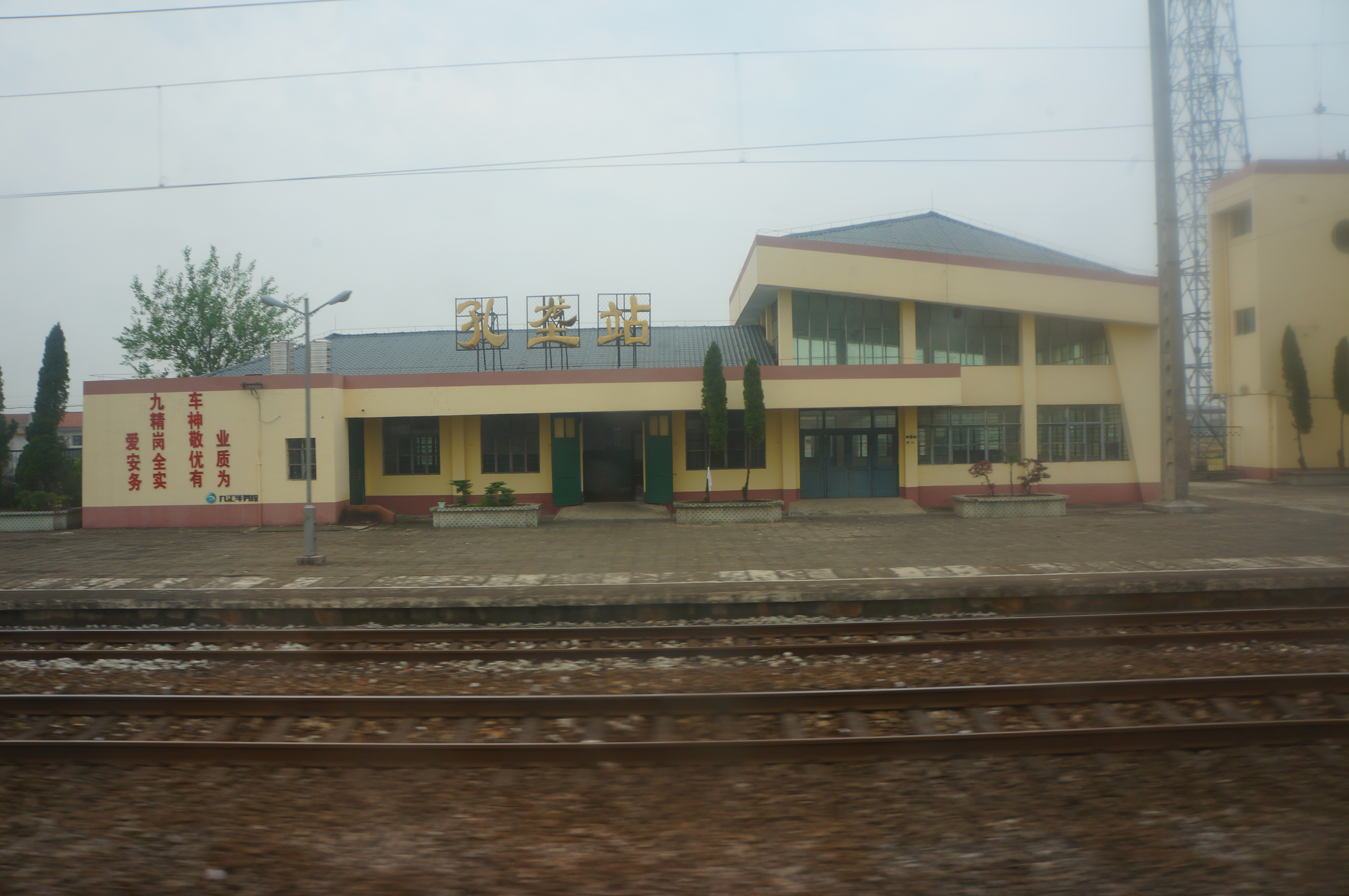
- Konglong Train Station

- Location in Hubei
- Coordinates: 29°53′11″N 115°54′48″E
- Country: People's Republic of China
- Province: Hubei
- Prefecture-level city: Huanggang
- County: Huangmei County
- Time zone: UTC+8 (China Standard)

Konglong (Chinese: 孔垄; pinyin: Kǒnglǒng) is a town under the administration of Huangmei County, Hubei, China. As of 2020, it administers the following five residential communities and 33 villages:

- Zhanghe Community (张河社区)
- Wanniantai Community (万年台社区)
- Xixiang Community (西厢社区)
- Zhanqian Avenue Community (站前大道社区)
- Xin'an Community (新安社区)
- Hongnian Village (洪碾村)
- Yanzha Village (严闸村)
- Kongdong Village (孔东村)
- Tangda Village (汤大村)
- Meiba Village (梅坝村)
- Xingwei Village (邢圩村)
- Xinggang Village (邢港村)
- Gongkou Village (公口村)
- Yangshulin Village (杨树林村)
- Wangba Village (王坝村)
- Jiangyouzha Village (蒋油榨村)
- Hongpu Village (洪铺村)
- Wuli Village (五里村)
- Qili Village (七里村)
- Mafangkou Village (马坊口村)
- Zhangtang Village (张塘村)
- Fudu Village (傅渡村)
- Yinwan Village (殷湾村)
- Dehua Village (德化村)
- Zhounian Village (周碾村)
- Dengdu Village (邓渡村)
- Yudun Village (余墩村)
- Fangfan Village (方畈村)
- Andun Village (安墩村)
- Jiangying Village (蒋营村)
- Lulü Village (卢垏村)
- Duanlü Village (段垏村)
- Meilü Village (梅垏村)
- Wuhe Village (吴河村)
- Changhu Village (长湖村)
- Guohu Village (郭湖村)
- Denghu Village (邓湖村)
- Liuqiao Village (刘桥村)
