= Tingqian =

Administrative town in Huangmei County, Hubei, China

Tingqian Town 停前镇 (Tíngqián Zhèn) Old names: 停前区、停前人民公社、亭前镇
- Town

Tíngqián Zhèn transcription(s)
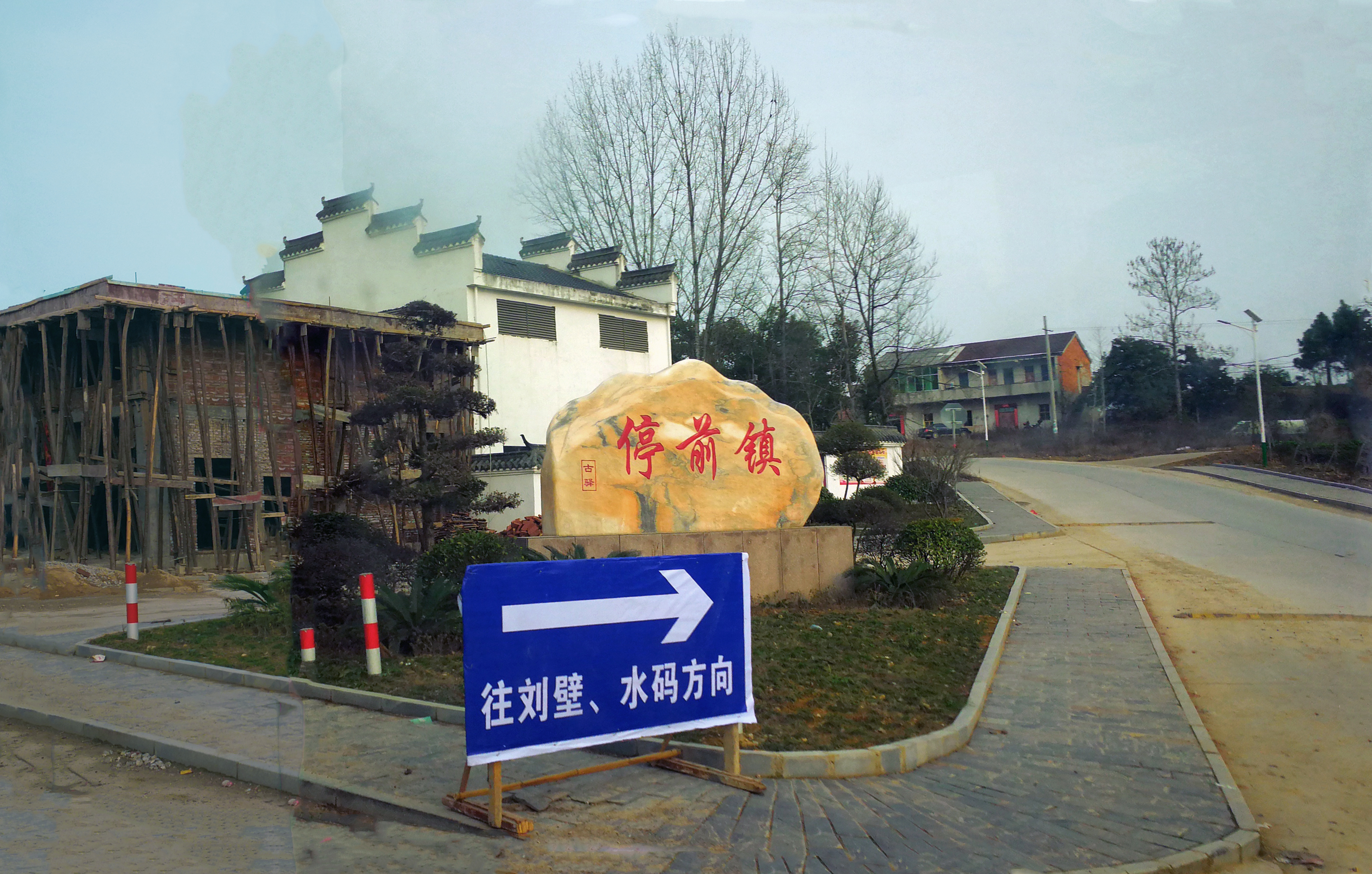
- Entrance of Tingqian Town

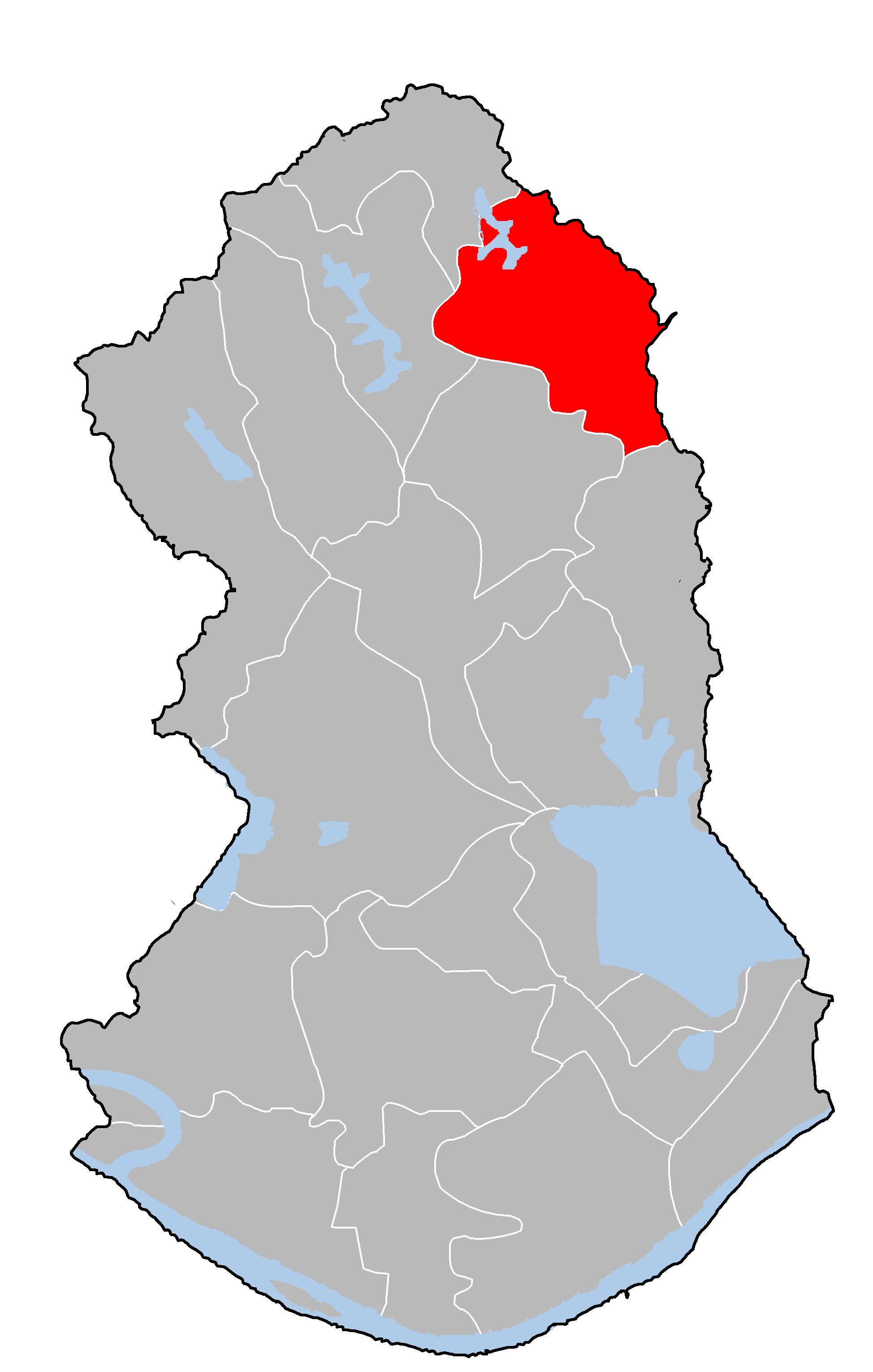
- Country: People's Republic of China
- Province: Hubei
- Administrative region: Huangmei
- Established: 1987

Area
  - Total: 83.2 km^{2} (32.1 sq mi)

Population (2010)
  - Total: 33,323
  - Estimate (2010): 32,652
  - Permanent residents: 29,184 (2,018)
- Time zone: UTC+8 (Beijing Time)
- Administrative division code: 42 11 27 105 000
- Postal code: 435500
- Area code: +86 (0)713

Tingqian town (in Chinese: 停前镇), formerly known as Tingqian District and Tingqian People's Commune, is an administrative town under Huangmei County, Hubei Province, People's Republic of China. Located in the northeast of Huangmei County, in the northern part of the Dabie Mountains, it encompasses an area that integrates old, reservoir, and mountain regions. The name "Tingqian" originates from the ancient relay station established during the Ming dynasty. It was named so because "travelers stopped here to rest before continuing their journey." The town's economy is predominantly agriculture-based, with extensive cultivation of blueberries, oil tea, and yellow tea. Additionally, there is development in tourism, forestry, and animal husbandry. It is recognized as a poverty-stricken town at the provincial level in Hubei and serves as one of the border trade "gateways" between Hubei and Anhui. The town government is located in Tingqian Village within its boundaries. As of the end of 2018, the town had a total registered population of 29,184.

== History ==
In 1983, numerous ancient cultural sites were discovered within its territory, dating back to the Neolithic and Shang-Zhou periods. During the Tang dynasty, Wang Xianzhi, a leader of a peasant uprising army, stationed himself in Huangmei and was beheaded at the Yuanpei Hill in Tingqian. From the end of the Yuan dynasty to the twelfth year of the Zhizheng period (1352), a peasant uprising army led by Xu Shouhui was stationed in Tingqian and suffered defeat. In the fourteenth year of the Hongwu period of the Ming dynasty (1381), Tingqian Relay Station was established in the area, known as the "administrative office connecting seven provinces." It served as a transportation hub between Hubei and Anhui and is the origin of the name Tingqian Town. The Tingqian Relay Station was named so because "travelers stopped there to rest before continuing their journey". During the Taiping Heavenly Kingdom period, the Taiping Army engaged in battles with the Qing Army in Tingqian.

During the late Qing dynasty and the early Republic of China period, "Li Jia" was renamed as a township, and the name "Tingqian Town" first appeared. It belonged to Fengyuan Township and governed 28 villages. Another part of the present territorial area of Tingqian belonged to Zhuobi Town in Xincheng Township, with jurisdiction over 25 villages. During the Republic of China period, Tingqian was once the location of the Huangmei County government. From 1927 to 1931, during the first Chinese Civil War between the Nationalist Party (Kuomintang) and the Chinese Communist Party (CCP), the Chinese Workers' and Peasants' Red Army divided Huangmei into five districts. Tingqian was part of the Eastern District, with the Soviet Office of the Eastern District located within the Dongsheng Wang Temple in Tingqian Street. Before the Second Sino-Japanese War, the original four townships were transformed into four districts, comprising 38 towns, with Tingqian Town falling under District 3. During this period, the Nationalist government frequently suppressed the activities of the CCP. In 1934 (23rd year, according to the calendar of the Republic of China), the CCP reinstated its organization in Tingqian, Huangmei, sending Zhou Wangsheng and Zhou Liansheng, among others. During the Second Sino-Japanese War, the Huangmei County government retained the district system, converting towns into townships. The original 38 towns were reorganized into 23 townships, merging Tingqian Town and Gujiao Town into Tinggu Township.

From August to November 1947, the Second Field Army commanded by Liu Bocheng and Deng Xiaoping advanced into Huangmei after a long march into the Dabie Mountains, establishing the Huangmei County People's Democratic Government. The upper half of Huangmei was divided into six districts, with District 3 being Tingqian. On May 8, 1949, the establishment of the Huanggang region led to the abolition of the administrative division of Huangmei County during the Republic of China era. Five new districts were created, including Tuqiao, and Tingqian Town's jurisdiction belonged to that district. In August 1952, the entire county was restructured into 12 districts based on natural environments, encompassing 163 townships. Tingqian District was first established as District 3, governing 13 townships: Wangjiangshan, Xiaoping, Tingqian, Chenyuan, Tieniu, Laopu, Tafan, Anren, Guyue, Chaixia, Shicang, Liubi, and Jiangpang. However, in the latter part of 1955, Tingqian District was merged back into the Tuqiao District. In April 1958, the five townships of Wangjiang, Liulin, Tieniu, and Shuima were separated from the Tuqiao District, re-establishing Tingqian District. By the end of the year, the entire county underwent collectivization, and Tingqian District was changed to Shangyou People's Commune. In February 1959, it was renamed Tingqian People's Commune based on the geographic location.

In the reorganization and merger of districts and communes in October 1975, the People's Commune of Tingqian was divided into two communes: one retained the name Tingqian, while a newly established one was called Liulin People's Commune. The Tingqian People's Commune had jurisdiction over three administrative areas: Tingqian, Liubi, and Shuima, with 19 production brigades, 273 production teams, 1 natural town, and 284 natural villages. On the other hand, the Liulin People's Commune encompassed three administrative areas: Liulin, Laopu, and Wangjiang, with 14 production brigades, 141 production teams, 142 natural villages, and 1 natural town.

During the dissolution and merger of communes in February 1984, the People's Communes were dissolved, and two communes were merged to form the Tingqian District. It had jurisdiction over six townships, a township-level town named Tingqian, 35 villagers' committees, and 330 villagers' groups, totaling 412 natural villages. In 1987, all 69 townships and township-level towns were abolished, and 12 districts and 6 district-level towns were transformed into 13 townships and 10 towns. Some territory was separated from the Tingqian District to establish Liulin Township, while the remaining area was restructured into Tingqian Town.

Upon the establishment of Tingqian Town in 1987, it had 21 villagers' committees, 170 villagers' groups, and 1 residents' committee. These committees were named as follows:

Tingqian Village, Jinzhai Village, Sanqupu Village, Hailuoshan Village, Zhoutangan Village, Deng'ao Village, Changchong Village, Shicang Village, Huzhai Village, Caiqiao Village, Meilong Village, Jiangbang Village, Jiangchong Village, Panhe Village, Liubi Village, Tieniu Village, Tongzhai Village, Jieling Village, Chaixia Village, Dongchong Village, Nanchong Village.

Subsequently, some villagers' committees were renamed. As of 2019, Tingqian Town still administers 21 administrative villages, all of which are administrative villages.

== Environment ==
=== Geographical location ===
Tingqian town is situated at the forefront of the Dabie Mountains, historically recognized as a strategic military location. It is located in the northeast of Huangmei County, bordering Erlang and Fuyu Townships in Susong County, Anhui Province, to the east, adjacent to Shanmu Township to the south, Wuzu Temple to the west, and Liulin Township to the north. The town government is situated at Tingqian Xin Street in Tingqian Village, approximately 170 kilometers from the provincial capital of Wuhan and 18 kilometers from the county seat. Due to its location on the boundary between Hubei and Anhui provinces, Tingqian was identified by the Hubei Provincial Government as one of Hubei's border trade "gateways". However, despite this designation, Tingqian faces geographical disadvantages, being far from urban centers and suburban areas.

=== Environment ===
Tingqian town

Climate chart (precipitation, max. and min. temperature)
J	F	M	A	M	J	J	A	S	O	N	D
52 10 0	160 13 5	179 17 6	194 23 13	310 27 15	241 27 20	234 29 25	175 29 23	121 27 20	95 25 15	120 16 9	77 11 1
- █ Average max. and min. temperatures in °C
- █ Precipitation totals in mm
- Source: NASA Earth Observations Data Set Index
Imperial conversion
J	F	M	A	M	J	J	A	S	O	N	D
2 50 32	6.3 55 41	7 63 43	7.6 73 55	12 81 59	9.5 81 68	9.2 84 77	6.9 84 73	4.8 81 68	3.7 77 59	4.7 61 48	3 52 34
- █ Average max. and min. temperatures in °F
- █ Precipitation totals in inches

The administrative area of Tingqian Town covers an area of 83.27 square kilometers. It is located in the northern part of the Dabie Mountains, serving as a transitional zone between the ancient Jiaoshan Mountain Range and the plain areas. The terrain slopes from north to south, with the western and northern regions bordering the Gujiao Reservoir being more mountainous, classified under the Huaiyang geoplate. In the eastern part, there are undulating hills interspersed with small patches of fields, presenting a relatively flat topography. The central and southern areas consist of hilly terrains and plain regions. The highest point within its boundaries is Jishijian Peak (488 meters above sea level), along with other relatively high peaks like Qianjia. It experiences a subtropical monsoon climate with abundant sunshine and distinct seasons, yet it is moist. However, the mountainous regions have lower temperatures, stronger winds, shorter sunlight exposure, and a frost-free period that is 30 to 50 days less than the plain areas, with seasons often delayed by 15 to 30 days. As per the 2016 statistics, the average temperature of the town is 17 °C, with July being the warmest month at 27 °C, and January being the coolest at 5 °C. The average annual rainfall is 1963 millimeters, with May being the wettest month, averaging 310 millimeters, and the driest month is January, receiving 52 millimeters of rainfall.

Most of the area in Tingqian Town is occupied by farmland. The primary soils found in this region are red sandy clay soil (distributed in the high and low hilly areas of Tingqian) and fine red sandy clay soil (found in Liubi, Shuima, and Zhaojiazhuang), followed by tidal sandy soil. There is also a small amount of limestone soil and red wusha sandy soil (found in Liubi and Fengshu'ao). Regarding paddy fields, various types are found, including shallow red fine sandy clay fields (in Liubi and Shuima), shallow red sandy clay fields (on high and low hills in Tingqian), shallow sandy clay fields (on dry mountains ranging from 500 to 800 meters), fine red sandy clay fields (in Liubi, Shuima, etc., on low hills, gullies, mounds, bays, and fields), red wusha sandy clay fields (in the major mountain fault zones of Tingqian, Liubi, and Shuima), red bubble yellow mud fields, sandy mud fields, mountain sandy mud fields, limestone mud fields, tidal mud fields, and cold spring fields. Except for certain areas like Shuima where limestone-developed soil is alkaline, the rest of the soil in the region is mildly acidic or acidic. There are mineral resources such as talcum powder ore, clay ore, mica ore, quartz ore, limestone ore, granite, and feldspar.

The ancient Jiaoshan Reservoir, located within the area, was built in 1956 and completed the following year. It serves as a medium-sized key reservoir mainly used for flood control and irrigation, supplemented by aquaculture and power generation. The total storage capacity reaches 56.34 million cubic meters, covering a catchment area of 73 square kilometers, with a designed irrigation area of 108,000 mu (around 18,000 acres). The reservoir has two main canals, the East Canal and the West Canal, spanning the entire town. Additionally, there are seven rivers and four small reservoirs within the Tingqian area.

The town's primary natural resource configuration revolves around "six mountains, one river, and three portions of farmland". Tingqian Town strives to develop as an ecological town, with forest coverage exceeding 95%. Over 70% of this forest area is designated as ecological forests, with plans to establish several natural reserves. The harmony between humans and nature, along with the "continuous pine trees for ten miles" scene, has been specially featured in the overseas edition of the People's Daily.

== Economy ==
Tingqian Town is among the 200 provincially supported key poverty-stricken towns designated by the Hubei Provincial People's Government. In 2012, the town's gross domestic product (GDP) reached 1.26 billion yuan, marking a 16.6% year-on-year increase. Fixed asset investment amounted to 170 million yuan, growing by 106.7% year-on-year. In 2015, the total fiscal revenue for the town was 4.703 million yuan.

=== Agriculture ===
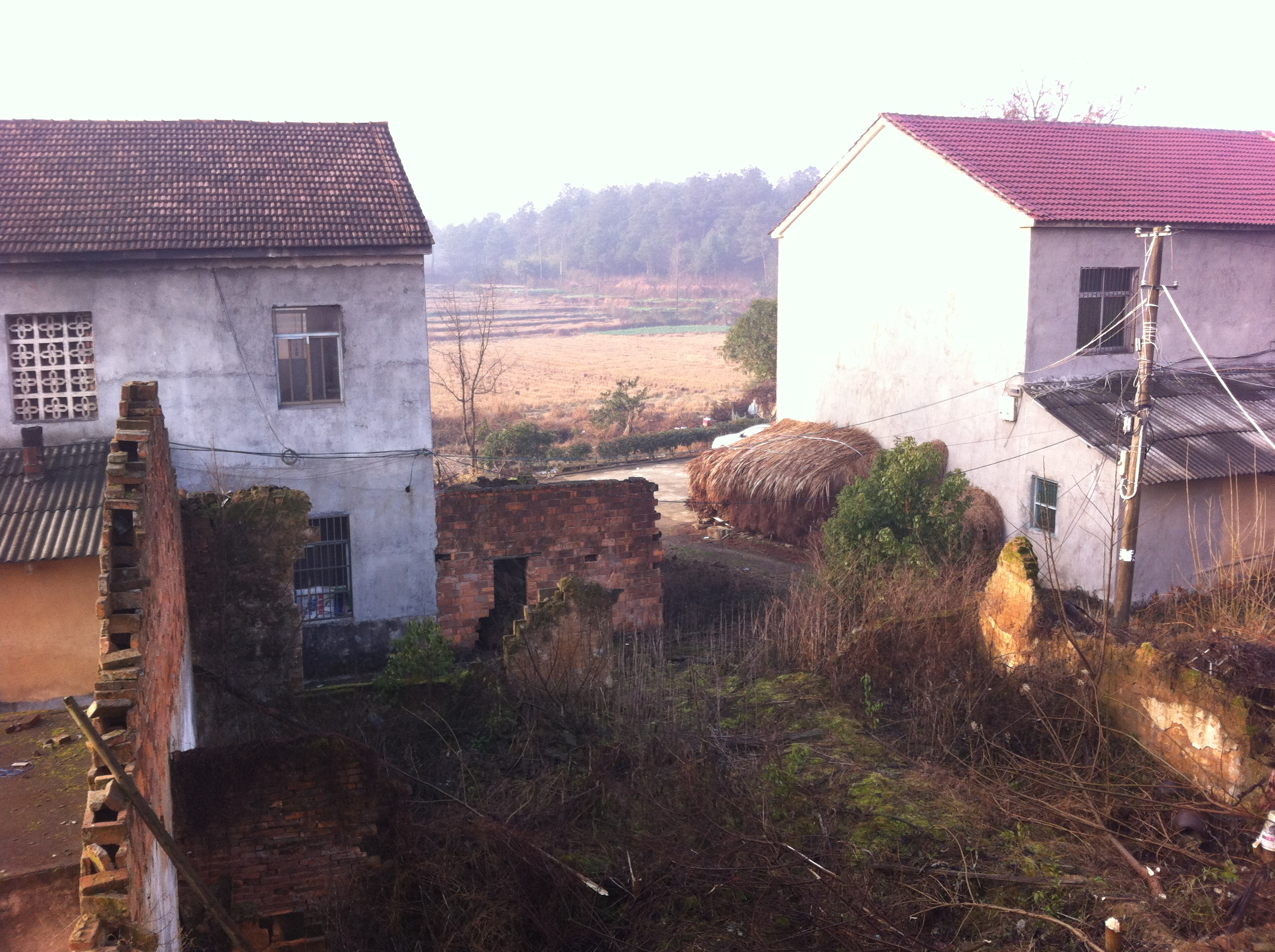
A corner of Dengao Village in Tingqian Town.

Agriculture is the primary driving force of the local economy in Tingqian Town. Most of the arable land is scattered on the high mountains in the northern part of the town, sporadically distributed. Some barren hills are covered with weeds, prompting local villagers to remark "guarding the green mountains, yet poor as can be". In the 1980s, the town primarily cultivated rice, sweet potatoes, wheat, and potatoes. Notable local specialties included tea leaves, fava beans, Chinese cabbage, ginger, Shuima red dates, Chaixia honey tangerines, and chestnuts. The Chaixia honey tangerines gained fame for their sweet taste, while the tea leaves, represented by the Yejiadang Tea Plantation, were well-regarded. Also, in the 1980s, Tingqian Town had an area of more than 30,000 mu (around 2,000 hectares) of arable land, with paddy fields occupying the majority, and a small portion designated for dry farming. By the late 2002, the town had around 12,750 hectares of cultivated land, with a sowing area of 2,925 hectares for crops.

Since the beginning of the 21st century, farming hasn't been able to meet the local residents' needs. In 2017, with the aim of lifting villagers out of poverty, Tingqian Town set the development goal of becoming a key oil-tea town and creating a blueberry hub. The local government divided the entire town into three functional areas. Specifically, in the eastern part of Tingqian Town, the blueberry industry is being developed, while in the central and western areas, the focus is on the oil-tea industry, creating an "ecological conservation and development zone". To elaborate, the town aims to construct a 10,000-mu blueberry base centered in Tongzhai Village, establish a 20,000-mu oil-tea base centered in Liubi Village, and create an 8,000-mu yellow tea base centered in Haishan and Jiangchong Villages. Additionally, some impoverished households use idle land for planting oil-tea and blueberries in hopes of prosperity. By 2012, the average annual income of farmers in Tingqian reached 5,558 yuan, an increase of 683 yuan from the previous year. As of December 2015, there were 37,600 rural residents in the entire town, with an average disposable income per rural resident of 9,318 yuan.

The oil-tea planting project in Tingqian Town covers four villages: Liubi, Jieling, Tieniu, and Deng'ao. From 2013 to 2020, the initial phase of the project has seen a total investment of 1.25 billion yuan, planning to use an area of 100,000 mu to plant approximately 8.9 million oil-tea plants and intercrop about 800,000 hickories and ornamental trees. Starting in May 2010, with the assistance of Jiangsu Jinzhi Company, 10 villages, including Tongzhai, Liubi, Huzhai, Caiqiao, Jiangchong, Changchong, and Shicang, underwent low hill and ridge transformation to establish a blueberry planting base covering an area of 30,000 mu. The harvested blueberries are sold in supermarkets across China and are in high demand. Tongzhai Village has been named the "Hubei Blueberry Town" and was awarded the title of "China Southern Small Berry Demonstration Base" by the Ministry of Agriculture, becoming a model village for small berries in China. On July 9, 2017, the town held the first Blueberry Picking Festival in Huangmei County.

=== Other industries ===
Location of Tingqian Town in China

Forestry is also a significant feature of Tingqian Town. In the 1980s, the entire Tingqian region (including present-day Liulin Township) had an afforested area of 32,823 mu, mostly natural forests. By December 2015, this number had increased to 73,000 mu (excluding Liulin Township). The main trees in the area include pine, cedar, and bamboo, implementing measures to develop an "ecological forestry city" and constructing Huangmei County's deep processing base for forestry. Locals have heavily developed economic forests, establishing a 500-mu bamboo base and a 1,000-mu eco-friendly fruit tree base. Since 2007, Dong Fan, a professor at China University of Geosciences and director of the China Mountaineering Association, has designated Nanchong Village in Tingqian as a field survival experience base for the school. Students are organized here for experiential training activities every semester. Tingqian also relies on forestry and agriculture to develop its tourism industry.

In the livestock industry, Tingqian Town invested 30 million yuan to establish a modern Hu sheep breeding farm, and additionally constructed a poultry farm for 10,000 birds, a Polled goat breeding farm, among others, serving as demonstrations for existing breeding grounds. The town also vigorously developed the pig farming industry and possessed farms like the Gujiao Pig Farm. The Gujiao Reservoir produces 100,000 kilograms of fresh fish annually and is one of the major aquatic suppliers in the county. In terms of industry, in 1972, areas like Tingqian began operating a phosphate fertilizer plant using a simple method of crushing phosphate rock and mixing it with sulfuric acid to produce phosphate fertilizer. In the 1980s, the Tingqian Commune had a total of 16 commune-operated enterprises, including lime factories, agricultural machinery repair plants, phosphate fertilizer plants, orchards, and mulberry fields. Among these, the talcum powder factory's products were once sold to several other provinces, reaching an annual production of 2,000 tons. By 2017, the entire town had a total of 26 enterprises with 639 employees; there were 6 industrial enterprises, with 1 being of a considerable scale (established in 2012).

== Population ==
=== Demographics ===
According to the sixth national census in 2010, Tingqian had a population of 33,323 people, residing in 7,268 households, averaging 4.58 persons per household. There were 5,753 children under 14 years, constituting 17.26% of the total population; 24,158 individuals were between 15 and 64 years, accounting for 72.50% of the total population; and there were 3,412 elderly individuals aged 65 and above, representing 10.24% of the total population. There were 17,538 males, making up 52.63% of the total population, and 15,785 females, accounting for 47.37% of the total population. Among the local residents, 32,652 had local household registration, making up 97.99% of the total population.

In 2015, the total registered population in the entire town was 40,998 people. By the end of 2018, the total permanent population in the town was 29,184 people.

=== Historical sites and relics ===
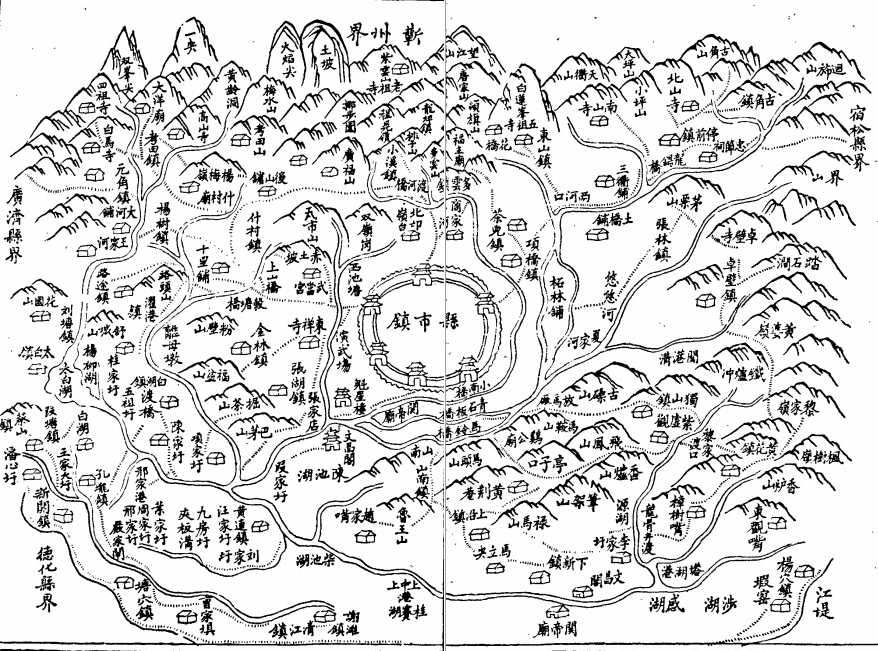
A map of the entire territory of ancient Huangmei County was drawn in the second year of Emperor Guangxu's reign (1876), with Tingqian Town depicted in the upper right corner.

The ancient Tingqian Post Station, established in the 14th year of the Hongwu reign of the Ming Dynasty (1381), also known as the Taizi Post Station, derived its name from the Taizi Street of the ancient post (where a consort of the Ming Dynasty gave birth to a son). Currently, several late-Qing Dynasty buildings remain, somewhat dilapidated yet retaining their ancient charm with carved beams, painted rafters, and ancient architectural styles. Adjacent to the ancient post, the Qingjiang Bridge was constructed over the Tingqian River, built in the first year of the Shunzhi reign of the Qing Dynasty (1644) and measuring over 17 zhang in length. By the 15th year of the Jiaqing reign (1810), more than half of the bridge had been washed away, and in 1954, the entire bridge collapsed. Presently, remnants of the Qingjiang Bridge consist of several remaining bridge piers. In 1971, it was reconstructed, renamed the Tingqian Bridge, measuring 60 meters in length, 6 meters in width, with two spans, made of reinforced concrete, capable of bearing 15 tons.

At the mid-slope of the western foothill of Hailuo Mountain in Tingqian Town lies the Hailuo Mountain Site, covering an area of 2,000 square meters, with a cultural layer approximately 0.3 meters thick, containing a large number of relics from the Western Zhou Dynasty. On a small hillside in Tingqian Town are the ruins of the Bangke Cliff Site, occupying an area of approximately 1,500 square meters. It is an irregular elongated shape, rising about 3 meters above the ground. In 1981, a member of the Tiechong Commune excavated a stone shovel, measuring 15 cm in length, 11.8 cm in width, 10.5 cm in bottom width, and 0.6 cm thick, with a hole diameter of 3 cm. Along with it, pottery fragments like tripod feet and li feet were discovered, indicating it to be a relic from the Shang and Zhou dynasties. Adjacent to the ancient post, about 200 meters away, lies the Wudang Palace Site. Covering an area of approximately 3,000 square meters, it is confirmed as a relic of an ancient village from the Shang and Western Zhou periods. Some of the buildings of the Wudang Palace, after the establishment of the People's Republic of China, were used as school classrooms and are currently part of the central school in Tingqian Town. The Chen River Site in Sanqu also holds artifacts from the Neolithic Age.

In April 1981, at the Fenghuang site of the Huzhai Brigade in Tingqian Commune (now Shuima Village), a large copper seal belonging to Xu Shouhui, a leader of a peasant uprising at the end of the Yuan Dynasty, weighing 1172.5 grams and measuring 11.7 square centimeters with a thickness of 1 centimeter, was unearthed. The front bears six large seal script characters reading "Seal of Commanding Ten Thousand Households", while the back side contains inscriptions in traditional Kai characters reading "Made by the Ministry of Rites of the Central Secretariat" and "The Third Year of Taiping, Month Unknown, Day Unknown".

Within the area lies the tomb of a Song dynasty kiln factory in Sanqu, located in the old Sanqu kiln factory, where copper mirrors, porcelain jars, and epitaphs were excavated in 1983.

=== Tourism ===
The local plan is centered around the Guanjiao Reservoir, integrating cultural tourism resources like Wuzu Temple, aiming to construct a residential outdoor leisure area, creating the "backyard" of the East Hubei Zen Culture Tourism Area. Additionally, the town aims to build a livable area in the northern mountainous region. Using the tourism resources of the ancient Tingqian Post Station and the Guanjiao Reservoir, Tingqian is developing tourist spots like Tingqian Flower Fairy Valley and creating Tingqian Post Station New Area as a township. Leveraging the advantages of the blueberry base, it's developing leisure tourism. During the blueberry flowering season, visitors can hike to enjoy the flowers, while during the harvest, they can pick and taste the blueberries. Other tourism projects within Tingqian Town include the Nanchong Outdoor Climbing Training Base, Chaixia Agritainment, Panhe Hot Spring, Tongzhai Blueberry Ecotourism Corridor, among others. The Longxu River Scenic Area project, with an investment of 500 million yuan, is scheduled to commence in September 2020. In 2018, Tingqian also developed the "Tingqian Cedar Ten-Mile Sightseeing Corridor", a pastoral complex. These various tourism resources and scenic spots form distinctive mountainous tourist routes.

=== Infrastructure ===
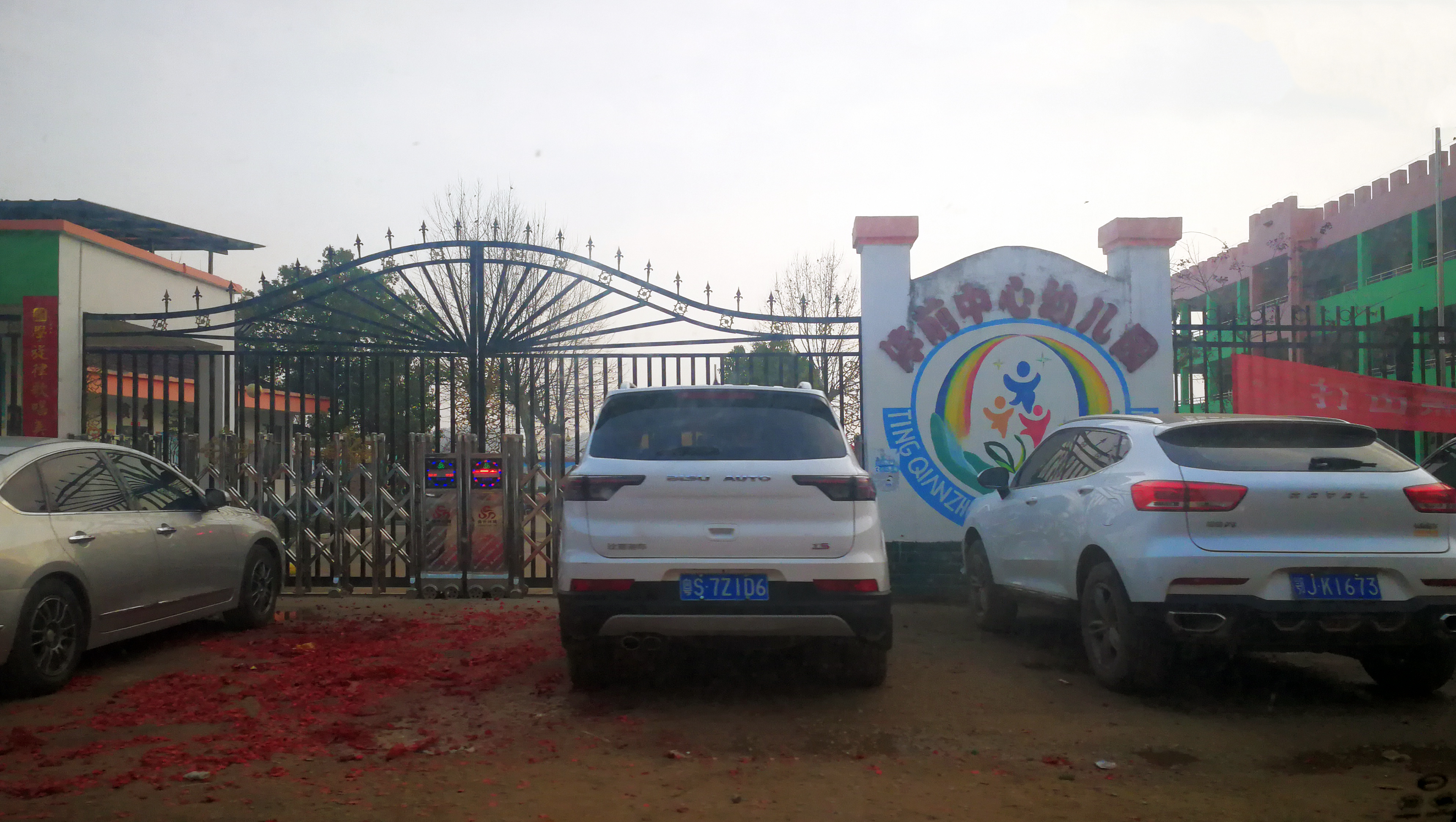
Tingqian Central Kindergarten

Early Tingqian's town construction was developed in line with the growth of township enterprises. Since the 21st century, with the local economy, especially tourism, booming, the town's infrastructure has undergone significant changes. Historically, the town's transportation mainly consisted of rugged mountain paths due to the mountainous terrain. According to records, mountain residents experienced hardships, described as "panting sounds, drip by drip, step by step up the ladder to the clouds". After Huangmei initiated poverty alleviation policies, road construction began. The Huangta Highway diagonally crosses the northern border, connecting Huangmei to Tingqian (Huangting Highway) in the south. The Huangta Highway was initially constructed in 1956 during the construction of the Guanjiao Reservoir, extending from Huangmei to the Guanjiao Reservoir dam. In 1966, it was extended to Tanfan Village in Liulin Township, spanning 32.25 kilometers. In 1975, the Xiaoting Highway was also constructed, covering a length of 16.8 kilometers from Xiahe Bridge to Tingqian. Additionally, the Chengliu Highway traverses east–west for 10 kilometers; the Dabieshan Interior Highway (also known as Yanzhang Highway) runs north–south for 17.5 kilometers; the Huangsong Highway (from Huangguling to Erlang River in Susong County) spans 6 kilometers; there are 168 kilometers of hardened rural roads. As for education, by 2012, Tingqian Town had a nine-year comprehensive school (Tingqian Town Nine-Year Comprehensive School), one middle school (Tingqian Town Middle School), five primary schools including Tingqian Town Central School, and four primary schools and teaching points. The area has been promoting educational reform, optimizing layouts and resource allocations, striving for balanced development.

== Administrative division ==
As of 2019, Tingqian Town oversees a total of 21 village-level administrative areas, all of which are administrative villages. Tingqian Village serves as the seat of the town government and is also the center for the economic and social development of Tingqian Town.

Name	Area Code	Name	Area Code
Tingqian Village※	421127105200	Jinzhai Village	421127105201
Sanqu Village	421127105202	Huiluoshan Village	421127105203
Zhoutang Village	421127105204	Deng'ao Village	421127105205
Chaixia Village	421127105206	Dongchong Village	421127105207
Nanchong Village	421127105208	Liubi Village	421127105209
Tongzhai Village	421127105210	Jieling Village	421127105211
Tieniu Village	421127105212	Changchong Village	421127105213
Shicang Village	421127105214	Caiqiao Village	421127105215
Huzhai Village	421127105216	Meilong Village	421127105217
Jiangchong Village	421127105218	Panhe Village	421127105219
Jiangtao Village	421127105220	※ Indicates the seat of the town government.	
