= Site of the Daye Soldiers Revolt =

Coordinates: 30.0956°N 114.9647°E

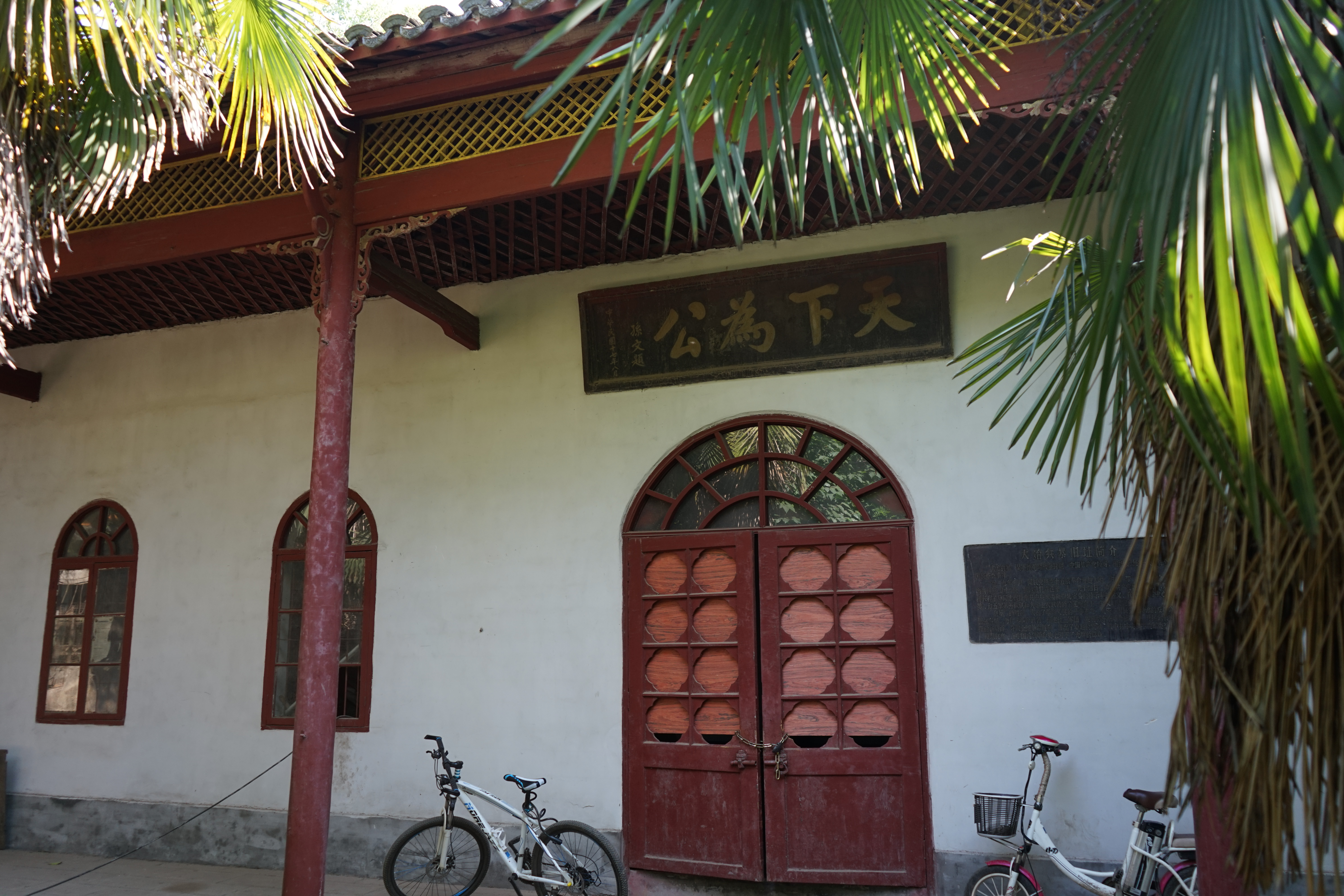
Site of the Daye Soldiers Revolt: Main Hall

Site of the Daye Soldiers Revolt (大冶兵暴旧址) is located within the campus of Daye Foreign Language School. In 1954 it was listed as a Historical and Cultural site Protected at the County Level, and in 2006 it was named a Major Historical and Cultural Site Protected at the National Level. On December 14, 1929, Cheng Zihua, then a platoon leader of National Revolutionary Army, led a revolt in collaboration with 5th Corps of the Red Army. The site was first built as Wubei Institute in 1827. It has a construction area of 2500 square meters.
