= Xiushui River =

River in Jiangxi, China

The Xiushui River (Chinese: 修水河) is a river in Jiangxi, China that runs 200 kilometers (120 mi) west to Poyang Lake. It was the site of the 1939 Battle of Xiushui River.
