= Huangmei County =

Huangmei County 黄梅县 Hwangmei
- County
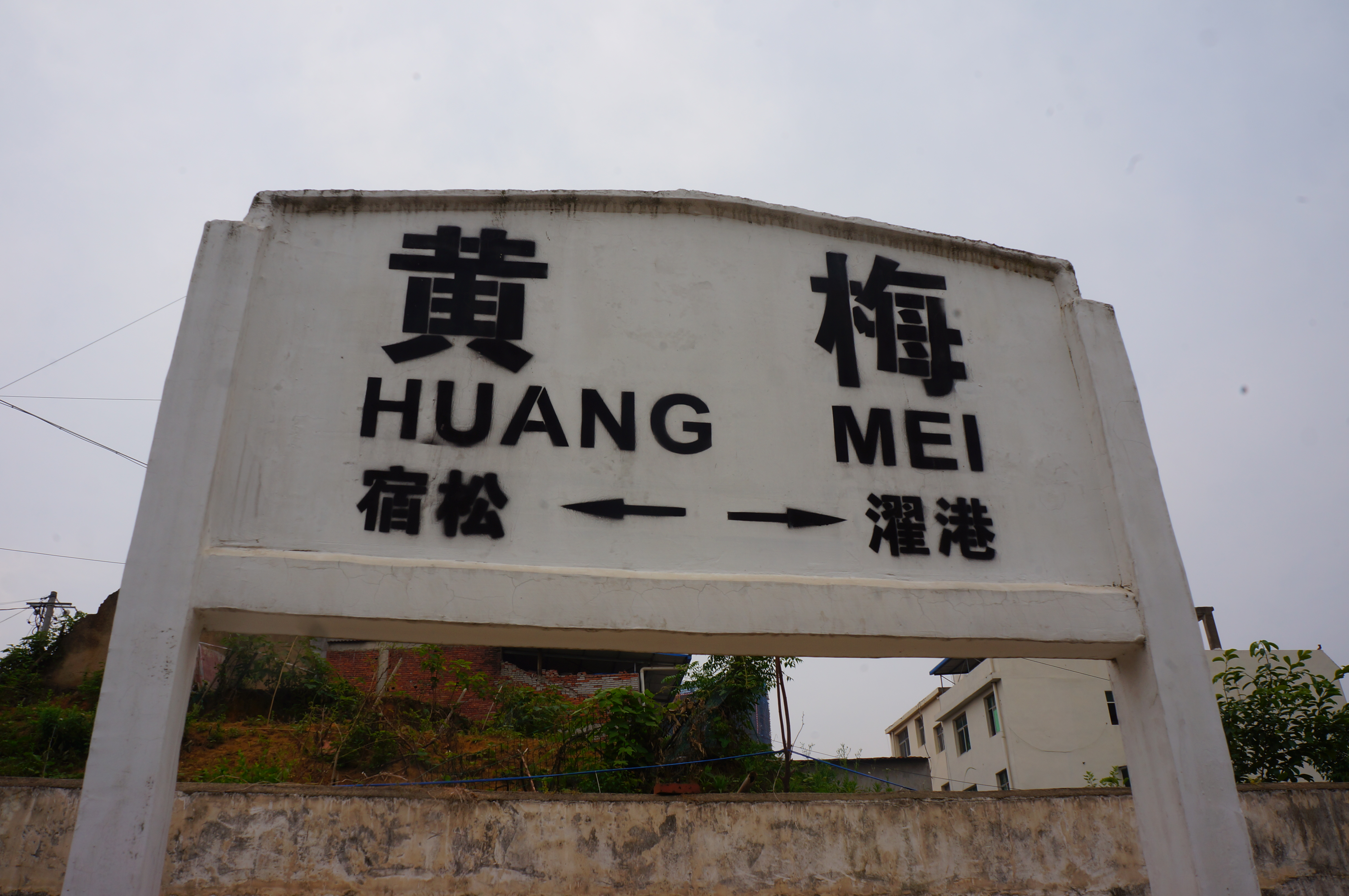
- Huangmei Station

- Location of the seat in Hubei
- Coordinates (Huangmei government): 30°04′14″N 115°56′39″E
- Country: People's Republic of China
- Province: Hubei
- Prefecture-level city: Huanggang

Area
  - Total: 1,707 km^{2} (659 sq mi)

Population (2020 census)
  - Total: 787,783
  - Density: 461.5/km^{2} (1,195/sq mi)
- Time zone: UTC+8 (China Standard)
- Website: 黄梅县人民政府门户网站 (Huangmei County People's Government Web Portal) (in Simplified Chinese)

Huangmei County (simplified Chinese: 黄梅县; traditional Chinese: 黃梅縣; pinyin: Huángméi Xiàn) falls under the administration of Huanggang City in eastern Hubei province, People's Republic of China, and borders Anhui to the east and Jiangxi to the south across the Yangtze. It also administers Shanjia Islet (单家洲) in the Yangtze.

== Geography ==
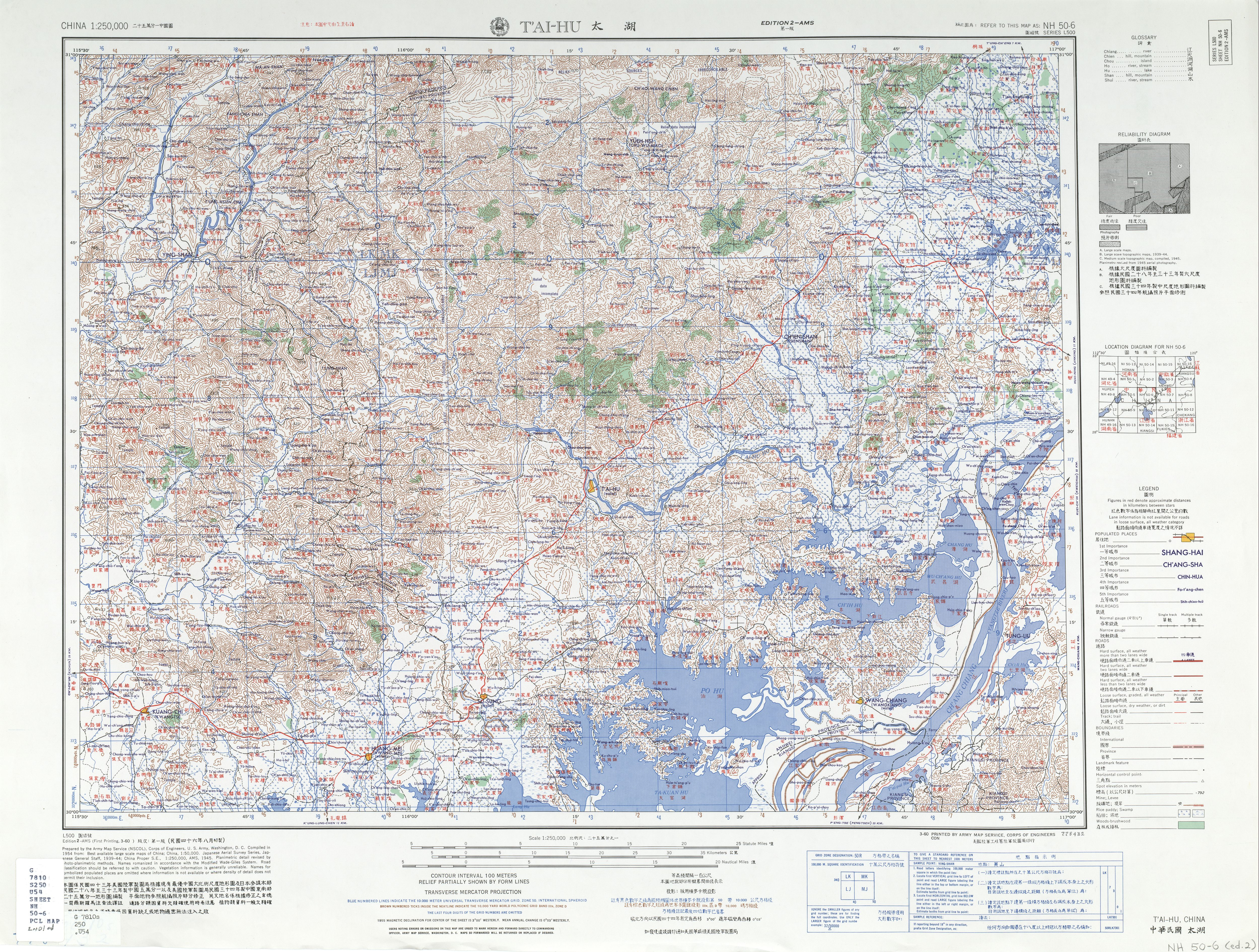
Map including Huangmei (labeled as HUANG-MEI (HWANG-MEI) (walled) 黃梅) (AMS, 1954)

=== Administrative divisions ===
Huangmei County administers:

#	Name	Chinese (S)
Towns
1	Huangmei	黄梅镇
2	Konglong	孔垄镇/孔垅镇
3	Xiaochi	小池镇
4	Zhuogang	濯港镇
5	Xinkai	新开镇
6	Caishan	蔡山镇
7	Wuzu	五祖镇
8	Tingqian	停前镇
9	Xiaxin	下新镇
10	Dahe	大河镇
11	Fenlu	分路镇
12	Dushan	独山镇
Townships
13	Shamu	杉木乡
14	Liulin	柳林乡
15	Kuzhu	苦竹乡
16	Liuzuo	刘佐乡
Other Area
17	Longgan Lake Farm	龙感湖农场

As of 2013, the county jurisdiction over 12 towns, 4 townships, which are Huangmei town, Koike town, KONGLONG town, under the new town, big town, stopped before the town, Wuzu town, town Zhuo, Cai Town, the new open town, town alone, shunt town, fir Township, Liulin Township, Nigatake Township, township and Liu Zuo Nuebu Park management Office, management Office Longganghu.

== History ==
In 845 BC Marquis Wen 文侯 Huang Meng 黃孟 (aka Huang Zhang 黃璋) moved the capital of the State of Huang from Yicheng to Huangchuan (present-day Huangchuan, Henan). Huang Xi's descendants ruled State of Huang until 648 BC when it was destroyed by the State of Chu. The Marquis of Huang, Marquis Mu 穆侯 Huang Qisheng 黃企生, fled to the state of Qi. The people of Huang were forced to relocate to Chu. They settled in the region of present-day Hubei province, in a region known as the Jiangxia Prefecture 江夏郡 during the Han dynasty (206 BC-AD 220). There are many places in this region today that were named after Huang e.g. Huanggang, Huangpi, Huangmei, Huangshi, Huangan, Huangzhou etc. A large number of the people of Huang were also relocated to regions south of the Yangtze River.

== Climate ==
Climate data for Huangmei, elevation 32 m (105 ft), (1991–2020 normals, extremes 1981–present)
Month	Jan	Feb	Mar	Apr	May	Jun	Jul	Aug	Sep	Oct	Nov	Dec	Year
Record high °C (°F)	21.3 (70.3)	27.0 (80.6)	32.2 (90.0)	32.8 (91.0)	36.0 (96.8)	37.9 (100.2)	39.7 (103.5)	39.6 (103.3)	37.5 (99.5)	33.6 (92.5)	29.7 (85.5)	22.5 (72.5)	39.7 (103.5)
Mean daily maximum °C (°F)	8.8 (47.8)	10.9 (51.6)	16.9 (62.4)	22.8 (73.0)	27.1 (80.8)	29.5 (85.1)	32.7 (90.9)	33.2 (91.8)	29.1 (84.4)	24.0 (75.2)	18.0 (64.4)	11.0 (51.8)	22.0 (71.6)
Daily mean °C (°F)	4.8 (40.6)	6.7 (44.1)	12.0 (53.6)	17.7 (63.9)	22.5 (72.5)	25.5 (77.9)	28.6 (83.5)	28.5 (83.3)	24.1 (75.4)	18.8 (65.8)	13.1 (55.6)	6.4 (43.5)	17.4 (63.3)
Mean daily minimum °C (°F)	2.0 (35.6)	3.6 (38.5)	8.1 (46.6)	13.3 (55.9)	18.6 (65.5)	22.3 (72.1)	25.1 (77.2)	25.0 (77.0)	20.5 (68.9)	15.1 (59.2)	9.6 (49.3)	3.1 (37.6)	13.9 (57.0)
Record low °C (°F)	−6.0 (21.2)	−5.7 (21.7)	−2.5 (27.5)	2.0 (35.6)	9.1 (48.4)	14.1 (57.4)	19.5 (67.1)	18.4 (65.1)	12.0 (53.6)	3.2 (37.8)	−1.5 (29.3)	−10.2 (13.6)	−10.2 (13.6)
Average precipitation mm (inches)	60.8 (2.39)	82.7 (3.26)	127.7 (5.03)	158.8 (6.25)	189.1 (7.44)	239.6 (9.43)	206.0 (8.11)	142.9 (5.63)	83.8 (3.30)	61.7 (2.43)	66.3 (2.61)	41.9 (1.65)	1,461.3 (57.53)
Average precipitation days (≥ 0.1 mm)	11.2	11.6	14.9	13.8	13.6	14.0	11.5	10.9	8.1	8.0	9.6	8.8	136
Average snowy days	3.4	2.0	0.7	0.1	0	0	0	0	0	0	0.1	1.3	7.6
Average relative humidity (%)	75	74	75	75	76	80	80	79	75	72	74	73	76
Mean monthly sunshine hours	94.1	96.0	116.0	145.2	162.5	143.7	205.9	208.9	173.8	160.1	138.1	122.2	1,766.5
Percentage possible sunshine	29	30	31	37	38	34	48	51	47	46	44	39	40
Source: China Meteorological Administration

== Huangmei Ohe tone ==
Huangmei is famous for its drug tone, also called Huangmei Ohe tone or Huibei East drug tone. In Huangmei county, Ohe tone is also occasionally called Huangmei song, which is not related to Huangmei opera (Chinese: 黃梅戲 / 黃梅調;; pinyin: Huángméixì / Huángméidiào). It is a combination of local folk songs, dances, and some ancient operas. Huangmei Ohe tone flourished in the late 18th century to become one of the most typical Huibei opera (Han opera) forms.

== Notable people ==
- Daman Hongren (忍大師) (AD601–AD674): the fifth Patriarch of Chan Buddhism
- Mrs Florence Chaing Szutu (江尊群護士長): the first head nurse of China, Chaing married to Dr. Gene Chan Szutu (司徒展醫生), and passed away on December 20, 2004 in Los Angeles, USA.
- Zhou Dijie (周濯街): writer, Mr Zhou written twenty books about Chinese folk legends.

== Transport ==
Huangmei is connected to Jiujiang by two bridges across the Yangtze River.
