= Chongren Road station =

Metro station in Wuhan, China

Chongren Road 崇仁路 metro
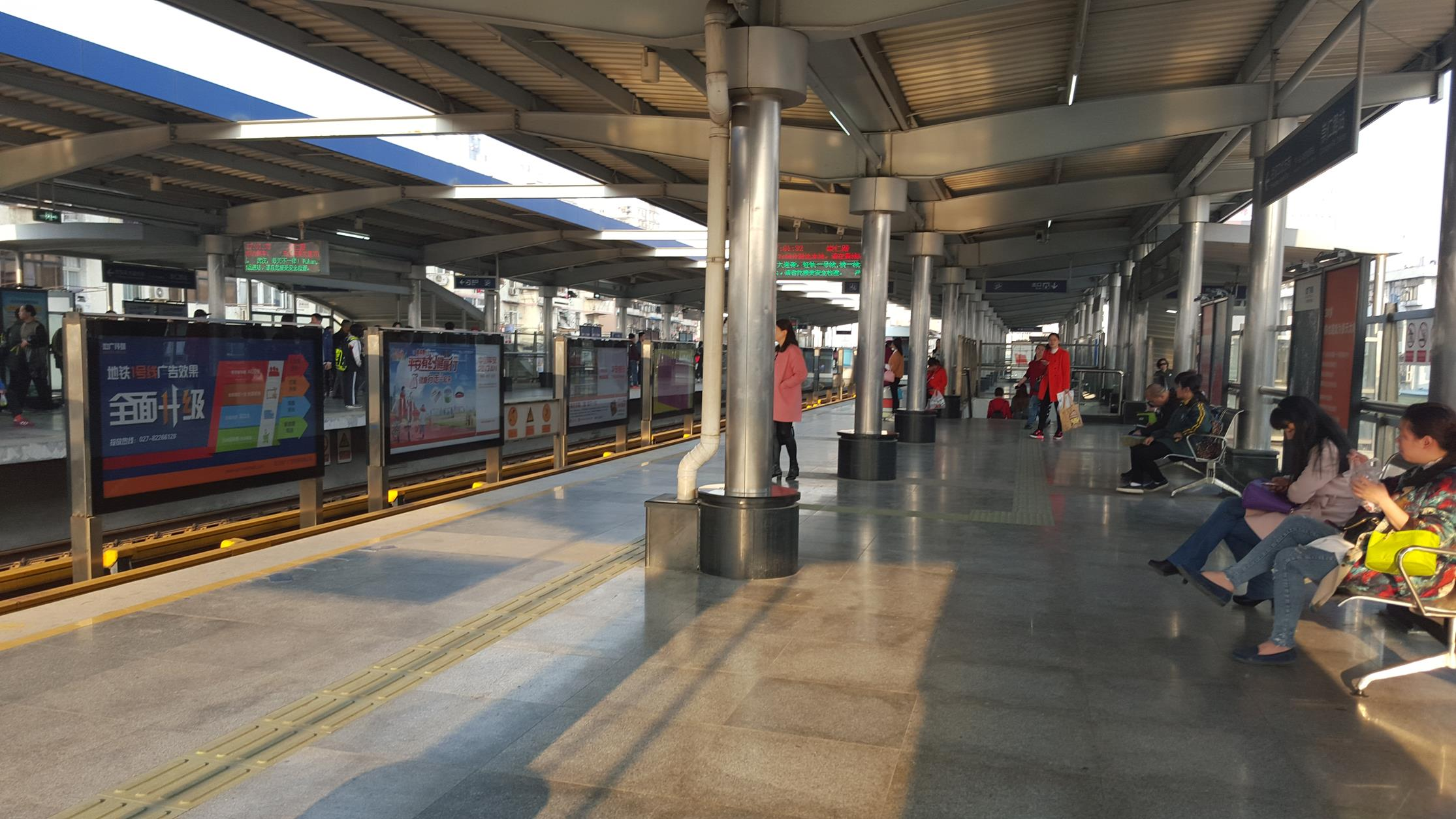
- Chongren Road station in March 2016

General information
- Location: Qiaokou District, Wuhan, Hubei; China
- Coordinates: 30°34′35″N 114°15′23″E
- Operated by: Wuhan Metro Co., Ltd
- Line: Line 1
- Platforms: 2 (2 side platforms)

Construction
- Structure type: Elevated

History
- Opened: July 28, 2004; 21 years ago (Line 1)

Services
Preceding station	Wuhan Metro	Following station
Qiaokou Road towards Jinghe	Line 1	Liji North Road towards Hankou North
Location

Chongren Road Station (Chinese: 崇仁路站) is a station of Line 1 of Wuhan Metro. It entered revenue service along with the completion of Line 1, Phase 1 on July 28, 2004. It is located in Qiaokou District.

== Station layout ==
3F	Side platform, doors open on the right
3F	Westbound	← Line 1 towards Jinghe (Qiaokou Road)
3F	Eastbound	Line 1 towards Hankou North (Liji North Road) →
3F	Side platform, doors open on the right
2F	Concourse	Faregates, Station Agent
G	Entrances and Exits

== Transfers ==
Bus transfers to Route 551, 622 and 808 are available at Chongren Road Station.
