= Qiaokou Road station =

Wuhan Metro station

Qiaokou Road 硚口路
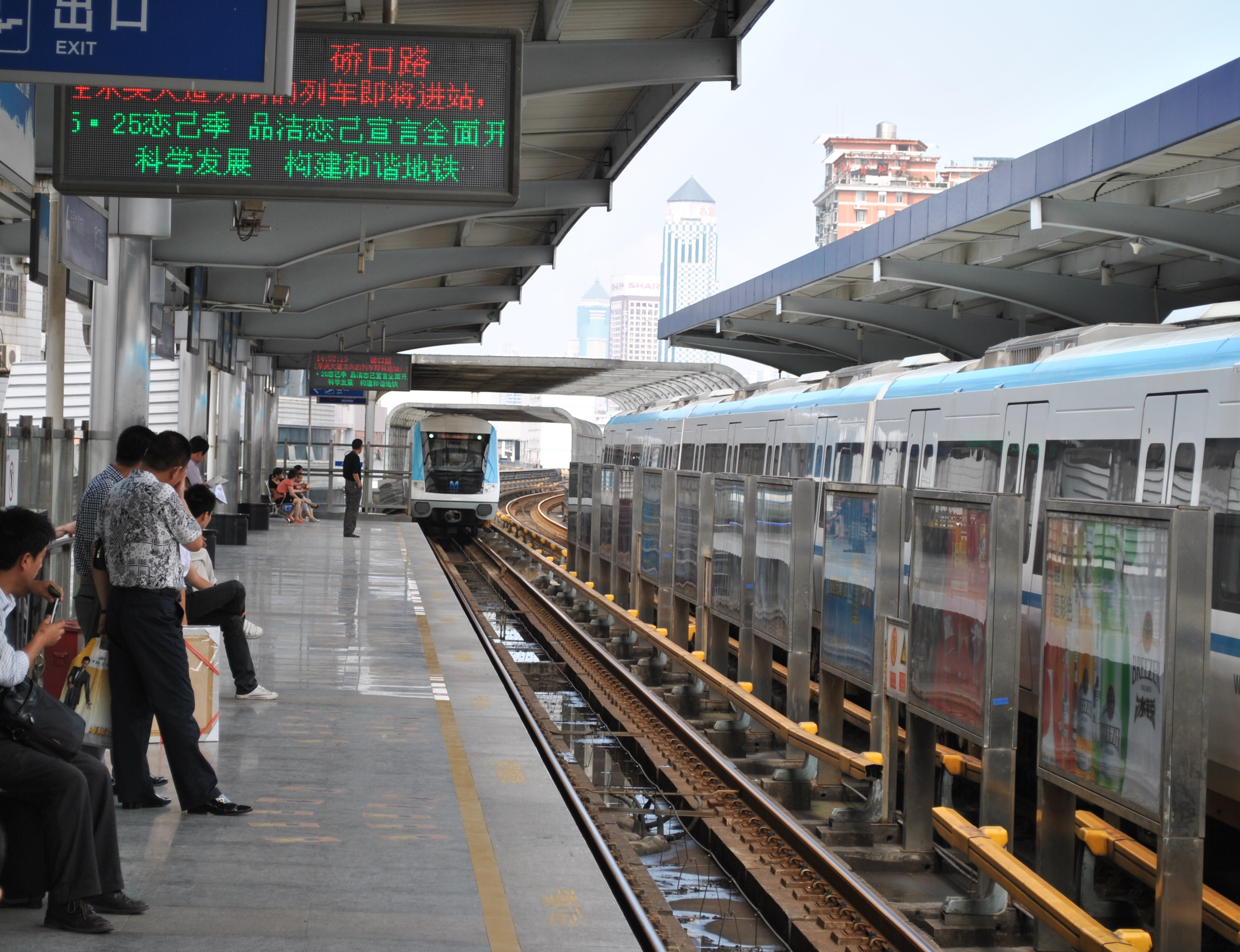

General information
- Location: Qiaokou District, Wuhan, Hubei; China
- Coordinates: 30°34′27″N 114°14′42″E
- Operated by: Wuhan Metro Co., Ltd
- Line: Line 1
- Platforms: 2 (2 side platforms)

Construction
- Structure type: Elevated

History
- Opened: July 28, 2004; 21 years ago (Line 1)

Services
Preceding station	Wuhan Metro	Following station
Taipingyang towards Jinghe	Line 1	Chongren Road towards Hankou North
Location

Qiaokou Road Station (Chinese: 硚口路站) is a station of Line 1 of Wuhan Metro. It entered revenue service along with the completion of Line 1, Phase 1 on July 28, 2004. It is located in Qiaokou District.

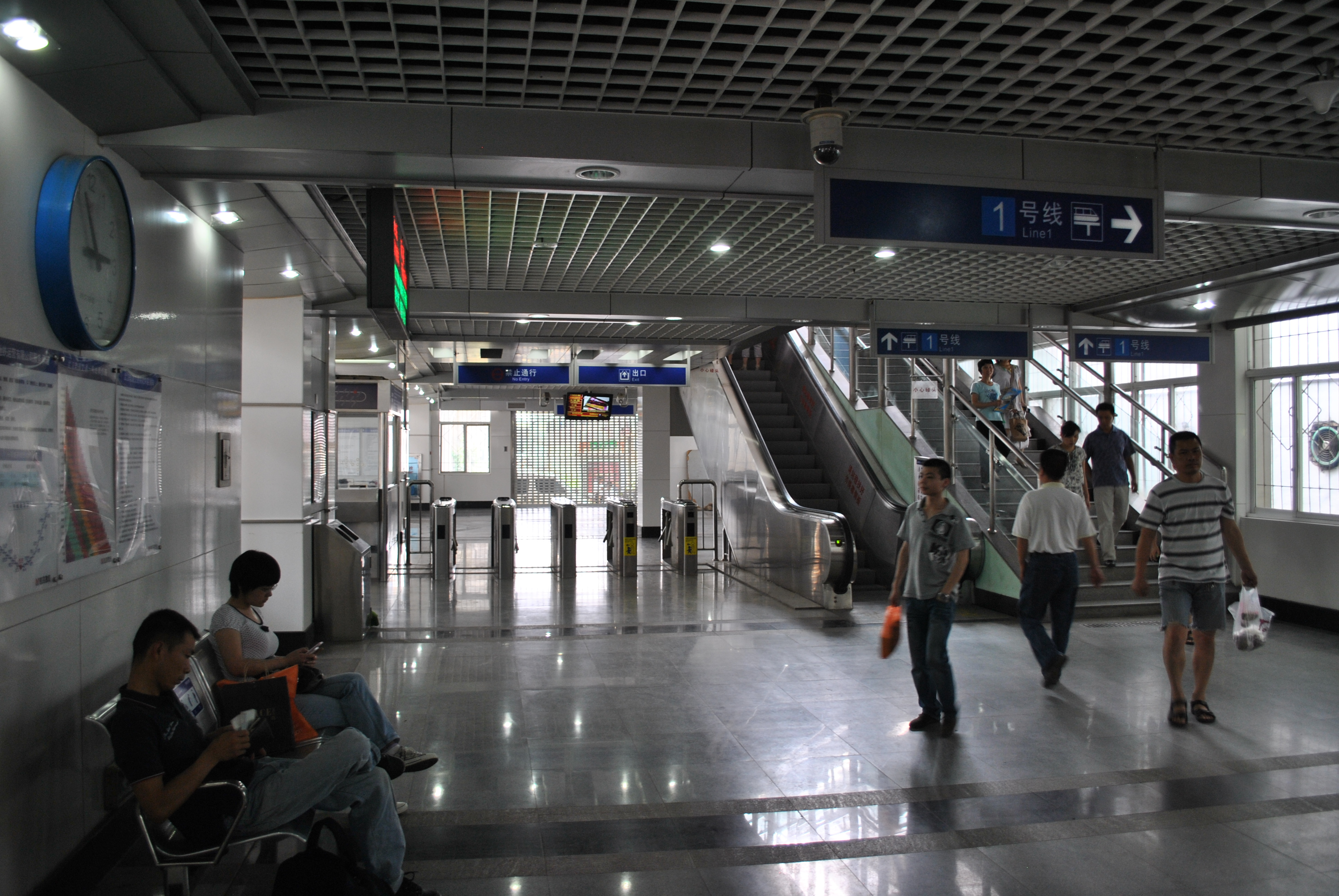
Station hall

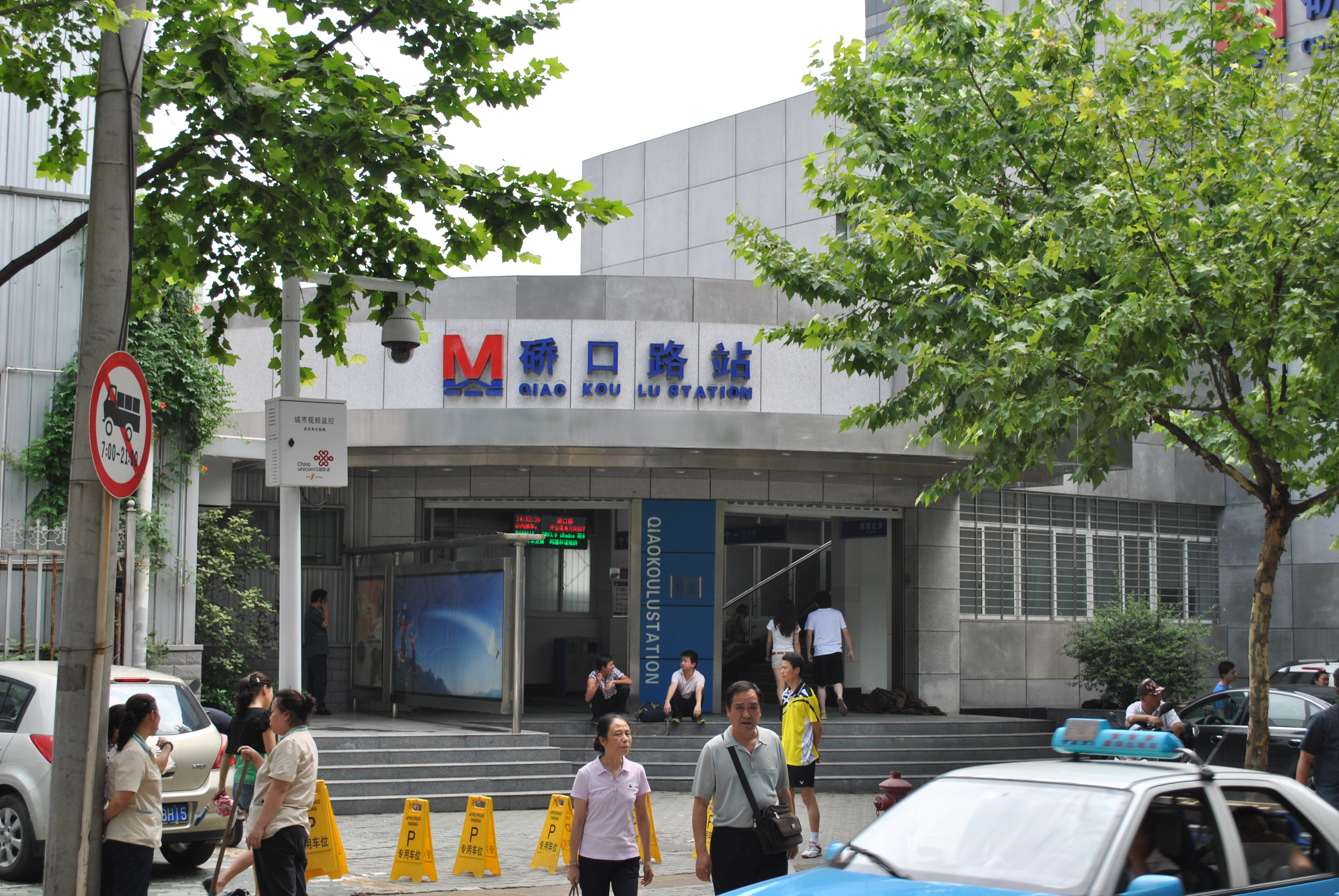
Exit

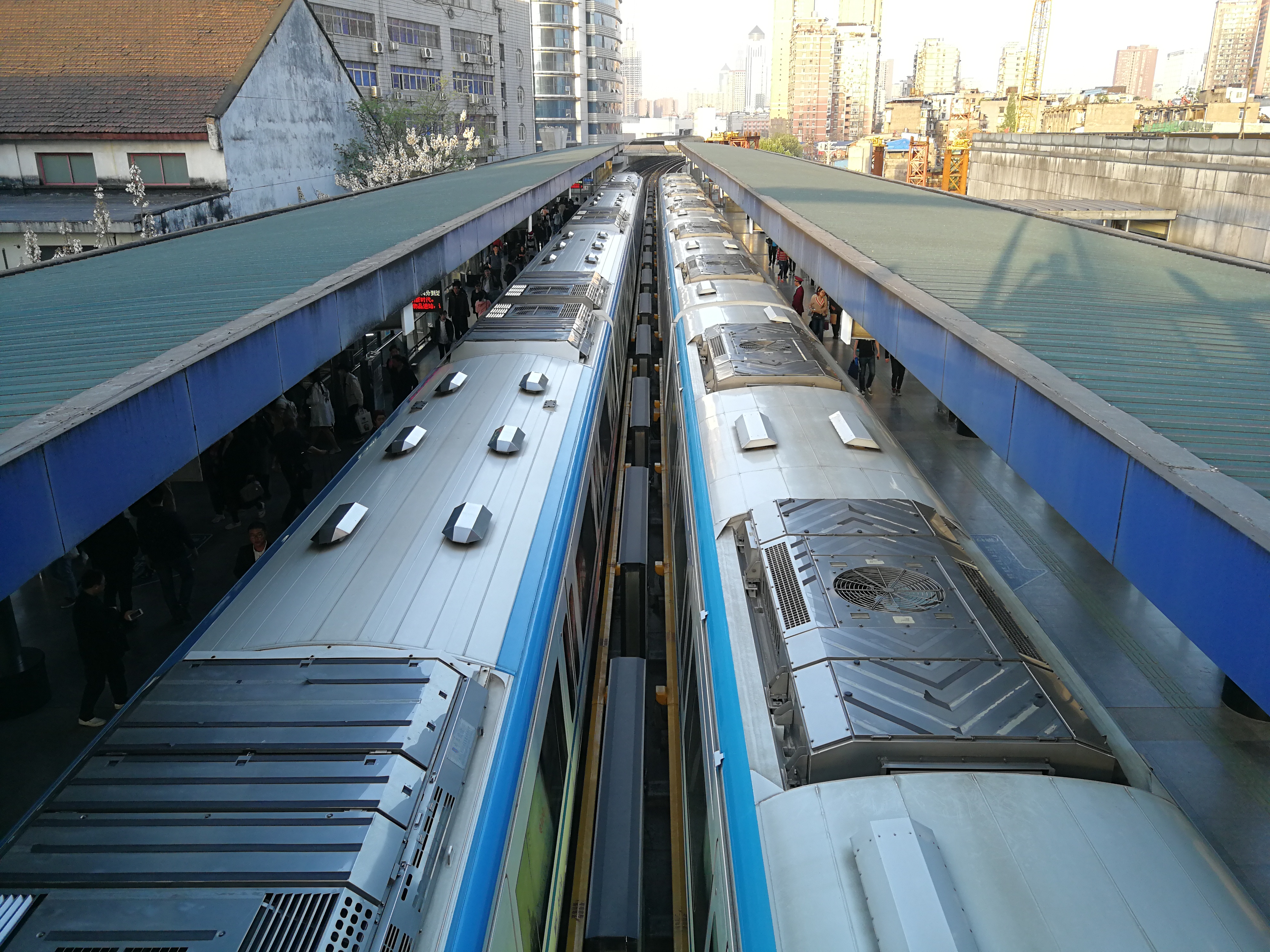
View from the walking bridge above the platforms

== Station layout ==
3F	Side platform, doors open on the right
3F	Westbound	← Line 1 towards Jinghe (Taipingyang)
3F	Eastbound	Line 1 towards Hankou North (Chongren Road) →
3F	Side platform, doors open on the right
2F	Concourse	Faregates, Station Agent
G	Entrances and Exits	Exits A-C

== Transfers ==
Bus transfers to Route T3, 79, 411, 520, 558, 588, 609, 622 and 737 are available at Qiaokou Road Station.
