= Youyi Road station (Wuhan Metro) =

Metro station in Wuhan, China

Youyi Road 友谊路 metro

General information
- Location: Jianghan District, Wuhan, Hubei; China
- Coordinates: 30°35′00″N 114°16′23″E
- Operated by: Wuhan Metro Co., Ltd
- Line: Line 1
- Platforms: 2 (2 side platforms)

Construction
- Structure type: Elevated

History
- Opened: July 28, 2004; 21 years ago (Line 1)

Services
Preceding station	Wuhan Metro	Following station
Liji North Road towards Jinghe	Line 1	Xunlimen towards Hankou North
Location

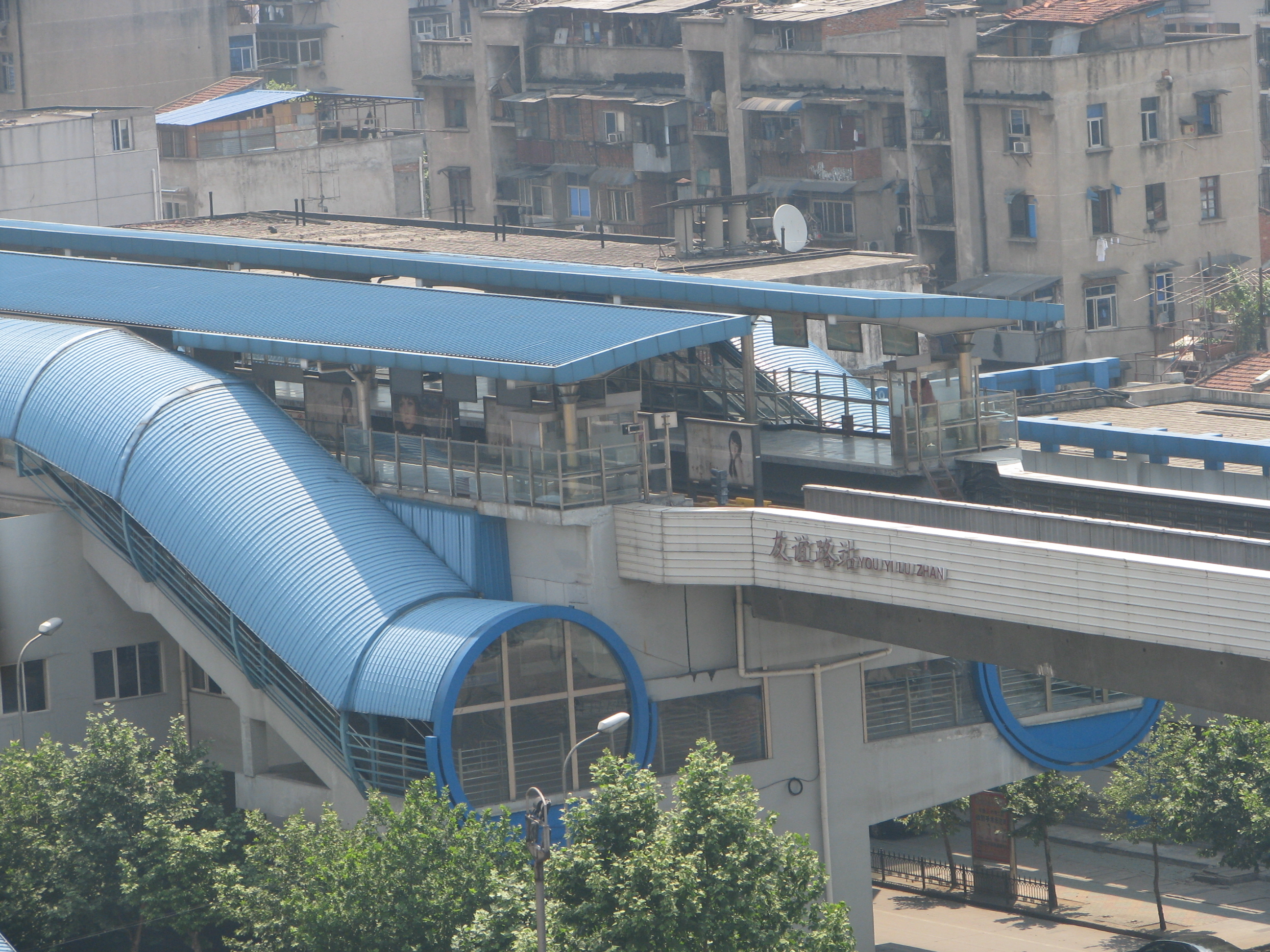
Exit

Youyi Road Station (Chinese: 友谊路站) is a station of Line 1 of Wuhan Metro. It entered revenue service along with the completion of Line 1, Phase 1 on July 28, 2004. It is located in Jianghan District.

== Station layout ==
3F	Side platform, doors open on the right
3F	Westbound	← Line 1 towards Jinghe (Liji North Road)
3F	Eastbound	Line 1 towards Hankou North (Xunlimen) →
3F	Side platform, doors open on the right
2F	Concourse	Faregates, Station Agent
G	Entrances and Exits	Exits A, B

== Transfers ==
Bus transfers to Route 1, 2, 505, 571, 592, 622, 526, 527, 553, 592, 595, 601, 207, 507, 532, 535, 548, 561, 563, 721 and 803 are available at Youyi Road Station.
