= Xunlimen station =

Wuhan Metro station

Xunlimen 循礼门
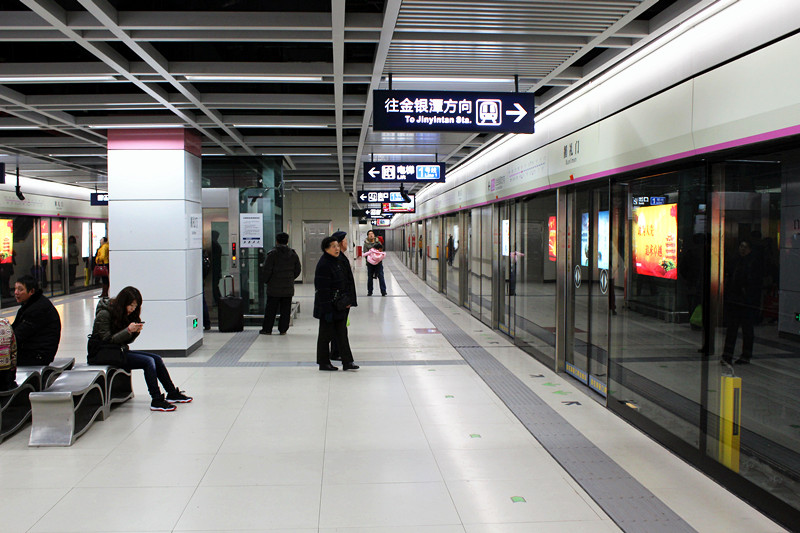
- Line 2 platform

General information
- Location: Jianghan District, Wuhan, Hubei; China
- Coordinates: 30°35′17″N 114°16′54″E
- Operated by: Wuhan Metro Co., Ltd
- Lines: Line 1; Line 2
- Platforms: 4 (1 island platform, 2 side platforms)

Construction
- Structure type: Underground and elevated

History
- Opened: July 28, 2004; 21 years ago (Line 1); December 28, 2012; 13 years ago (Line 2)

Services
| Preceding station | Wuhan Metro | Following station |
|---|---|---|
| Youyi Road towards Jinghe | Line 1 | Dazhi Road towards Hankou North |
| Zhongshan Park towards Tianhe International Airport | Line 2 | Jianghan Road towards Fozuling |
Location

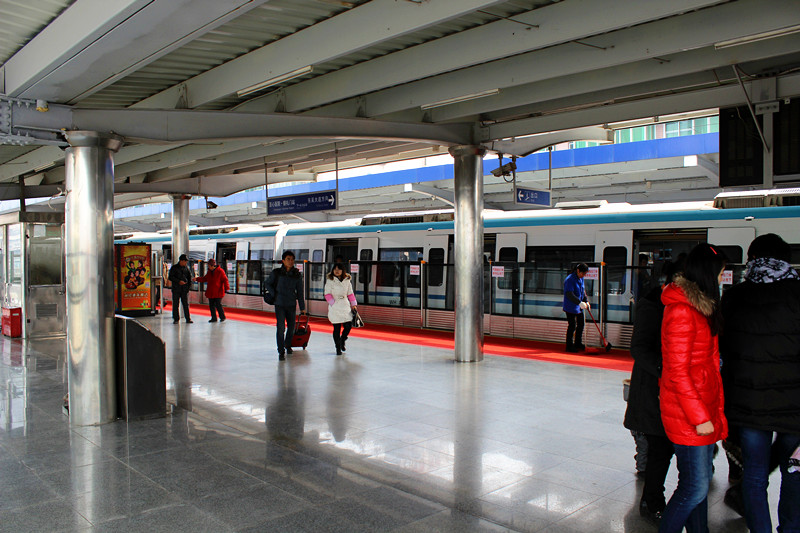
Line 1 platform

Xunlimen Station (Chinese: 循礼门站; pinyin: Xúnlǐmén Zhàn) is an interchange station between Line 1 and Line 2 of the Wuhan Metro. It entered revenue service along with the completion of Line 1 (Phase 1) on July 28, 2004. The Line 2 platforms opened on December 28, 2012. It is located between Jianghan District and Jiangan District.

This station was sponsored by Wuhan Asia Heart disease Hospital (武汉亚洲心脏病医院), but the sponsorship has ended.

== Station layout ==
| 3F | Side platform, doors will open on the right |
| 3F | Westbound | ← Line 1 towards Jinghe (Youyi Road) |
| 3F | Eastbound | Line 1 towards Hankou North (Dazhi Road) → |
| 3F | Side platform, doors will open on the right |
| 2F | Concourse | Faregates, Station Agent |
| G | Entrances and Exits | Exits A-E |
| B1 | Councourse | Faregates, Station Agent |
| B2 | Northbound | ← Line 2 towards Tianhe International Airport (Zhongshan Park) |
| B2 | Island platform, doors will open on the left |
| B2 | Southbound | Line 2 towards Fozuling (Jianghan Road) → |

=== Line 1 ===
The Line 1 elevated station is located on Jinghan Boulevard.

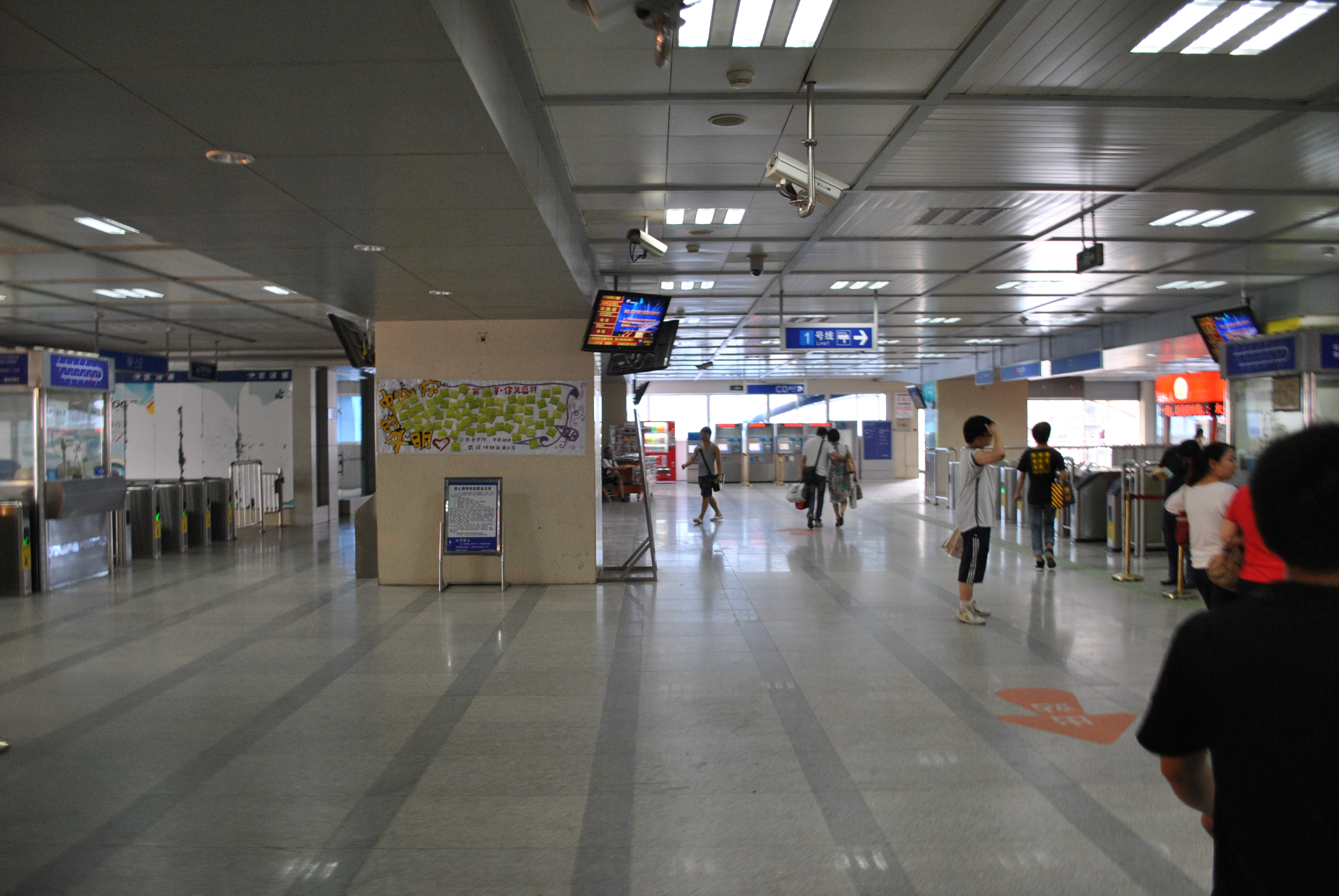
Station hall

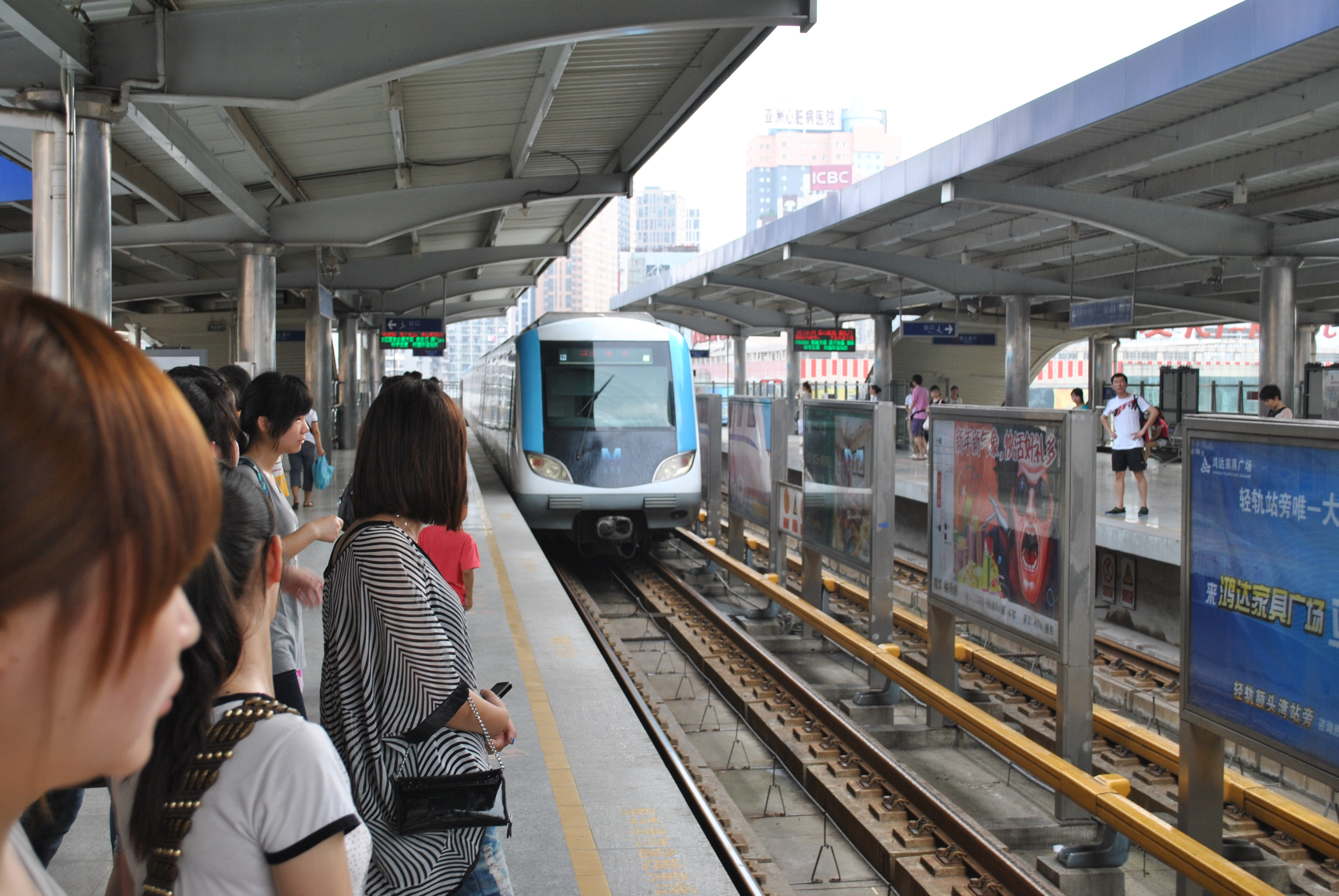
Platform

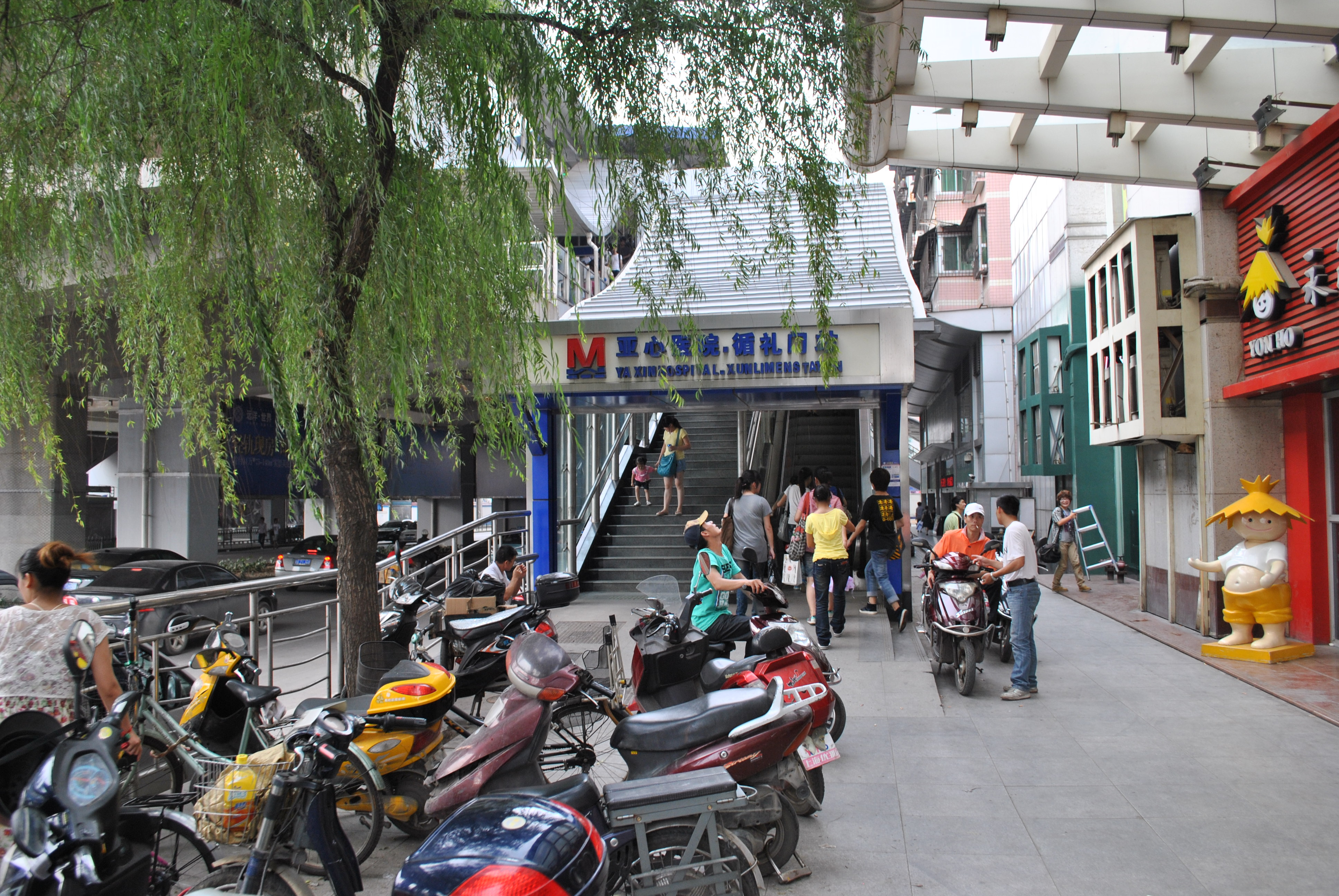
Exit

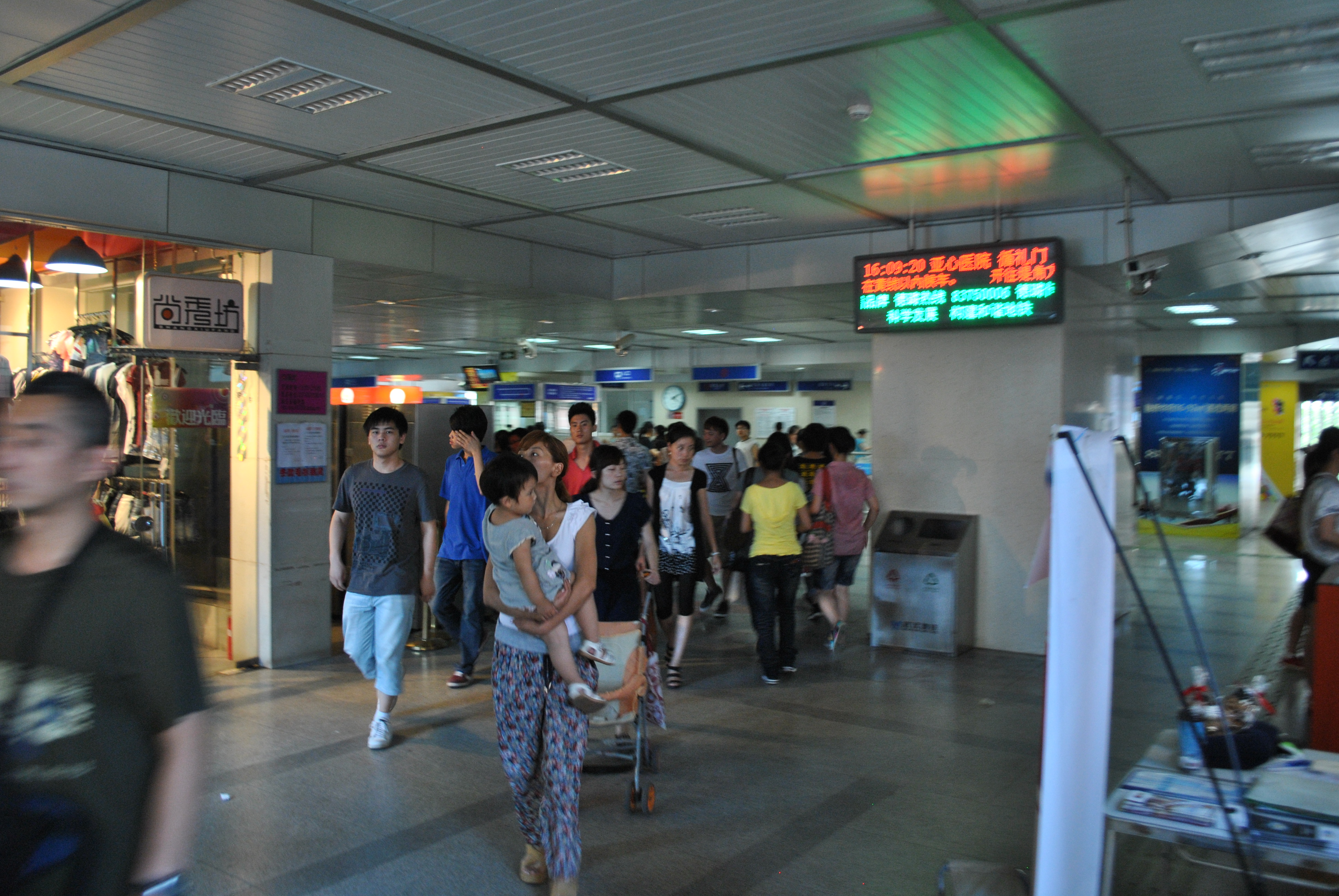
Station hall

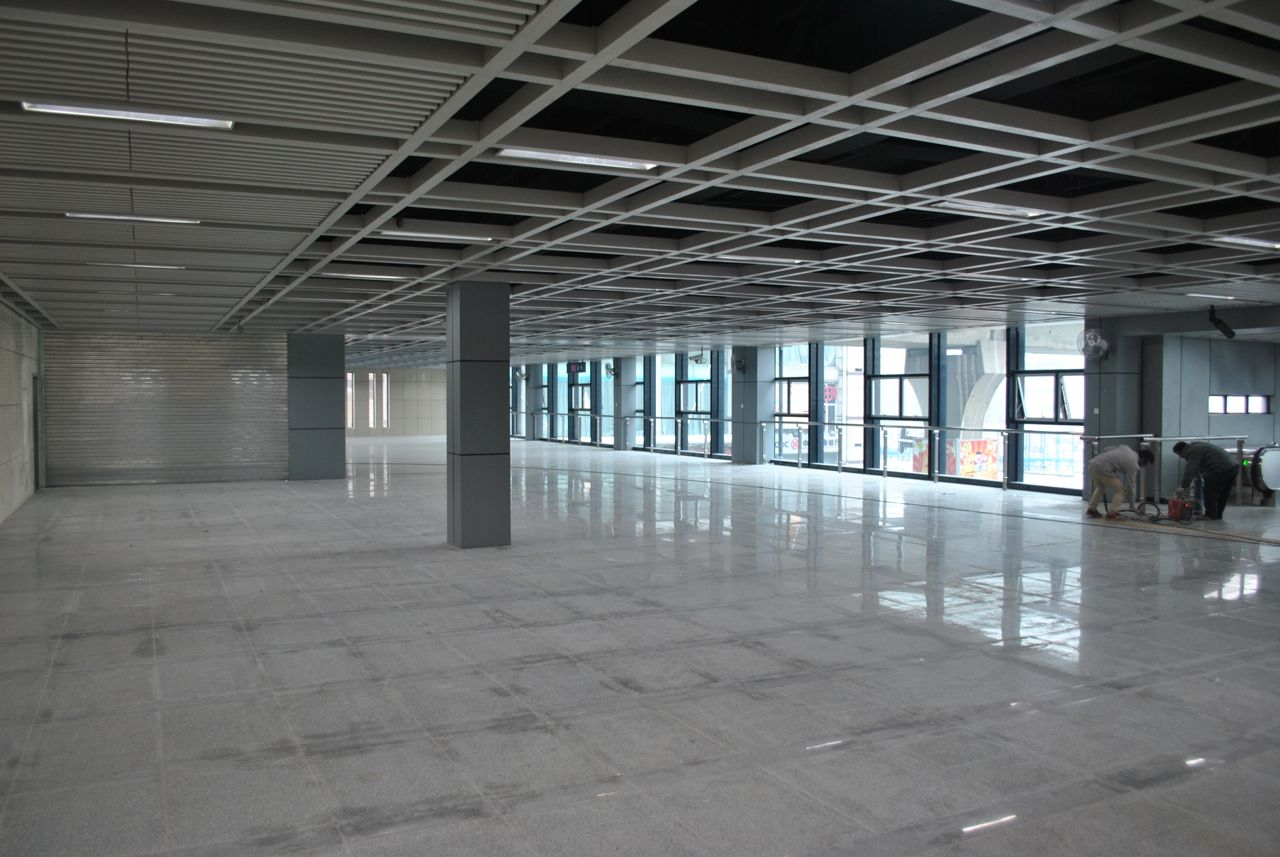
Interchange hall

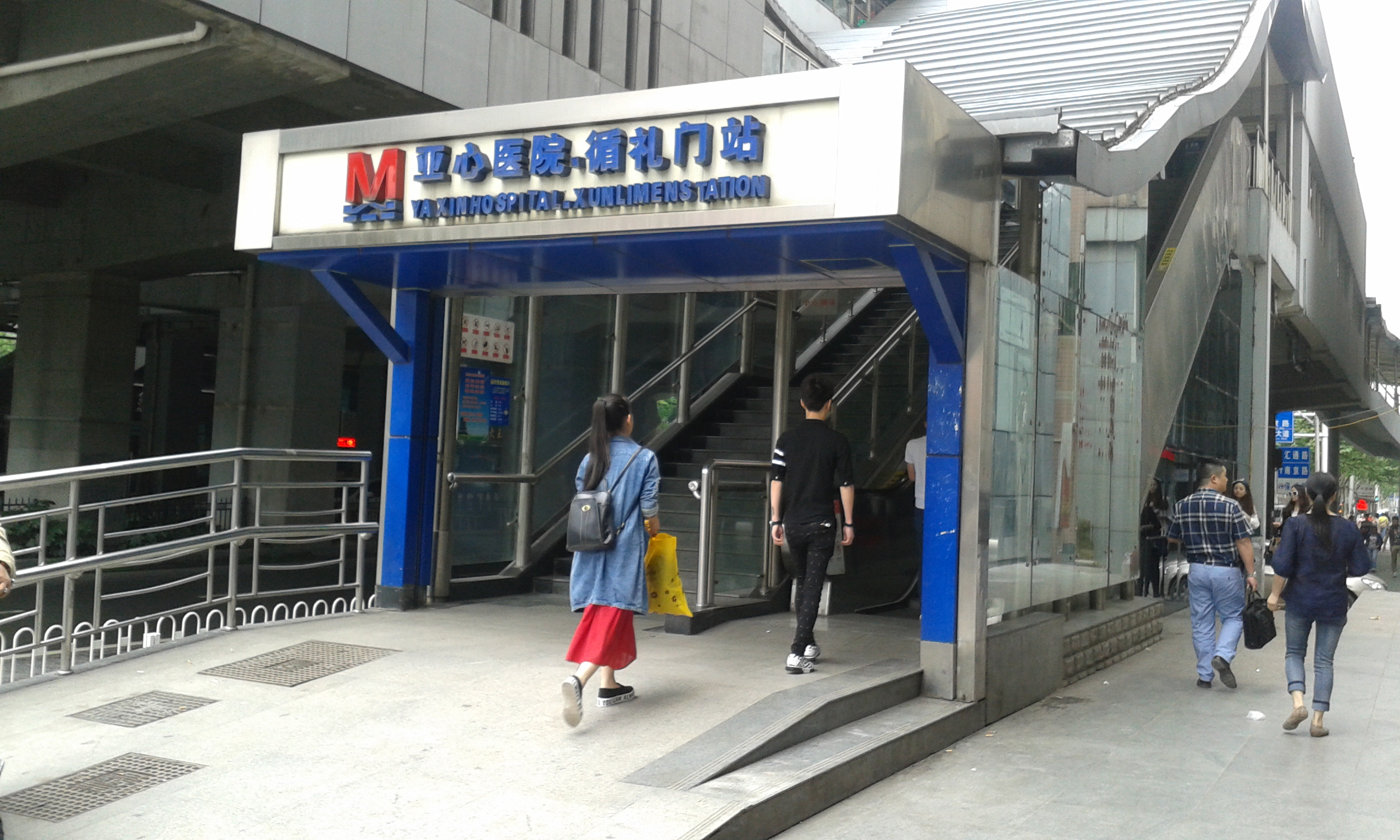
Entrance A

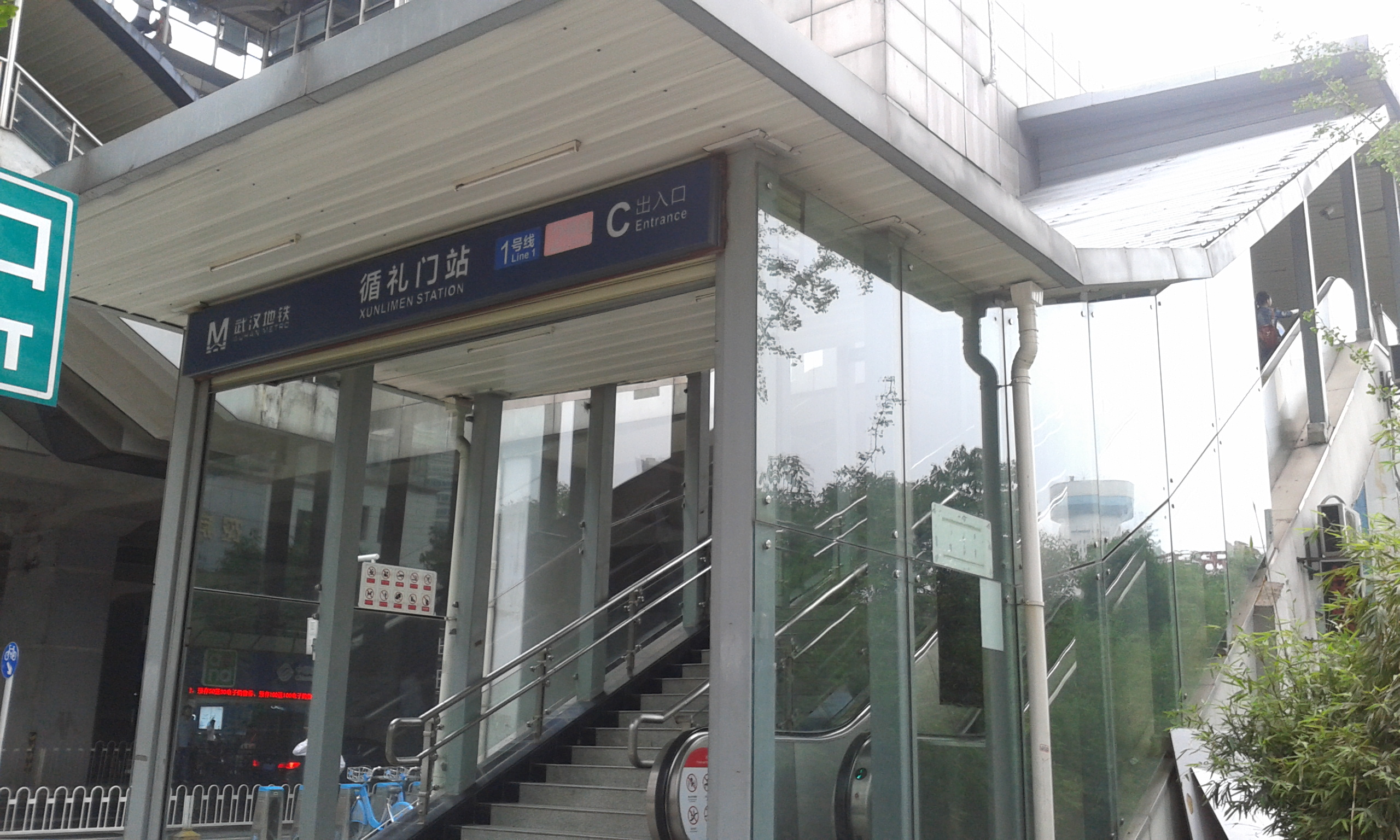
Entrance C

=== Line 2 ===
The Line 2 underground station is located on Jianghan Road.

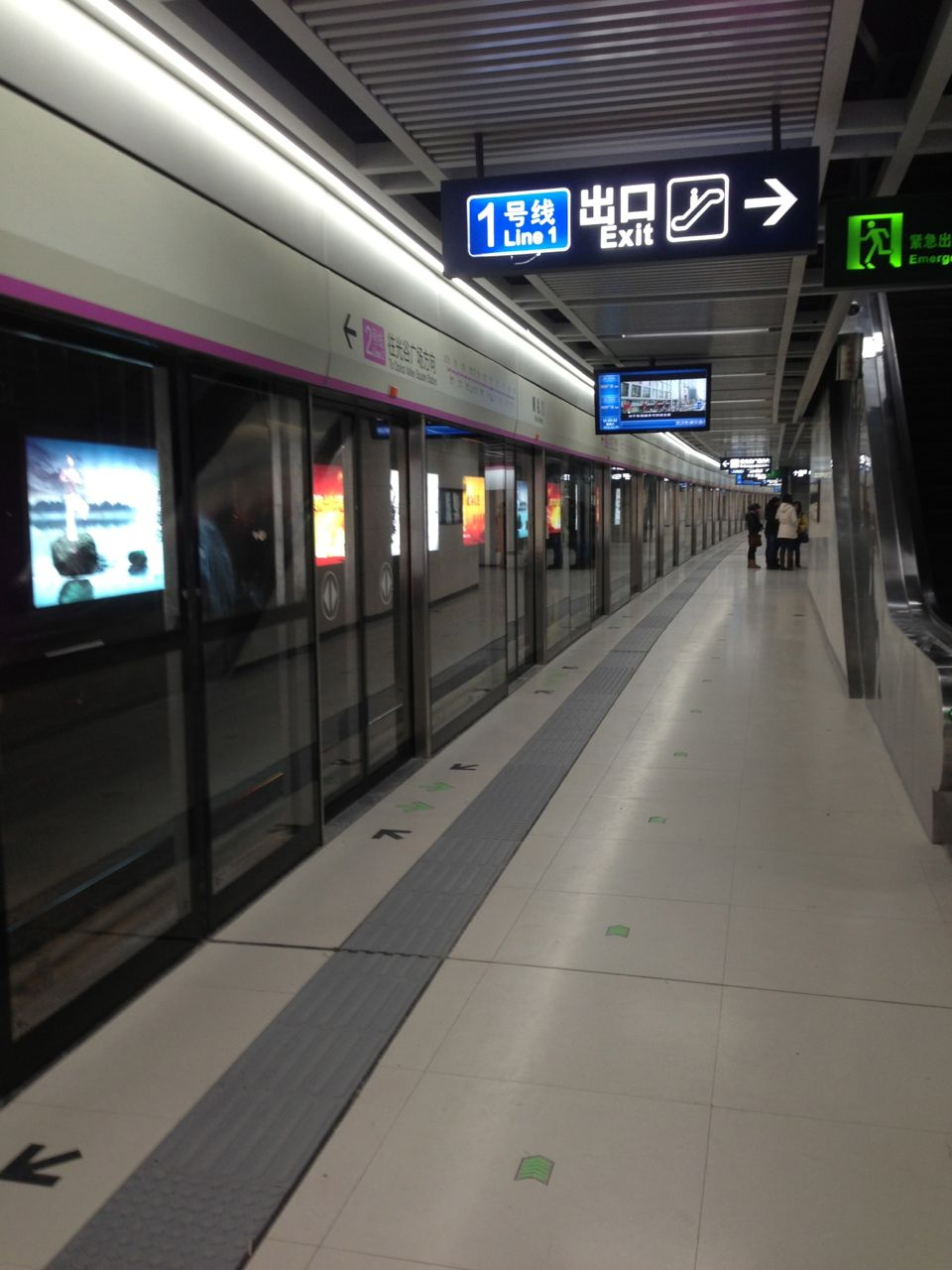
Platform

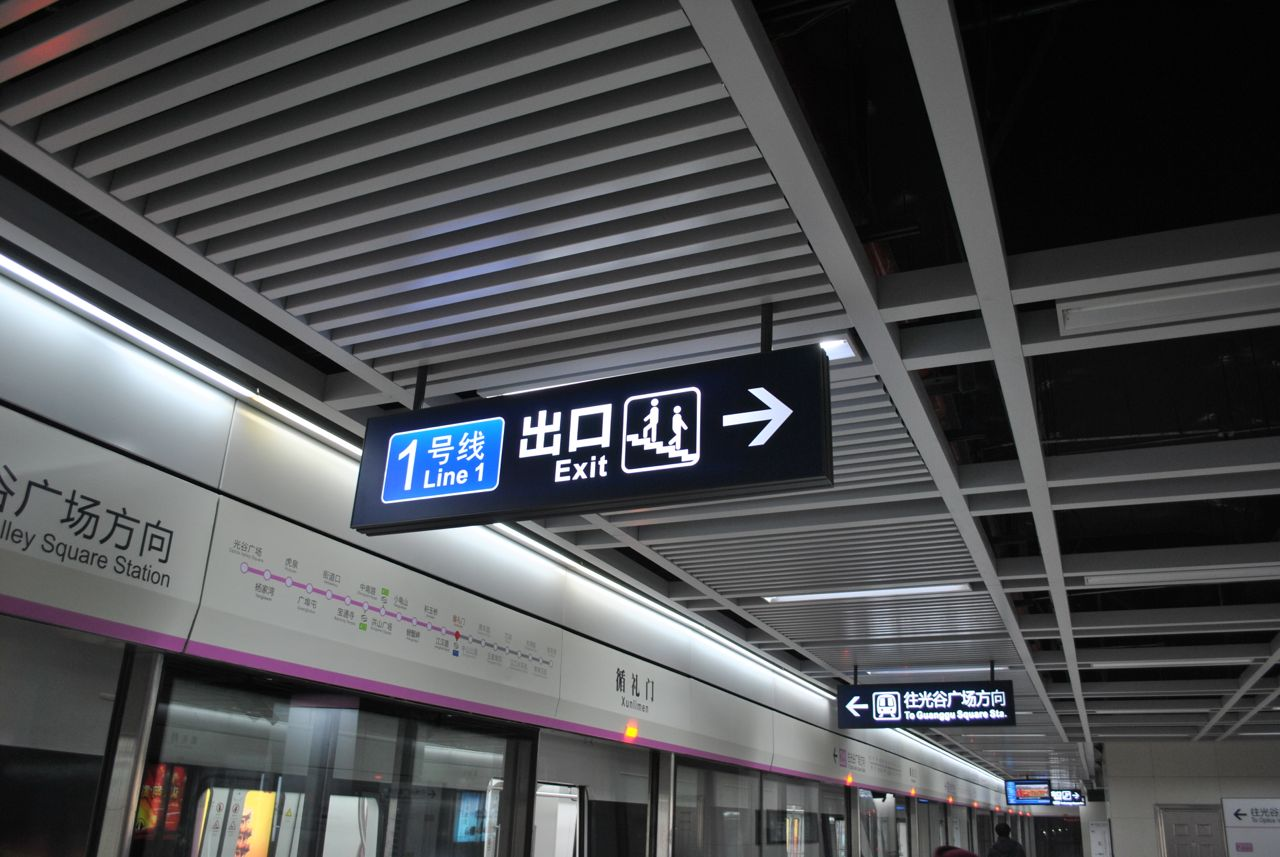
Interchange information

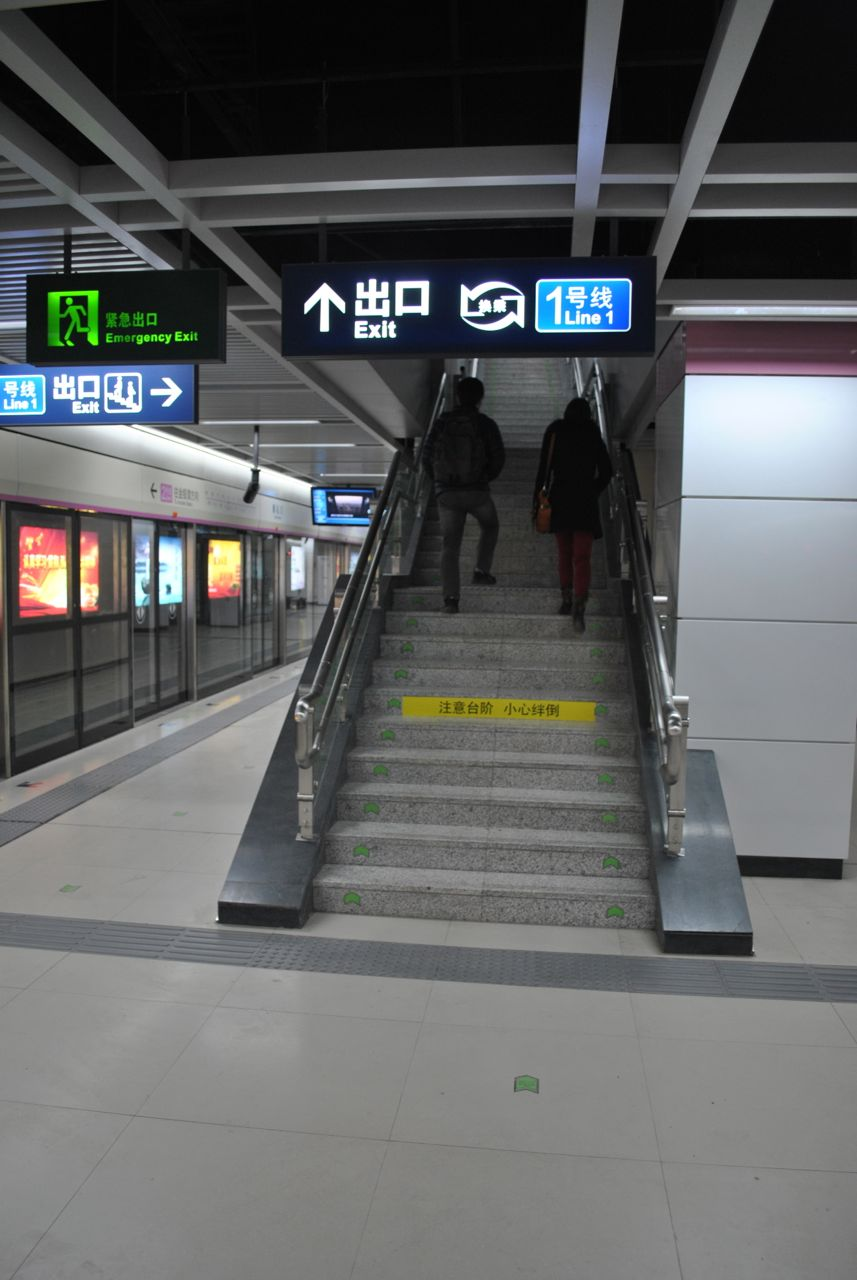
Stair

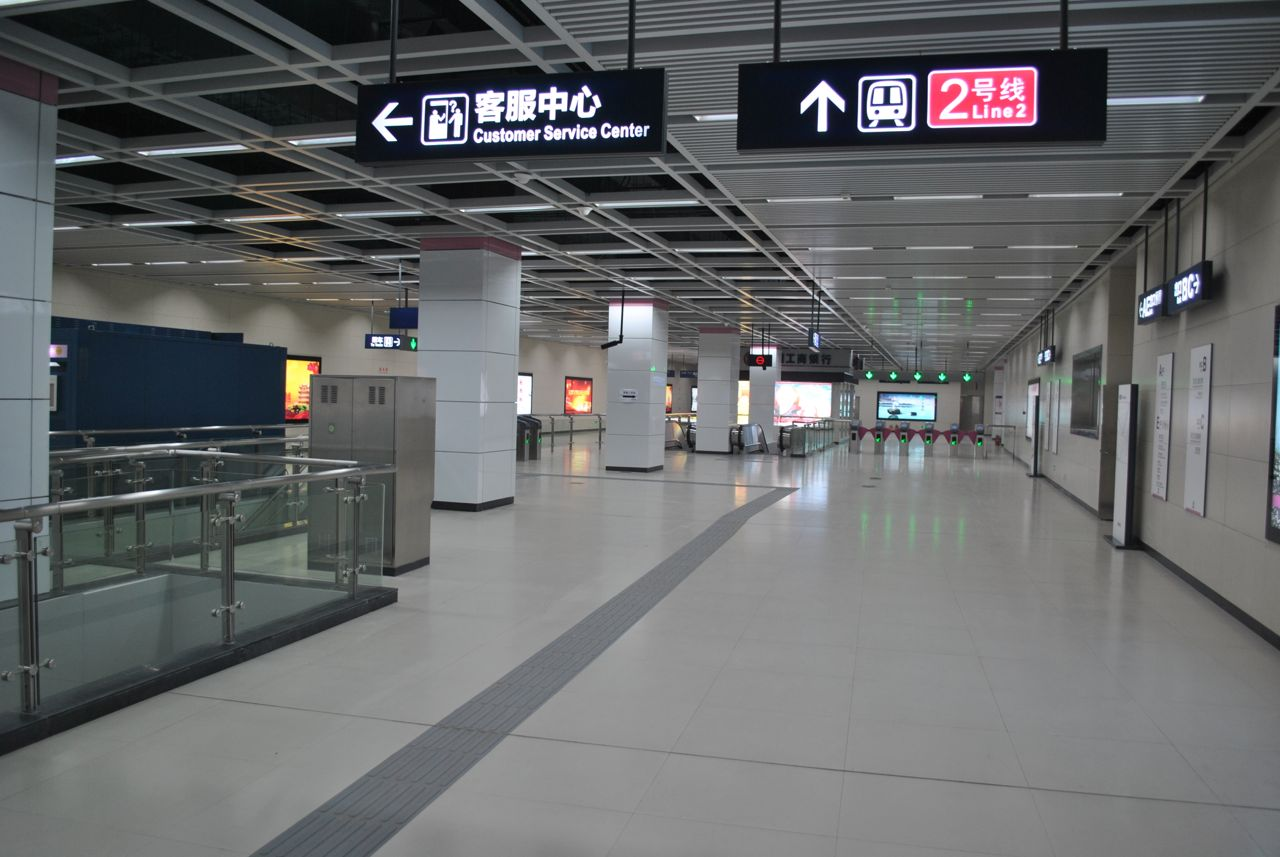
Station hall

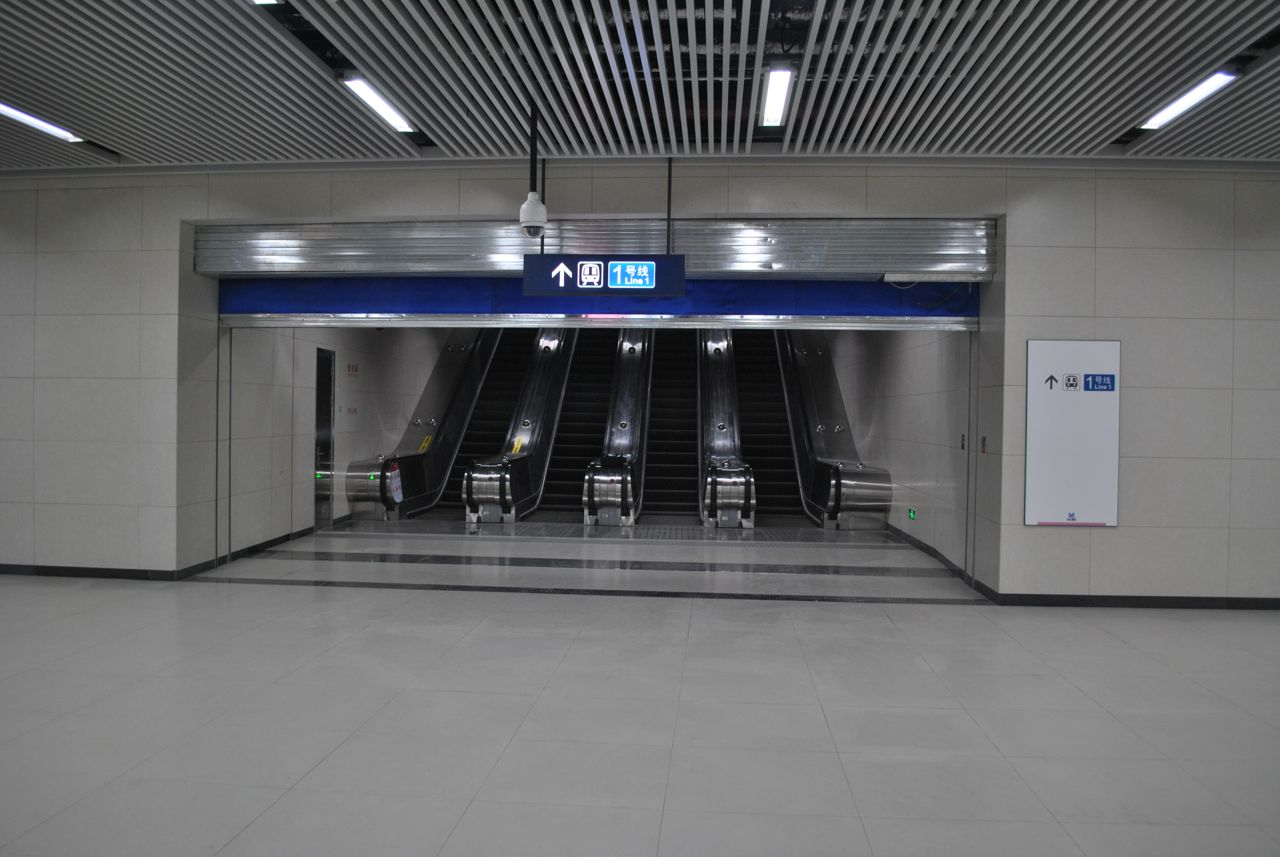
Interchange Channel

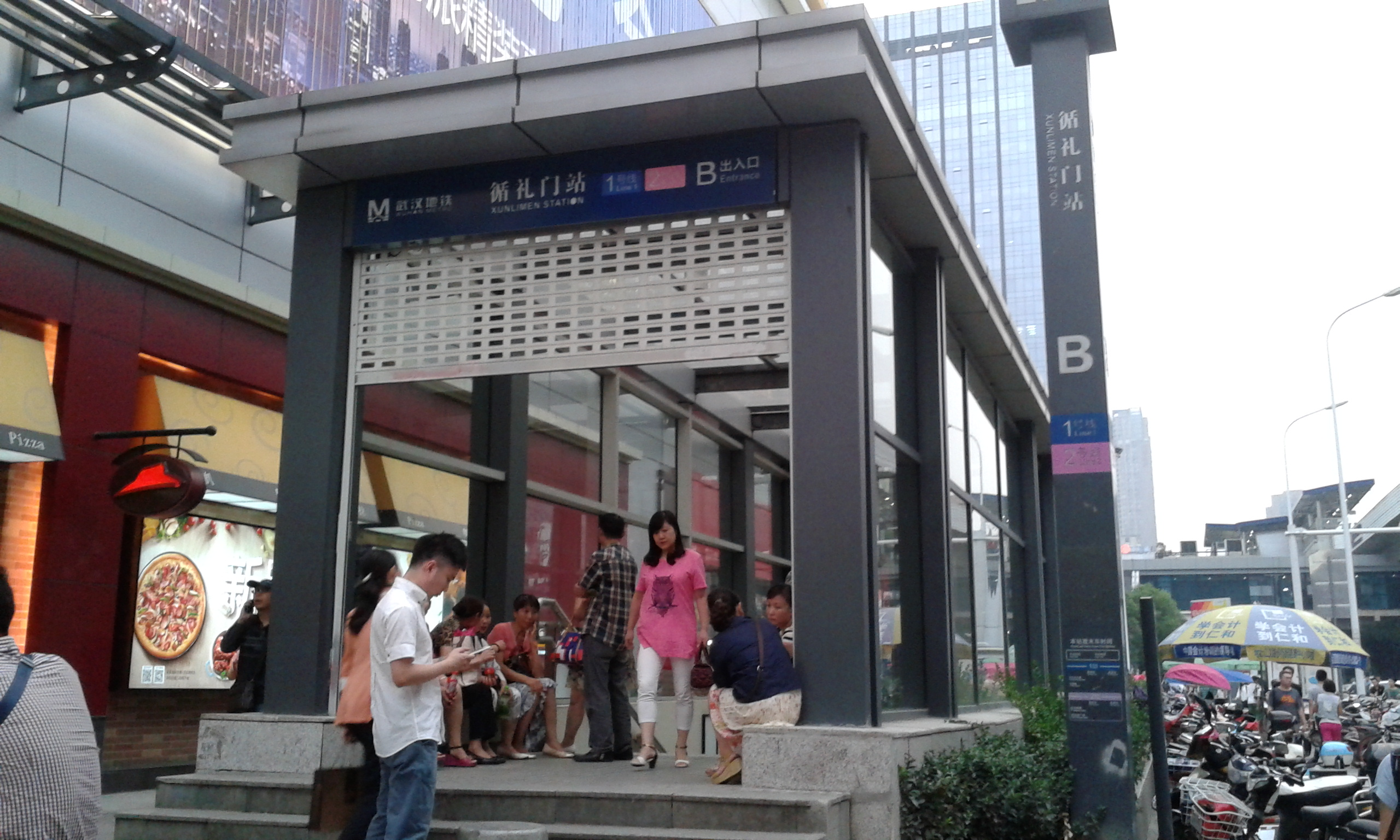
Entrance B

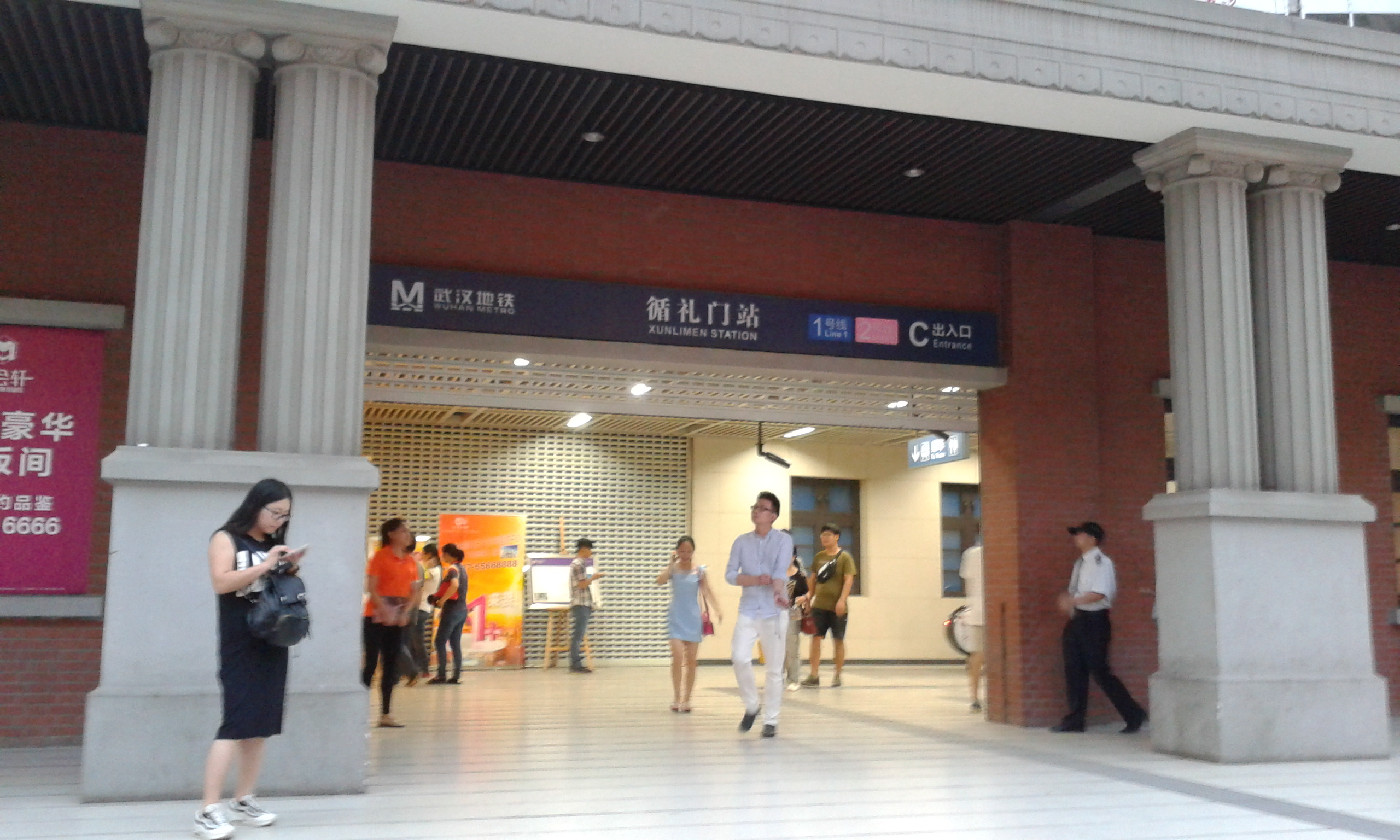
Entrance C

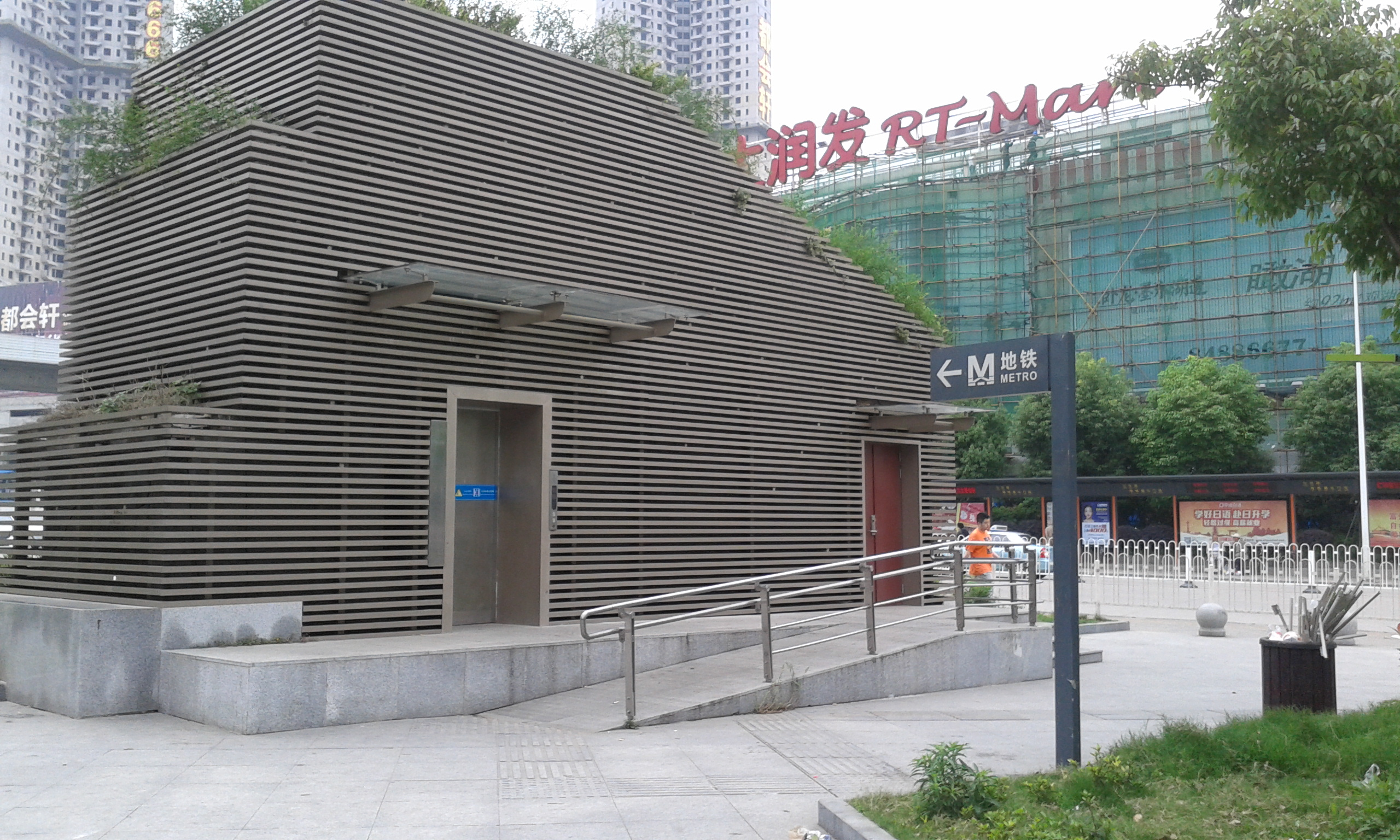
Elevator at Entrance E

== Other ==
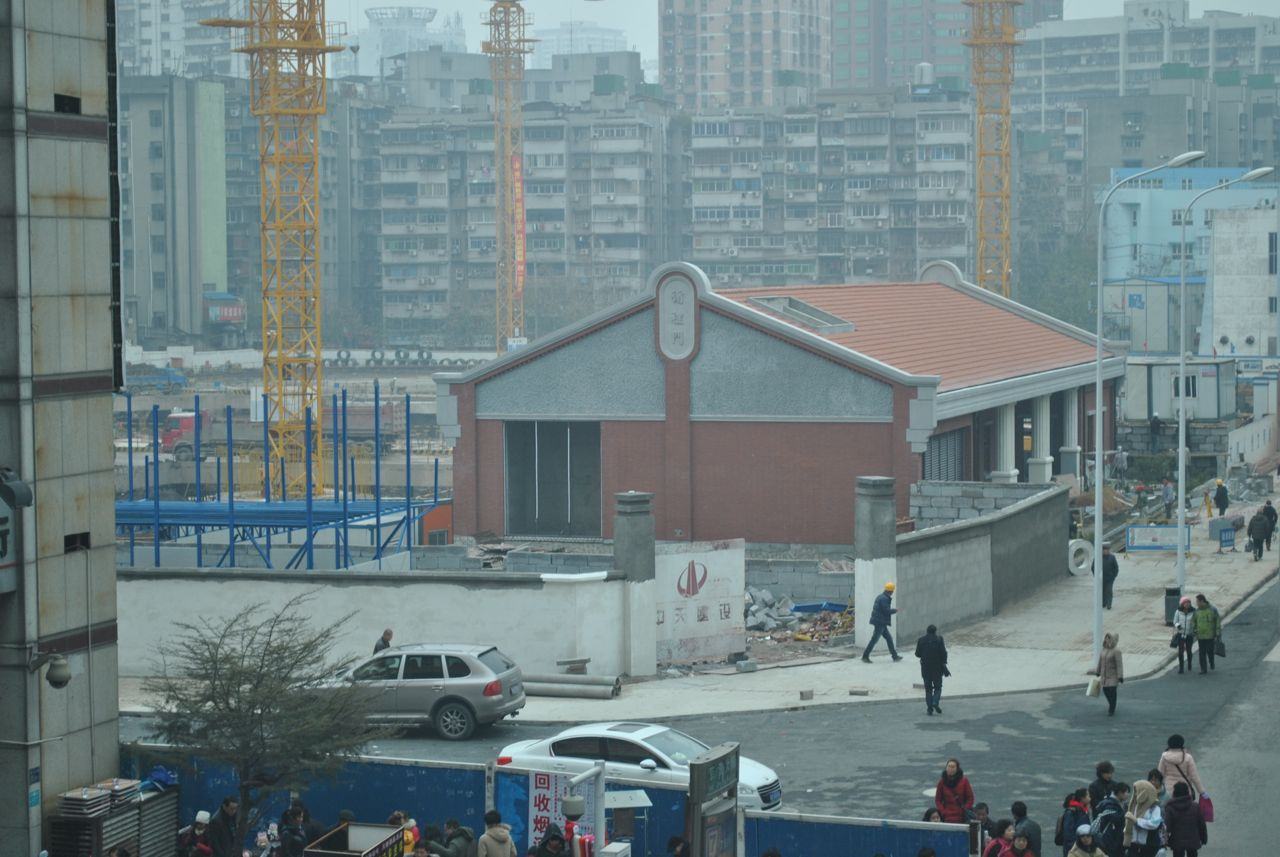
Xunlimen Railway Station, now is Line 2 exits.

Line 2's exits are the old place of Xunlimen Railway Station.

== Transfers ==
Bus transfers to Route 622, 553, 526, 533, 622, 532, 548, 601 and 592 are available at Xunlimen Station.

The bus stops near the station are 江汉路地铁循礼门站, 京汉大道地铁循礼门站.
