= Liji North Road station =

Wuhan Metro station

Liji North Road 利济北路
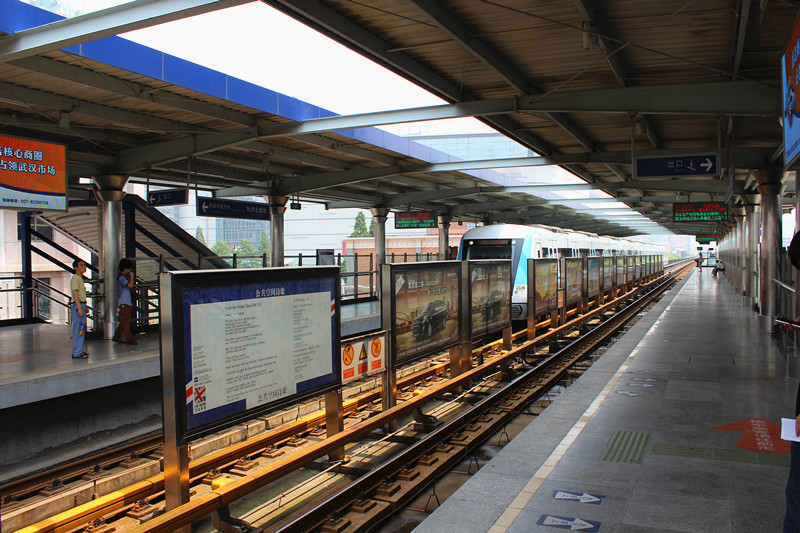

General information
- Location: Qiaokou District, Wuhan, Hubei; China
- Coordinates: 30°35′00″N 114°16′23″E
- Operated by: Wuhan Metro Co., Ltd
- Line: Line 1
- Platforms: 2 (2 side platforms)

Construction
- Structure type: Elevated

History
- Opened: July 28, 2004; 21 years ago (Line 1)

Services
Preceding station	Wuhan Metro	Following station
Chongren Road towards Jinghe	Line 1	Youyi Road towards Hankou North
Location

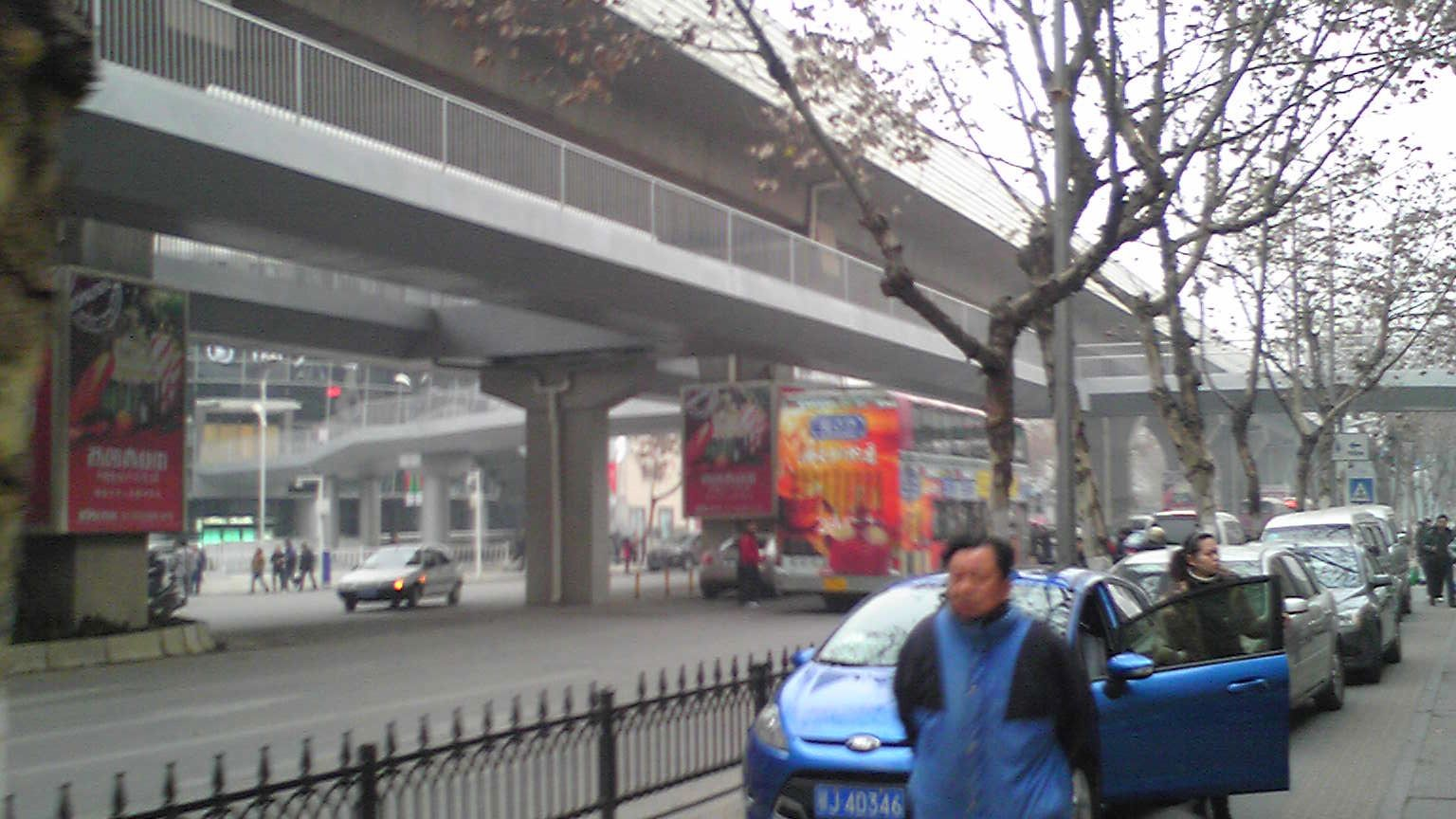
A flyover to Wuhan International Square.

Liji North Road Station (Chinese: 利济北路站) is a station on Line 1 of the Wuhan Metro. It entered revenue service along with the completion of Line 1, Phase 1 on July 28, 2004. It is located in Qiaokou District.

The station has a flyover to Wuhan International Square.

== Station layout ==
3F	Side platform, doors open on the right
3F	Westbound	← Line 1 towards Jinghe (Chongren Road)
3F	Eastbound	Line 1 towards Hankou North (Youyi Road) →
3F	Side platform, doors open on the right
2F	Concourse	Faregates, Station Agent
G	Entrances and Exits

== Transfers ==
Bus transfers to Route 47, 69, 291, 519, 575, 592, 622, 703, 705 and 726 are available at Liji North Road Station.
