= Taihe, Hubei =

Taihe 太和镇
- Town
- Location in Hubei
- Coordinates: 30°5′46″N 114°40′31″E
- Country: People's Republic of China
- Province: Hubei
- Prefecture-level city: Ezhou
- District: Liangzihu District
- Time zone: UTC+8 (China Standard)

Taihe (Chinese: 太和; pinyin: Tàihé) is a town under the administration of Liangzihu District, Ezhou, Hubei, China. As of 2020, it administers Taihe Residential Community and the following 21 villages:

- Bohao Village (伯浩村)
- Chaoying Village (朝英村)
- Chentai Village (陈太村)
- Dongbianzhu Village (东边朱村)
- Hujin Village (胡进村)
- Huahe Village (花贺村)
- Huahuang Village (花黄村)
- Jinli Village (金坜村)
- Malong Village (马龙村)
- Niushi Village (牛石村)
- Nongke Village (农科村)
- Qiushan Village (邱山村)
- Shanghong Village (上洪村)
- Shizikou Village (狮子口村)
- Xiebu Village (谢埠村)
- Xinjian Village (新建村)
- Xinwu Village (新屋村)
- Zitan Village (子坛村)
- Kefan Village (柯畈村)
- Xincheng Village (新城村)
- Xiepei Village (谢培村)
