= Huangshan (disambiguation) =

Huangshan (Yellow Mountain, Mount Huang) is a scenic mountain range and UNESCO World Heritage Site in Anhui, China.

Huangshan may also refer to:

- Huangshan City, a prefecture-level city near the Huangshan Mountains
- Huangshan District, a district of Huangshan City
- Huangshan Pine, a tree native to eastern China's mountains
- Huangshan, a village in Shawo Township, Echeng District, Ezhou, Hubei
