= Bishi, Hubei =

Bishidu 碧石镇
- Town
- Location in Hubei
- Coordinates: 30°17′43″N 114°51′36″E
- Country: People's Republic of China
- Province: Hubei
- Prefecture-level city: Ezhou
- District: Echeng
- Village-level divisions: 1 residential community 10 villages
- Elevation: 23 m (75 ft)
- Time zone: UTC+8 (China Standard)
- Area code: 0711

Bishidu (Chinese: 碧石; pinyin: Bìshí) is a town of Echeng District, Ezhou, Hubei, People's Republic of China, located about 11 kilometres (6.8 mi) south-southwest of downtown Ezhou and is served by China National Highway 106.

== Geography ==
=== Administrative divisions ===
As of 2011, it had one residential community (居委会) and 10 villages under its administration. As of 2016, Bishi administered:

#	Name (Standard Mandarin)	Chinese (S)
Residential Committee
1	Wugang Kuangshan Jixiu	武钢矿山机修居委会
Villages
2	Bishi	碧石村
3	Hongqiao	虹桥村
4	Huangzui	黄咀村
5	Jinpen	金盆村
6	Jinwenwu	金文武村
7	Libian	李边村 (李家边村)
8	Lijing	李镜村
9	Luwan	卢湾村
10	Nonghuishan / Longhuishan	农会山村 (龙会山村)
11	Zhangshuling	樟术岭村

== Demographics ==
Historical population
Year	Pop.	±% p.a.
2000	28,762	—
2010	24,979	−1.40%

== See also ==
- List of township-level divisions of Hubei
