= Echeng, Ezhou =

Echeng 鄂城区 Ocheng
- District
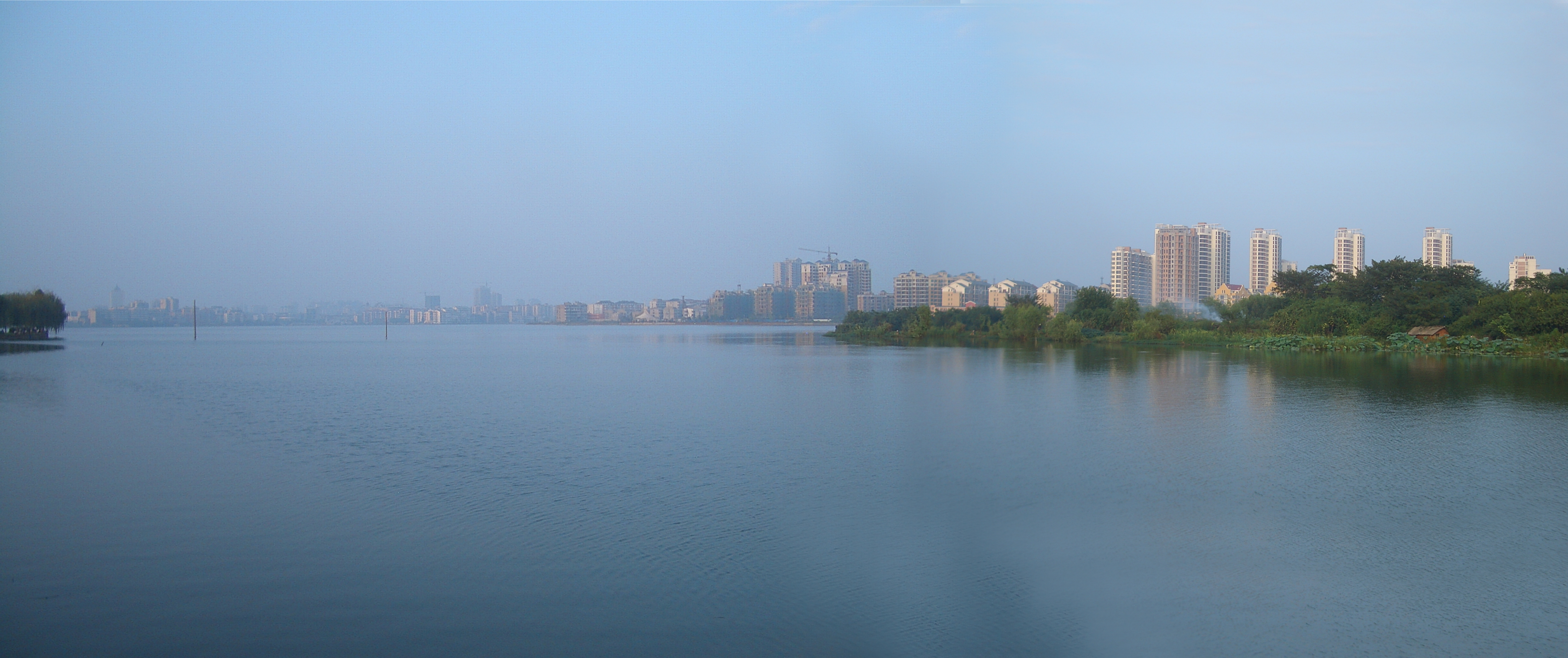
- Yanglan Lake (洋澜湖) in Echeng District

- Location in Hubei
- Coordinates (Echeng District government): 30°24′02″N 114°53′30″E
- Country: China
- Province: Hubei
- Prefecture-level city: Ezhou
- District seat: Fenghuang Subdistrict

Area
  - Total: 520 km^{2} (200 sq mi)

Population (2020 census)
  - Total: 695,697
  - Density: 1,300/km^{2} (3,500/sq mi)
- Time zone: UTC+8 (China Standard)
- Website: echeng.gov.cn (in Chinese)

Echeng District (simplified Chinese: 鄂城区; traditional Chinese: 鄂城區; pinyin: Èchéng Qū) is one of the three administrative districts into which the prefecture-level city of Ezhou, China's Hubei province, is divided. The district is quite small, and includes Ezhou's main urban area (i.e., in informal terms, Ezhou "city proper") and its eastern and southern suburbs.

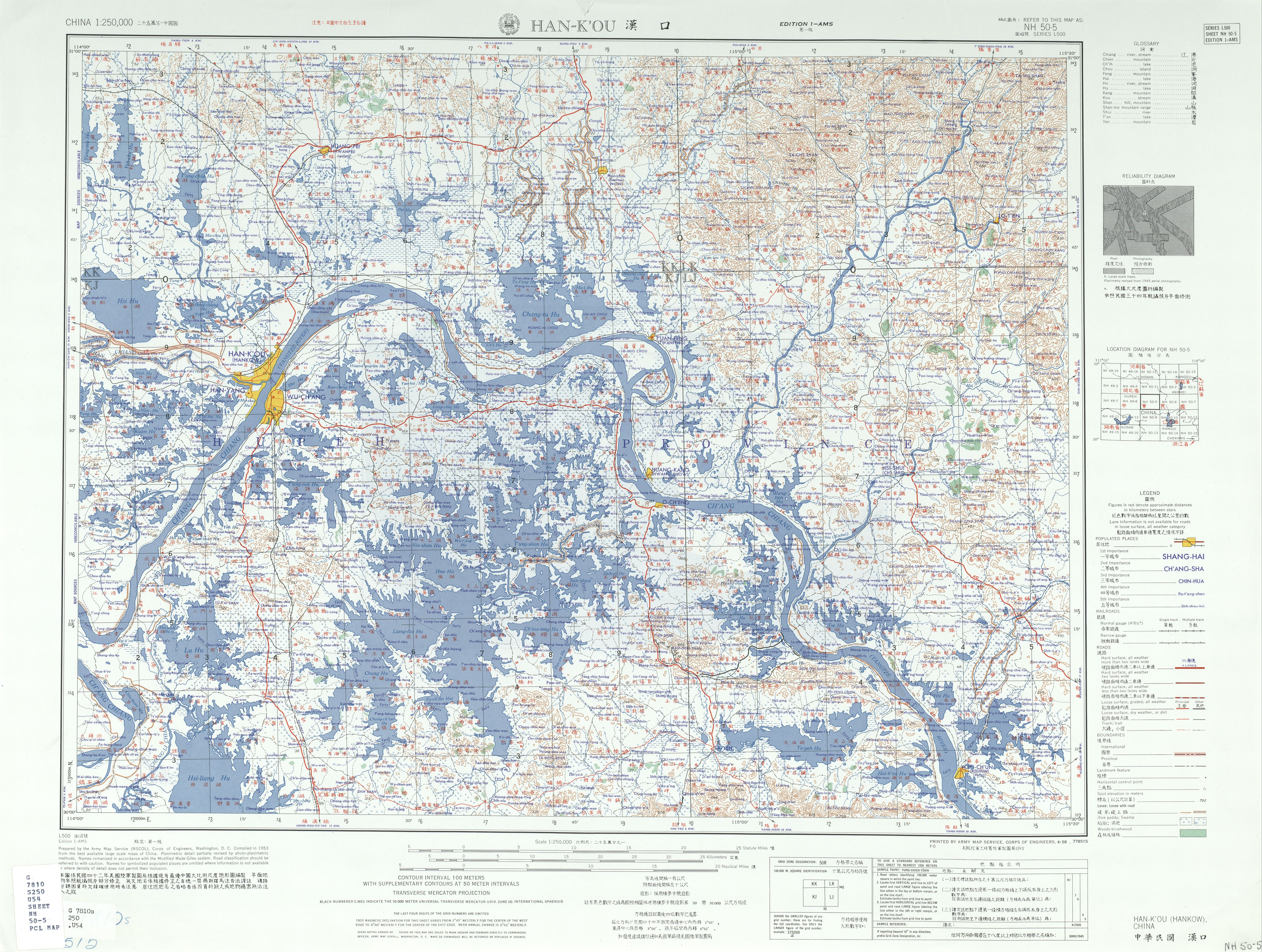
Map including Echeng (labeled as O-CH'ENG 鄂城) (1953)

== Administrative divisions ==
Echeng District administers several township-level divisions:

- Fenghuang Subdistrict (凤凰街道)
- Gulou Subdistrict (古楼街道)
- Xishan Subdistrict (西山街道)
- Fankou Subdistrict (樊口街道) (recognized by Echeng government)
- Changgang Town (长港镇)
- Dushan Town (杜山镇)
- Zelin Town (泽林镇)
- Bishidu Town (碧石渡镇)
- Tingzu Town (汀祖镇)
- Huahu Town (花湖镇)
- Huahu Economic Development Zone (花湖经济开发区) (recognized by Echeng Government)
- Ezhou Economic Development Zone (鄂州经济开发区) (recognized by National Bureau of Statistics)
- Airport Economic Development Zone (临空经济开发区) (recognized by National Bureau of Statistics)
  - Yangye Town (杨叶镇) (recognized by National Bureau of Statistics)
  - Yanji Town (燕矶镇) (recognized by National Bureau of Statistics)
  - Xinmiao Town (新庙镇) (recognized by National Bureau of Statistics)
  - Shawo Township (沙窝乡) (recognized by National Bureau of Statistics)

== Transport ==
=== Airport ===
- Ezhou Huahu Airport (opened on 17 July 2022)

=== Railway ===
- Ezhou railway station
- Ezhou East railway station
- Huahu railway station
