= Liangzihu, Ezhou =

Liangzihu 梁子湖区
- District
- Location in Hubei
- Coordinates (Liangzihu government): 30°06′00″N 114°41′05″E
- Country: People's Republic of China
- Province: Hubei
- Prefecture-level city: Ezhou

Area
  - Total: 482.5 km^{2} (186.3 sq mi)

Population (2020)
  - Total: 126,822
  - Density: 262.8/km^{2} (680.8/sq mi)
- Time zone: UTC+8 (China Standard)
- Website: 梁子湖区政府门户网站 (Liangzihu District Government Web Portal) (in Simplified Chinese)

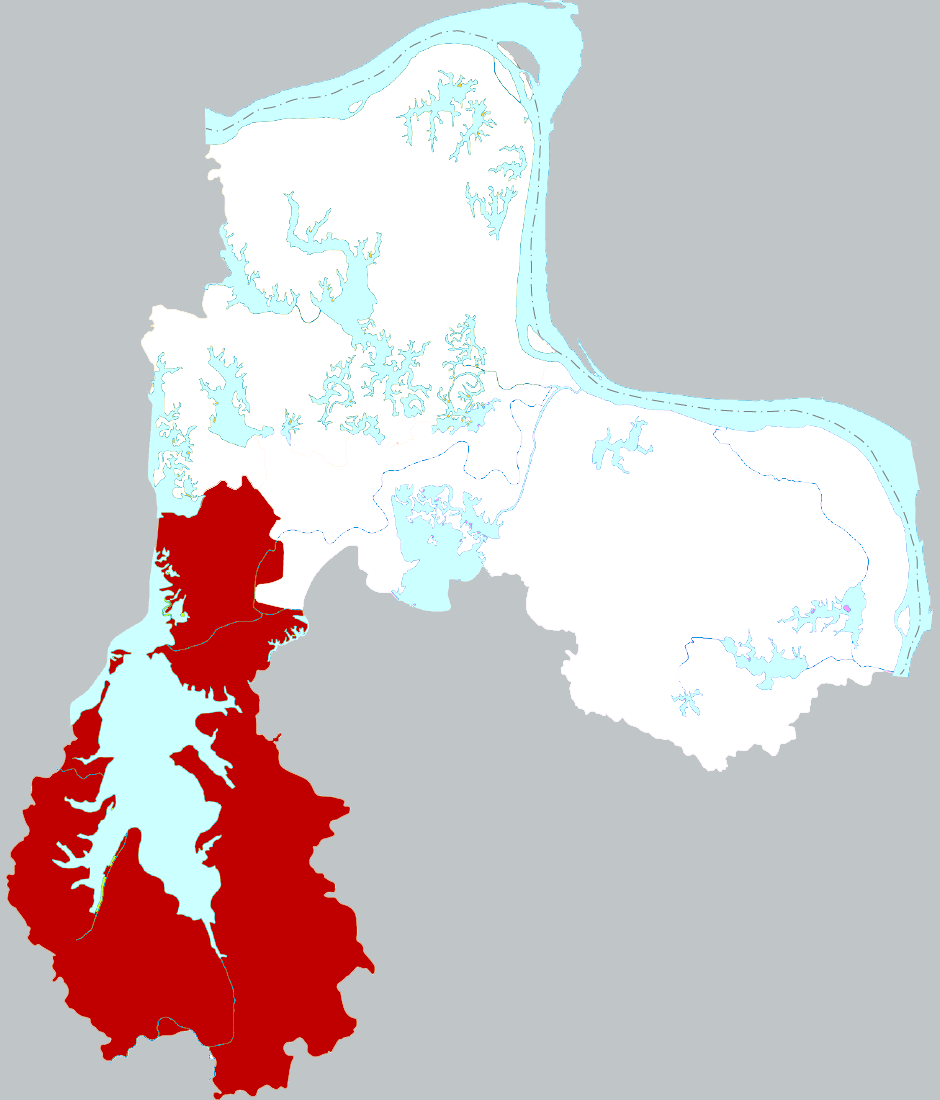
Location of Liangzihu district within Ezhou City

Liangzihu District (simplified Chinese: 梁子湖区; traditional Chinese: 梁子湖區; pinyin: Liángzihú Qū; lit. 'Liangzi Lake District') is a district of the city of Ezhou, Hubei, People's Republic of China.

The district is named after the Liangzi Lake (Liangzihu), eastern part of which is located within the district. On January 1, 2018, Ezhou officially implemented a new law called "Liangzihu District Marine Life Protection Zone Absolute Fishing Ban Work Implementation Plan" (Chinese: 梁子湖区水生生物保护区全面禁捕工作实施方案).

== Geography ==
=== Administrative Divisions ===
Liangzihu District has five towns:

#	Name	Chinese (S)
Towns
1	Taihe Supreme Harmony	太和镇
2	Donggou East Valley	东沟镇
3	Zhaoshan Marsh Mountain	沼山镇
4	Liangzi Ridge	梁子镇
5	Tujianao (T'u-chia-nao-shih) Tu Family Flattop	涂家垴镇
