= Shawo Township, Hubei =

Shawo Township 沙窝乡
- Township
- Location in Hubei
- Coordinates: 30°20′54″N 114°58′25″E
- Country: People's Republic of China
- Province: Hubei
- Prefecture-level city: Ezhou
- District: Echeng
- Elevation: 48 m (157 ft)

Population (2010)
  - Total: 26,842
- Time zone: UTC+8 (China Standard)

Shawo Township (simplified Chinese: 沙窝乡; traditional Chinese: 沙窩鄉; pinyin: Shāwō Xiāng) is a township of Echeng District, Ezhou, Hubei, People's Republic of China, located 5 kilometres (3.1 mi) south of the Yangtze River and almost twice that southeast of downtown Ezhou.

== Geography ==
=== Administrative divisions ===
As of 2011, it has 11 villages under its administration. As of 2016, Shawo Township administered:

#	Name (Mand.)	Chinese (Simp.)
Villages
1	Baotuan	保团村
2	Caobei	草陂村
3	Huqiao	胡桥村
4	Huangshan	黄山村
5	Jiajiang	加奖村
6	Pailou	牌楼村
7	Shawo	沙窝村
8	Xinwan	新湾村
9	Yuba	渔坝村
10	Zhaozhai	赵寨村
11	Zouma	走马村

== Demographics ==
Historical population
Year	Pop.	±% p.a.
2000	28,707	—
2010	26,842	−0.67%

== See also ==
- List of township-level divisions of Hubei
