= Ezhou railway station =

Railway station in China

Ezhou 鄂州
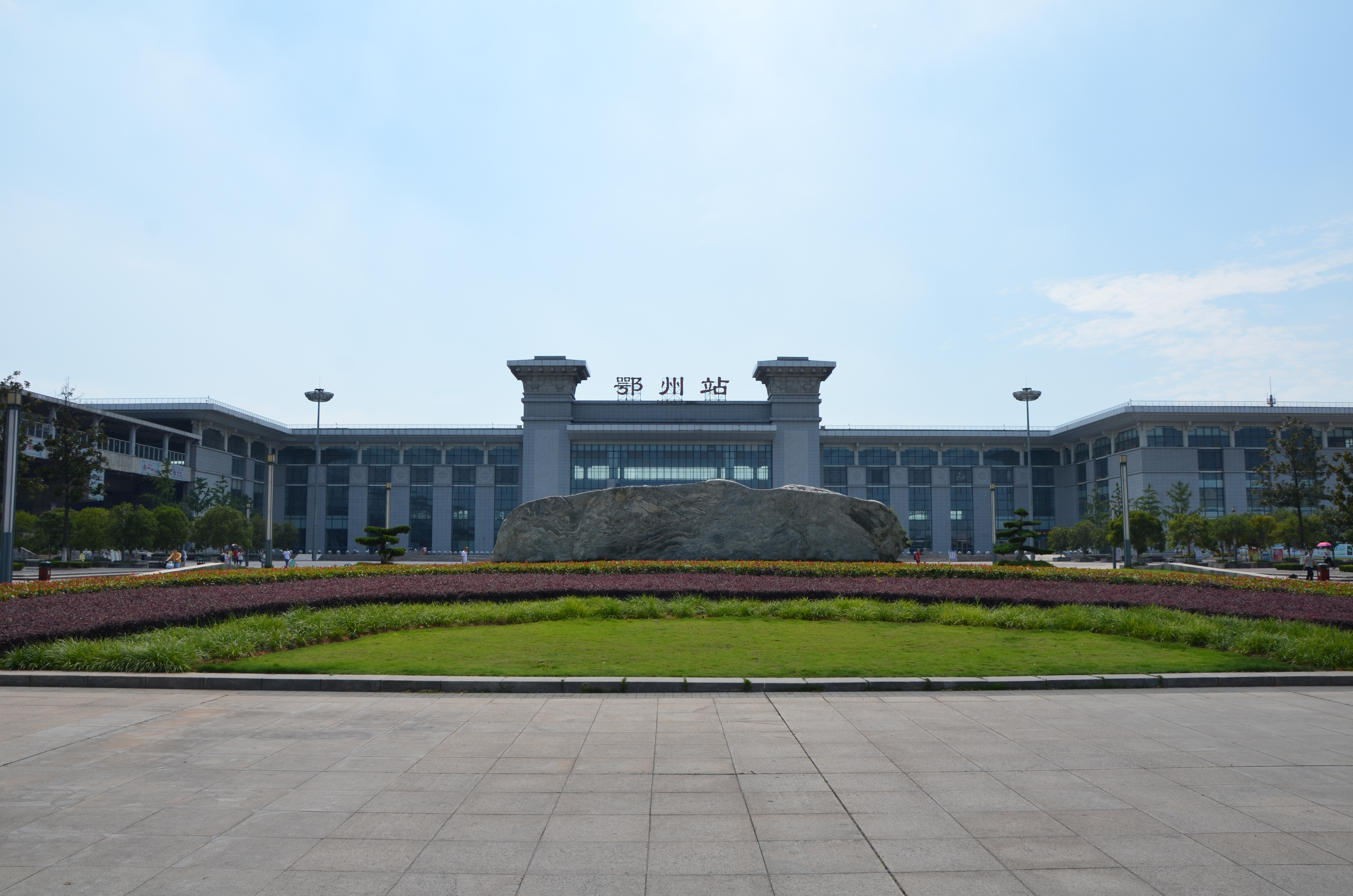

General information
- Location: Echeng District, Ezhou, Hubei; China
- Coordinates: 30.3643°N 114.8613°E
- Line(s): Wuhan–Jiujiang railway Wuhan–Jiujiang passenger railway

Ezhou railway station (Chinese: 鄂州站) is a railway station in Echeng District, Ezhou, Hubei, China.

== History ==
The lower, north-south platforms serve the Wuhan–Jiujiang railway. Reconstruction of the station began in 2010. The faster Wuhan–Jiujiang passenger railway opened on 18 June 2014 and passes east-west, creating a cross shape. Ezhou railway station sees passenger services on both lines.

Preceding station	China Railway High-speed	Following station
Huarong South towards Wuhan	Wuhan–Jiujiang high-speed railway	Ezhou East towards Jiujiang or Lushan
