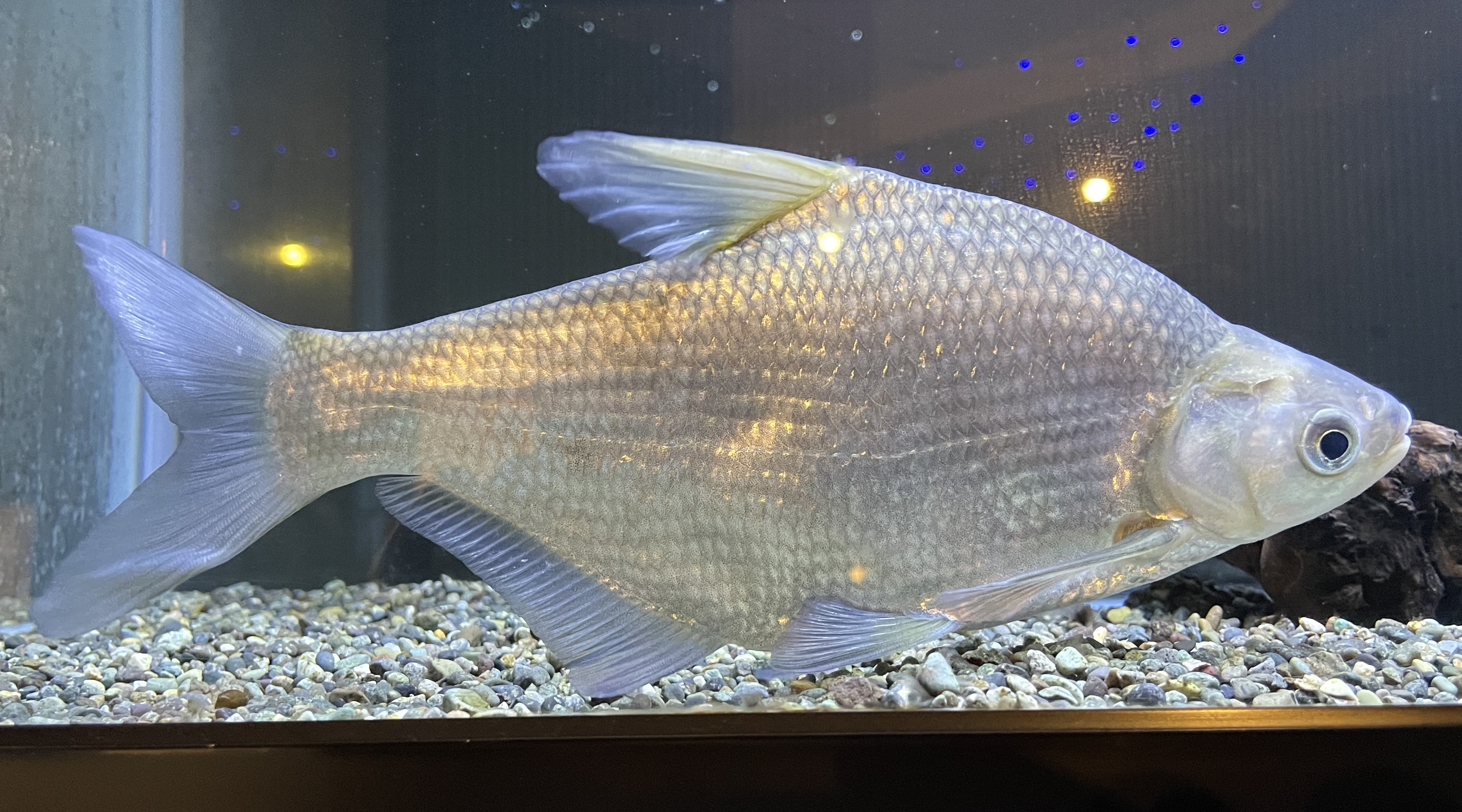

Conservation status
- Least Concern (IUCN 3.1)

Scientific classification
- Kingdom: Animalia
- Phylum: Chordata
- Class: Actinopterygii
- Order: Cypriniformes
- Suborder: Cyprinoidei
- Family: Xenocyprididae
- Genus: Megalobrama
- Species: M. amblycephala

Binomial name
- Megalobrama amblycephala P. L. Yih, 1955

= Wuchang bream =

Species of fish

Global aquaculture production of Wuchang bream (Megalobrama amblycephala) in thousand tonnes from 1950 to 2022, as reported by the FAO

The Wuchang bream (Megalobrama amblycephala; Chinese: 武昌魚; pinyin: Wǔchāng yú) is a species of freshwater ray-finned fish belonging to the family Xenocyprididae, the East Asian minnows or sharpbellies. This species is found in bodies of water throughout the Yangtze basin, China, including Liangzi Lake. It is an important object of fish farming, and in 2012 its total production ranked 12th on the world list of most important fish species in aquaculture, with a total weight of 0.71 million tons and value of 1.16 billion US dollars.
