= Ezhou =

Ezhou 鄂州市 O-chou
- Prefecture-level city
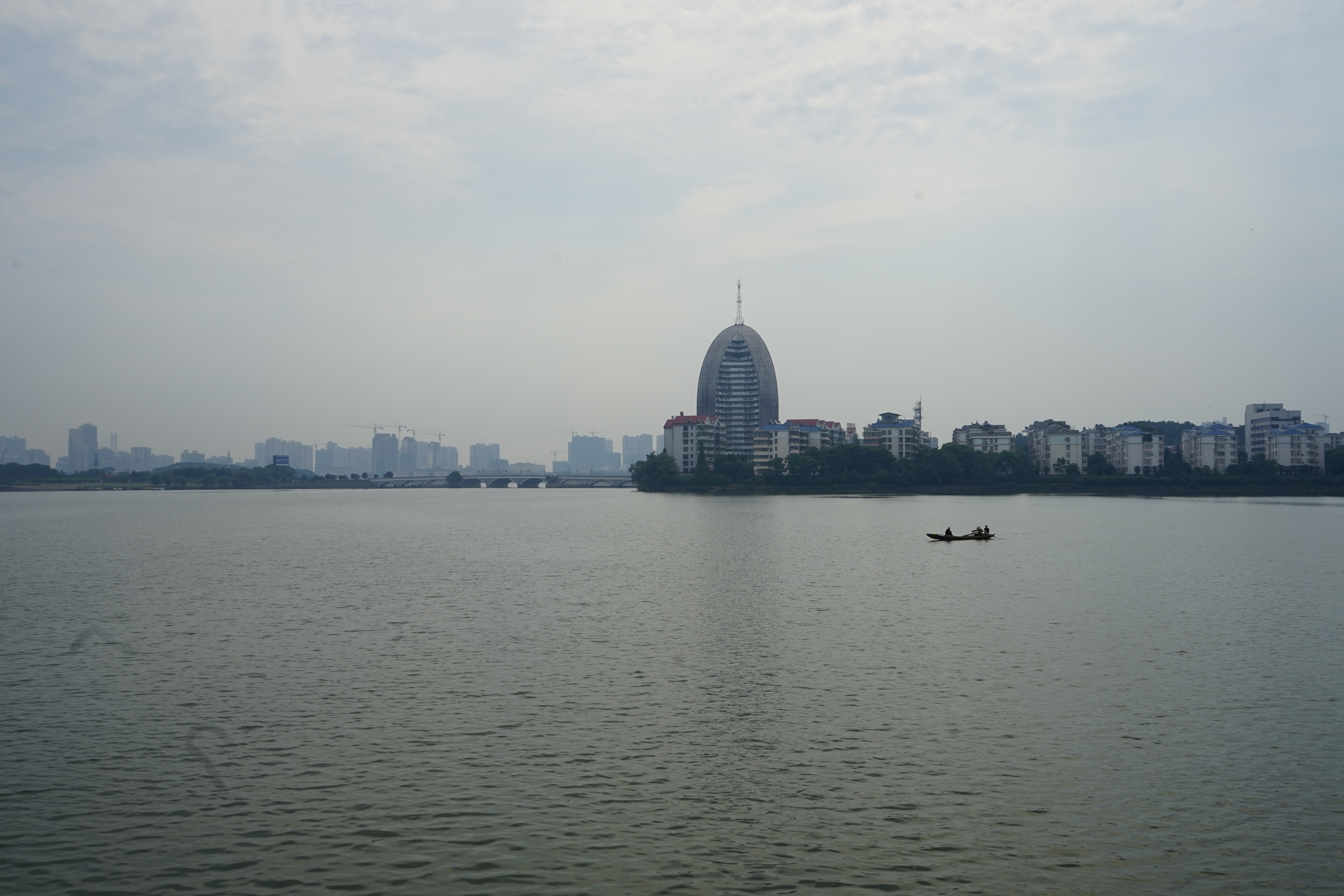
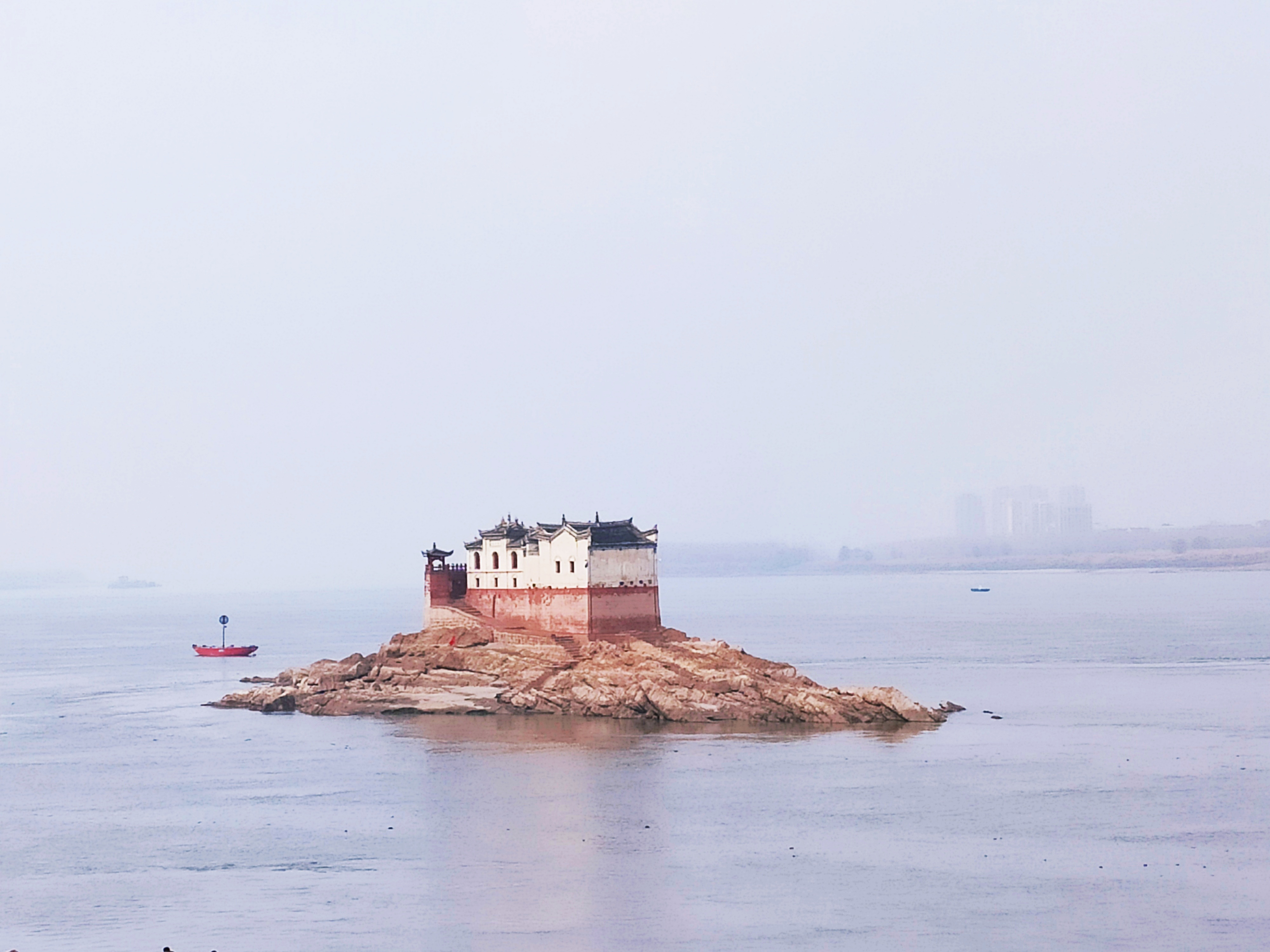
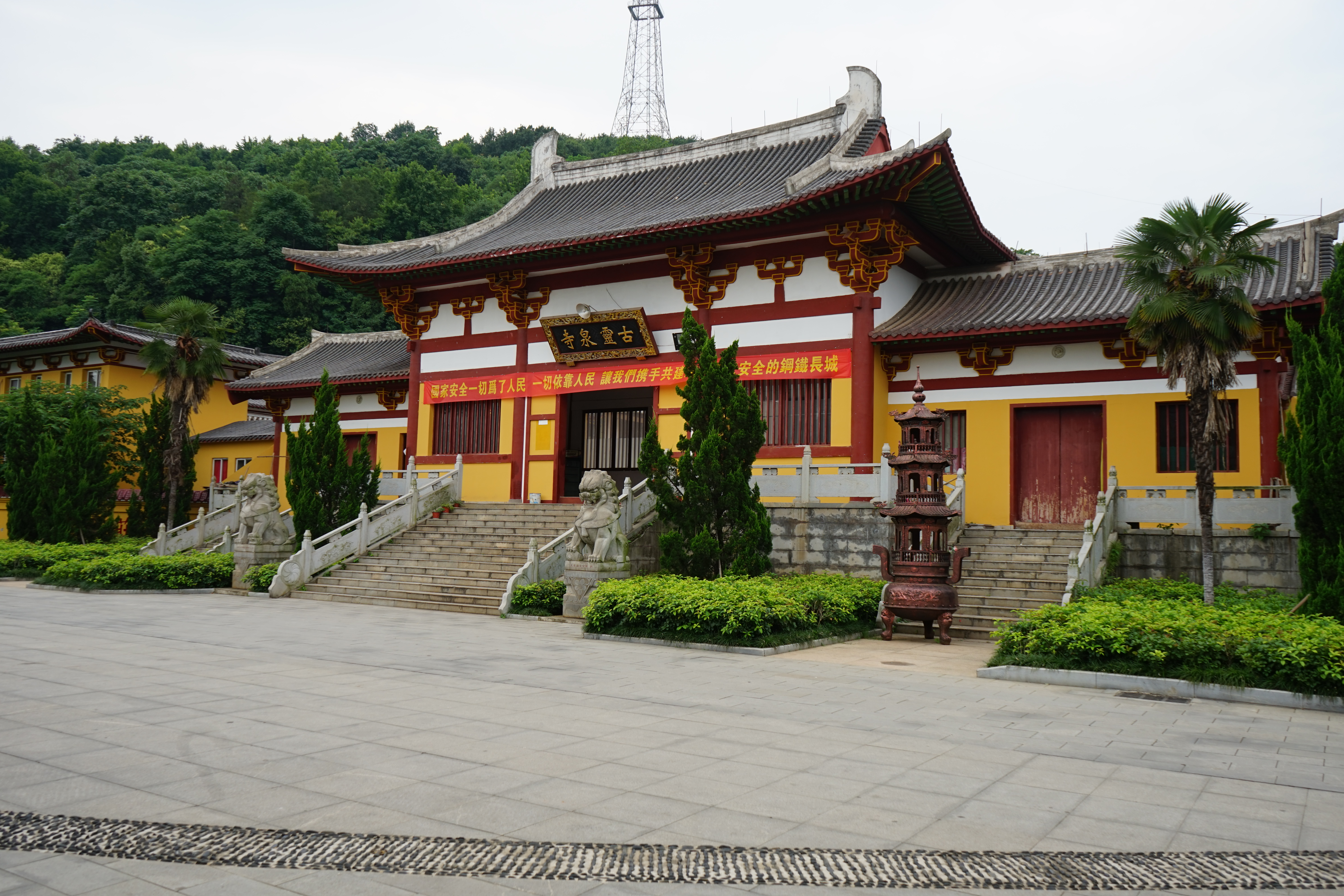
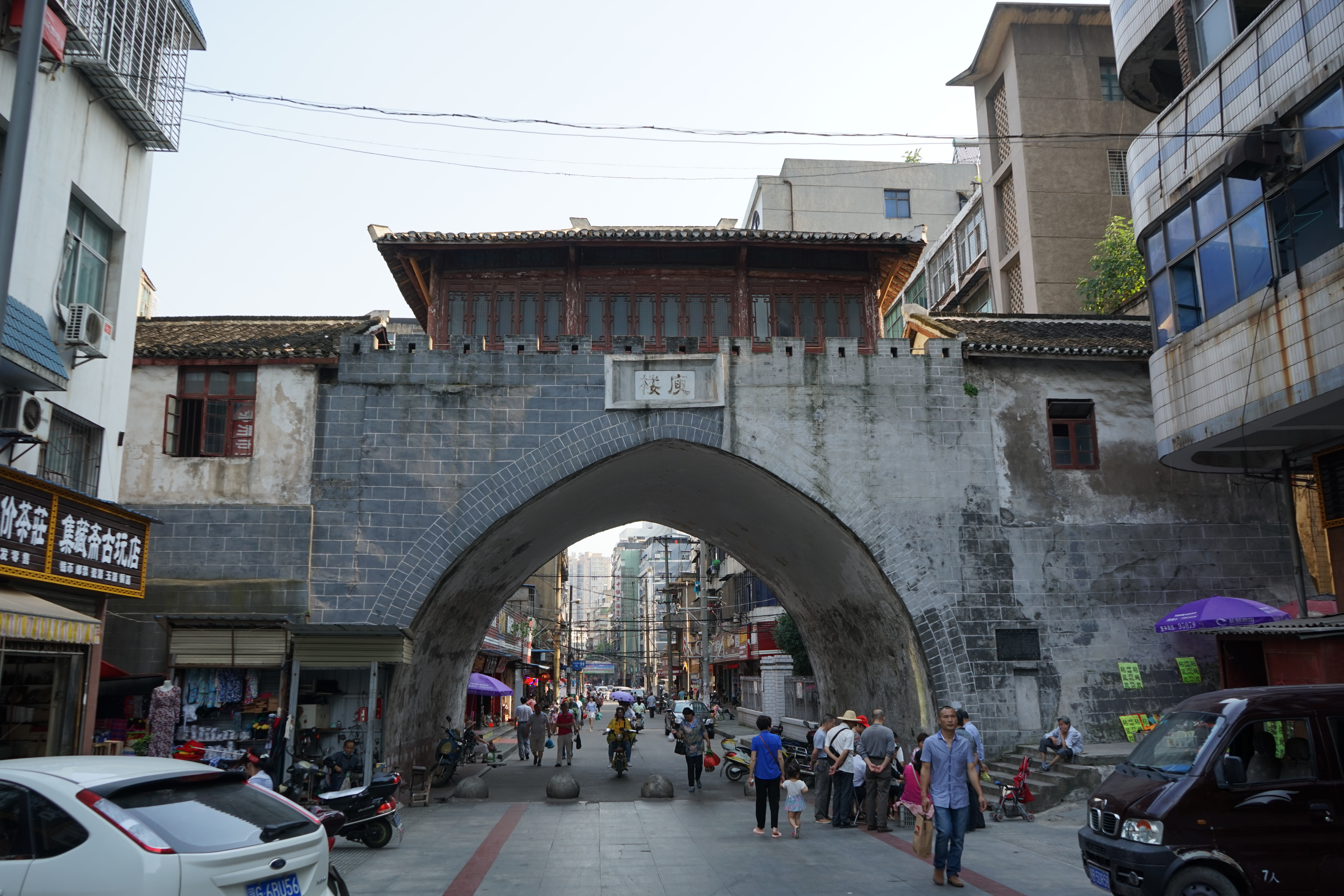
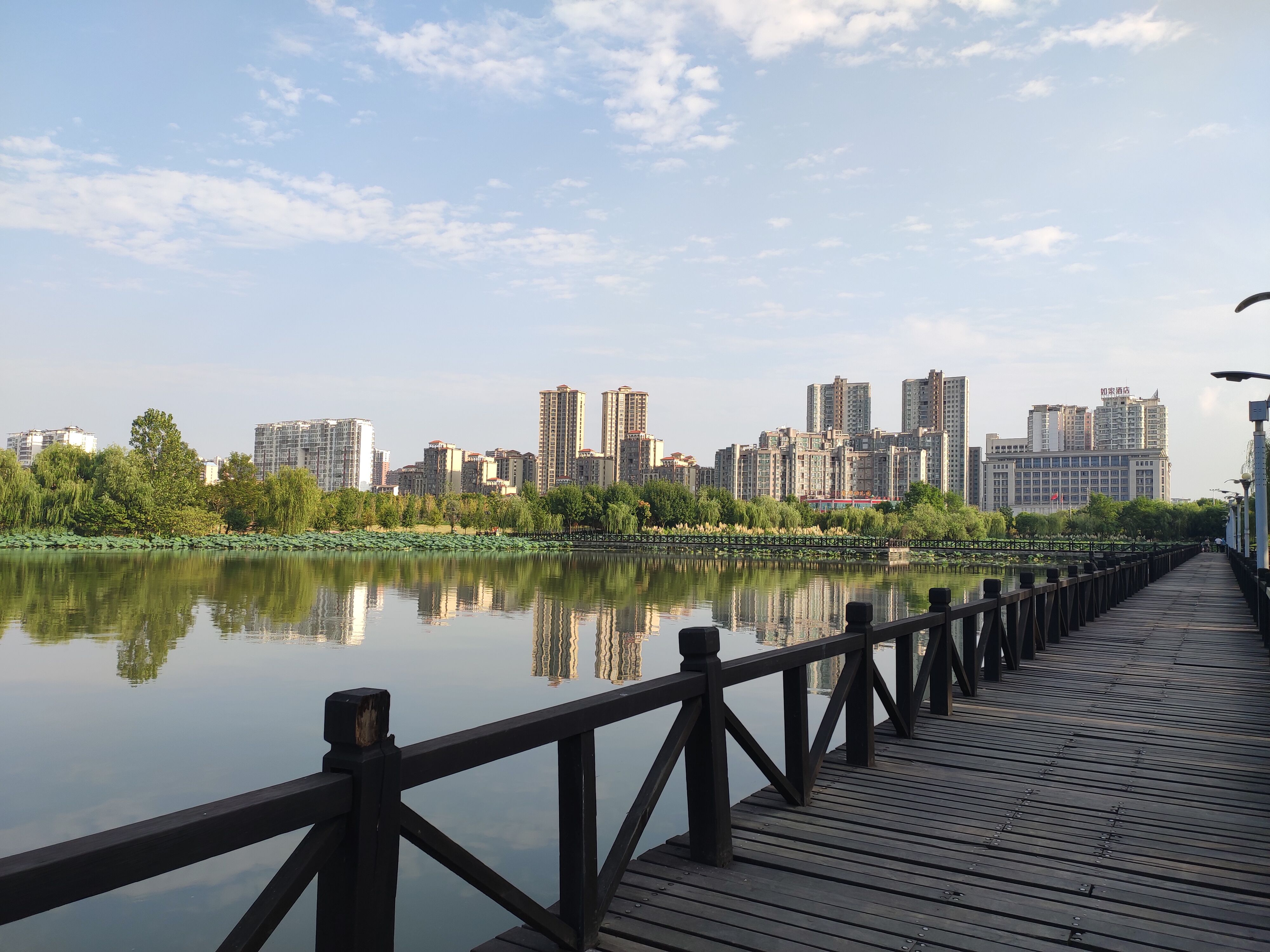
- Left to right, top to bottom: Central Yanglan Lake, Guanyin Pavilion, Lingquan Temple, Yu Liang Gate (looking south), the city viewed from Yanglan Lake

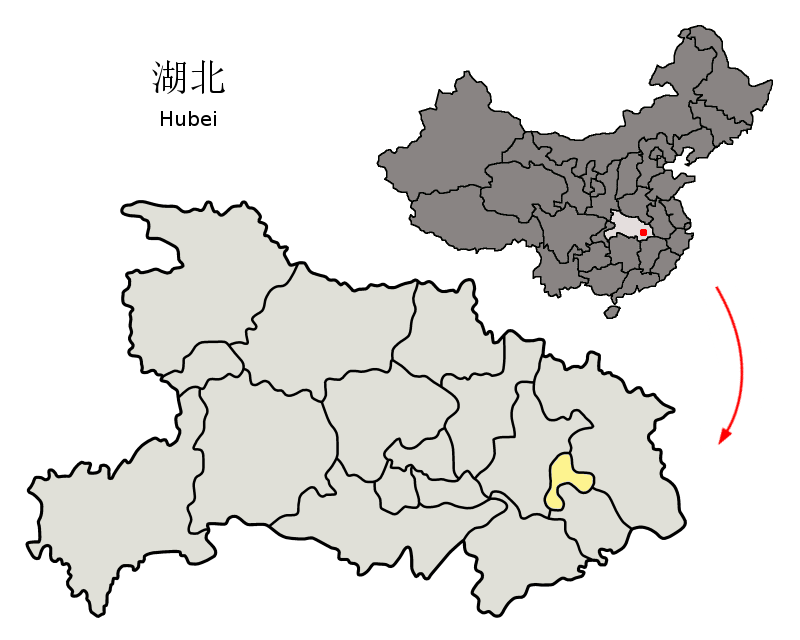
- Location in Hubei and the PRC

- Location in Hubei
- Coordinates (Ezhou municipal government): 30°23′29″N 114°53′42″E
- Country: People's Republic of China
- Province: Hubei
- Municipal seat: Echeng District

Area
  - Prefecture-level city: 1,593.54 km^{2} (615.27 sq mi)
  - Urban: 1,593.54 km^{2} (615.27 sq mi)
  - Metro: 963.4 km^{2} (372.0 sq mi)

Population (2020 census)
  - Prefecture-level city: 1,079,353
  - Density: 677.330/km^{2} (1,754.28/sq mi)
  - Urban: 1,079,353
  - Urban density: 677.330/km^{2} (1,754.28/sq mi)
  - Metro: 1,152,559
  - Metro density: 1,196/km^{2} (3,099/sq mi)

GDP
  - Prefecture-level city: CN¥ 73.0 billion US$ 11.7 billion
  - Per capita: CN¥ 68,924; US$ 11,066
- Time zone: UTC+8 (China Standard)
- ISO 3166 code: CN-HB-07
- Licence plate prefixes: 鄂G
- Website: 鄂州市政府门户网站 (in Simplified Chinese)

Ezhou
- Chinese: 鄂州
Transcriptions
Standard Mandarin
- Hanyu Pinyin: Èzhōu
- Wade–Giles: O^{4}-chou^{1}
- IPA: [ɤ̂.ʈʂóʊ]
Yue: Cantonese
- Jyutping: Ngok6-zau1
- IPA: [ŋɔk̚˨ tsɐw˥]

Ezhou (Chinese: 鄂州), also known by another name O-chou is a prefecture-level city in eastern Hubei Province, China. As of the 2020 census, the city had a population of 1,079,353, of which 695,697 lived in the core Echeng District. The Ezhou - Huanggang built-up (or metro) area was home to 1,152,559 inhabitants made of the Echeng and Huangzhou, Huanggang Districts.

== Geography ==
Ezhou lies on the southern bank of the Yangtze River east of the southern section of Wuchang, across the river from the city of Huanggang, to which it is connected by the Ehuang Bridge. Lying between the cities of Wuhan and Huangshi, Ezhou has a relatively small area of 1,504 square kilometers (581 sq mi).

There are many lakes in Ezhou, including the Liangzi Lake in Liangzihu District and Yanglan Lake, along with more than 133 lakes and pools. The city is the origin of Wuchang Bream and as a result is nicknamed "city of one hundred lakes" and "the land of fish and rice".

=== Climate ===
Climate data for Ezhou, elevation 35 m (115 ft), (1991–2020 normals, extremes 1981–present)
Month	Jan	Feb	Mar	Apr	May	Jun	Jul	Aug	Sep	Oct	Nov	Dec	Year
Record high °C (°F)	22.6 (72.7)	29.7 (85.5)	34.7 (94.5)	34.5 (94.1)	36.2 (97.2)	37.8 (100.0)	40.6 (105.1)	39.9 (103.8)	38.5 (101.3)	35.6 (96.1)	29.4 (84.9)	23.5 (74.3)	40.6 (105.1)
Mean daily maximum °C (°F)	8.3 (46.9)	11.5 (52.7)	16.2 (61.2)	22.6 (72.7)	27.4 (81.3)	30.3 (86.5)	33.4 (92.1)	33.2 (91.8)	29.2 (84.6)	23.6 (74.5)	17.3 (63.1)	11.0 (51.8)	22.0 (71.6)
Daily mean °C (°F)	4.9 (40.8)	7.6 (45.7)	11.9 (53.4)	18.0 (64.4)	22.9 (73.2)	26.2 (79.2)	29.3 (84.7)	28.9 (84.0)	24.8 (76.6)	19.1 (66.4)	12.9 (55.2)	7.0 (44.6)	17.8 (64.0)
Mean daily minimum °C (°F)	2.2 (36.0)	4.6 (40.3)	8.6 (47.5)	14.3 (57.7)	19.2 (66.6)	23.0 (73.4)	26.0 (78.8)	25.5 (77.9)	21.4 (70.5)	15.7 (60.3)	9.6 (49.3)	4.1 (39.4)	14.5 (58.1)
Record low °C (°F)	−6.0 (21.2)	−5.1 (22.8)	−1.5 (29.3)	3.7 (38.7)	9.1 (48.4)	13.8 (56.8)	19.3 (66.7)	17.5 (63.5)	12.4 (54.3)	5.0 (41.0)	−2.5 (27.5)	−6.7 (19.9)	−6.7 (19.9)
Average precipitation mm (inches)	61.7 (2.43)	76.8 (3.02)	103.1 (4.06)	150.4 (5.92)	166.8 (6.57)	223.6 (8.80)	234.4 (9.23)	120.6 (4.75)	73.2 (2.88)	66.7 (2.63)	57.7 (2.27)	36.9 (1.45)	1,371.9 (54.01)
Average precipitation days (≥ 0.1 mm)	10.8	11.4	14.0	12.9	12.4	13.0	12.4	10.5	7.5	8.7	9.0	7.8	130.4
Average snowy days	3.5	1.9	0.7	0	0	0	0	0	0	0	0.3	1.0	7.4
Average relative humidity (%)	76	75	75	74	74	79	77	76	74	74	75	73	75
Mean monthly sunshine hours	104.9	106.2	130.4	164.7	184.3	175.7	230.9	234.0	187.7	163.3	144.2	133.0	1,959.3
Percentage possible sunshine	32	34	35	42	43	42	54	58	51	47	46	42	44
Source: China Meteorological Administration

== History ==
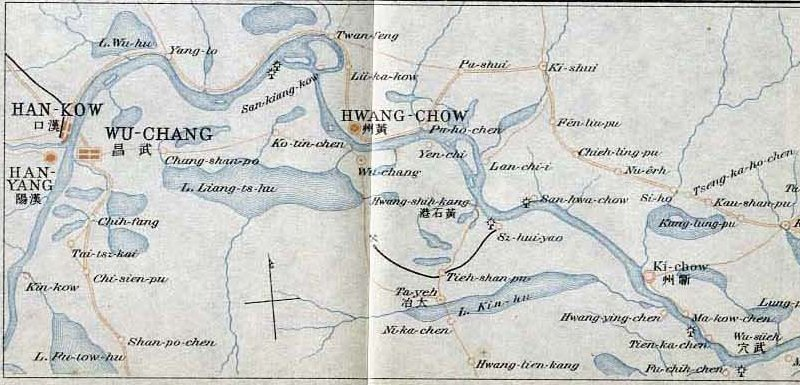
A 1915 map showing a small section of Wuchang (today's Ezhou), across the river from Hwang-Chow (Huangzhou), the modern central urban area of Huanggang, along with a much larger area further west (adjacent to Hanyang and Hankou)

The name "Ezhou" dates to the Han dynasty (206 BCE – 220 CE) and derives from the nearby ancient Zhou dynasty (1046–256 BCE) vassal State of E. Although the administrative seat of the city changed several times, the name remained unchanged until the Three Kingdoms era (220−280) at which time it became the capital of the state of Eastern Wu ruled by Sun Quan and was renamed "Wuchang". This name remained in use as late as 1915, which proved confusing to travelers, as it was also applied to the much larger city of Wuchang, itself shortly to become part of Wuhan.

Throughout China's history, Ezhou has remained an important city politically, economically, and militarily with its strategic position along the middle part of the Yangtze River. It is also an important location in the history of the Pure Land Sect of Buddhism.

== Administration ==
Ezhou has three districts:

#	Name	Chinese (S)
Districts
1	Echeng District	鄂城区 (the central urban area)
2	Huarong District	华容区
3	Liangzihu District (Liangzi Lake District)	梁子湖区

Map
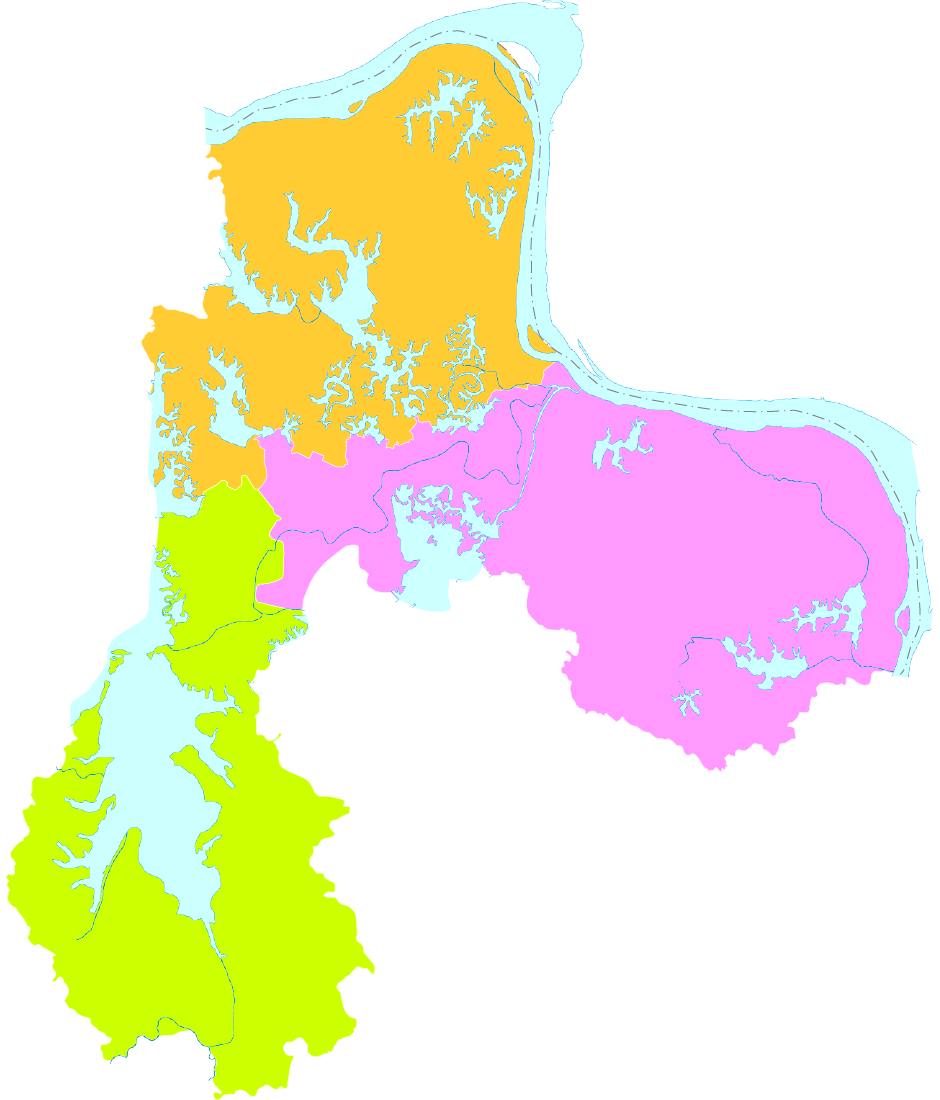

== Economy ==
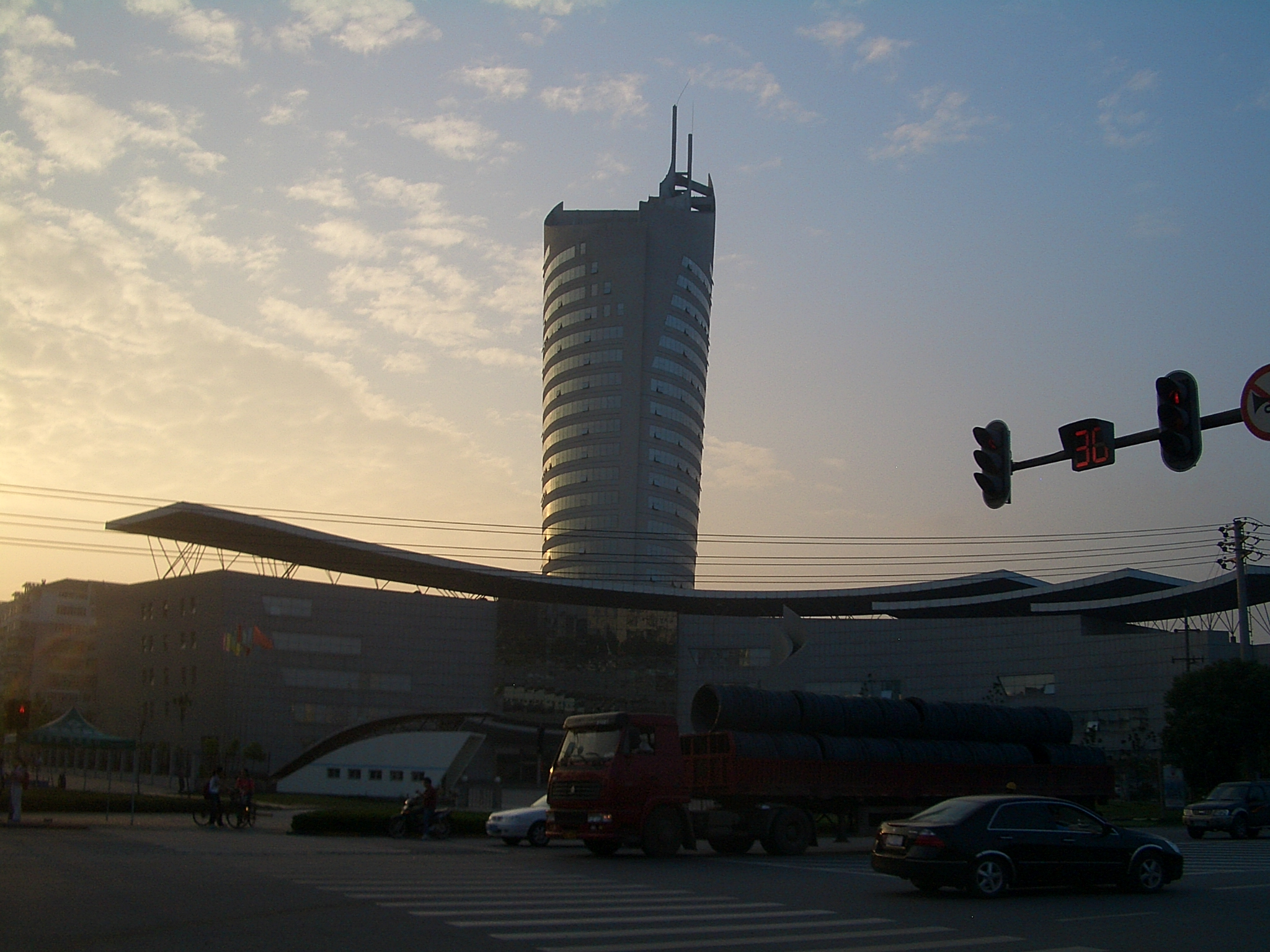
Ezhou television company tower

Ezhou has six ports on the Yangtze including one than can handle up to 10,000-tonne (9,800-long-ton; 11,000-short-ton) vessels. Many important rail lines and national highways cross the area. This infrastructure make it a major logistics and distribution center. Important industries include metallurgy, construction materials, textiles, chemicals, and machinery.

This city is also known to host the world's largest pig farm that is constructed in a 26-storey building where pigs get fed, then eventually slaughtered to distribute pork to restaurants all across the country and abroad.

== Transportation ==
Ezhou is served by the E-Huang Expressway, China National Highways 106 and 316, the Wuhan–Jiujiang Railway, the Wuhan–Huangshi intercity railway of the Wuhan Metropolitan Area Intercity Railway and Ezhou Huahu International Airport. Ezhou has two bridges over the Yangtze.

Ezhou railway station (30.363343°N 114.860499°E), located southwest of downtown, has an interesting layout, somewhat similar to that of the Secaucus Junction in New Jersey. Until 2014, there was just one rail line there: the north–south Wuhan–Jiujiang Railway, which is served by a large number of trains traveling from Wuhan to Nanchang and points further east and south (Fujian, Zhejiang, etc.). Until 2013, there were no commuter trains in per se in Hubei, but it took only about one hour (usually, with a stop at Huarong) to reach one of Wuhan's train stations (such as Wuchang railway station) train station from Ezhou using any of those trains. The distance from the Ezhou railway station to Wuchang by rail is 82 kilometers (51 mi). In 2014, the Wuhan-Huangshi intercity railway of the Wuhan Metropolitan Area Intercity Railway, the region's new commuter line system, was opened. This line, which runs east–west in the area, has crossed the Wuhan–Jiujiang Railway tracks at the right angle just south of the previously existing Ezhou station. To accommodate the new line, the Ezhou Station was expanded in 2013–2014, with platforms constructed on the new commuter line, providing a possibility for an easy transfer between the two lines. This is said to be the first station in China with this layout.

The trains on the commuter line travel to Wuhan Railway Station (56 km or 35 mi, 30–40 min from Ezhou).

The commuter line has one more station in Ezhou, farther to the east. It is Ezhou East, 64 km (40 mi) from Wuhan Railway Station.

== Tourism ==
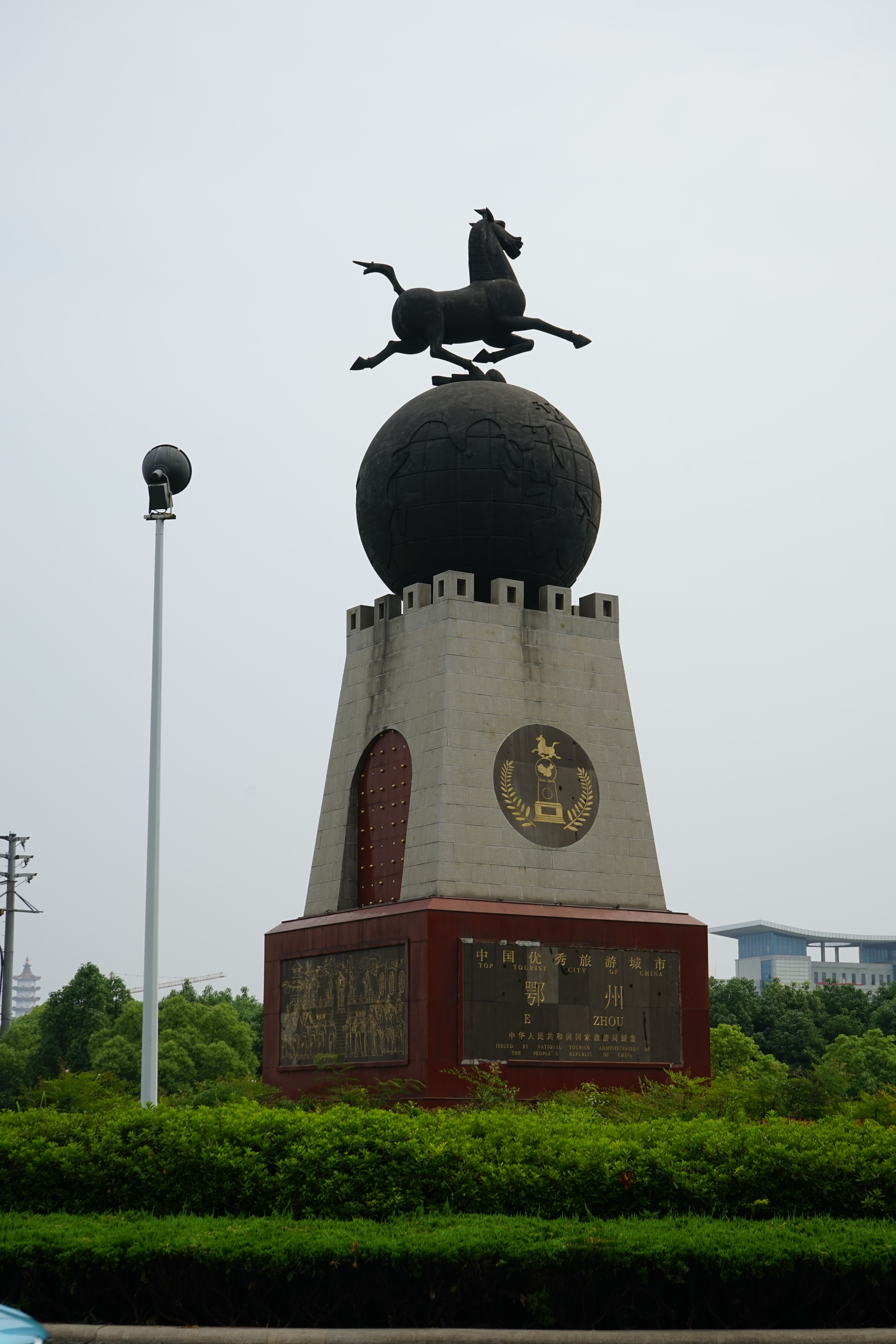
Top Tourist City of China Ezhou Statue

Ezhou has several tourism sites, including the West Hill (which is in the center of the city), and the nearby Lotus Hill. There are also three lakes, Liangzi Lake, Yanglan Lake (洋澜湖) and Honglian Lake.
