= Wuhan–Xi'an high-speed railway =

High-speed railway line in Hubei, China

Overview
- Status: Operational
- Owner: China Railway
- Locale: Hubei, Shaanxi provinces, China
- Termini: Hankou; Xi'an East

Service
- Type: Passenger dedicated railway
- Operator: China Railway Wuhan Group

History
- Opened: 29 November 2019 (Shiyan-Xi'an); 30 June 2026 (Xi'an-Shiyan)

Technical
- Line length: 457 km (284 mi)
- Track gauge: 1,435 mm (4 ft 8 1/2 in)
- Electrification: 50 Hz 25 kV（AC）
- Operating speed: 350 km/h (217 mph)

The Wuhan–Xi'an high-speed railway is a high-speed passenger-dedicated line (PDL) in Hubei and Shaanxi, China, connecting the city of Wuhan and Xi'an. It opened on 29 November 2019 between Wuhan and Shiyan in northwestern Hubei. The Shiyan-Xi'an section was opened to traffic on 30 June 2026.

The 457 kilometres (284 mi) long railway has a design speed of 350 km/h (217 mph). The line starts from Hankou Station, a railhub with connections on:

- Hefei–Wuhan passenger railway,
- Shijiazhuang–Wuhan high-speed railway,
- Wuhan–Yichang railway,
- Beijing–Guangzhou railway,
- Xiexindian–Gepu railway,
- Macheng–Wuhan railway, and
- Hankou–Danjiangkou railway.

The line runs northwest from Wuhan via Xiaogan to Xiangyang (where it intersects another new high-speed line running from Zhengzhou southwest to Wanzhou) to Shiyan. The line from Hankou to Xiaogan incorporates an existing inter-city railway, the Wuhan–Xiaogan intercity railway, which continues to provide intercity services using mainly C-class trains.

The pre-existing Wuhan–Xiaogan intercity railway has stations at:

- Hankou
- Houhu
- Jinyintan
- Panlongcheng (planned but not yet constructed)
- Tianhe Airport
- Tianhejie
- Minji
- Maochen
- Huaiyin
- Xiaogan Dong (East)

The section of the line opened in 2019 runs from Xiaogan Dong (East) to Shiyan Dong (East) and has intermediate stations at:

- Yunmeng Dong (East),
- Anluxi,
- Suizhou Nan (South),
- Suixian,
- Zaoyang,
- Xiangyang Dong (East),
- Guchen Bei (North),
- Danjiangkou,
- Wudangshan Xi (West),

These stations are served by mainly G-class trains, some of which also call at Tianhe Airport.

In December 2019 there were 11 trains per day in each direction along the Wuhan–Shiyan line, the fastest time between the terminals is now 1 hour 57 minutes (for example trains G6817 and G6818) the slowest direct train on the line takes 2 hour and 57 minutes and stops at most stations (train G6816).

The Shiyan-Xi'an section has stations at Yunxi, Manchuanguan, Shanyang, Shangluo West, Lantian and Xi'an East.

== See also ==
- Shanghai–Wuhan–Chengdu passenger railway
- Hankou–Danjiangkou railway
