= Tianmen South railway station =

Railway station in Tianmen, China

Tianmennan 天门南
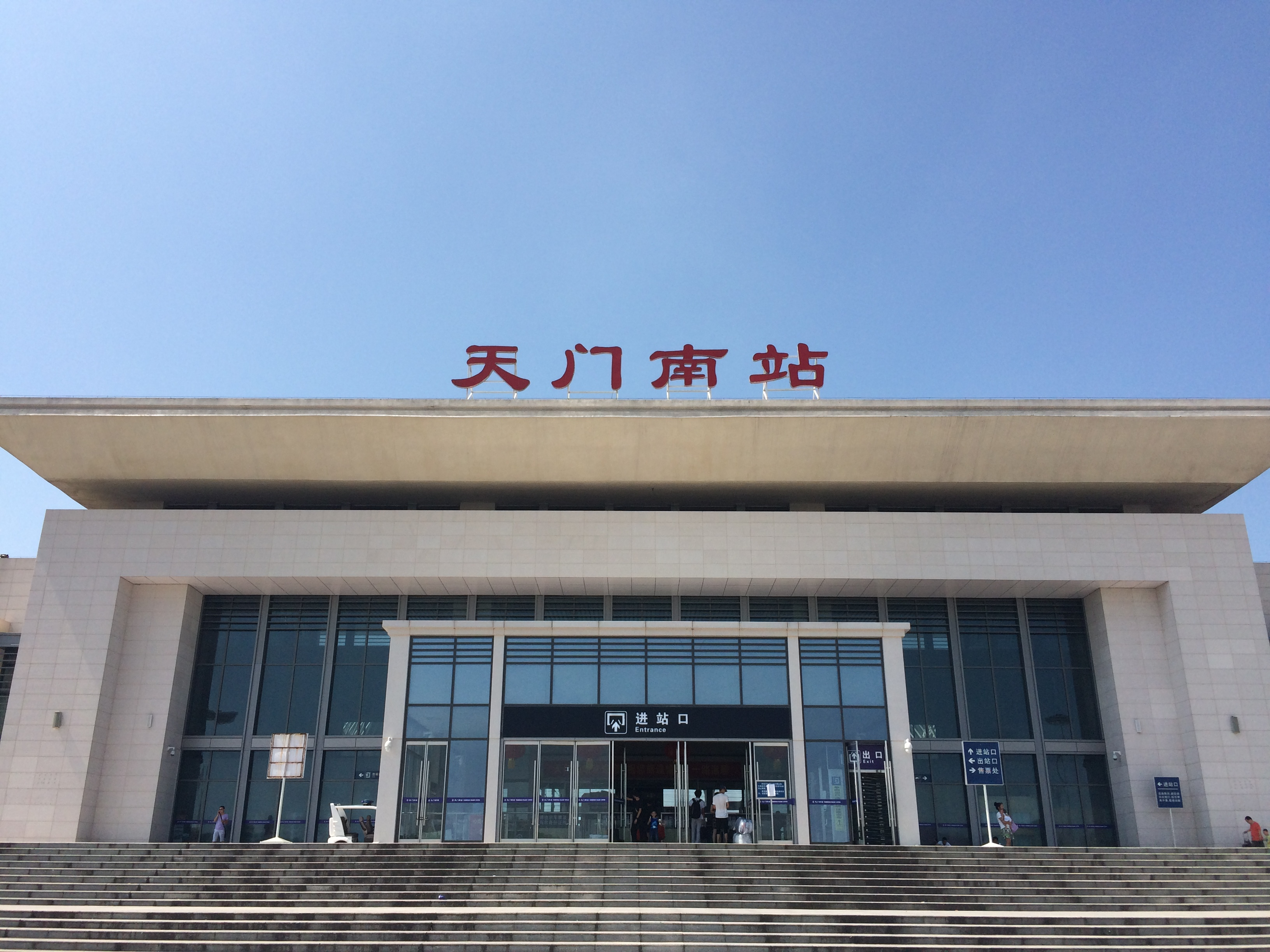

General information
- Location: Tianmen, Hubei; China
- Operated by: Wuhan Railway Bureau, China Railway Corporation
- Line: Wuhan–Yichang railway
Location

Tianmen South railway station is a railway station located in Tianmen City, Hubei Province, People's Republic of China, on the Hankou-Yichang Railway.

During the planning station, the station was called "Xiantao", because it is actually closer to Xiantao's main urban area than to Tianmen's.

Tianmen South is second-busiest (after Jingzhou) passenger station out of the six intermediate stations of the Hanyi Railway. As of late 2012, on an average day, 3,000 to 4,000 passengers use it, with the daily ridership rising to around 7,500 passenger during busiest period. It is anticipated that the station may handle up to 20,000 passengers per day during the next Chinese New Year peak period.

== History ==
Tianmen South railway station was opened for passenger service on July 1, 2012, along with the new Wuhan–Yichang railway. It is expected that by the end of 2012 freight operations will start at this station as well.

== Nearby stations ==
- Xiantao West railway station

Preceding station	China Railway High-speed	Following station
Hanchuan towards Hankou	Wuhan–Yichang railway	Xiantao West towards Yichang East
