= Hanchuan railway station =

Railway station in Hanchuan, China

Hanchuan 汉川
- Platform 1

General information
- Location: Hanchuan, Xiaogan, Hubei; China
- Operator: China Railway Wuhan Group, China Railway Corporation
- Line: Wuhan–Yichang railway

History
- Opened: 1 July 2012
Location

Hanchuan railway station is a railway station located in Hanchuan, Xiaogan, Hubei Province, People's Republic of China, on the Wuhan–Yichang railway, operated by China Railway Wuhan Group. It is located approximately 15 kilometres (9.3 mi) away from the city centre. It opened on 1 July 2012.

== Nearby stations ==
- Hankou railway station (Wuhan)
- Tianmen South railway station (Tianmen)

Preceding station	China Railway High-speed	Following station
Hankou Terminus	Wuhan–Yichang railway	Tianmen South towards Yichang East
Hankou Terminus	Wuhan–Xiantao intercity railway	Xiantao Terminus
