= Xiantao West railway station =

Railway station in Xiantao, China

Coordinates: 30.4277°N 113.1339°E

Xiantaoxi 仙桃西
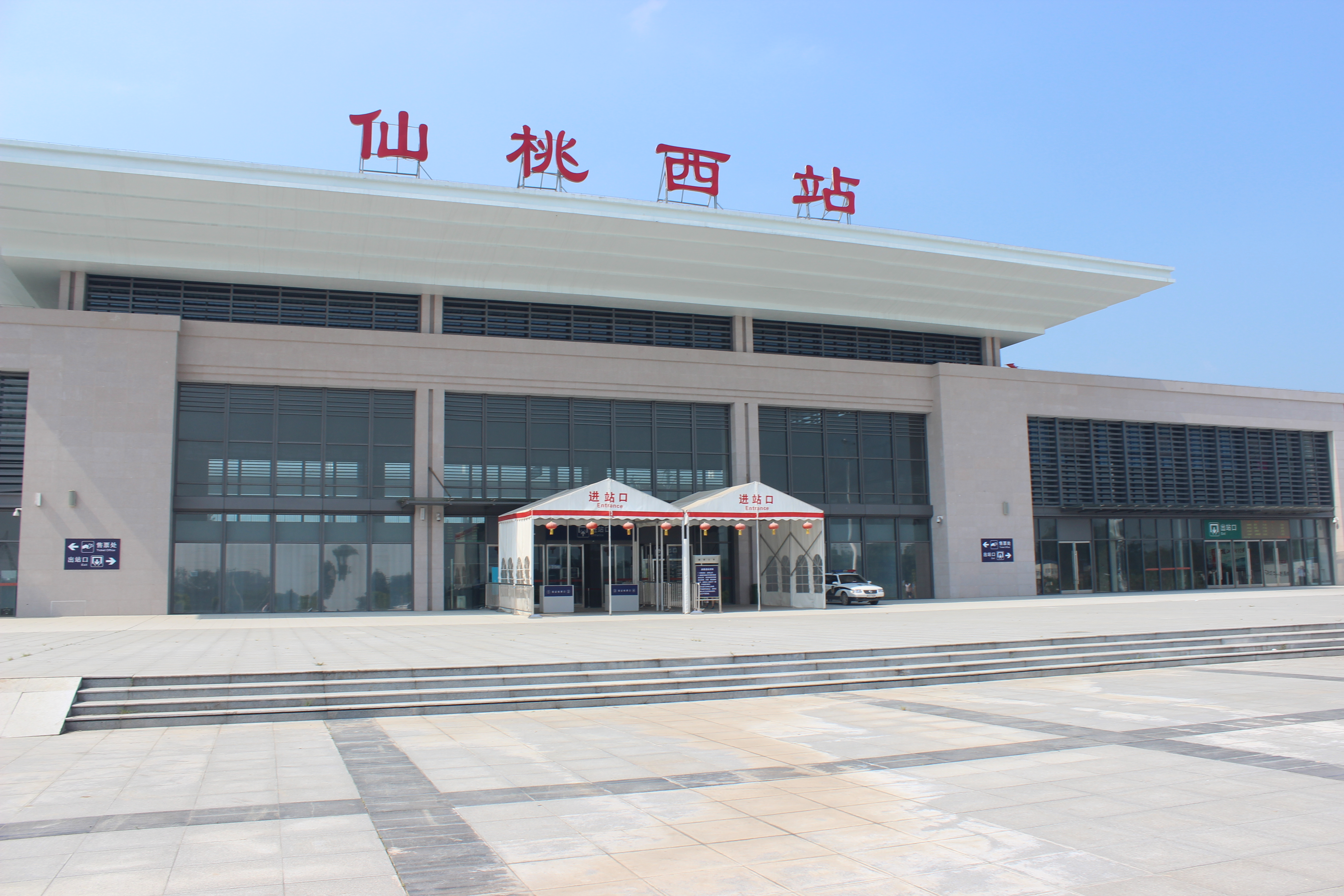

General information
- Location: Xiantao, Hubei; China
- Operated by: Wuhan Railway Bureau, China Railway Corporation
- Line(s): Wuhan–Yichang railway

Xiantao West railway station is a railway station located in Xiantao City, Hubei Province, People's Republic of China, on the Hanyi Railway which operated by Wuhan Railway Bureau, China Railway Corporation.

The station is located near Leichang Village (雷场村) of Sanfutan Town (三伏潭镇), at a fairly large distance from Xiantao's city center: around 30 km straight-line distance, or some 40 km by highway.

During construction, it was anticipated that once train service began, the station would serve around 1500 people per day.

== History ==
The station was opened on July 1, 2012, along with the new Wuhan–Yichang railway.

Preceding station	China Railway High-speed	Following station
Tianmen South towards Hankou	Wuhan–Yichang railway	Qianjiang towards Yichang East
