= Jingzhou railway station (Hubei) =

Railway station in Jingzhou, Hubei, China

Jingzhou 荆州
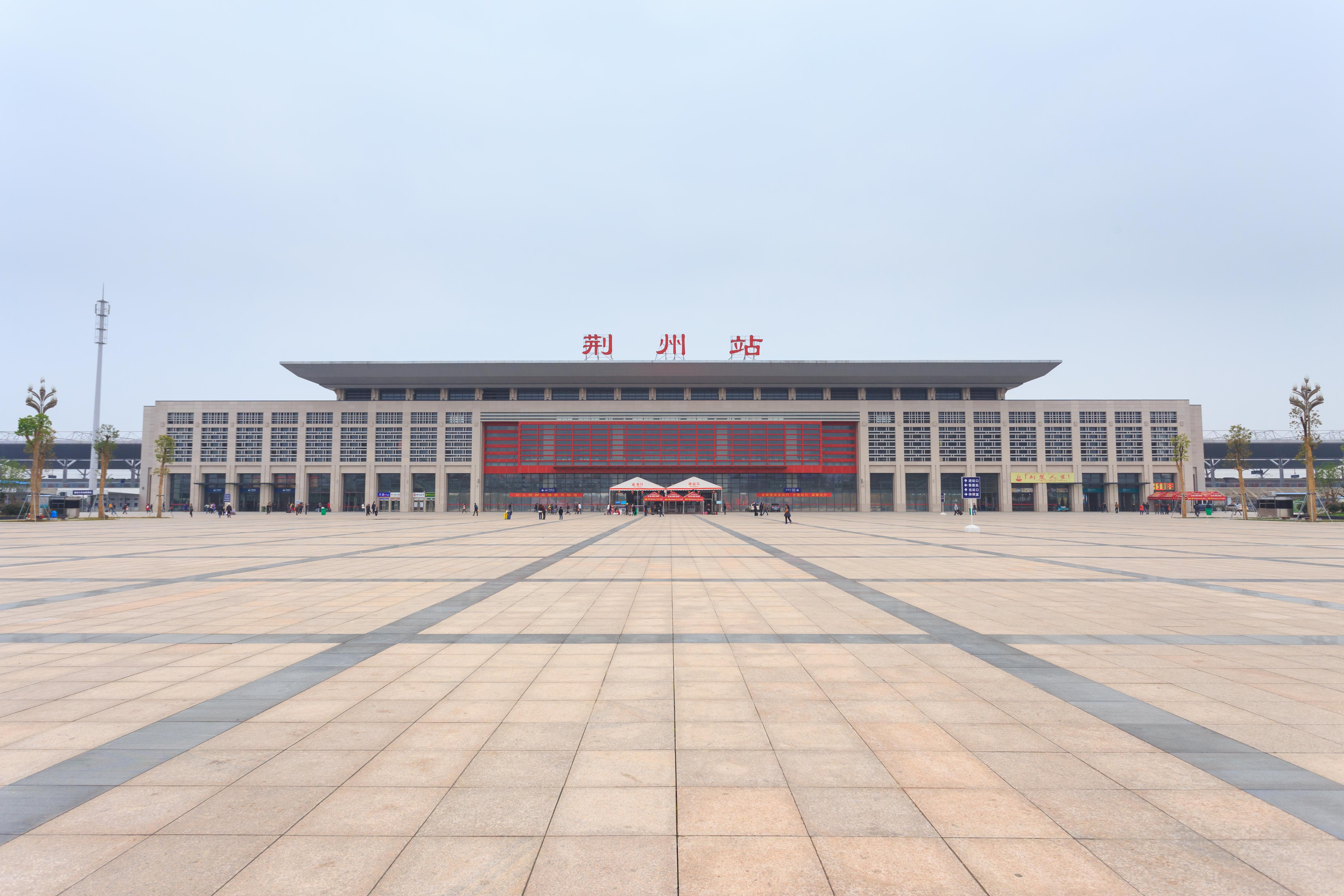

General information
- Location: Yingcheng Town, Jingzhou District, Jingzhou, Hubei; China
- Coordinates: 30°22′23″N 112°12′26″E
- Operated by: China Railway Wuhan Group, China Railway Corporation
- Line(s): Wuhan–Yichang railway; Jingmen–Jingzhou high-speed railway

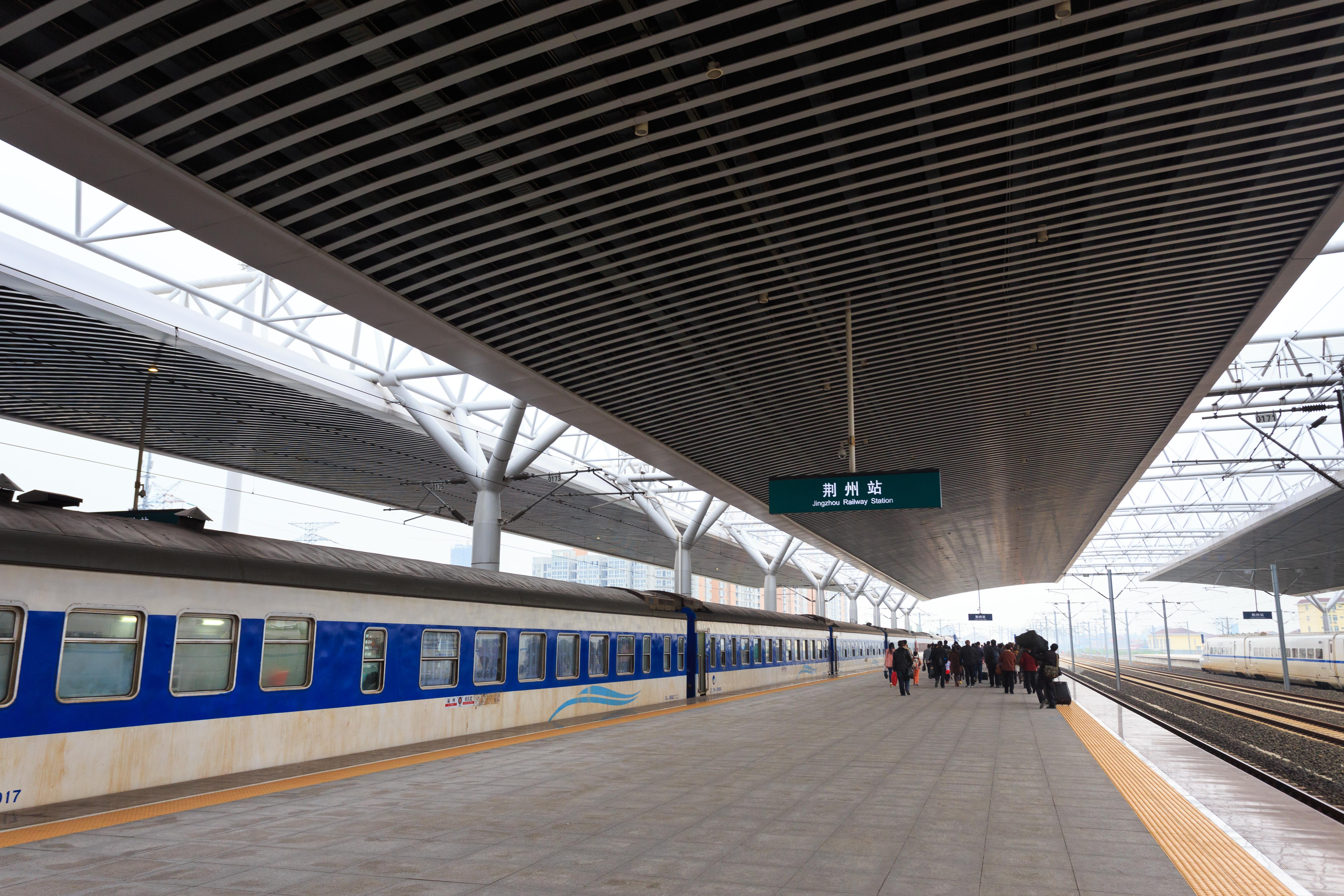
platform

Jingzhou railway station is a railway station located in Jingzhou District, Jingzhou, Hubei Province, People's Republic of China, on the Hanyi Railway which operated by China Railway Wuhan Group. It is located in Yingcheng Town of Jingzhou District, some 3 km north of Jingzhou's central business district.

== Service ==
Frequent D-series trains on the Yichang–Wuhan route; some trains continue east to Shanghai.

There is no freight service at the Jingzhou railway station, and none is planned. Instead, rail freight destined for Jingzhou is handled at the local stations of the Jingmen–Shashi railway.

== History ==
The station was opened on July 1, 2012, together with the new Wuhan–Yichang Railway. Although the station was physically close to Jingzhou's central urban area, passengers found it inconvenient due to the absence of a direct road connection. However, the new road is under construction, and is to open by the end of November 2012.

== Nearby stations ==
Jingzhou also has several freight stations on the Jingmen–Shashi railway.

== Notes ==
Preceding station	China Railway High-speed	Following station
Qianjiang towards Hankou	Wuhan–Yichang railway	Zhijiang North towards Yichang East
