= Hefei–Wuhan high-speed railway =

Railway line in China

Overview
- Native name: 合武高速铁路
- Status: Under construction
- Owner: China Railway
- Locale: Anhui province; Hubei province
- Termini: Hefei South; Hankou
- Stations: 9

Service
- Type: High-speed rail
- System: China Railway High-speed
- Operator(s): CR Wuhan

Technical
- Line length: 360.517 km (224.015 mi)
- Number of tracks: 2 (Double-track)
- Track gauge: 1,435 mm (4 ft 8 1/2 in) standard gauge
- Minimum radius: generally 7,000 m (4.3 mi) or 5,500 m (3.4 mi) on difficult sections
- Electrification: 25 kV 50 Hz AC (Overhead line)
- Operating speed: 350 kilometres per hour (220 mph)
- Signalling: ABS
- Maximum incline: 2%

The Hefei–Wuhan high-speed railway (also referred to in Chinese as the Hewu high-speed railway) is a high-speed railway line between Hefei South and Hankou currently under construction in China. The line is 342 kilometres (213 miles) long and has a design speed of 350 kilometres per hour (220 mph). It will form part of the Shanghai–Chongqing–Chengdu high-speed railway. On 2 January 2024, the railway started construction and it is expected to be completed in 2028. It will parallel the higher-speed Hefei–Wuhan railway.
