= Zhijiang North railway station =

Railway station in Zhijiang, Hubei, China

Coordinates: 30°25′50″N 111°45′08″E

Zhijiangbei 枝江北
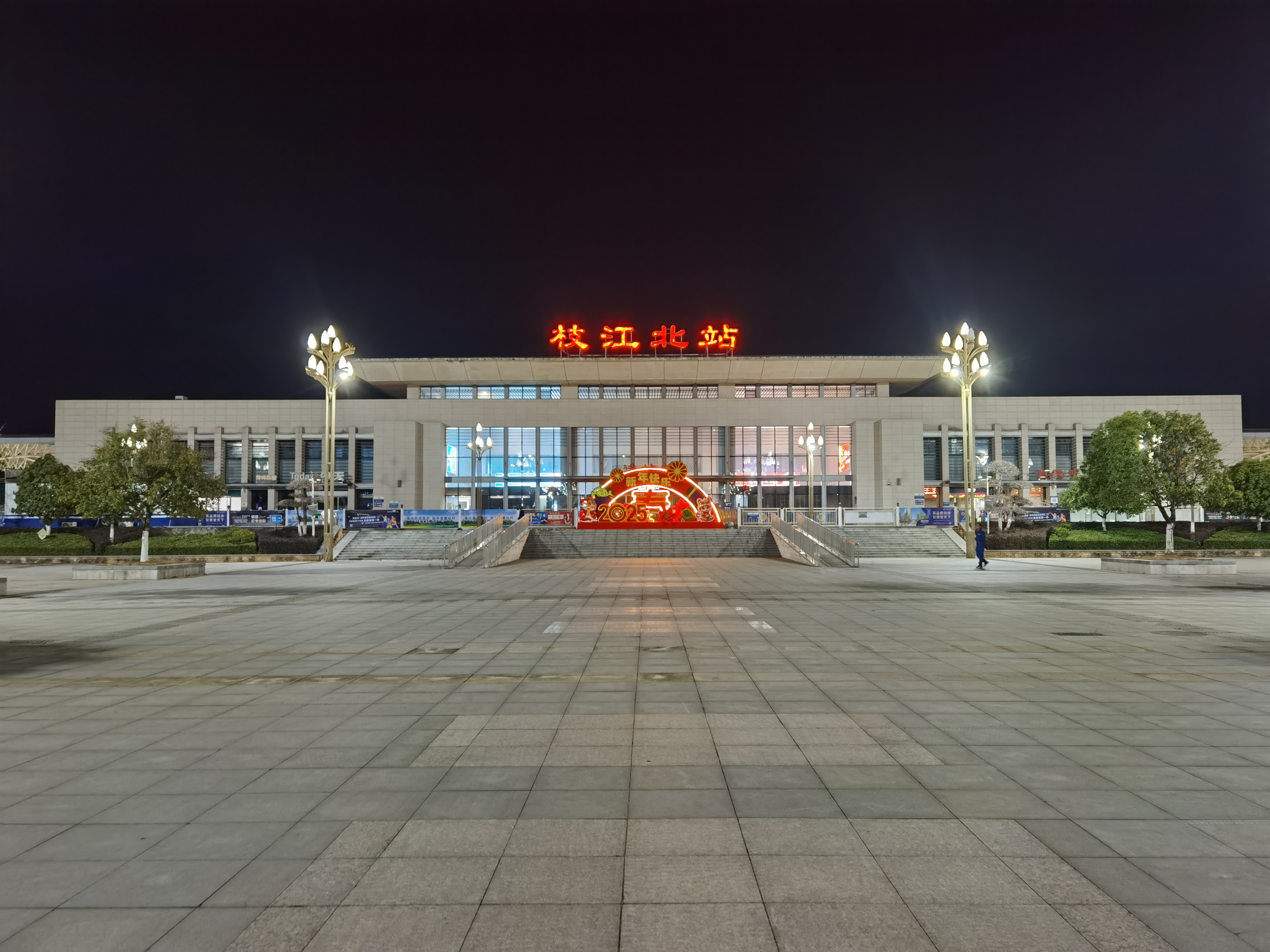

General information
- Location: Zhijiang, Hubei, Hubei; China
- Operated by: Wuhan Railway Bureau, China Railway Corporation
- Line: Hanyi Railway
Location

Zhijiang North railway station is a railway station, which is located in Zhijiang City, which is part of the Yichang prefecture-level city, Hubei Province, People's Republic of China. It is served by the Hanyi Railway (construction of which started in 2008), which operated by Wuhan Railway Bureau, China Railway Corporation.

== History ==
The station opened on July 1, 2012.

Preceding station	China Railway High-speed	Following station
Jingzhou towards Hankou	Wuhan–Yichang railway	Yichang East Terminus
