= Yichang railway station =

Railway station in Yichang, China

Coordinates: 30.7021°N 111.2988°E

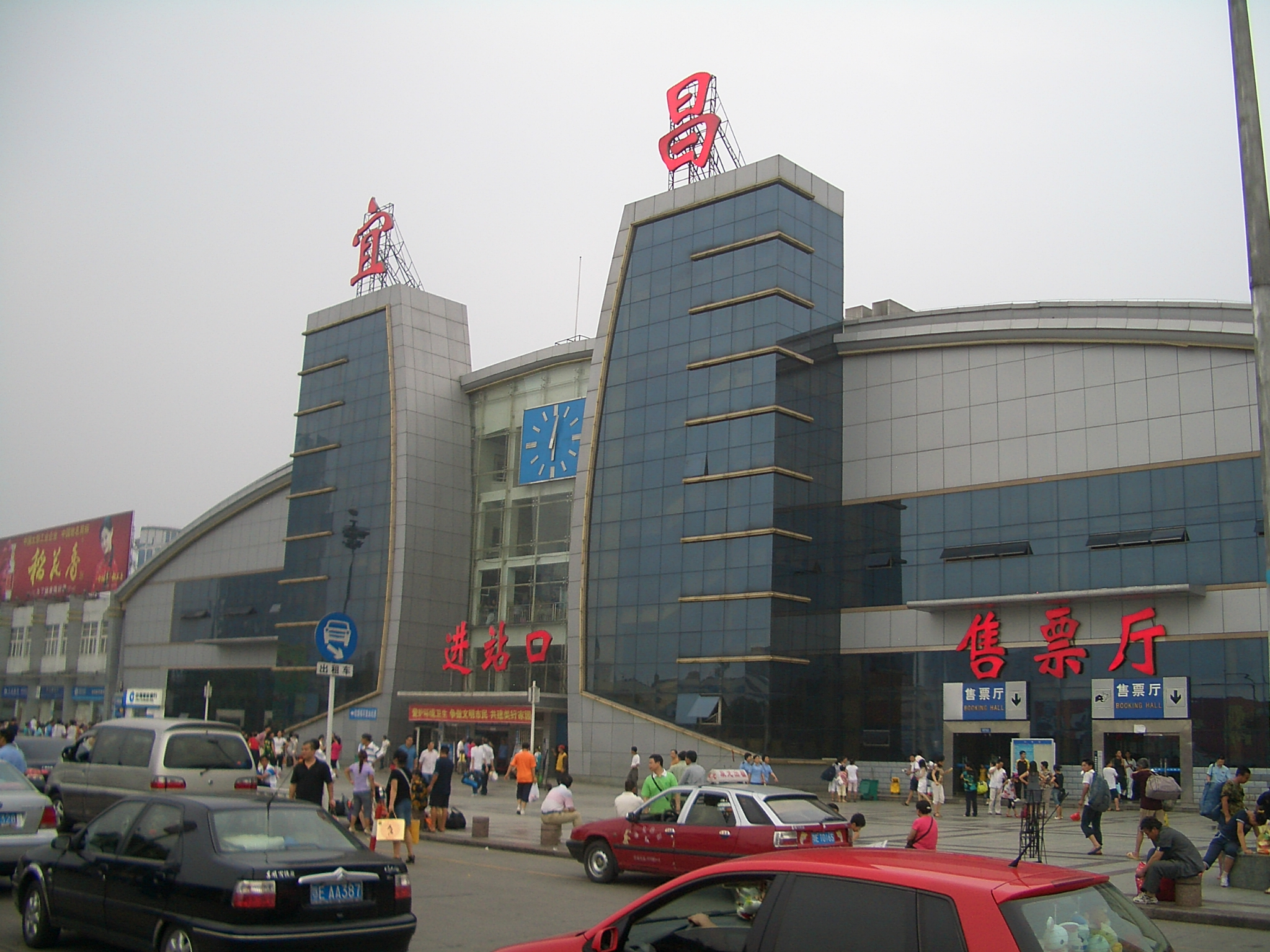
Yichang railway station in 2009

Yichang railway station is the railway station in downtown Yichang, Hubei province. Since October 2012, it has been closed to passengers.

Yichang railway station was the first, and for several decades the only, passenger train station in Yichang. Its construction started in 1970, and it was opened for service in 1971. It remained the main (and only) passenger station in the Yichang area until the opening of the Yichang East railway station in Yichang's eastern suburbs in late 2010. After that, services at Yichang railway station were gradually reduced, as most trains now terminated at Yichang East. Finally with the opening of the Hanyi Railway on July 1, 2012, Yichang railway station was closed for renovations. The renovation project actually started in October 2012 and was expected to take a few months. Along with the renovation of Yichang Station, the pedestrian overpasses over the tracks connecting Yichang station with Yichang East are constructed, in order to make it possible for the line to be used by high-speed EMU (i.e., D-series) trains. This probably means that Yichang railway station will eventually become the terminal for many of the Hankou-Yichang Railway trains, which currently (2012) terminate at Yichang East.
