= Sanyuan =

Sanyuan may refer to:

- Sanyuan, Longshan County, township in Longshan County, Hunan, China
- Sanyuan, Huilong a village in Huilong, Hanchuan, Xiaogan, Hubei, China
- Sanyuan Bridge, overpass on the 3rd Ring Road, Beijing, China
- Sanyuan County, in Shaanxi, China
- Sanyuan District, in Sanming, Fujian, China
- Sanyuan Group, Chinese state-owned group of companies based on agriculture & animal-husbandry
