= Xiangyang railway station =

Railway station in Xiangyang, Hubei, China

Xiangyang 襄阳
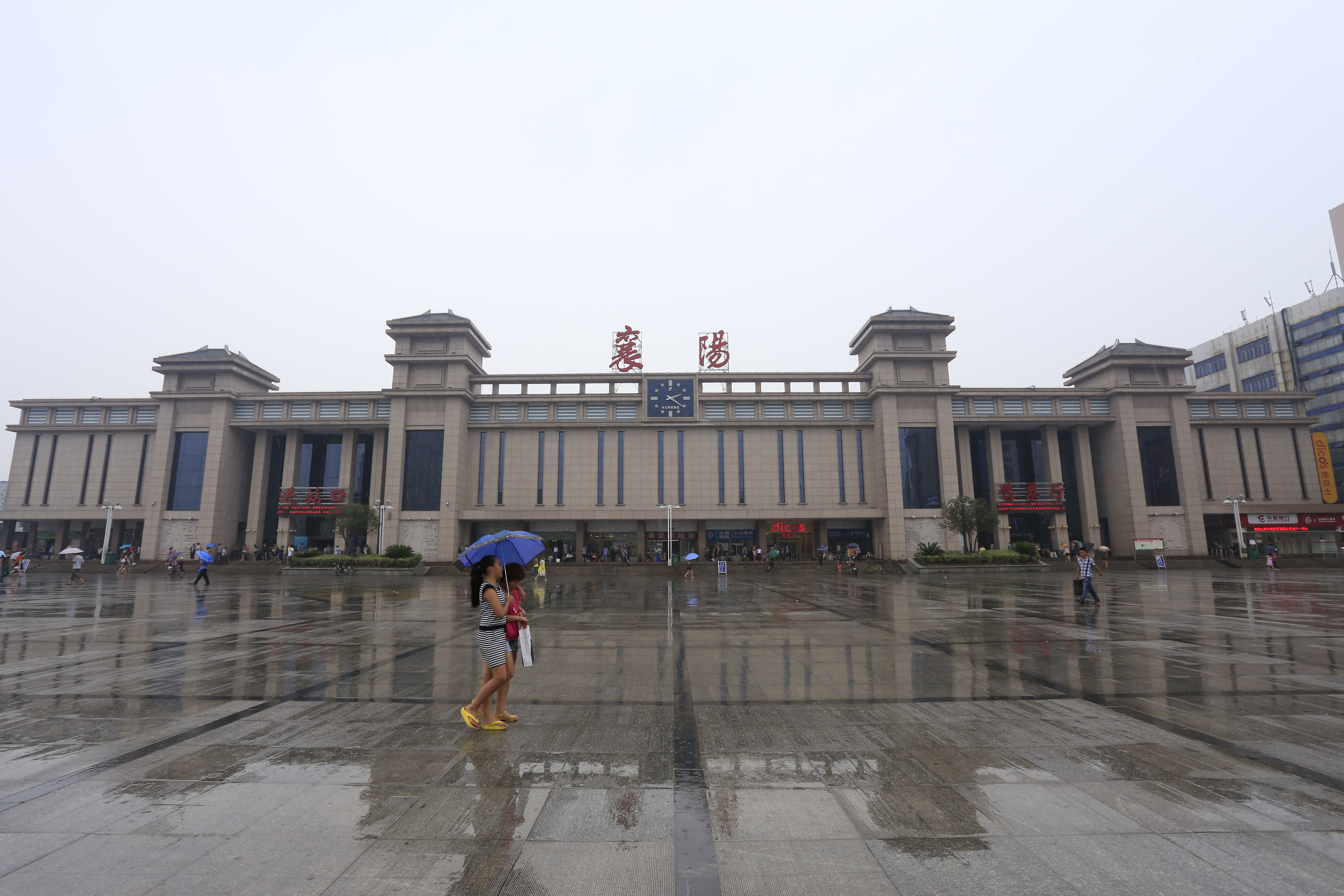

General information
- Location: Fancheng District, Xiangyang, Hubei; China
- Coordinates: 32°3′21″N 112°9′20″E
- Operator: CR Wuhan
- Lines: Xiangyang–Chongqing railway; Jiaozuo–Liuzhou railway; Hankou–Danjiangkou railway
- Platforms: 4

Other information
- Station code: 29450 (TMIS code); XFN (telegraph code); XYA (Pinyin code)
- Classification: Class 1 station (一等站)

History
- Opened: 1960
Location

Xiangyang railway station (Chinese: 襄阳站) is a railway station in Fancheng District, Xiangyang, Hubei, China. It is a railway station on the Xiangyang–Chongqing railway, the Jiaozuo–Liuzhou railway and the Hankou–Danjiangkou railway.

== History ==
The construction of Fancheng railway station (樊城站) started in 1958 and was completed in 1960. The station was renamed to Xiangfan railway station (襄樊站) in 1966, and to Xiangyang railway station on 8 June 2011, following the renaming of the city.
