= Xiantao =

Xiantao 仙桃市
- County-level & Sub-prefectural city
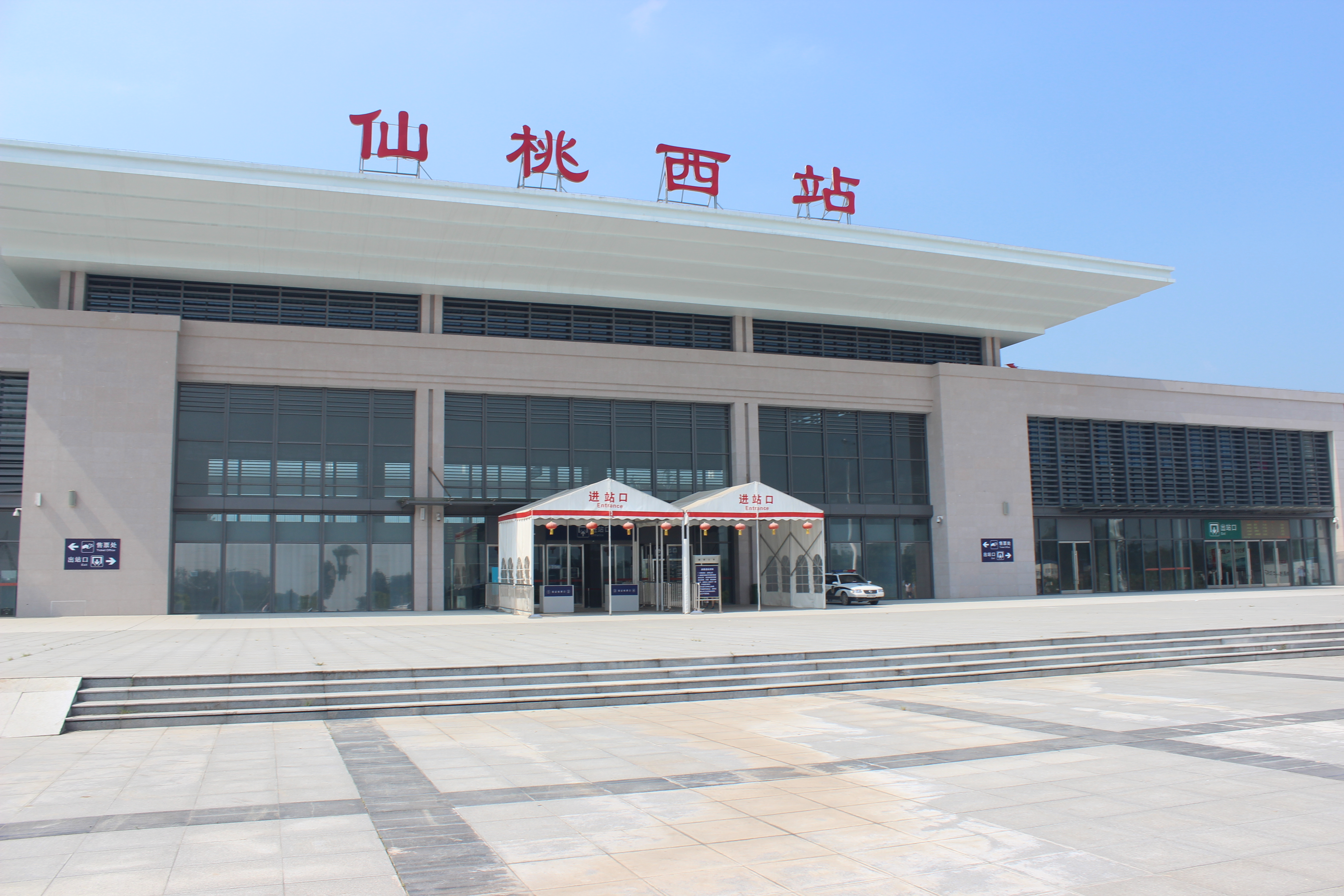
- Xiantao West Railway Station

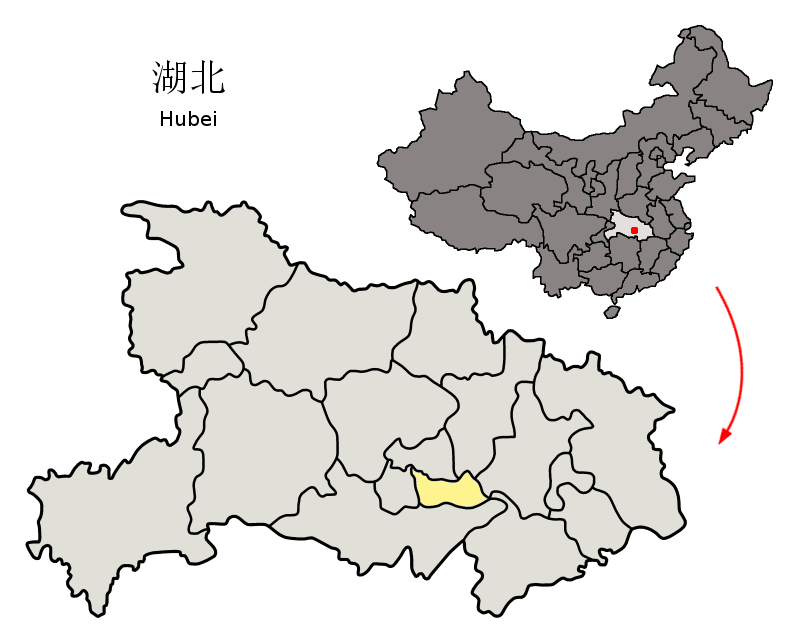
- Location of Xiantao City jurisdiction in Hubei

- Location of the city centre in Hubei
- Coordinates: 30°19′41″N 113°26′35″E
- Country: People's Republic of China
- Province: Hubei

Area
  - County-level & Sub-prefectural city: 2,538 km^{2} (980 sq mi)
  - Urban: 240.00 km^{2} (92.66 sq mi)
- Elevation: 31 m (102 ft)

Population (2020)
  - County-level & Sub-prefectural city: 1,268,715
  - Density: 499.9/km^{2} (1,295/sq mi)
  - Urban: 752,155

GDP
  - County-level & Sub-prefectural city: CN¥ 59.8 billion US$ 9.6 billion
  - Per capita: CN¥ 51,496; US$ 8,268
- Time zone: UTC+8 (China Standard)
- Website: 仙桃市人民政府门户网站 (translation: Xiantao City People's Government Web Portal) (in Simplified Chinese)

Xiantao (Chinese: 仙桃; pinyin: Xiāntáo) is a sub-prefecture-level city in the east of Hubei province, China. Located at the Jianghan Plain in the middle of Hubei province and spanning 112°55' – 113°49' east longitude and 30°04' – 30°32' north latitude, Xiantao City covers an area of 2,538 km^{2} (980 sq mi). Xiantao is the hometown of author Chi Li and entrepreneur Lei Jun.

== History ==
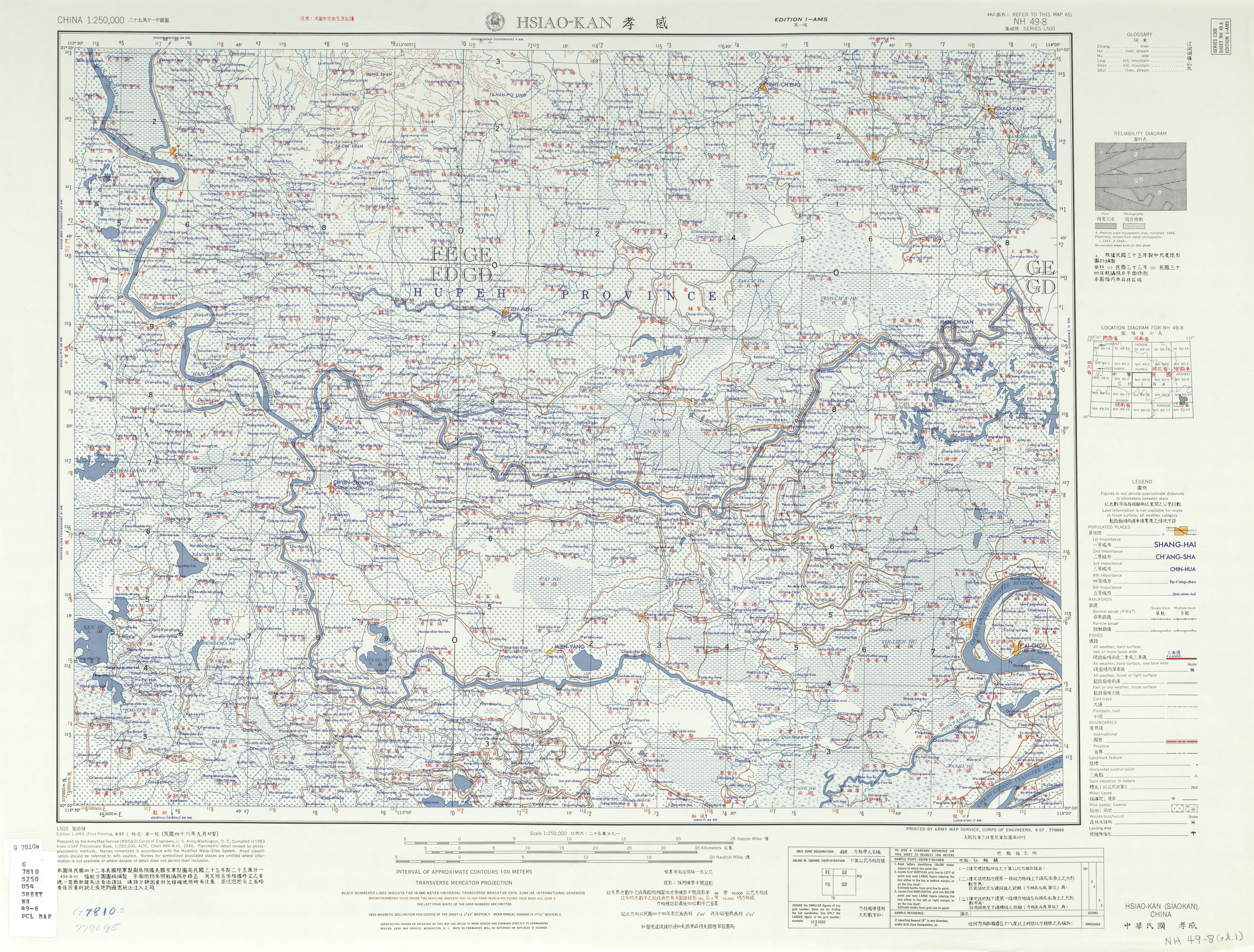
Map including Xiantao (labeled as MIEN-YANG 沔陽) (1953)

Xiantao was known as Mianyang (simplified Chinese: 沔阳; traditional Chinese: 沔陽; pinyin: Miǎnyáng) until 1986.

== Geography ==
It is close to the provincial capital of Wuhan, and only one hour drive from the Wuhan Tianhe International Airport, Hankou Railway Station and Changjiang—Wuhan Port. The G4 Beijing–Hong Kong and Macau Expressway running and the G42 Shanghai–Chengdu Expressway cross near Xiantao city.

=== Administrative divisions ===
Xiantao administers:

#	Name (Standard Mandarin)	Chinese (S)	Pinyin Romanization
Subdistricts
1	Shazui Subdistrict	沙嘴街道	Shāzuǐ Jiēdào
2	Ganhe Subdistrict	干河街道	Gān/Gànhé Jiēdào
3	Longhuashan Subdistrict	龙华山街道	Lónghuáshān Jiēdào
Towns
4	Zhengchang Town	郑场镇	Zhèngcháng/chǎng Zhèn
5	Maozui Town	毛嘴镇	Máozuǐ Zhèn
6	Louhe Town	剅河镇 (豆河镇)	Lóuhé Zhèn
7	Sanfutan Town Dog days Pond	三伏潭镇	Sānfú Zhèn
8	Huchang Town	胡场镇	Húcháng/chǎng Zhèn
9	Changtangkou Town	长埫口镇 (长倘口镇)	Chángtǎngkǒu Zhèn
10	Xiliuhe Town	西流河镇	Xīliúhé Zhèn
11	Shahu Town Sand Lake	沙湖镇	Shāhú Zhèn
12	Yanglinwei Town	杨林尾镇	Yánglínwěi Zhèn
13	Pengchang Town	彭场镇	Péngcháng/chǎng Zhèn
14	Zhanggou Town	张沟镇	Zhānggōu Zhèn
15	Guohe Town Guo River	郭河镇	Guōhé Zhèn
16	Miancheng Huizu Town	沔城回族镇	Miǎnchéng Huízú Zhèn
17	Tonghaikou Town (T'ung-hai-k'ou)	通海口镇	Tōnghǎikǒu Zhèn
18	Chenchang Town	陈场镇	Chéncháng/chǎng Zhèn
Other Areas
19	Xiantao Industrial Park Zone	仙桃工业园区	Xiāntáo Gōngyè Yuánqū
20	Jiuheyuan Seed Stock Station	九合垸原种场	Jiǔhéyuàn Yuánzhǒngcháng/chǎng
21	Shahu Seed Stock Station Sand Lake	沙湖原种场	Shāhú Yuánzhǒngcháng/chǎng
22	Paihu Scenic Area Pai Lake	排湖风景区	Páihú Yuánzhǒngcháng/chǎng
23	Wuhu Fishery Five Lake	五湖渔场	Wǔhú Yúchǎng
24	Zhaoxiyuan Forestry Area	赵西垸林场	Zhàoxīyuàn Línchǎng
25	Liujiayuan Forestry Area Liu Family Dyke	刘家垸林场	Liújiāyuàn Línchǎng
26	Chuqinliang Seed Stock Station	畜禽良种场	Chùqínliáng Yuánzhǒngcháng/chǎng

Former town: Xiachabu/Xiazhabu (Hsia-cha-fou) (下查埠镇)

=== Climate ===
Climate data for Xiantao, elevation 24 m (79 ft), (1991–2020 normals, extremes 1981–present)
Month	Jan	Feb	Mar	Apr	May	Jun	Jul	Aug	Sep	Oct	Nov	Dec	Year
Record high °C (°F)	21.3 (70.3)	27.3 (81.1)	32.8 (91.0)	33.5 (92.3)	35.5 (95.9)	37.0 (98.6)	38.3 (100.9)	39.3 (102.7)	37.0 (98.6)	33.8 (92.8)	30.2 (86.4)	22.7 (72.9)	39.3 (102.7)
Mean daily maximum °C (°F)	8.1 (46.6)	11.1 (52.0)	15.9 (60.6)	22.2 (72.0)	27.0 (80.6)	30.0 (86.0)	32.5 (90.5)	32.2 (90.0)	28.5 (83.3)	23.2 (73.8)	16.9 (62.4)	10.7 (51.3)	21.5 (70.8)
Daily mean °C (°F)	4.3 (39.7)	7.1 (44.8)	11.5 (52.7)	17.6 (63.7)	22.6 (72.7)	26.1 (79.0)	28.8 (83.8)	28.2 (82.8)	24.0 (75.2)	18.4 (65.1)	12.3 (54.1)	6.5 (43.7)	17.3 (63.1)
Mean daily minimum °C (°F)	1.5 (34.7)	4.0 (39.2)	8.2 (46.8)	13.9 (57.0)	19.0 (66.2)	23.1 (73.6)	25.9 (78.6)	25.1 (77.2)	20.7 (69.3)	15.1 (59.2)	9.0 (48.2)	3.4 (38.1)	14.1 (57.3)
Record low °C (°F)	−10.5 (13.1)	−5.4 (22.3)	−1.1 (30.0)	1.8 (35.2)	8.9 (48.0)	12.8 (55.0)	19.0 (66.2)	16.0 (60.8)	10.6 (51.1)	2.8 (37.0)	−2.9 (26.8)	−9.3 (15.3)	−10.5 (13.1)
Average precipitation mm (inches)	50.4 (1.98)	62.8 (2.47)	89.1 (3.51)	139.8 (5.50)	170.8 (6.72)	200.0 (7.87)	222.2 (8.75)	99.7 (3.93)	73.1 (2.88)	66.1 (2.60)	56.9 (2.24)	29.5 (1.16)	1,260.4 (49.61)
Average precipitation days (≥ 0.1 mm)	9.9	10.4	12.9	11.9	12.8	11.6	10.0	8.5	8.0	9.5	9.4	7.5	122.4
Average snowy days	4.7	2.7	0.8	0	0	0	0	0	0	0	0.3	1.4	9.9
Average relative humidity (%)	75	75	76	76	75	79	79	79	76	75	75	72	76
Mean monthly sunshine hours	97.5	96.1	122.2	154.6	167.2	165.4	222.9	222.5	167.7	148.9	130.3	119.7	1,815
Percentage possible sunshine	30	30	33	40	39	39	52	55	46	43	41	38	41
Source: China Meteorological Administration

== Demographics ==
As of 2006, the population of Xiantao was 1,480,100. Of this, the urban population was 593,500 and the rural population was 886,600. As of 2016, the population of Xiantao was 1.5635 million.

== Sports ==
Xiantao has been described as a "Gymnastics town", because it has cultivated several gymnastics champions, such as Li Xiaoshuang, Li Dashuang, and Yang Wei.

== Transportation ==
- China National Highway 318
- Xiantao West railway station on the Wuhan–Yichang railway (Hankou-Yichang)
- Xiantao railway station on the Wuhan–Xiantao intercity railway
- Jianghan Plain railway (freight only)

== Notable people ==
- Chi Li (池莉; born 1957), writer
- Yuan Huazhi (袁华智; born 1961), People's Liberation Army Navy admiral
- Lei Jun (雷军; born 1969), billionaire entrepreneur and computer engineer
- Li Dashuang (李大双; born 1973), artistic gymnast
- Li Xiaoshuang (李小双; born 1973), artistic gymnast
- Mickey He (何敏; born 1976), actor and singer
- Zheng Lihui (郑李辉; born 1978), artistic gymnast
- Yang Wei (杨威; born 1980), artistic gymnast
- Liao Hui (廖辉; 1987), weightlifter
- Chang Yani (昌雅妮; born 2001), diver
