= Xiaogan East railway station =

Railway station in Hubei

Xiaogan East 孝感东站
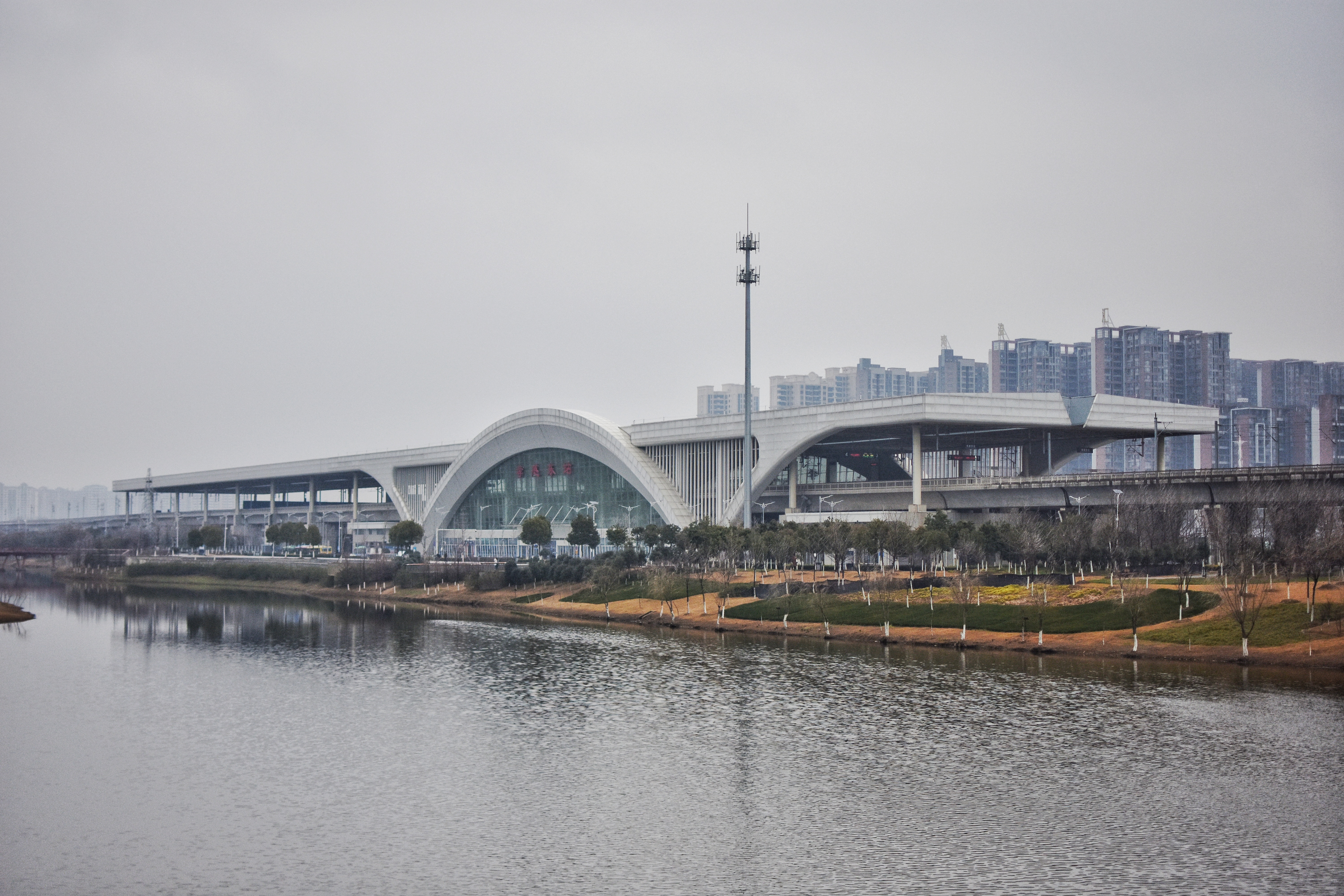
- Distant view of the station building

General information
- Location: Xiaonan District, Xiaogan, Hubei; China
- Coordinates: 30°56′11.93″N 113°56′30.84″E
- Operator: CR Wuhan Group
- Line: Wuhan–Xiaogan ICR
- Platforms: 4

History
- Opened: 1 December 2016
Location

Xiaogan East Station (Chinese: 孝感东站) is located in Xiaonan District, Xiaogan, Hubei, China. It is a station on the Wuhan–Xiaogan intercity railway. The station is 61.8 km (38.4 mi) from Hankou station, and the station building is designed to accommodate a maximum of 1,500 people.

The station opened on 1 December 2016, initially operating 10 trains to Hankou. Starting from 21 September 2017, the station added a pair of high-speed trains to Guangzhou South.

== Station structure ==
Xiaogan East Station has a total of 2 platforms and 4 tracks. The two main lines of the Wuhan-Xiaogan Intercity Railway are also used as departure and arrival tracks. The corresponding platforms of the main lines are equipped with half-height platform screen doors.
