= Hanchuan =

Hanchuan 汉川市 Hanchwan
- County-level city
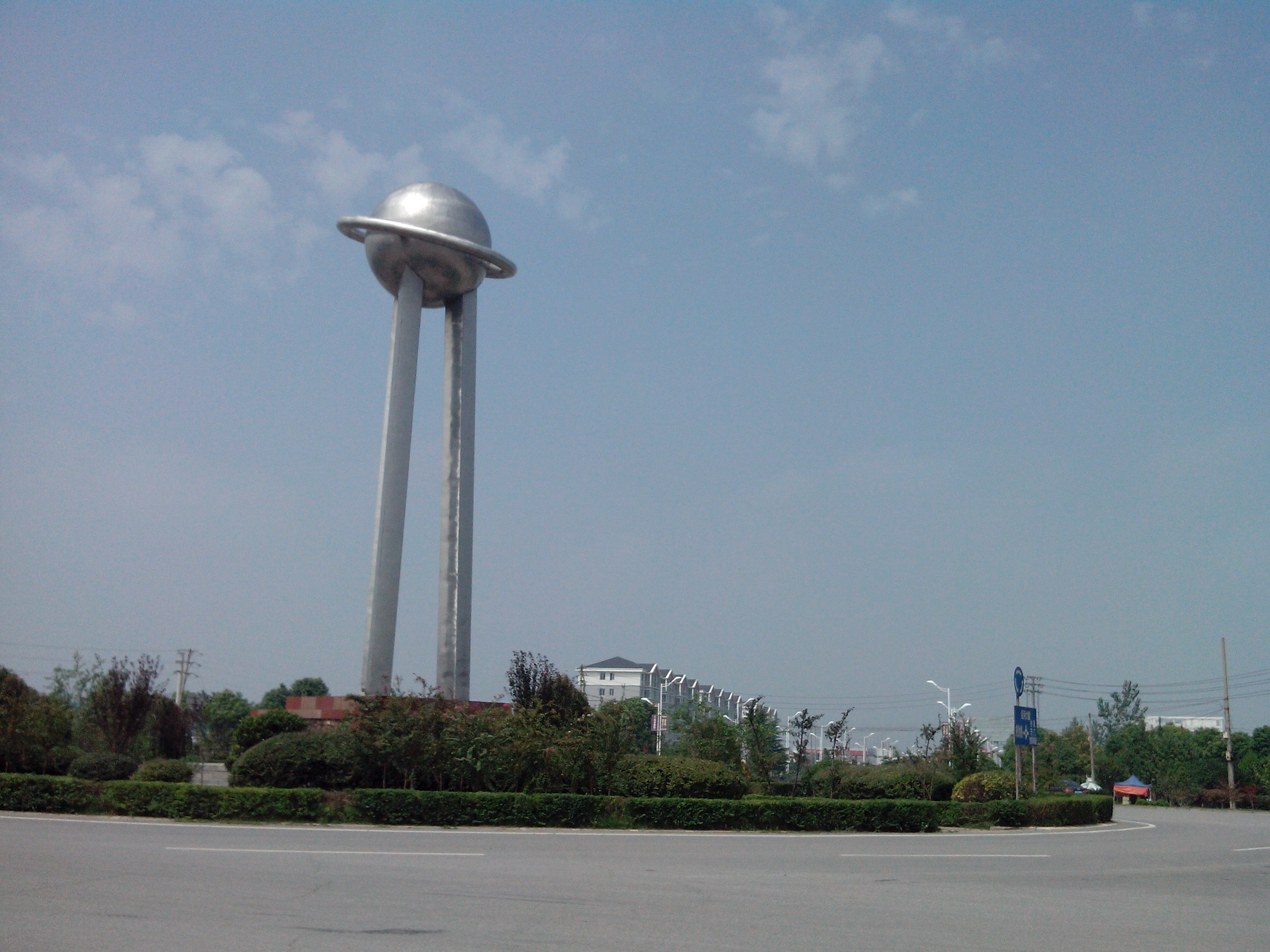

- Location in Hubei
- Coordinates: 30°40′N 113°50′E
- Country: People's Republic of China
- Province: Hubei
- Prefecture-level city: Xiaogan

Area
  - County-level city: 1,655 km^{2} (639 sq mi)
  - Urban: 84.60 km^{2} (32.66 sq mi)

Population (2020)
  - County-level city: 903,296
  - Density: 545.8/km^{2} (1,414/sq mi)
  - Urban: 547,969
- Time zone: UTC+8 (China Standard)
- Website: www.hanchuan.gov.cn

Hanchuan (simplified Chinese: 汉川; traditional Chinese: 漢川; pinyin: Hànchuān) is a county-level city in east-central Hubei province, People's Republic of China. It is under the administration of Xiaogan prefecture-level city. The city's urban area is located on the left bank of the Han River a few tens of kilometres upstream from Wuhan. However, the county-level city as an administrative unit also includes some land on the right bank of the river as well. The city has been served by the Hanchuan railway station on the Wuhan–Yichang railway. Hanchuan is a sister city of Martinez, California, United States. The city is the birth place of OnePlus CEO Pete Lau.

== Administrative divisions ==
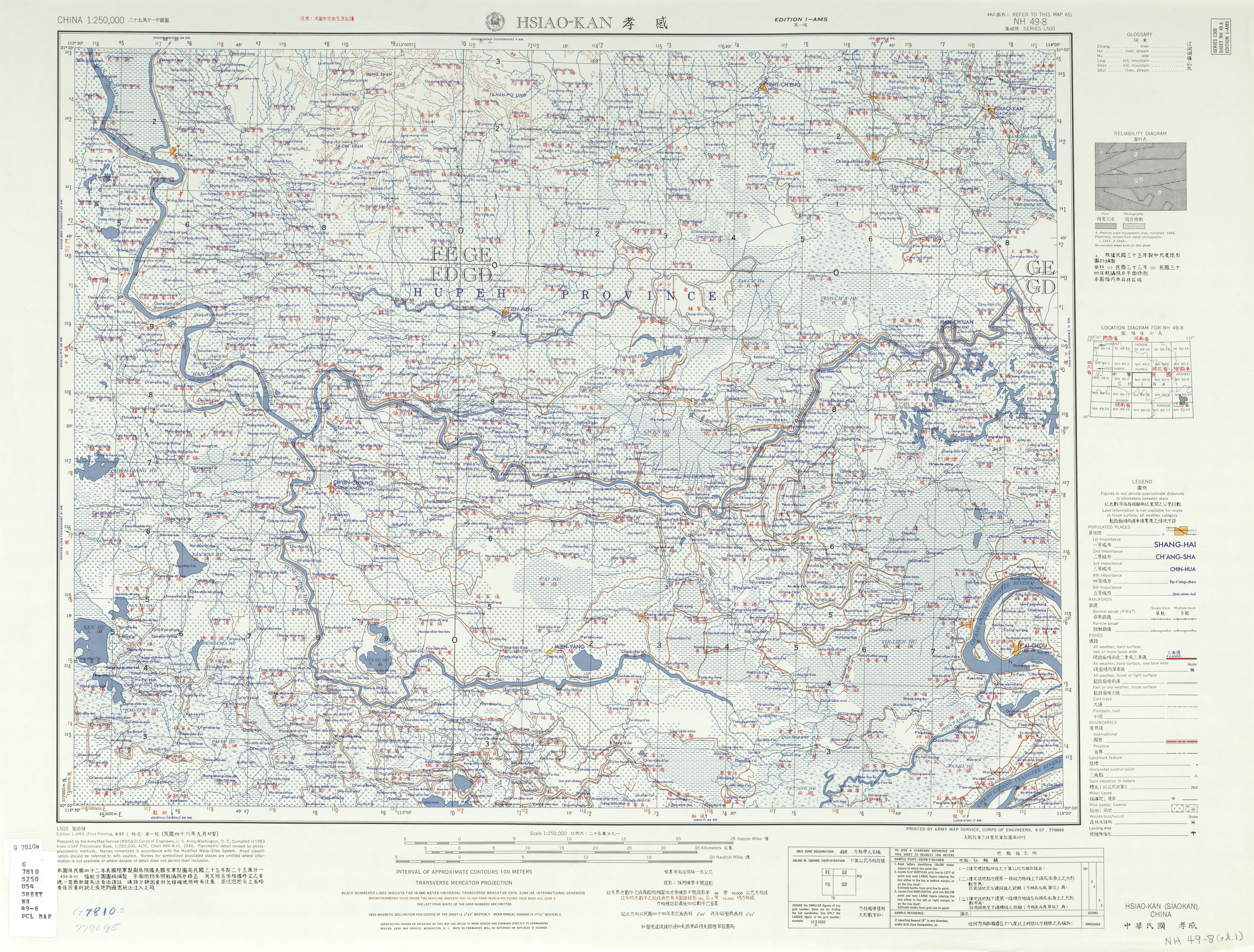
Map including Hanchuan (labeled as HAN-CH'UAN (HANCHWAN) 漢川) (1953)

Two subdistricts:

- Xiannüshan Subdistrict (仙女山街道) and Diaodong Subdistrict (汈东街道)

Fourteen towns:

- Makou (马口镇), Maiwang (脉旺镇), Chenghuang (城隍镇), Fenshui (分水镇), Chenhu (沉湖镇), Tian'erhe (田二河镇), Huilong (回龙镇), Xinyan (新堰镇), Tongzhong (垌冢镇/垌塚镇), Mahe (麻河镇), Liujiage (刘家隔镇), Xinhe (新河镇), Miaotou (庙头镇), Yanglingou (杨林沟镇)

Six townships:

- Xijiang Township (西江乡), Wantan Township (湾潭乡), Nanhe Township (南河乡), Ma'an Township (马鞍乡), Litan Township (里潭乡), Hanji Township (韩集乡)

Five other areas:

- Hanchuan Economic and Technological Development Zone (汉川市经济技术开发区), Diaocha Lake Breeding Farm (汈汊湖养殖场), Huayan Farm (华严农场), Sanxingyuan Farm (三星垸农场), Zhongzhou Farm (中洲农场)

== Climate ==
Climate data for Hanchuan, elevation 25 m (82 ft), (1991–2020 normals, extremes 1981–present)
Month	Jan	Feb	Mar	Apr	May	Jun	Jul	Aug	Sep	Oct	Nov	Dec	Year
Record high °C (°F)	20.5 (68.9)	28.2 (82.8)	33.0 (91.4)	32.7 (90.9)	35.5 (95.9)	37.4 (99.3)	38.5 (101.3)	38.2 (100.8)	37.3 (99.1)	34.0 (93.2)	29.2 (84.6)	22.6 (72.7)	38.5 (101.3)
Mean daily maximum °C (°F)	8.1 (46.6)	11.2 (52.2)	16.0 (60.8)	22.4 (72.3)	27.0 (80.6)	30.0 (86.0)	32.6 (90.7)	32.5 (90.5)	28.6 (83.5)	23.1 (73.6)	16.8 (62.2)	10.6 (51.1)	21.6 (70.8)
Daily mean °C (°F)	3.9 (39.0)	6.7 (44.1)	11.3 (52.3)	17.5 (63.5)	22.4 (72.3)	26.0 (78.8)	28.8 (83.8)	28.1 (82.6)	23.8 (74.8)	18.1 (64.6)	11.8 (53.2)	6.0 (42.8)	17.0 (62.7)
Mean daily minimum °C (°F)	0.9 (33.6)	3.3 (37.9)	7.6 (45.7)	13.4 (56.1)	18.5 (65.3)	22.6 (72.7)	25.6 (78.1)	24.8 (76.6)	20.2 (68.4)	14.3 (57.7)	8.0 (46.4)	2.6 (36.7)	13.5 (56.3)
Record low °C (°F)	−13.6 (7.5)	−9.6 (14.7)	−2.1 (28.2)	1.6 (34.9)	7.5 (45.5)	12.4 (54.3)	18.7 (65.7)	15.9 (60.6)	10.8 (51.4)	1.6 (34.9)	−3.5 (25.7)	−12.4 (9.7)	−13.6 (7.5)
Average precipitation mm (inches)	49.1 (1.93)	59.1 (2.33)	88.7 (3.49)	132.6 (5.22)	159.0 (6.26)	196.5 (7.74)	223.9 (8.81)	100.6 (3.96)	71.4 (2.81)	64.2 (2.53)	56.0 (2.20)	28.4 (1.12)	1,229.5 (48.4)
Average precipitation days (≥ 0.1 mm)	9.5	10.1	12.4	11.2	12.4	11.5	10.4	9.2	7.7	9.0	9.4	7.6	120.4
Average snowy days	4.2	2.1	0.9	0	0	0	0	0	0	0	0.3	1.3	8.8
Average relative humidity (%)	76	76	76	75	76	80	80	80	77	77	77	74	77
Mean monthly sunshine hours	95.8	96.1	126.2	149.3	159.1	149.7	204.0	209.9	160.4	142.2	129.3	116.6	1,738.6
Percentage possible sunshine	30	30	34	38	37	35	48	52	44	41	41	37	39
Source: China Meteorological Administration
