= Xiaolin–Lishan railway =

Chinese, electrified rail line in Suizhou, Hubei

The Xiaolin–Lishan railway (Chinese: 小厉铁路) is a single-track railway line in Suizhou, Hubei, China. It is 70 kilometres (43 mi) long and opened at the end of 2005. The line was electrified in the mid-2010s. The line has been used for non-stop passenger services, but there are no passenger stations.

At its northern terminus near Xiaolin, it meets the Nanjing–Xi'an railway. At its southern terminus near Lishan, the line meets the Hankou–Danjiangkou railway.
