= Dazhimen railway station =

Major National Historical and Cultural Site in China

Coordinates: 30.5966°N 114.2917°E

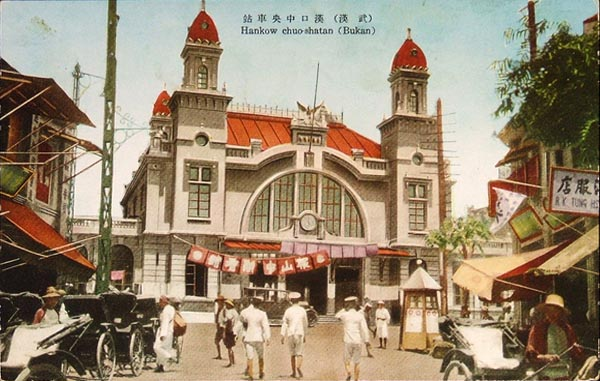
A 1927 postcard of the station

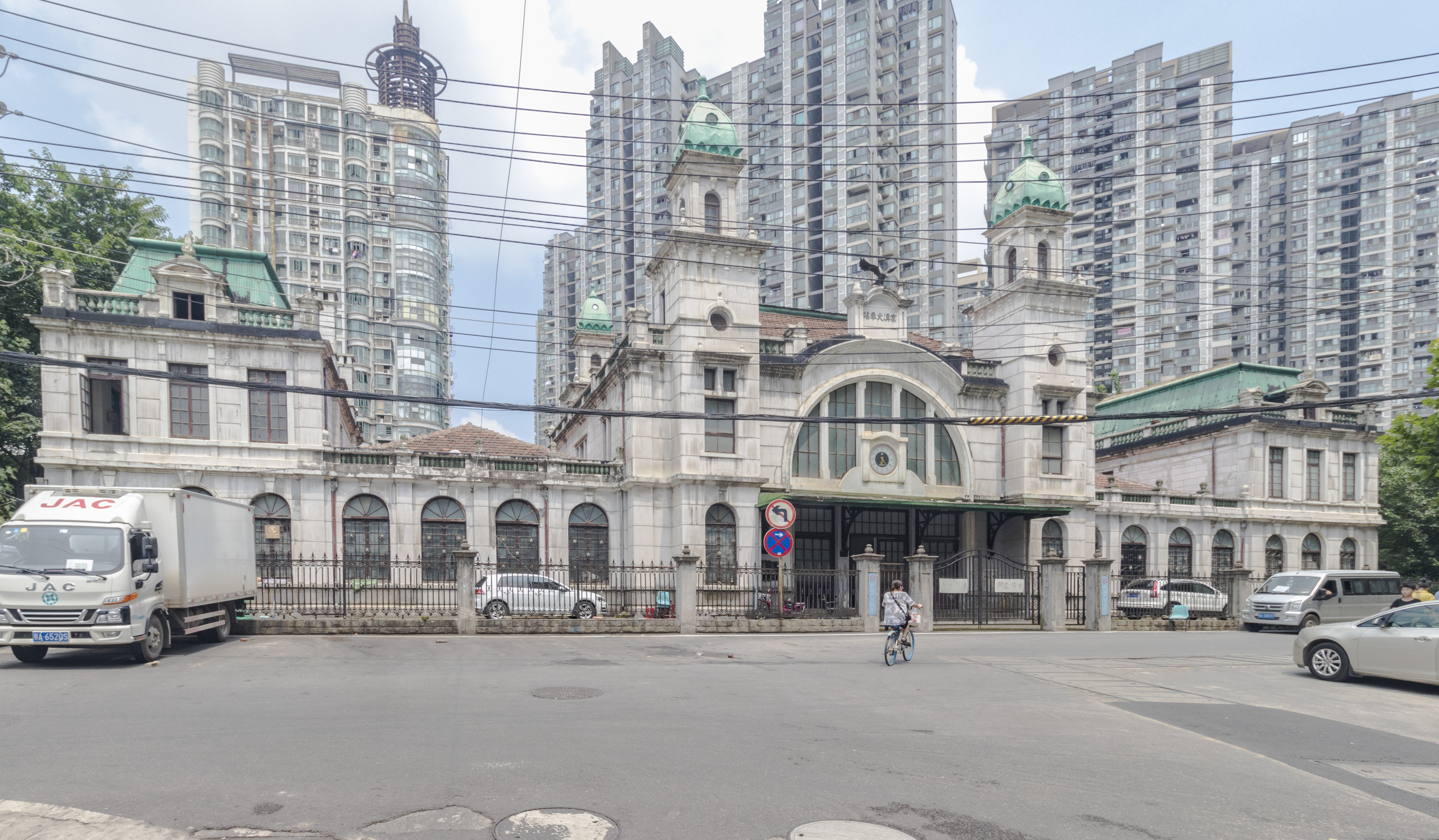
The station in 2019

Dazhimen or Ta-chih-men railway station (Chinese: 大智門火車站) in Wuhan, China, was the southern terminus of the Beijing–Hankou railway. It is located at the intersection of Jinghan Road and Chezhan Road in Jiang'an District, part of the former city of Hankou. It was built in 1900–1903 and closed in 1991, when the new Hankou railway station opened. In 2001 it was named a Major National Historical and Cultural Site.

The station building is a brick-and-wood structure of two floors, designed by French architects in a German medieval style. It has an area of 4,000 square meters, with the waiting room occupying 1,022 square meters. The whole building is symmetrical, divided crossways into five sections. There are four 20-meter-high towers at the corners of the central section.
