= Huilong, Hanchuan =

Huilong 回龙镇
- Town
- Location in Hubei
- Coordinates: 30°30′54″N 113°30′10″E
- Country: People's Republic of China
- Province: Hubei
- Prefecture-level city: Xiaogan
- County-level city: Hanchuan
- Village-level divisions: 1 residential community 18 villages

Area
  - Total: 64.53 km^{2} (24.92 sq mi)
- Elevation: 27 m (89 ft)

Population
  - Total: 37,800
  - Density: 586/km^{2} (1,520/sq mi)
- Time zone: UTC+8 (China Standard)
- Area code: 0712

Huilong (simplified Chinese: 回龙; traditional Chinese: 回龍; pinyin: Huílóng) is a town under the administration of Hanchuan City in east-central Hubei province, China, situated 16 kilometres (9.9 mi) northeast of Xiantao and about 70 km (43 mi) west of Wuhan. As of 2011, it has one residential community (居委会) and nine villages under its administration.

== Administrative divisions ==
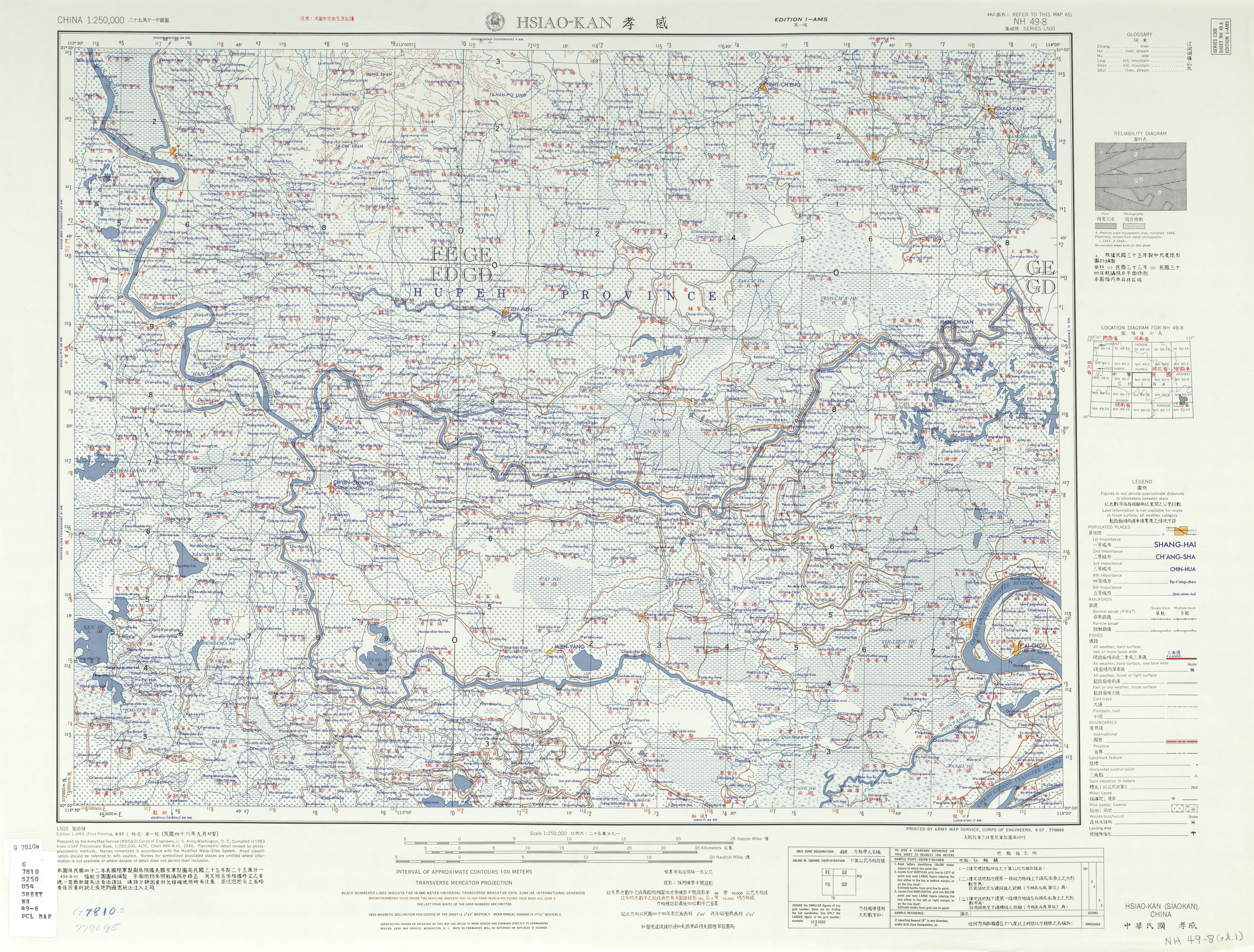
Map including Huilong area (labeled as Hui-lung-wan) (1953)

One community:

- Huilong Community (回龙居委会)

Nineteen villages:

- Yangzhan (杨占村), Sanyuan (三元村), Lutai (鲁台村), Dumiao (杜庙村), Chikou (池口村), Chapeng (茶棚村), Xinqiao (新桥村), Huilong (回龙村), Jinjiahui (金家会村), Tangwan (汤湾村), Wangyuan (王垸村), Yuhuangge (玉皇阁村), Guihuashu (桂花树村), Junyuan (均垸村), Wangyang (汪阳村), Machengtai (马城台村), Luosi (螺蛳村), Zaogang (皂港村), Chenyuan (陈园村)

== See also ==
- List of township-level divisions of Hubei
