= Hankou–Danjiangkou railway =

Railway line in China

Hankou–Danjiangkou railway 汉丹铁路
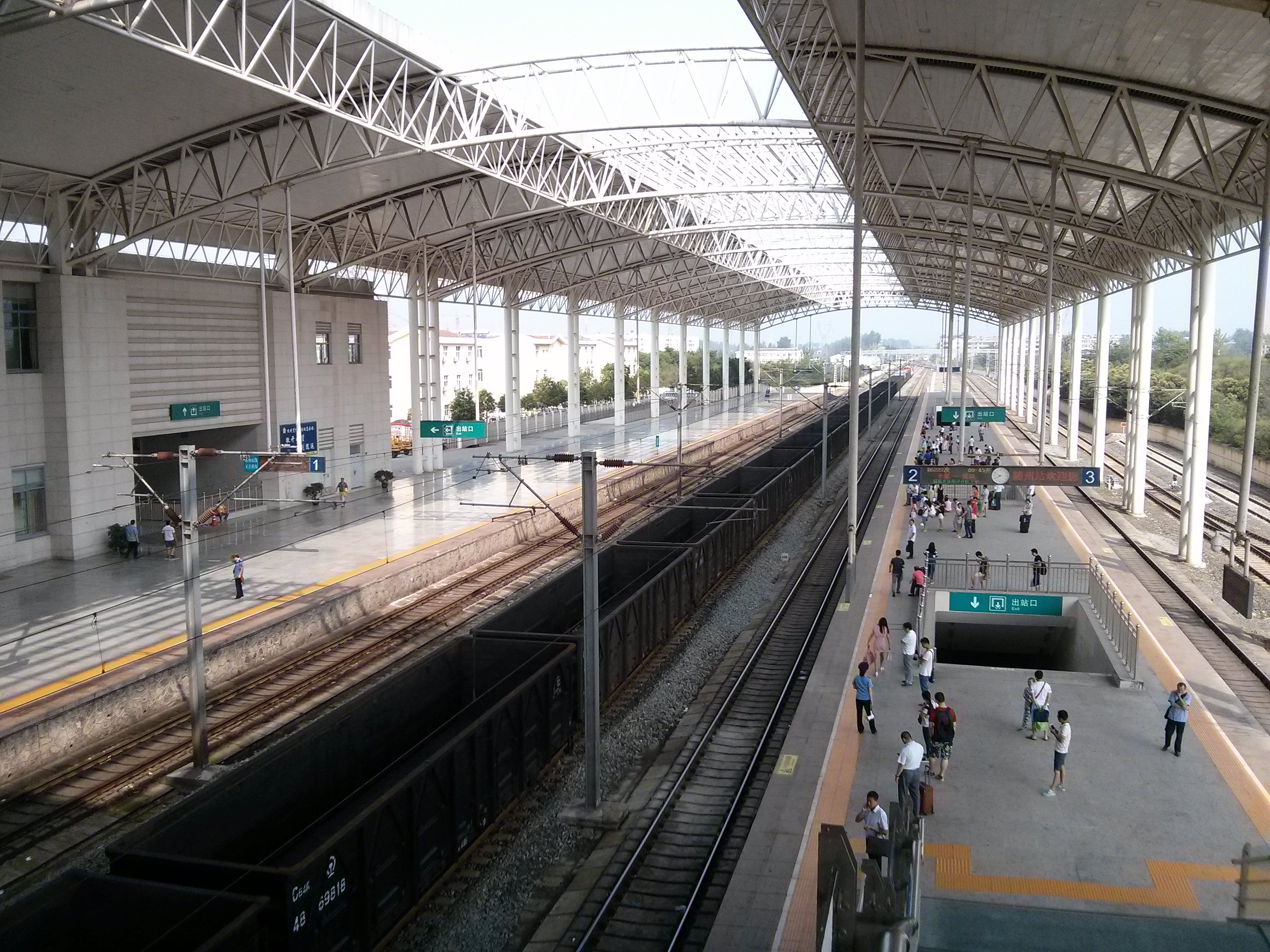
- Hankou–Danjiangkou railway in Suizhou station

Overview
- Status: Operational
- Locale: Hubei, China
- Stations: 28

Service
- Type: Heavy rail
- Operator: Wuhan Railway Bureau

History
- Opened: 1 January 1966

Technical
- Line length: 418 km (260 mi)
- Number of tracks: 2 (Hankou–Laohekou East); 1 (Laohekou East–Danjiangkou)
- Track gauge: 1,435 mm (4 ft 8 1/2 in)
- Minimum radius: 2,000 m (6,600 ft) (Hankou–Laohekou East); 300 m (980 ft) (Laohekou East–Danjiangkou)
- Electrification: 25 kV 50 Hz AC (Overhead line) not electrified: Laohekou East–Danjiangkou
- Operating speed: 200 km/h (120 mph) (Hankou–Laohekou East) (50 km/h (31 mph) (Laohekou East–Danjiangkou)
- Signalling: ABS
- Maximum incline: 0.6% (Hankou–Laohekou East); 1.2% (Laohekou East–Danjiangkou)

The Hankou–Danjiangkou railway or Handan railway (simplified Chinese: 汉丹铁路; traditional Chinese: 漢丹鐵路; pinyin: hàndān tiělù), is a railroad in central China between Wuhan and Danjiangkou in Hubei Province. The line is 411 km (255 mi) long and follows the Han River from Wuhan's Hankou District north to Danjiangkou near the border with Henan Province. The line was built from 1958 to 1966 and double-tracked in 2009. Major cities, counties and towns along route include Wuhan, Anlu, Suizhou, Zaoyang, Xiangyang, Laohekou and Danjiangkou.

This line along with Xiangyang–Chongqing Railway is the traditional route linking Sichuan and Chongqing with Eastern China. After the completion of Yichang-Wanzhou Railway the line's importance decreased slightly but many conventional trains still use this route.

== Rail connections ==
- Wuhan: Beijing–Guangzhou railway, Wuhan–Jiujiang railway, Wuhan–Guangzhou high-speed railway, Hefei–Wuhan passenger railway
- Sui County: Xiaolin–Lishan railway
- Xiangyang: Jiaozuo–Liuzhou railway, Xiangyang–Chongqing railway

== See also ==
- List of railways in China
