= Wuhan–Yichang railway =

Higher-speed railway line in China

Wuhan-Yichang railway Wuhan–Yichang section of the Shanghai–Wuhan–Chengdu passenger railway
- CRH logo
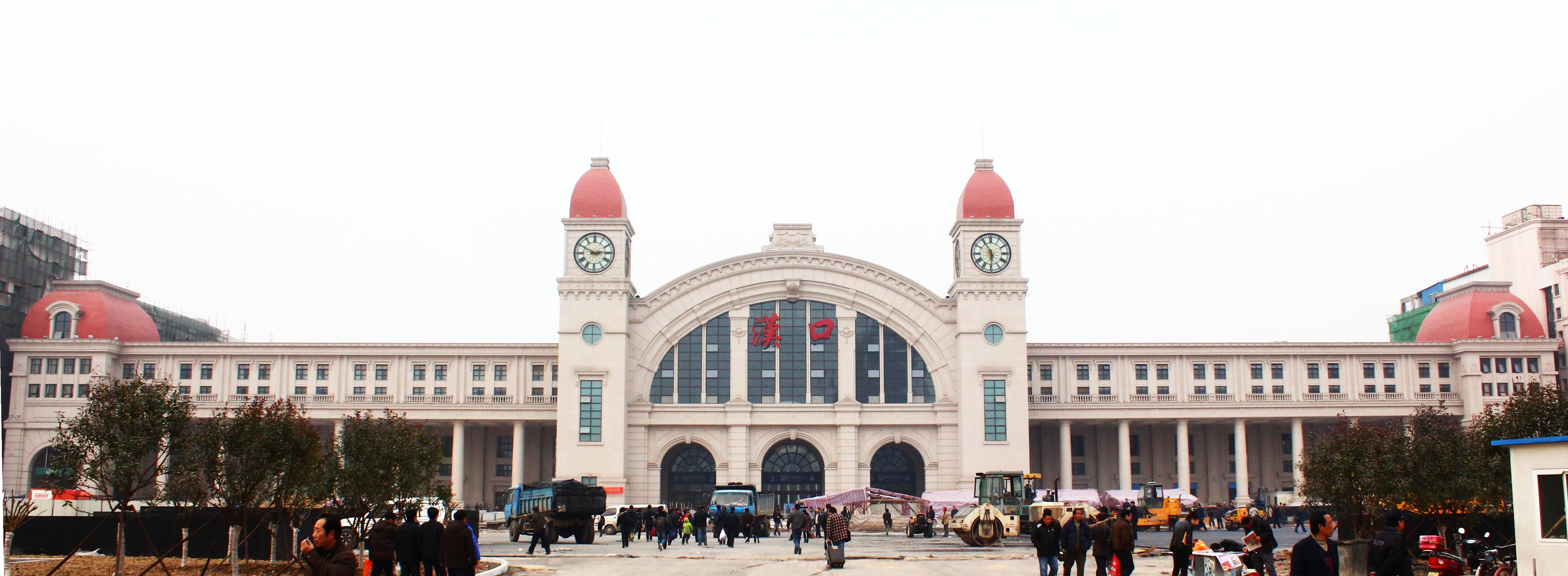
- Hankou railway station

Overview
- Other name(s): Wuhan–Yichang railway Hanyi railway
- Native name: 汉宜铁路 宁蓉线汉宜段
- Status: Operational
- Owner: CR Wuhan
- Locale: Hubei province
- Termini: Hankou; Yichang East
- Stations: 8

Service
- Type: High-speed rail Heavy rail
- System: China Railway High-speed
- Operator: CR Wuhan

History
- Work began: September 17, 2008
- Opened: July 1, 2012

Technical
- Line length: 292 km (181 mi)
- Number of tracks: 2 (Double-track)
- Track gauge: 1,435 mm (4 ft 8 1/2 in) standard gauge
- Electrification: 25 kV 50 Hz AC (Overhead line)
- Operating speed: 200 km/h (120 mph)
- Maximum incline: 0.6%

Wuhan–Yichang railway, or Hanyi railway (simplified Chinese: 汉宜铁路; traditional Chinese: 漢宜鐵路; pinyin: Hàn-Yí Tiělù), is a 291-kilometre (181 mi) long higher-speed railway between Hankou (in Wuhan) and Yichang, in Hubei province, China. The railway forms a section of the Huhanrong passenger-dedicated line from Shanghai to Wuhan to Chengdu. The Hanyi Railway was completed in spring 2012 and started commercial operations on 1 July 2012. Adjacent high-speed rail sections, the Hefei–Wuhan railway to the east and the Yichang−Wanzhou railway to the west, opened respectively in April 2009 and December 2010.

Unlike most other high-speed railways in China which generally follow the route of pre-existing railway lines, the Hanyi railway takes a new, more direct, route between Wuhan and Yichang, bringing rail service for the first time to cities along the Yangtze River in central Hubei such as Hanchuan, Xiantao, and Qianjiang. Jingzhou, previously only served by a branch rail line to Jingmen to the north, now enjoys frequent through-train service to Wuhan and Yichang. The railway is built to National Class I standards and can accommodate freight traffic, including double-stack rail transport.

The Wuhan–Yichang high speed railway, which was opened in 2025, is a faster line rated for 350 kph that parallels the Hanyi Railway as part of the Shanghai–Chongqing–Chengdu high-speed railway.

== Construction history ==
According to a news item from the Wuhan City Government dated July 10, 2008, the plans for the railways were finalized at the time, and the construction was to begin shortly. According to the plans, the construction should have been completed by the end of 2011, however, this deadline was not met. A more recent schedule (confirmed in early May 2012 by Hubei provincial authorities) is for the railway to open in May 2012. It is constructed by the China Railway 12th Bureau Group Co.

On March 1, it was reported that soft earth had been used in the foundation of the railway. Later, the director of Hubei railway construction office reported that a section of the railway had sunk more than the allowed tolerance. On 9 March 2012 it was reported that due to heavy rainfall, a 300 metres (980 ft) section of rail collapsed in central Hubei Province.

== Stations ==
There are eight stations on the line:

- Hankou railway station 汉口站
- Hanchuan railway station 汉川站
- Tianmen South railway station 天门南站
- Xiantao West railway station 仙桃西站
- Qianjiang railway station 潜江站
- Jingzhou railway station 荆州站
- Zhijiang North railway station 枝江北站
- Yichang East railway station 宜昌东站

Even though Tianmen City is west of Xiantao City, Xiantao West railway station (located north of Xiantao's Sanfutan Town) is located west on Tianmen South railway station (located near Tianmen's Duoxiang Town). In fact, Xiantao West is the closest station to downtown Tianmen, and Tianmen South is the closest station to downtown Xiantao. This geographical oddity has resulted because of the way the border between the two county-level cities (which runs mostly along the Hanshui River) is located relative to the new railway's route.

Tianmen South railway station is the station that early plans called "Xiantao railway station".

As of 2012, the Hanyi Railway's trains have never served the Yichang railway station in downtown Yichang. In 2012, that station was closed for renovations; it is expected that after the renovation project is completed, the station will also receive EMU (i.e., D-series) trains, presumably extending the route of Wuhan-Yichang trains by one more station, much closer to downtown Yichang.

== Service ==
As of July 2012, the Hanyi railway is primarily used by frequent high-speed D-series trains circulating between Yichang East and Wuhan's three major rail stations (Hankou, Wuchang, and Wuhan). Some of them continue to the east (to Nanjing and Shanghai Hongqiao), or to the southeast (to Nanchang, over the Wuhan–Jiujiang Railway). A few "conventional" (K, T, Z-series) trains use the line as well.
