= Wuhan–Xiantao intercity railway =

Railway line in Hubei, China

Overview
- Native name: 武仙城际铁路
- Status: Operating
- Locale: Hubei, China
- Stations: 1

History
- Opened: 26 December 2020

Technical
- Number of tracks: 2
- Operating speed: 200 km/h (120 mph)

The Wuhan–Xiantao intercity railway (Chinese: 武仙城际铁路) is a railway line in Hubei, China. The route is 87 kilometres (54 miles), of which 71 kilometres (44 miles) are shared with the Wuhan–Yichang railway. It opened on 26 December 2020 as part of the Wuhan Metropolitan Area intercity railway.

== Services ==
The initial service provision was five trains each way per day between Xiantao and Hankou railway station. In June 2022, two additional trains each way were added and the number of destinations was increased.

== Future expansion ==
There are plans to extend the line to Honghu and Jianli.
