= Wuhan–Xiaogan intercity railway =

Railway line in China

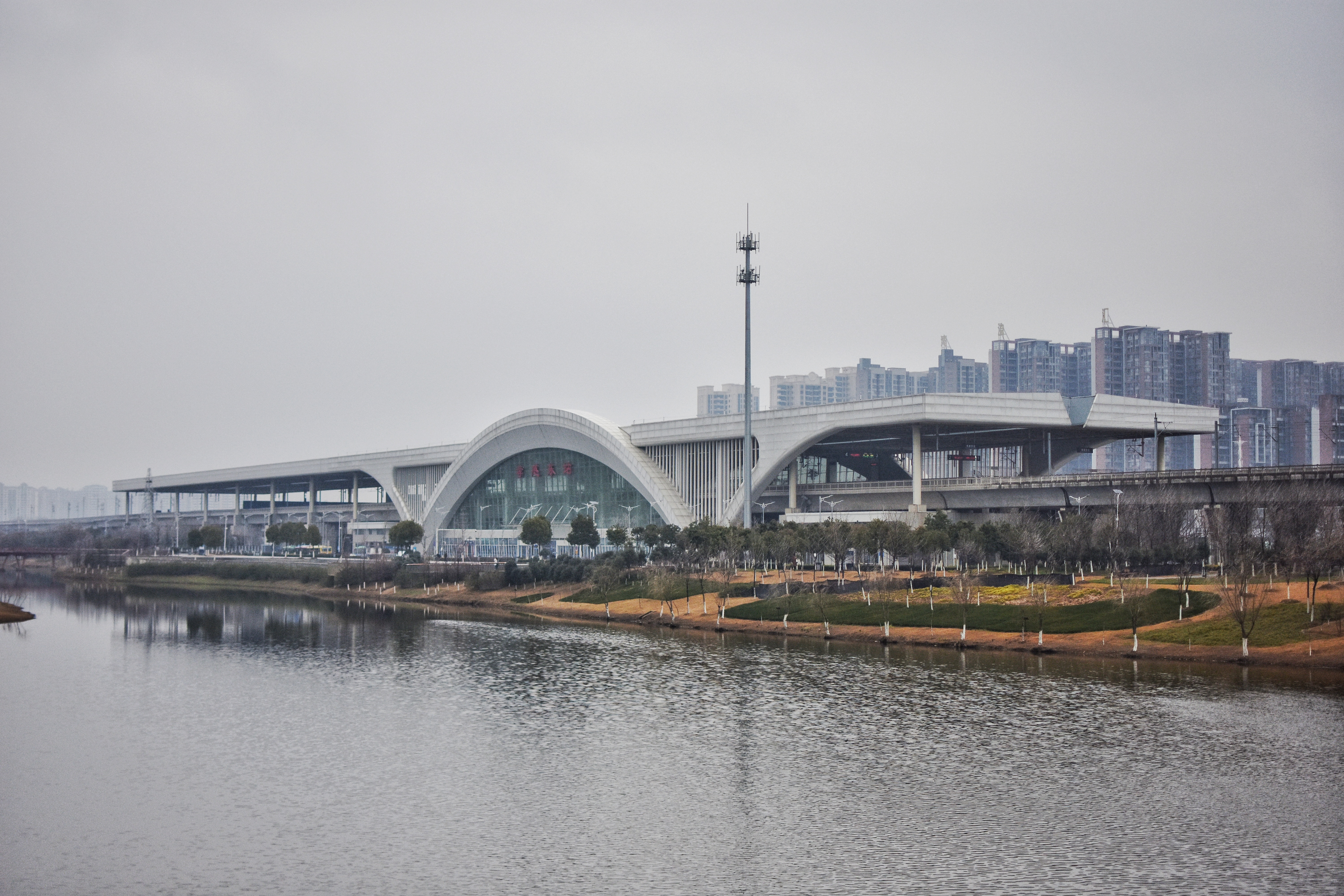
- Xiaogandong Railway Station Exterior

Overview
- Native name: 武孝城际铁路 汉孝城际铁路
- Status: Operational
- Owner: CR Wuhan
- Locale: Hubei province: Wuhan, Xiaogan
- Termini: Hankou; Xiaogandong
- Stations: 11

Service
- Type: High-speed rail
- System: Wuhan Metropolitan Area intercity railway; China Railway High-speed
- Operator(s): CR Wuhan
- Rolling stock: CRH2A

Technical
- Line length: 61.8 km (38.4 mi)
- Number of tracks: 2 (Double-track)
- Electrification: 25 kV 50 Hz AC (Overhead line)
- Operating speed: 200 km/h (120 mph)

The Wuhan–Xiaogan intercity railway (simplified Chinese: 武孝城际铁路; traditional Chinese: 武孝城際鐵路; pinyin: Wǔ-Xiào Chéngjì Tiělù) is an intercity railway connecting Wuhan and Xiaogan. It is a part of Wuhan Metropolitan Area intercity railway. It was opened on December 1, 2016.
