= Hefei–Wuhan railway =

Railway line in China

Hefei–Wuhan railway Hefei-Wuhan section of the Shanghai–Wuhan–Chengdu passenger railway corridor
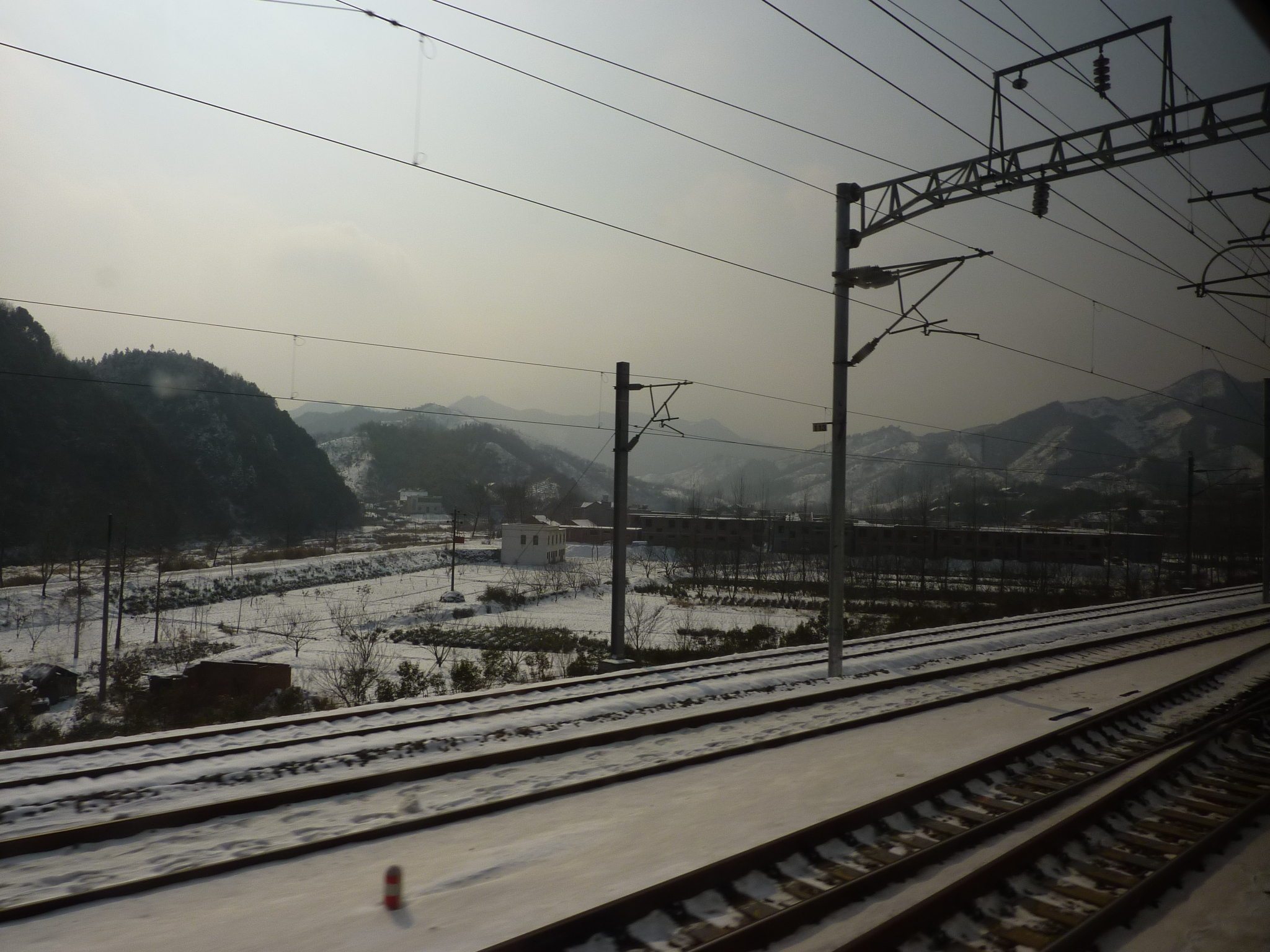
- On the Hewu railway in Jinzhai County, Anhui

Overview
- Other name(s): Hewu line
- Native name: 合武铁路
- Status: Operational
- Owner: CR Shanghai; CR Wuhan
- Locale: Anhui province; Hubei province
- Termini: Hefei; Hankou
- Stations: 13

Service
- Type: High-speed rail Heavy rail
- System: China Railway High-speed
- Operator(s): CR Shanghai; CR Wuhan

History
- Opened: December 31, 2008

Technical
- Line length: 359 km (223 mi)
- Number of tracks: 2 (Double-track)
- Track gauge: 1,435 mm (4 ft 8 1/2 in) standard gauge
- Electrification: 25 kV 50 Hz AC (Overhead line)
- Operating speed: 250 km/h (160 mph)

The Hefei–Wuhan railway (simplified Chinese: 合武铁路; traditional Chinese: 合武鐵路; pinyin: Hé-Wǔ tiělù) is a 250 kilometres per hour (160 mph) high-speed railway in Chinese provinces of Anhui and Hubei, with trains running from Anhui's capital Hefei to Hubei's capital Wuhan. The railway uses tunnels when crossing the Dabie Mountains on the Anhui–Hubei border. The railway opened on 31 December 2008, high-speed services started on April 1, 2009. at 250 km/h (160 mph) and has been used by Shanghai–Nanjing–Hefei–Wuhan express trains since then.

As of July 2010, scheduling systems showed nine daily D-series express trains running in each direction between Hefei and Wuhan's three train stations (Wuhan, Hankou, and Wuchang), making the trip in 2 hours to 2 hrs 40 min. Another six Shanghai-Wuhan D-series trains passed this section without stopping in Hefei. The railway is built to National Class I standards and can accommodate freight, including double-stack rail transport.

This railway is one of the sections of the important east-west route known as the Shanghai–Wuhan–Chengdu High-Speed Railway (Shanghai–Hankou–Chengdu).

The parallel and faster Hefei–Wuhan high-speed railway, which will form part of the Shanghai–Chongqing–Chengdu high-speed railway, has been under construction since 2 January 2024 and is expected to open in 2028.
