= Yichang East railway station =

Railway station in Yichang City, Hubei Province, China

Yichangdong 宜昌东
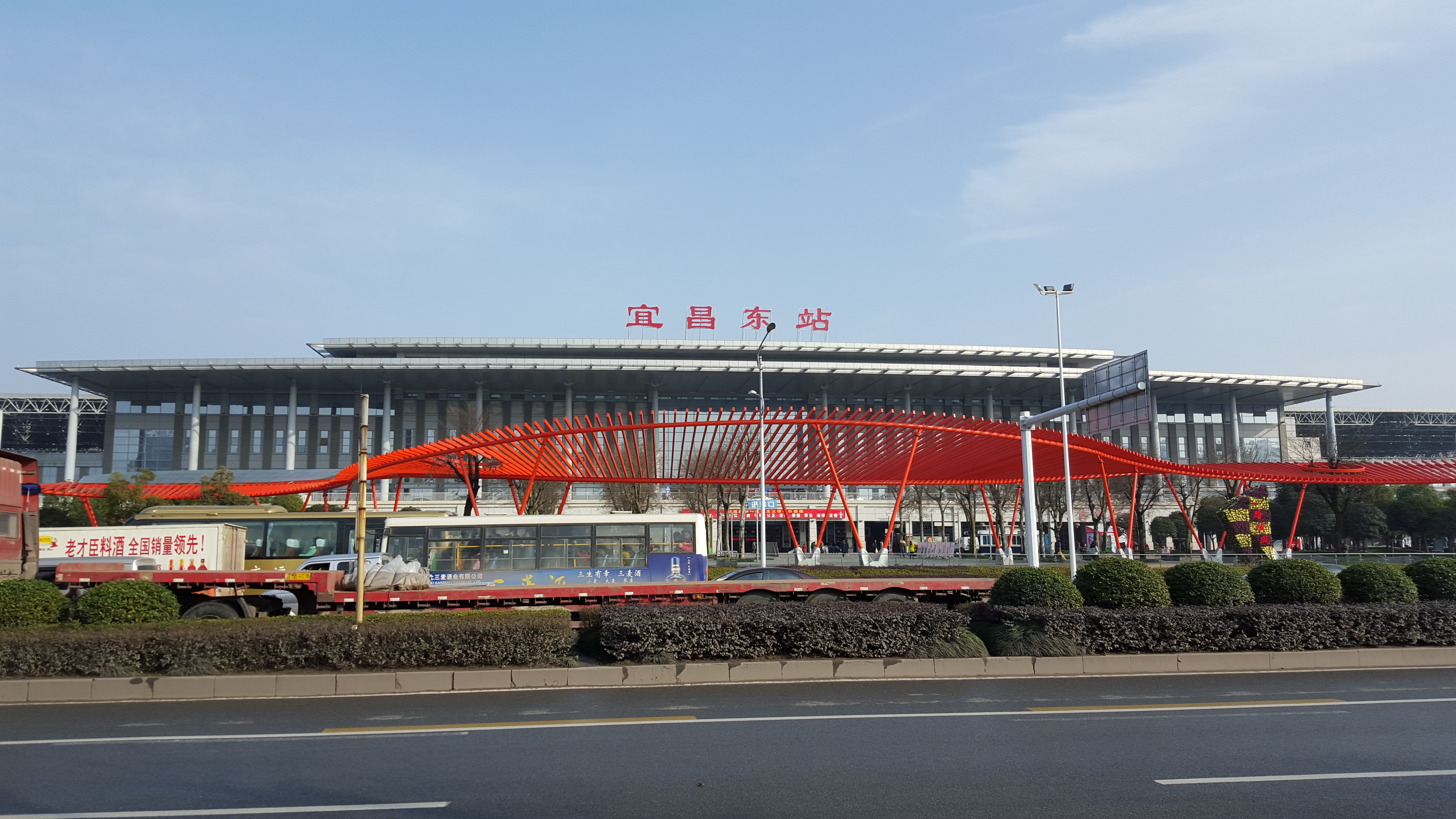

General information
- Other names: Yichang East
- Location: Wujiagang District, Yichang, Hubei; China
- Coordinates: 30°39′45″N 111°21′44″E
- Operator: Wuhan Railway Bureau, China Railway Corporation
- Lines: Hankou–Yichang railway, Yichang–Wanzhou railway
- Platforms: 5
Location

Yichang East railway station (simplified Chinese: 宜昌东站; traditional Chinese: 宜昌東站; pinyin: Yíchāng-dōng Zhàn), formerly Huayan railway station (Chinese: 花艳站), is a railway station in Yichang City, Hubei Province, China. It is the junction of two sections of the Shanghai–Wuhan–Chengdu high-speed railway (Huhanrong): the Hanyi Railway, going east to Hankou (Wuhan), and the Yiwan Railway going west to Lichuan and Wanzhou. The Hanyi Railway is operated by the Wuhan Railway Bureau.

== Service ==
Platforms of Yichang East railway station

As of 2012, Yichang East railway station is the main railway station for the Yichang Metropolitan area. It is the western terminal for the frequent high-speed D-series train service from Yichang to Wuhan and points east (Nanchang, Shanghai). Most of other passenger service originating in Yichang or passing through it uses Yichang East as well.

== History ==
The construction of the station started in January 2005.

Some trains, such as the Yichang-Beijing West service, already started serving Yichang East Station (instead of the older Yichang Station in downtown Yichang) as of December 23, 2010. Construction work, however, continued into 2011.

== Nearby stations ==
The old Yichang railway station, in downtown Yichang. Opened in 1971, it was the main (and only) passenger station in Yichang area until the opening of the Yichang East railway station in 2010. After that, services at Yichang railway station were gradually reduced, and in October 2012 it was closed for reconstruction.

Preceding station	China Railway High-speed	Following station
Zhijiang North towards Hankou	Wuhan–Yichang railway	Terminus
Terminus	Yichang–Wanzhou railway	Yichang South towards Wanzhou
