= Hankou railway station =

Railway station in Wuhan, China

Hankou 汉口
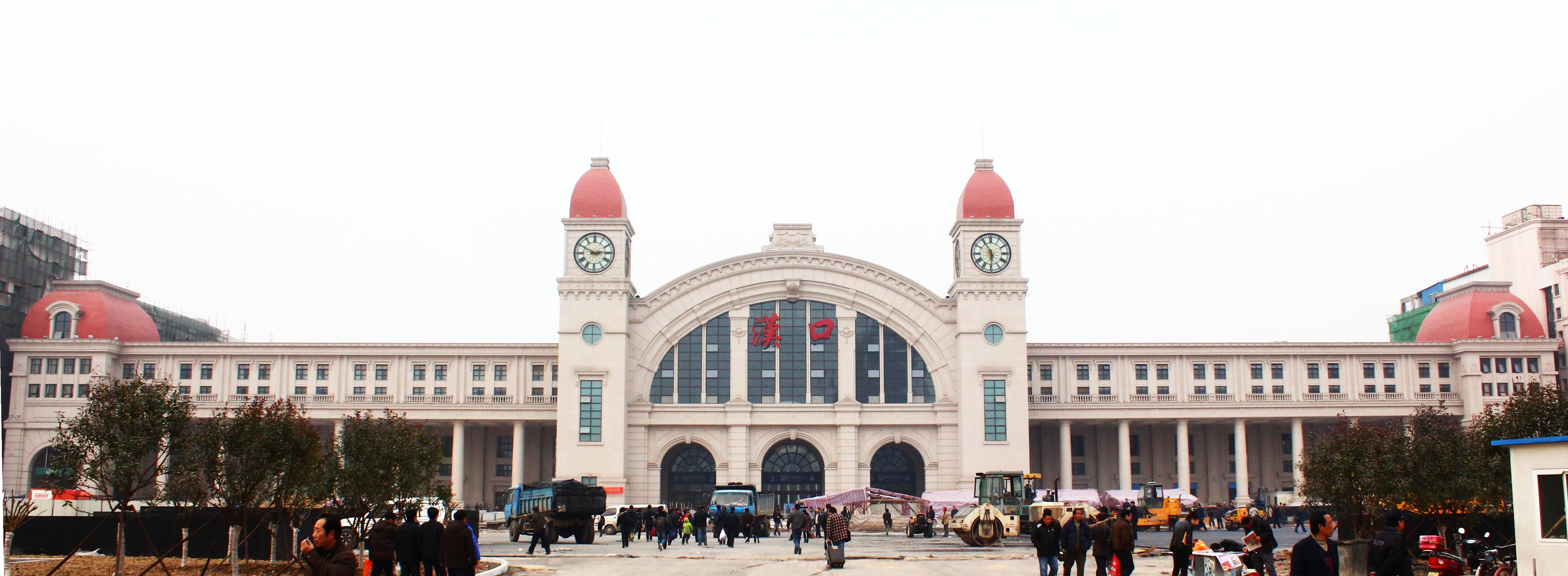
- Hankou railway station

General information
- Location: Jianghan District, Wuhan, Hubei; China
- Coordinates: 30°37′5.11″N 114°15′18″E
- Operator: CR Wuhan
- Lines: China Railway: Hankou–Danjiangkou railway; China Railway High-Speed: Hefei–Wuhan railway; Wuhan–Yichang railway; Wuhan–Xiaogan intercity railway
- Platforms: 13 (6 island platforms, 1 side platform)
- Connections: Hankou Railway Station metro; Bus terminal

Other information
- Station code: 21050 (TMIS code); HKN (telegraph code); HKO (Pinyin code)
- Classification: Top Class station (特等站)

History
- Opened: October 1991
Location
- Location within Hubei Location within China

Hankou railway station (simplified Chinese: 汉口站; traditional Chinese: 漢口站; pinyin: Hànkǒu zhàn) is one of the three main railway stations in the city of Wuhan, the capital of Hubei Province of the People's Republic of China. It is located within the section of the city commonly known as Hankou (i.e., the part of the city north of the Yangtze and Hanshui Rivers), several kilometers north of Hankou's historical center. Hankou Station is served by a station of the same name on Line 2 of Wuhan Metro.

== History ==
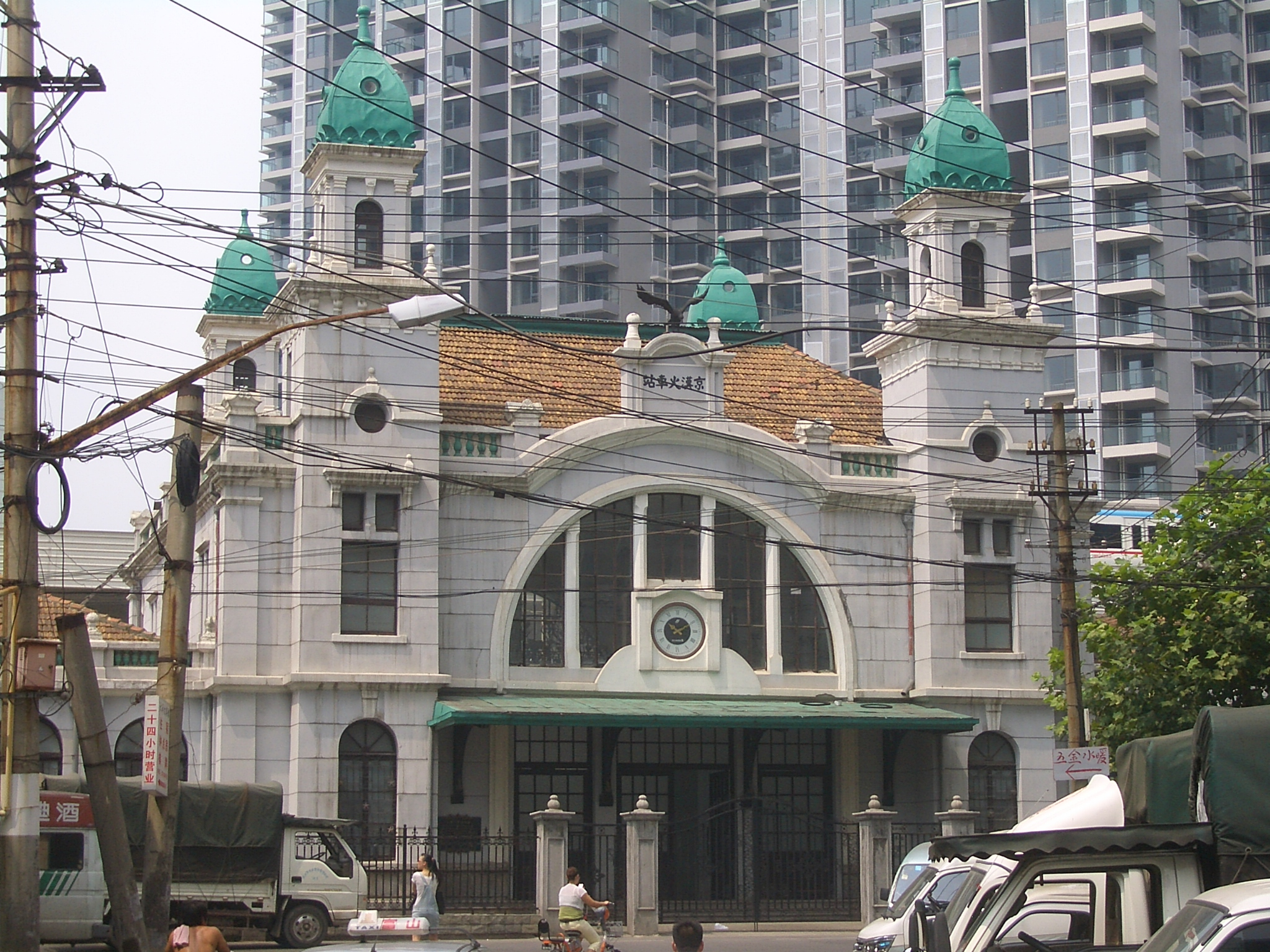
Dazhimen station, built in 1900–1903 and closed in 1991 after the present Hankou station opened

When the Beijing–Hankou railway from Beijing reached Hankou in the early 20th century, its terminus was Dazhimen railway station (大智门火车站), located right outside the walls of the bustling port city of Hankou. In 1991 Dazhimen station was closed, and services were relocated to the present Hankou railway station, located several kilometers north of central Hankou. The current European-style building was completed in 2010.

Hankou railway station became connected to Wuhan Metro on 28 December 2012, with the opening of Line 2 of the city's subway system.

The station's location near the Huanan Seafood Wholesale Market may have contributed to the spread of the Coronavirus disease 2019. On 23 January 2020, the station was closed, along with all other transport infrastructure in the city in the 2020 Wuhan lockdown caused by the outbreak of COVID-19. On 28 March, the station resumed operation for arrivals only; full operation was resumed on 5 April.

== Service ==
Like Wuchang railway station on the southern side of the Yangtze, Hankou station is served by trains going in all directions. After the completion of the high-speed Hefei–Wuhan railway from Hefei in April 2009, the Hankou Station became the main Wuhan terminal for the high-speed trains arriving to the city on this line from Shanghai via Nanjing and Hefei, although as of December 2013 at least three of these trains arrives to the Wuhan railway station instead, and some go to Wuchang.

The Hankou railway station is also Wuhan's station for the Wuhan–Yichang railway, which goes west, to Yichang. Eventually, both the Hefei–Wuhan and the Wuhan–Yichang railway will become sections of the Shanghai–Wuhan–Chengdu High-Speed Railway from Shanghai to Hankou to Chengdu.

== Gallery ==
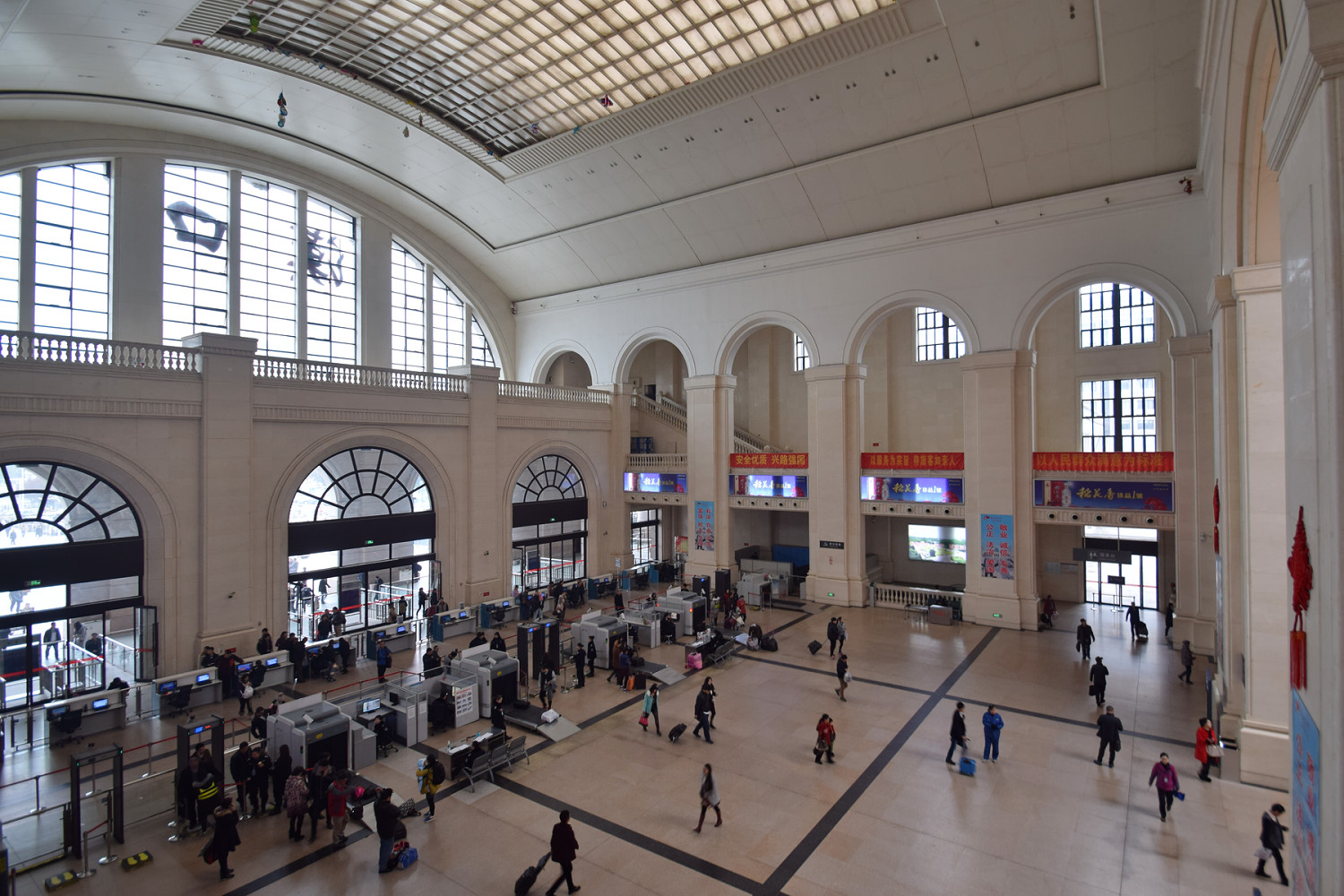
Concourse

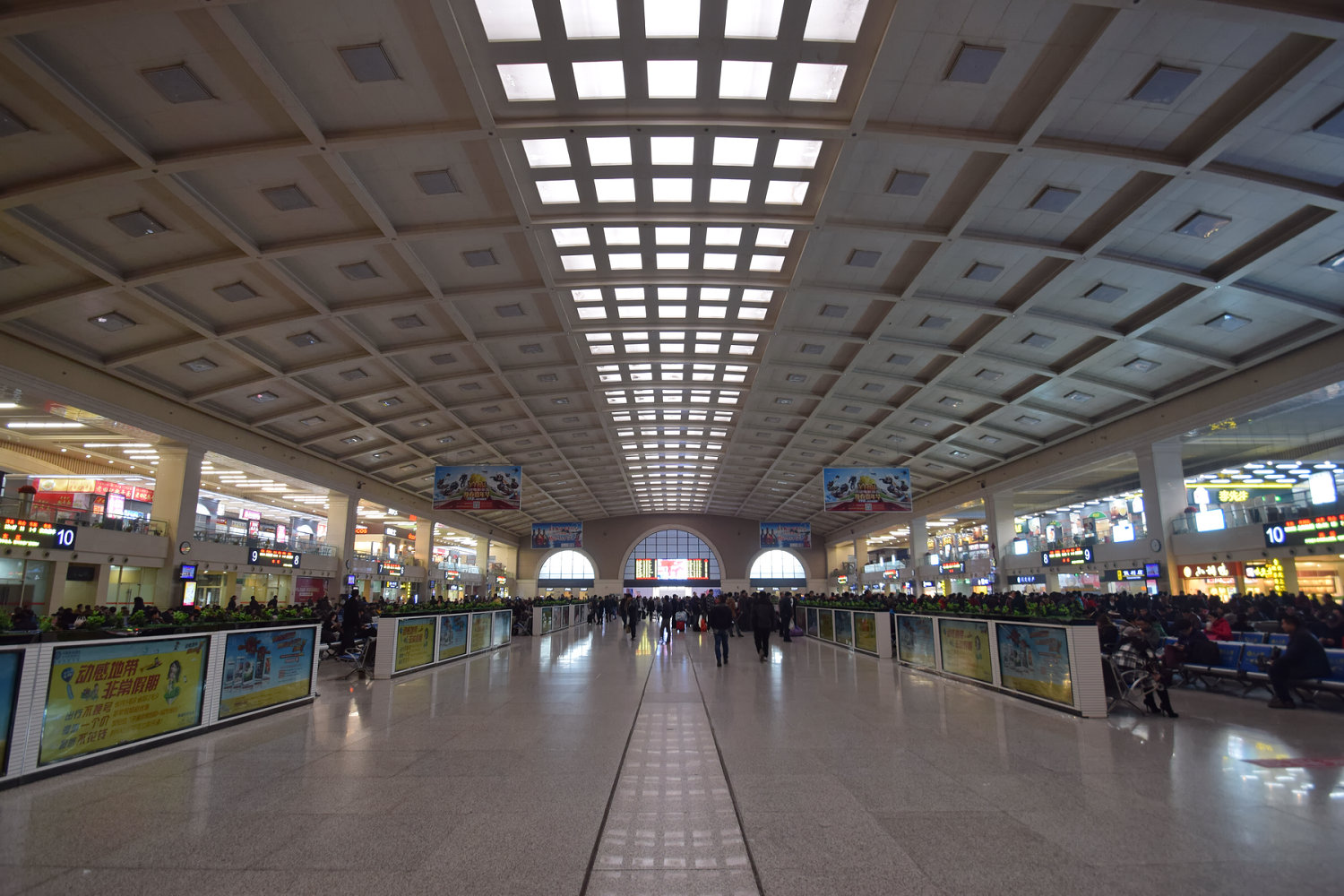
Waiting area

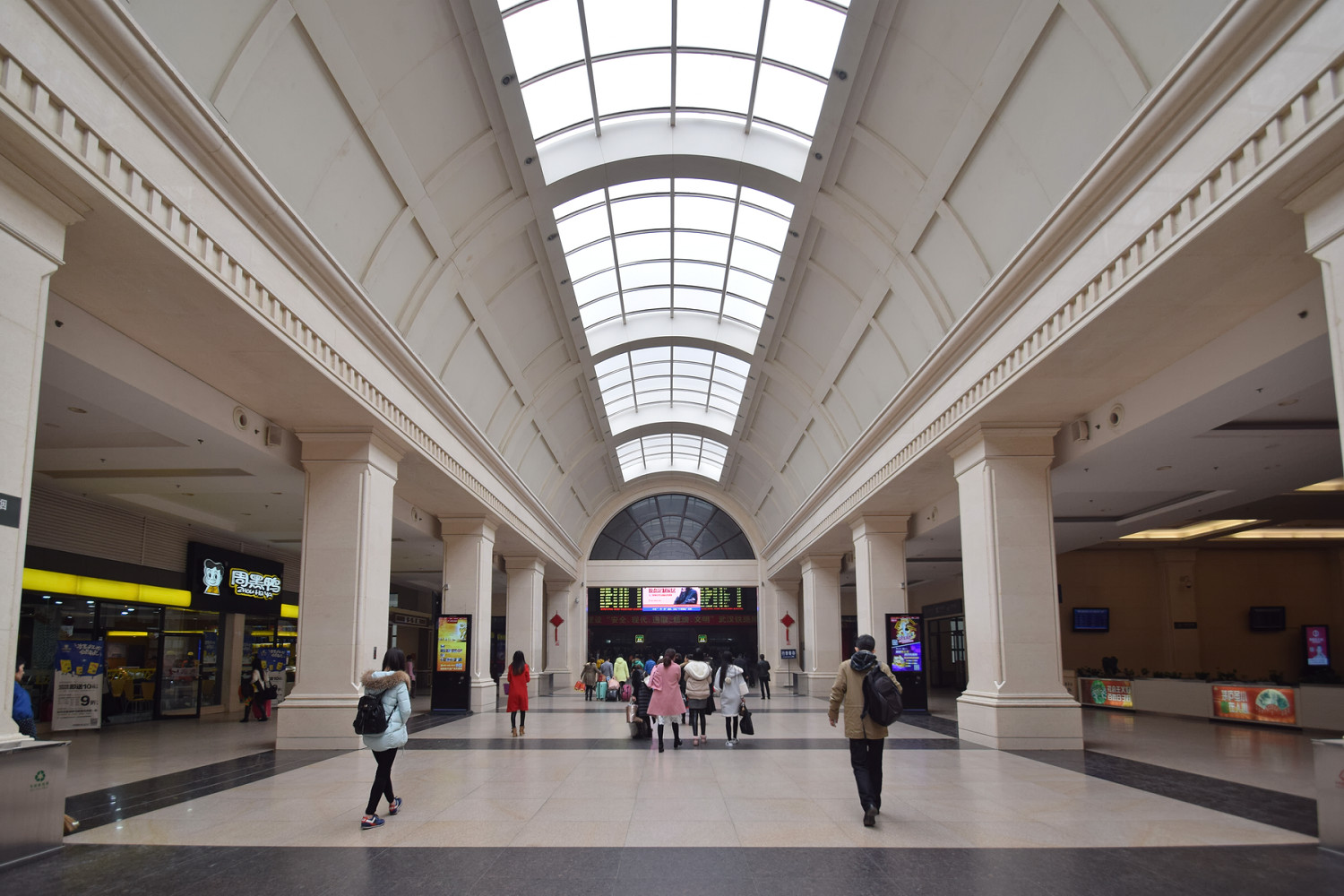
Corridor

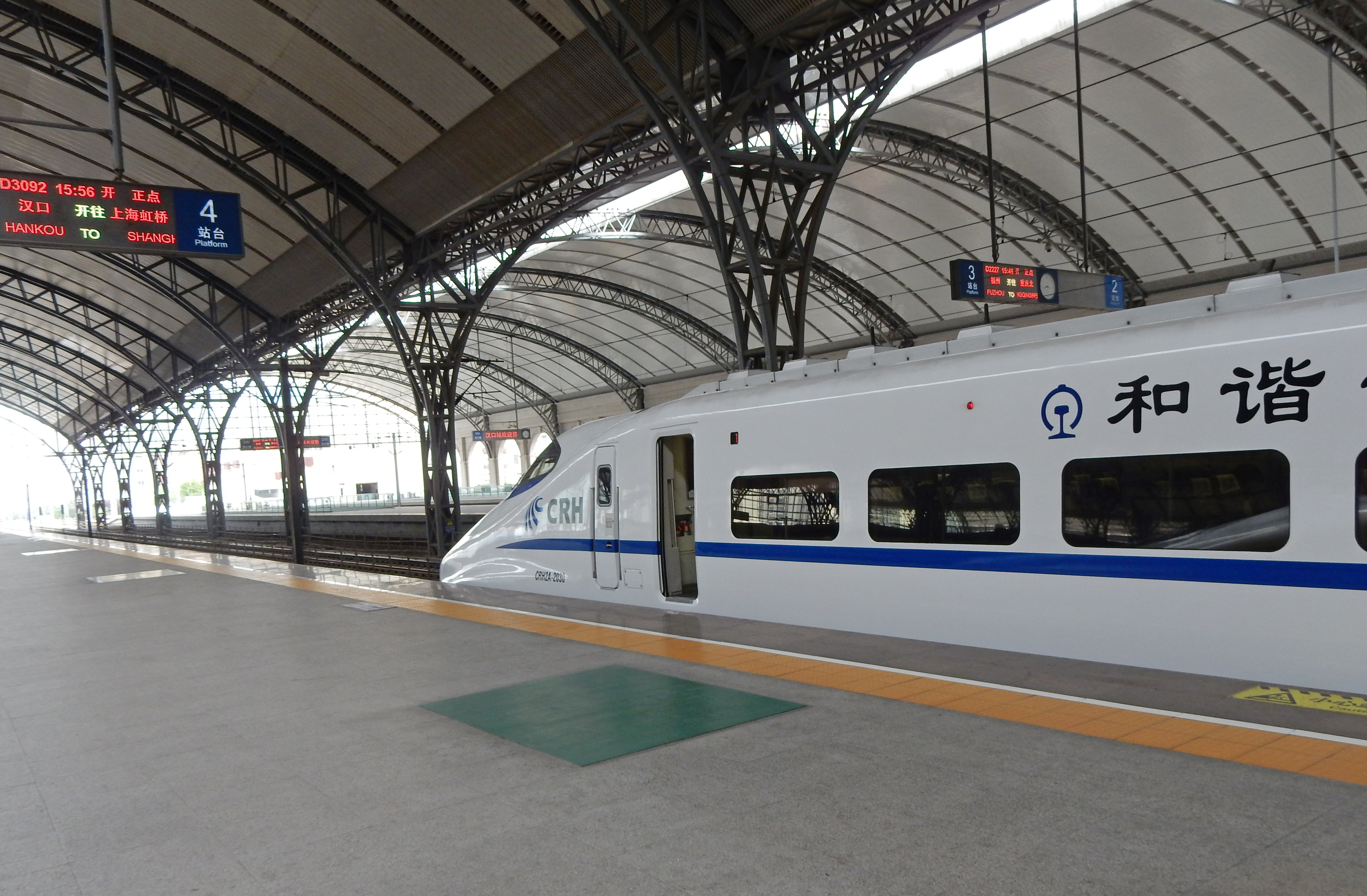
Platform

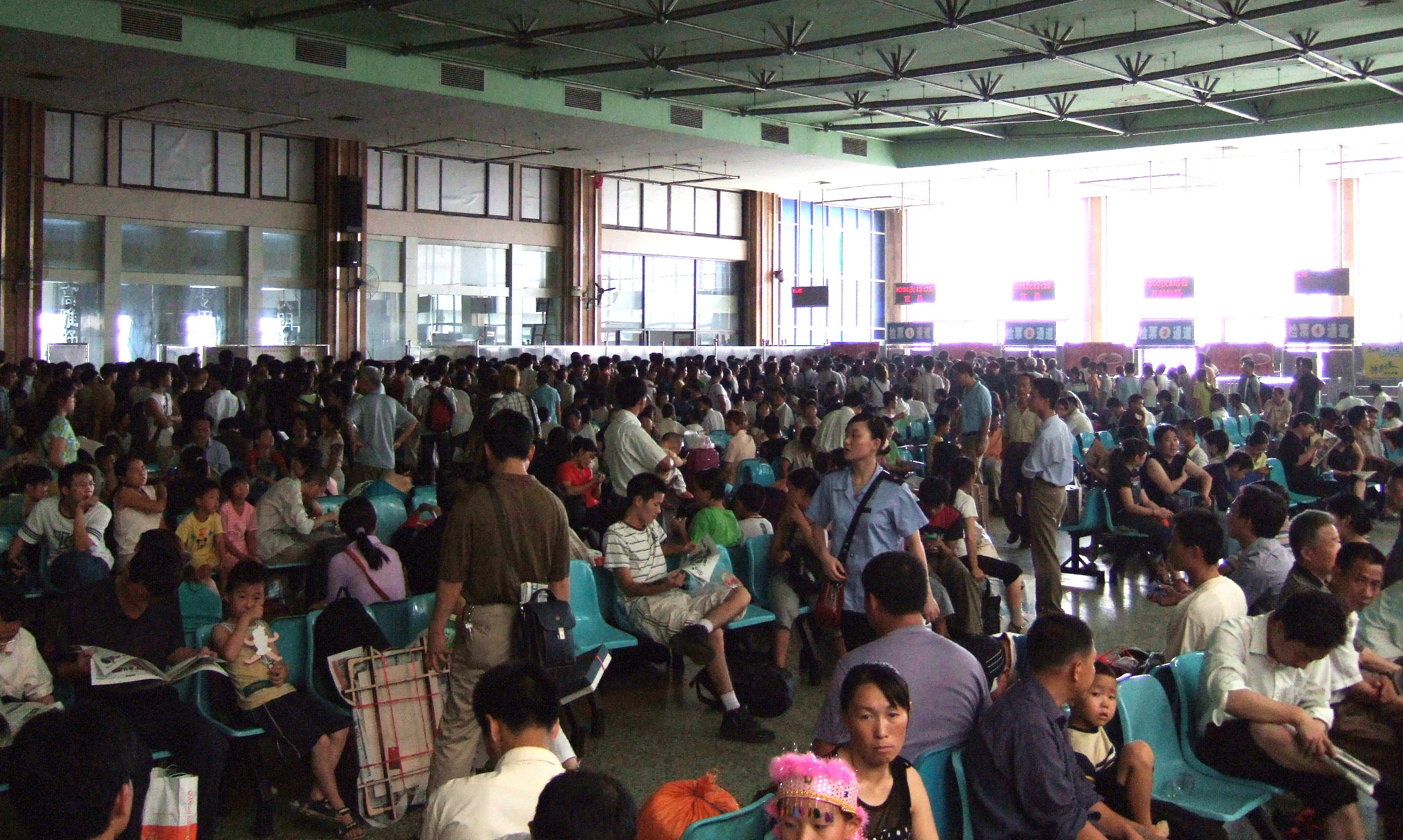
Crowded waiting area, July 2005

== Wuhan Metro ==
Hankou Railway Station 汉口火车站 metro
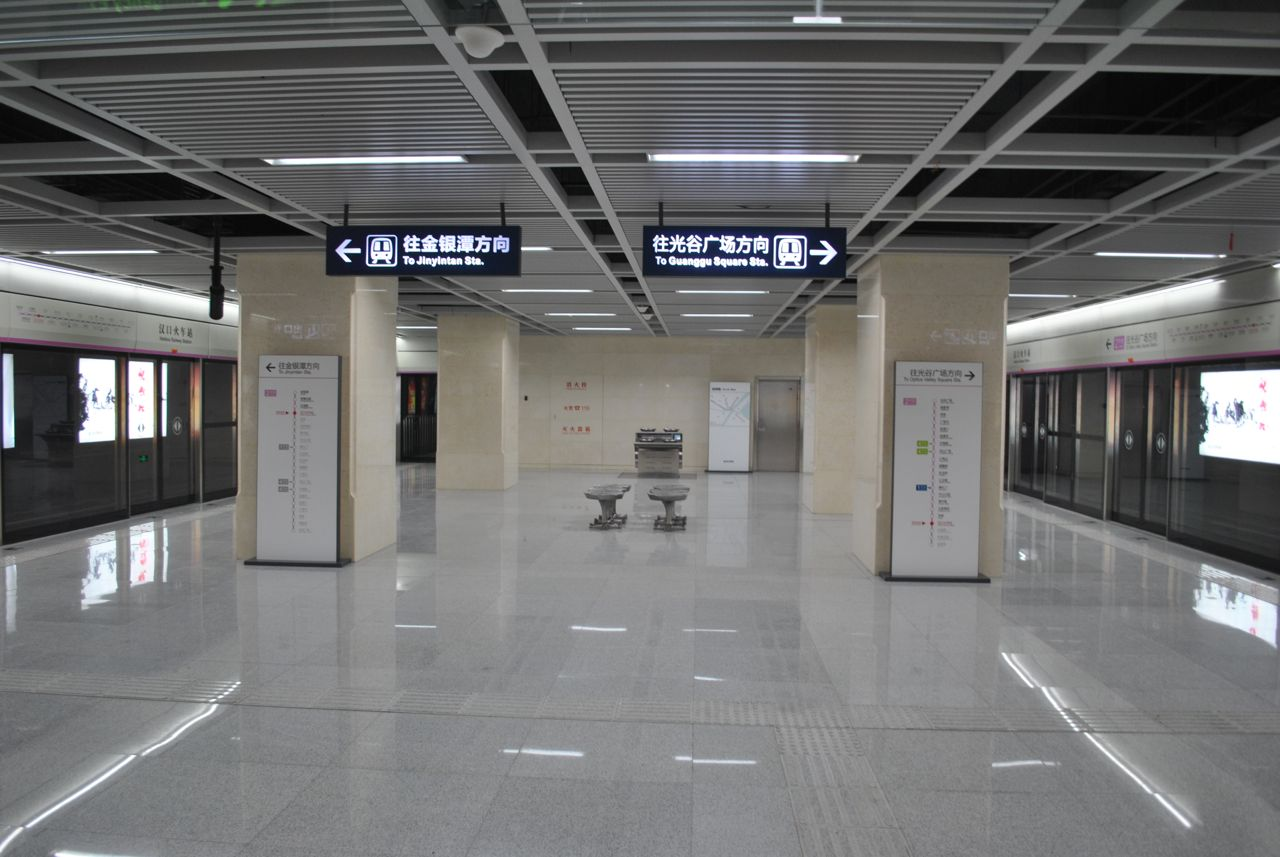
- Platform of the metro station

General information
- Location: Jianghan District, Wuhan, Hubei; China
- Coordinates: 30°37′5.11″N 114°15′18″E
- Line: Line 2
- Platforms: 2 (1 island platform)
- Connections: Hankou railway station; Bus terminal

Construction
- Structure type: Underground

History
- Opened: 28 December 2012 (Line 2)
Location

Hankou Railway Station (Chinese: 汉口火车站) is a station on Line 2 of the Wuhan Metro. It serves the nearby Hankou railway station.

Preceding station	China Railway High-speed	Following station
Hengdian East towards Hefei South	Hefei–Wuhan railway	Terminus
Terminus	Wuhan–Yichang railway	Hanchuan towards Yichang East
Terminus	Wuhan–Xiaogan intercity railway	Houhu towards Xiaogan East
Terminus	Wuhan–Xiantao intercity railway	Hanchuan towards Xiantao
Preceding station	China Railway	Following station
Terminus	Hankou–Danjiangkou railway	Xindun towards Danjiang
Preceding station	Wuhan Metro	Following station
Changgang Road towards Tianhe International Airport	Line 2	Fanhu towards Fozuling
