= China Railway Wuhan Group =

Chinese railway operator

China Railway Wuhan Group Co., Ltd.
- Company type: state-owned enterprise
- Industry: Railway operations
- Predecessor: Wuhan Railway Administration
- Founded: 19 November 2017
- Headquarters: 2 Bayi Road, Wuchang, Wuhan, China
- Area served: Hubei southern Henan
- Owner: Government of China
- Parent: China Railway
- Website: Official Website

China Railway Wuhan Group
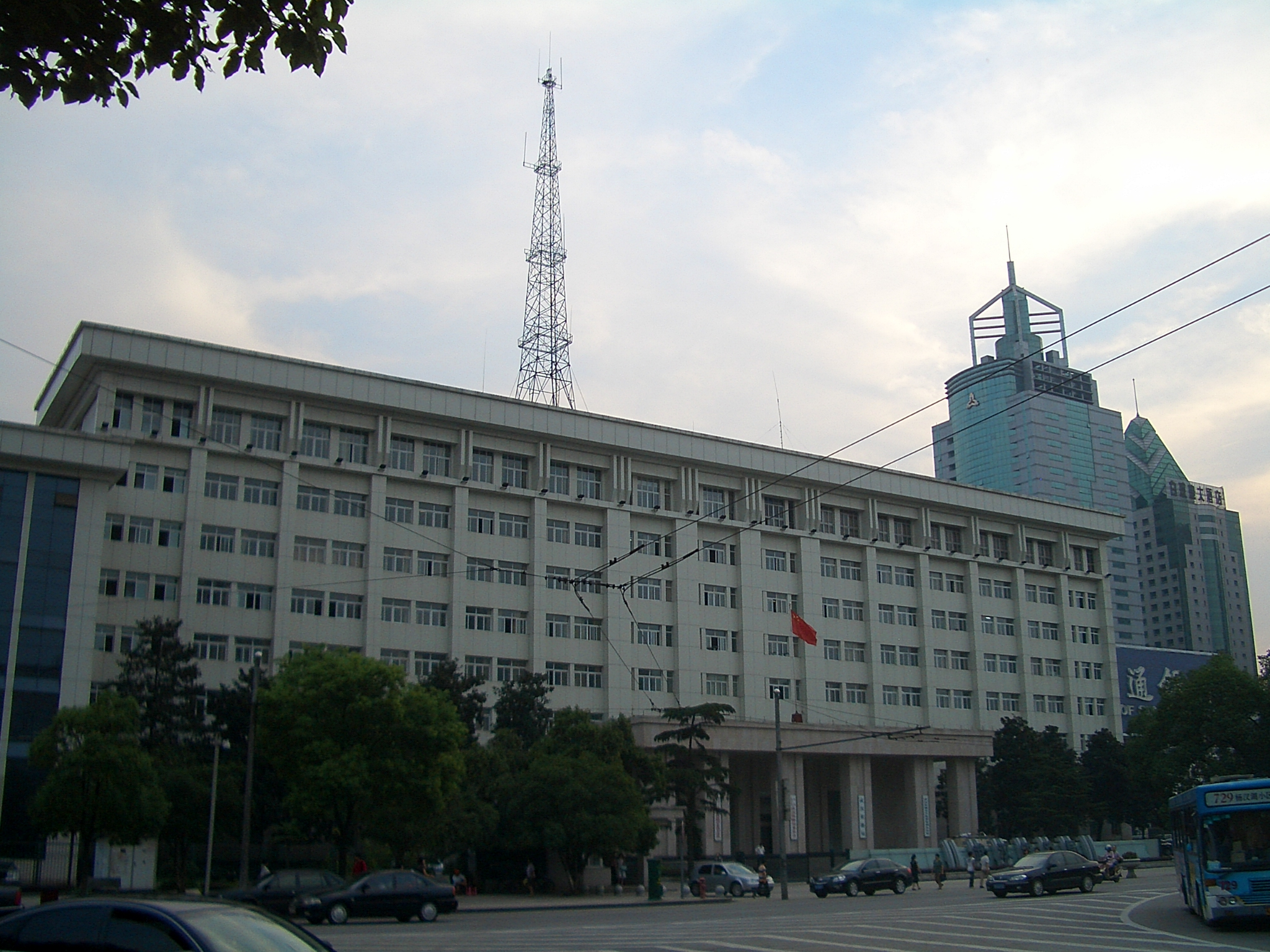
- CR Wuhan in Wuhan near Hongshan Square
- Simplified Chinese: 中国铁路武汉局集团
- Traditional Chinese: 中國鐵路武漢局集團
Transcriptions
Standard Mandarin
- Hanyu Pinyin: Zhōngguó Tiělù Wǔhàn Jú Jítuán

Wuhan Railway Administration
- Simplified Chinese: 武汉铁路局
- Traditional Chinese: 武漢鐵路局
Transcriptions
Standard Mandarin
- Hanyu Pinyin: Wǔhàn Tiělù Jú

CR Wuhan
- Simplified Chinese: 武铁
- Traditional Chinese: 武鐵
Transcriptions
Standard Mandarin
- Hanyu Pinyin: Wǔtiě

A map of Wuhan Railway Hub

China Railway Wuhan Group, officially abbreviated as CR Wuhan or CR-Wuhan, formerly, Wuhan Railway Administration is a subsidiary company operating under the umbrella of the China Railway Group (formerly the Ministry of Railway). The railway administration was reorganized as a company in November 2017.

As of 2007, the group is responsible for a total length of 6390.7 kilometers, and commercial length of 2709.2 kilometers of railways. It oversees 265 stations and manages the railways in Hubei and southern Henan provinces.

It also manages the Wuhan Railway Hub, one of the eight biggest railway hubs, and one of the six biggest passenger hubs in China.

== Hub stations ==
- Wuhan
  - Hankou, Wuchang, Wuhan, Wuhan East
- Xiangyang
  - Xiangyang

== Regional services ==
=== C-train services ===
- Wuxiao
- Wuxian
- Wuhuang
