= Shanghai–Chongqing–Chengdu high-speed railway =

High-speed rail line under construction in China

Shanghai–Chongqing–Chengdu high-speed railway 沪渝蓉高速铁路

Overview
- Status: Under construction
- Locale: Shanghai, Jiangsu, Anhui, Hubei, Chongqing, Sichuan
- Termini: Shanghai Baoshan; Chengdu

Service
- Type: High-speed rail
- Operators: CR Shanghai; CR Wuhan; CR Chengdu

Technical
- Track gauge: 1,435 mm (4 ft 8 1/2 in) standard gauge
- Electrification: 50 Hz 25,000 V
- Operating speed: 350 km/h (217 mph)

Shanghai–Choingqing–Chengdu high-speed railway
- Simplified Chinese: 沪渝蓉高速铁路
- Traditional Chinese: 滬渝蓉高速鐵路
Transcriptions
Standard Mandarin
- Hanyu Pinyin: Hù–Yú–Róng gāosù tiělù

The Shanghai–Chongqing–Chengdu high-speed railway is a high-speed rail line under construction in China. The Chinese name of the railway line, Huyurong, is a combination of the abbreviations for Shanghai (沪, Hù), Chongqing (渝, Yú), and Chengdu (蓉, Róng). It will run in an east–west direction largely parallel to the Yangtze River, connecting the cities of Shanghai, Nanjing, Hefei, Wuhan, Chongqing and Chengdu.

Announced in 2016 as part of China's "Eight Vertical and Eight Horizontal" network, the passage will comprise multiple railway lines and branch lines, including those currently operational as well as those under construction and under planning.

== Route ==
The railway's route is roughly parallel to the existing Shanghai–Wuhan–Chengdu passenger-dedicated railway, but has a maximum speed of 350 km/h (220 mph) rather than the older line's 200 km/h (120 mph) to 250 km/h (160 mph) speeds. The new line would provide a faster connection for the cities of Shanghai, Nanjing, Hefei, Wuhan, Chongqing and Chengdu.

The line includes a number of interconnected routes, including two different main routes between Shanghai and Hefei, a more direct southerly route via Huzhou and a Yangtze north bank route. It also includes a southerly route from Yichang North to Chongqing and a northerly route from Yichang North to Chengdu. Yichang North will also eventually be a junction with the Hohhot–Nanning corridor.

=== Sections ===
Status： already open , Under construction/opening soon , in planning

| Name | Route | Design speed (km/h) | Length (km) | Status | Construction start | Opened | Remarks |
=== Chengdu - Chongqing - Wuhan ===
| Chengdu–Chongqing intercity railway | Chengdu East – Chongqing, Chongqing North | 350 | 307 | open | 22 March 2010 | 26 December 2015 | Connecting to Chongqing North via various lines |
| Chengdu–Chongqing Central line high-speed railway | Chengdu – Chongqing North | 350, reserved 400 | 292 | under construction | 26 September 2021 | Expected in 2027 | The Chengdu–Chongqing section of the Shanghai–Chongqing–Chengdu high-speed railway |
| Zhengzhou–Chongqing high-speed railway | Chongqing North – Wanzhou North (Chongqing–Wanzhou ICR) | 250 | 247 | open | May 2013 | 28 November 2016 | |
| Zhengzhou–Chongqing high-speed railway | Chongqing East – Wanzhou North (Chongqing–Wanzhou HSR) | 350 | 291 | under construction | 9 November 2020 | Expected in 2027 | Also part of the Xi'an–Chongqing high-speed railway |
| Zhengzhou–Chongqing high-speed railway | Wanzhou North – Xingshan – Xiangyang East (Zhengzhou–Wanzhou HSR) | 350 | 429 | open | December 2015 | 20 June 2022 | |
| Chengdu–Wanzhou high-speed railway | Tianfu – Wanzhou North | 350 | 466 | under construction | 24 December 2020 | Expected in 2027 | |
| Yichang–Xingshan high-speed railway | Xingshan – Yichang East | 350 | 109 | open | 28 December 2019 | 28 September 2026 | |
| Chongqing–Yichang high-speed railway | Fuling North – Yichang North | 350 | 434 | under construction | 31 December 2024 | Expected in 2029 | Will connect to Chongqing East and Chongqing North via the Chongqing–Wanzhou high-speed railway |
| Wuhan–Xi'an high-speed railway | Hankou – Xiaogan East | 200 | 62 | open | 22 March 2009 | 1 December 2016 | |
| Wuhan–Xi'an high-speed railway | Xiaogan East – Xiangyang East | 350; 250 (Xiaogan to Yunmeng) | 220 | open | 15 February 2015 | 29 November 2019 | |
| Wuhan–Yichang high-speed railway | Hankou – Yichang North | 350 | 314 | open | 25 September 2021 | 26 December 2025 | Connected to Hankou and Wuhan West by the Wuhan hub through line, connected to Hefei–Wuhan high-speed railway at Lugang |
=== Wuhan - Hefei ===
| Hefei–Wuhan railway | Hefei South – Hankou | 250, reserved 300 | 359 | open | September 2005 | 1 April 2009 | Also part of the Shanghai–Wuhan–Chengdu passenger railway |
| Hefei–Wuhan high-speed railway | Hefei South – Wuhan Tianhe | 350 | 342 | under construction | 2 January 2024 | Expected in 2028 | The main line runs westward at Wuhan Tianhe Station and connects with the Wuhan–Yichang HSR at Lugang line station |
=== Hefei - Shanghai ===
| Hefei–Nanjing railway | Nanjing South – Hefei South | 250 | 156 | open | July 2005 | 18 April 2008 | Also part of the Shanghai–Wuhan–Chengdu passenger-dedicated railway. |
| Shanghai–Nanjing intercity railway | Nanjing – Shanghai & Shanghai Hongqiao | 350 | 301 | open | July 2008 | 1 July 2010 | |
| Shanghai–Nanjing section of the Beijing-Shanghai HSR | Nanjing South – Shanghai Hongqiao | 350 | 301 | open | 18 April 2008 | 30 June 2011 | |
| Shanghai–Nanjing–Hefei high-speed railway | Hefei South – Qidong West | 350 | 554 | under construction | 28 September 2022 | 2027 | |
| Shanghai–Nanjing–Hefei high-speed railway | Qidong West – Shanghai Baoshan | 350 | 554 | under construction | 28 September 2022 | 2029 | |
| Shangqiu–Hangzhou high-speed railway | Hefei South – Huzhou | 350 | 309 | open | 30 November 2015 | 28 June 2020 | |
| Shanghai–Suzhou–Huzhou high-speed railway | Shanghai Hongqiao & Shanghai South – Huzhou | 350 | 163 | open | 5 June 2020 | 26 December 2024 | |

== See also ==
- High-speed rail in China
