= Fusheng railway station =

Railway station in Jiangbei District, Chongqing

Fusheng 复盛
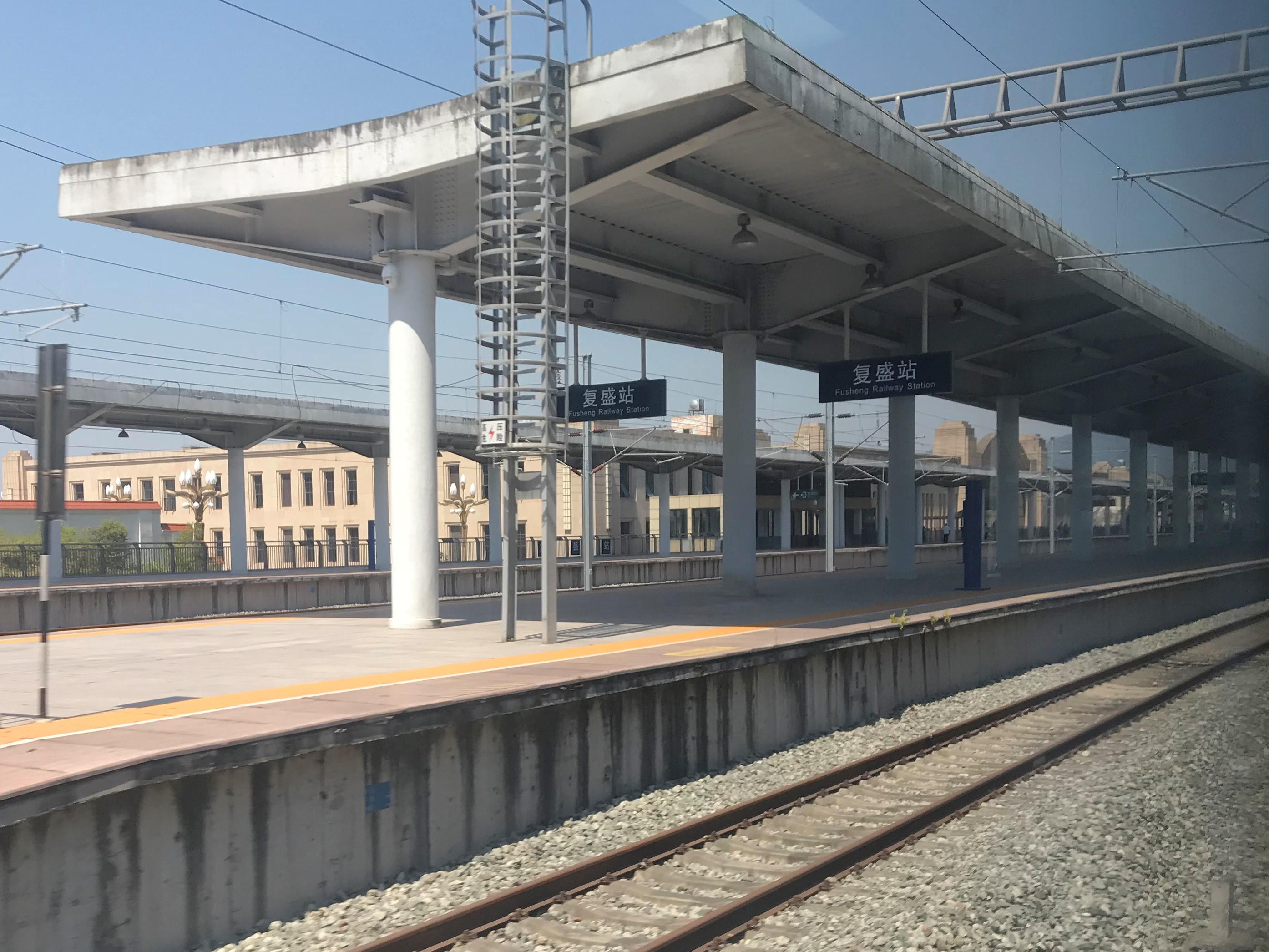

General information
- Location: Liangjiang New Area, Chongqing; China
- Coordinates: 29°39′26.85″N 106°47′55.15″E
- Line: Chongqing–Wanzhou intercity railway
- Connections: Chongqing Rail Transit Line 4

History
- Opened: 20 January 2017; 9 years ago
Location

Fusheng railway station (Chinese: 复盛站; pinyin: Fùshèng zhàn) is a railway station in Liangjiang New Area, Chongqing, China. It opened on 20 January 2017.

== Metro connections ==
The station is served by Chongqing Rail Transit Line 4, and will be served by Line 15 in the future.

Preceding station	China Railway High-speed	Following station
Chongqing North towards Chongqing East	Chongqing–Wanzhou high-speed railway	Changshou North towards Wanzhou North
Chongqing North Terminus	Chongqing–Lichuan railway	Changshou North towards Lichuan
Preceding station	Chongqing Rail Transit	Following station
Shiheqing towards Shimahelijiao	Line 4	Sanbanxi towards Huangling
