= Zhengzhou–Chongqing high-speed railway =

Railway line in China

Zhengzhou–Chongqing high-speed railway Chinese: 郑渝高速铁路; pinyin: Zhèng yú gāosù tiělù

Overview
- Status: Operational (Zhengzhou-Xiangyang section)
- Owner: China Railway
- Locale: Henan, Hubei, Chongqing
- Termini: Zhengzhou East; Chongqing North
- Stations: 28

Service
- Operator(s): CR Zhengzhou Group, CR Wuhan Group, CR Chengdu Group

History
- Opened: 28 November 2016 (Chongqing North–Wanzhou North); 1 December 2019 (Zhengzhou East–Xiangyang East); 20 June 2022 (Xiangyang East–Wanzhou North)

Technical
- Line length: 1,065.7 km (662.2 mi)
- Num of tracks: 2
- Track gauge: 1,435 mm (4 ft 8 1/2 in)
- Minimum radius: 7,000 m (23,000 ft) (normal); 5,500 m (18,000 ft) (difficult)
- Electrification: 25 kV 50 Hz AC (overhead line)
- Operating speed: 350 kilometres per hour (220 mph) (design speed); 310 kilometres per hour (190 mph) (ATP speed limit); 300 kilometres per hour (190 mph) (Zhengzhou Hangkonggang – Chongqing East); 250 kilometres per hour (160 mph) (Zhengzhou East – Zhengzhou Hangkonggang and Wanzhou North – Chongqing North)
- Maximum incline: 2.0% (normal); 3.0% (difficult)

The Zhengzhou–Chongqing high-speed railway or Zhengyu high-speed railway (Chinese: 郑渝高速铁路; pinyin: Zhèng yú gāosù tiělù) is a high-speed railway in mainland China connecting Zhengzhou, Henan province, and Chongqing. The entire line opened to traffic on 20 June 2022. It was originally constructed as a combination of the Zhengzhou–Wanzhou high-speed railway and the Chongqing–Wanzhou intercity railway. It will include a branch being built as the Chongqing–Wanzhou high-speed railway, expected to open in 2027.

In China's "Eight Vertical and Eight Horizontal" high-speed railway network, the Zhengzhou–Xiangyang section belongs to the Hohhot–Nanning corridor, while the Xiangyang–Chongqing section belongs to the Yangtze River high-speed railway corridor.

== Introduction ==
The Zhengzhou–Chongqing high-speed railway was listed as a key railway construction project in the 12th Five-Year Plan (2011–2015). The line is 1,065.7 km (662.2 mi)-long (the Chongqing–Wanzhou section is calculated based on the northern route of the Chongqing–Wanzhou intercity railway; if calculated based on the southern route of the Chongqing–Wanzhou high-speed railway, it is 1,109.4 km (689.3 mi)-long). It is being constructed in three sections: the Chongqing–Wanzhou ICR from Chongqing's main urban area to Wanzhou, the Chongqing–Wanzhou HSR, and the Zhengzhou–Wanzhou high-speed railway from Zhengzhou to Wanzhou.

The designed speed is 250 km/h (160 mph) from Zhengzhou East station to Zhengzhou Hangkonggang (Zhengzhou Airport) station, and 350 km/h (220 mph) from Zhengzhou Hangkonggang to Wanzhou North station. Along the northern route of the Chongqing–Wanzhou ICR, the designed speed from Wanzhou North station to Chongqing North station is 250 km/h (160 mph); along the southern route of the Chongqing–Wanzhou HSR, the design speed from Wanzhou North station to Chongqing East station is 350 km/h (220 mph). The line passes through Zhengzhou, Kaifeng, Xuchang, Pingdingshan, Nanyang, Xiangyang, Shennongjia Forestry District, Yichang, Enshi Tujia and Miao Autonomous Prefecture, and Chongqing, with an estimated cost of ¥ 160 billion.

After the entire line is completed, it will end the history of no railway access in the Three Gorges Reservoir area (Yunyang, Fengjie, and Wushan). The fastest travel time from Chongqing to Zhengzhou and Beijing will be only 4.5 hours and 7 hours, respectively.

== History ==
The Zhengzhou–Wanzhou HSR, the northern section of the Zhengzhou–Chongqing HSR, began construction in May 2013 and was completed and opened to traffic on 28 November 2016.

On 31 October 2015, the Henan section of the Zhengzhou–Wanzhou HSR started construction. On 26 December, the Chongqing section of the Zhengzhou–Wanzhou HSR started construction. The Zhengzhou East to Xiangyang East section opened to traffic on 1 December 2019.

The Wanzhou North to Wushan section and the Xiangyang East to Badong section entered the joint commissioning and testing phase on 28 January 2022 and 28 February 2022, respectively. On 12 April 2022, the Badong to Wanzhou section successfully achieved a single-train speed of 403 km/h (250 mph) in the tunnel and a relative passing speed of 806 km/h (501 mph), setting a world record for the passing speed of high-speed trains in tunnels. On 14 April, the Xiangyang East to Wanzhou North section of the Zhengzhou–Chongqing HSR began full-line connection testing; on 22 April, the Wanzhou North to Wushan section entered the operation testing phase.

The entire line was completed and opened to traffic on 20 June 2022. The Chongqing–Wanzhou HSR started construction in 2022 and is scheduled to be completed and opened to traffic in 2027.
