= Yichang–Xingshan high-speed railway =

Railway line in Hubei, China

Yichang–Xingshan high-speed railway 宜昌至郑万高铁联络线

Overview
- Other name: Yixing high-speed railway
- Status: In operation
- Locale: Hubei, China
- Termini: Yichang East; Xingshan

Service
- Type: High-speed rail
- System: China Railway
- Operator: CR Wuhan Group

History
- Opened: 28 September 2026; 35 days ago

Technical
- Line length: 109.38 km (67.97 mi)
- Track gauge: 1,435 mm (4 ft 8 1/2 in) standard gauge
- Minimum radius: 7,000 m (23,000 ft) (general); 5,500 m (18,000 ft) (difficult)
- Electrification: 25 kV AC
- Operating speed: 350 km/h (220 mph)
- Signalling: Automatic block
- Maximum incline: 2% (general); 3% (difficult)

The Yichang–Xingshan high-speed railway, also referred to in Chinese under the acronym Yichang-Zhengwan high-speed railway connection line (Chinese: 宜昌至郑万高铁联络线; pinyin: Yíchāng zhì zhèng wàn gāotiě liánluò xiàn), is a high-speed railway between Yichang on the Wuhan–Yichang railway and Xingshan on the Zhengzhou–Chongqing high-speed railway in Hubei province, China. It forms part of the Shanghai–Chongqing–Chengdu high-speed railway. The total length of the line is 109.38 km (67.97 mi), and there are 3 stations on the whole line. It is built parallel to the Yichang–Wanzhou railway, opened in 2010 as part of the Shanghai–Wuhan–Chengdu passenger railway. It connects the Wuhan–Yichang railway to the east and the Zhengzhou–Chongqing HSR to the west.

The line runs from Yichang East station via the Changgangling area and Xiabaoping station to Xingshan station. In addition, this line connects with Yichang North station and the Chongqing–Yichang high-speed railway. The estimated total investment of the project is 18.15 billion yuan, the construction period is 5.5 years, the design speed is 350 km/h (220 mph), and 94.37% of the main line will run on bridge or through tunnel. It was officially completed and opened to traffic in September 2026. With the completion of the line, combined with the Zhengzhou-Wanzhou HSR to form a new east–west high-speed railway route in the Sichuan-Chongqing area, the Wuhan–Chongqing route was shortened from the previous fastest service of 5 hours and 54 minutes to about 3 hours, and Wuhan–Chengdu services take only about 5 hours. At the same time, journeys between Yichang and Beijing were shortened from the previous 8 hours to about 4.5 hours.

== History ==
The environmental impact assessment was announced for the first time on 5 September 2018. On 18 April 2019, the feasibility study report of the Yichang-Zhengwan high-speed railway connection line was jointly approved by China Railway and the Government of Hubei Province. On 28 December, the project officially started construction in Beidouping, Xingshan County, in the Three Gorges Reservoir Area.

On 13 August 2021, the pouring of the first beam along the entire line began. On 7 December 2022, the highest pier of China's highest high-speed railway bridge, the 124 m (407 ft) high pier No. 13 of the Gaolan River bridge, was capped.

On 13 September 2024, according to a notice from China Railway Corporation, the line was renamed Yichang–Xingshan high-speed railway, abbreviated as Yixing high-speed railway.

On 26 November 2024, the Changgangling Tunnel was completed. On 2 April 2025, the Weijiashan Extra-long Tunnel, a key control project of the line, was completed. On 19 April, the Gaolanhe Extra-large Bridge, a key and difficult project of the Yichang–Xingshan HSR, was closed. On 21 January 2026, the Xingshan East Tunnel was completed, marking the completion of the main bridge and tunnel works of the line.

On 9 May 2026, the line entered the static acceptance stage. On 18 August, the line entered testing. On 28 September, the line was officially opened for operation.
