= Chongqing–Wanzhou high-speed railway =

Planned railway line in China

Chongqing–Wanzhou High-speed railway 渝万高速铁路

Overview
- Status: Planned
- Locale: Chongqing
- Termini: Chongqing East; Wanzhou North
- Stations: 5

Service
- Type: High-speed rail
- Operator: China Railway Chengdu Group

Technical
- Line length: 291.3 km (181 mi)
- Track gauge: 1,435 mm (4 ft 8 1/2 in) standard gauge
- Operating speed: 350 km/h (217 mph)

Chongqing–Wanzhou high-speed railway is the second route between Chongqing and Wanzhou after the Chongqing–Wanzhou intercity railway. It forms part of the Zhengzhou–Chongqing high-speed railway and the Yangtze River high-speed railway corridor of China's "Eight Vertical and Eight Horizontal network." The Chongqing–Wanzhou high-speed railway, on a faster 350 kilometres per hour (220 mph) alignment, is expected to open in 2025. It will take a different route, heading south to serve Zhongxian and Fengdu with new railway stations and interchanging with the existing Fuling North railway station and terminating at Chongqing East.

On 2 July 2018, initial plans for the railway, with seven stations, were unveiled. Geological surveys began in 2020. The plans have been revised and the line will now have five stations. It is expected to be completed by 2025.

== Stations ==
Station Name	Chinese	Metro transfers/connections
Chongqing East	重庆东	6 24 27
Fuling North	涪陵北	
Fengdu North	丰都北	
Zhongxian	忠县	
Wanzhou North	万州北	
