= Chongqing–Yichang high-speed railway =

Railway line in China

Chongqing–Yichang high-speed railway Chinese: 渝宜高速铁路; pinyin: Yú yí gāosù tiělù

Overview
- Status: Under construction
- Owner: China Railway
- Locale: Hubei, Chongqing
- Termini: Yichang North; Changshou North
- Stations: 10

Service
- Operator(s): CR Chengdu Group, CR Wuhan Group

Technical
- Line length: 441.4 km (274.3 mi)
- Num of tracks: 2
- Track gauge: 1,435 mm (4 ft 8 1/2 in)
- Minimum radius: 7,000 m (23,000 ft) (normal); 5,500 m (18,000 ft) (difficult)
- Electrification: 25 kV 50 Hz AC (overhead line)
- Operating speed: 350 kilometres per hour (220 mph) (design speed)
- Maximum incline: 2.0% (normal); 3.0% (difficult)

The Chongqing–Yichang high-speed railway or Yuyi high-speed railway (Chinese: 渝宜高速铁路; pinyin: Yú yí gāosù tiělù), also known as the Yichang–Fuling section of the Shanghai–Chongqing–Chengdu high-speed railway or the Yichang–Fuling section of the Yangtze River high-speed railway, is a high-speed railway under construction, located in Hubei Province and the Chongqing Municipality of China. The project aims to improve the regional road network, enhance the comprehensive transportation system, and assist the Wuling Mountains contiguous poverty-stricken area in poverty alleviation.

== Planning Overview ==
The Chongqing–Yichang high-speed railway starts from Yichang North station in the east, passes through Changyang, Wufeng, Hefeng, Enshi, Lichuan, Shizhu and Fengdu in the west, and ends at Fuling North station. The newly built main line is 441.1 km (274.1 mi)-long. Preliminary work has been carried out on the Fuling North to Changshou North section. The Changshou North to Chongqing North section is planned to use the Chongqing–Wanzhou ICR in the short term. The Chongqing North to Changshou North section is planned to be built in the long term via Chongqing Airport. In April 2022, the feasibility study report of the Chongqing North to Changshou North section was completed. The Chongqing North to Changshou North project is 71.6 km (44.5 mi)-long.

The entire line is planned to have 10 stations, including Yichang North, Yichang East, Changyang, Wufeng West, Hefeng, Enshi South, Lichuan South, Shizhu North, Fengdu, and Fuling North. Due to the complex geology along the line, this section is the most difficult section to construct for the Shanghai–Chongqing–Chengdu high-speed railway. Before the Chongqing–Yichang section is completed and opened to traffic, the route from Shanghai to Sichuan and Chongqing will have to use the Zhengzhou–Chongqing HSR and the Chengdu–Dazhou–Wanzhou HSR. After completion, the operating mileage from Chengdu and Chongqing to Shanghai will be shortened to 1,898 km (1,179 mi) and 1,594 km (990 mi) respectively, and the travel time from Chongqing to Shanghai will be further reduced to 5.3 hours.

== Construction plan ==
On 17 July 2018, the Leading Group for Promoting the Development of the Yangtze River Economic Belt issued the "Implementation Plan for Promoting the Construction of the Yangtze River Economic Belt High-speed Railway Corridor", which formally planned the high-speed railway corridor along the Yangtze River. The Chongqing–Yichang HSR was included as a key section in the "Eight Vertical and Eight Horizontal" main corridors, which is the third stage goal of the "three-step" plan for the construction of the Yangtze River corridor. On 7 April 2020, the China State Railway Group Co., Ltd. issued a tender for the survey and design of the new line, and the preliminary research work for the project was officially launched. On 20 December, the Yangtze River Railway Group Co., Ltd., which is responsible for promoting the construction of the Yangtze River corridor and managing the relevant lines, was established in Wuhan.

On 25 March 2021, China State Railway Group Co., Ltd. held a pre-feasibility study review meeting for the Yichang–Fuling line in Yichang. On 19 October 2022, the consultation opinion on the social stability risk assessment of the Wufeng (exclusive) to Enshi South (inclusive) section of the line was released. On 17 October 2023, the environmental impact assessment information for the line was made public for the first time. On 29 December, a mobilisation meeting was held for the commencement of construction of the line. The feasibility study for the line was approved within the year.

Construction began on the Yichang–Fuling HSR on 31 December 2024.
