= CTGU =

CTGU may refer to:

- Chongqing Three Gorges University
- China Three Gorges University
