= Zhengzhou–Wanzhou high-speed railway =

Railway line in China

Zhengzhou–Wanzhou high-speed railway 郑万高速铁路

Overview
- Status: Operational (Zhengzhou-Xiangyang section)
- Owner: China Railway
- Locale: Henan, Hubei, Chongqing
- Termini: Zhengzhou East; Wanzhou North

Service
- Operator: China Railway High-speed

Technical
- Num of tracks: 2
- Track gauge: 1,435 mm (4 ft 8 1/2 in)
- Operating speed: 350 km/h (217 mph)

Zhengzhou–Wanzhou high-speed railway (Chinese: 郑万高速铁路) is a high-speed railway connecting Zhengzhou, the capital of Henan province, and Wanzhou District in Chongqing. The section between Zhengzhou East and Xiangyang East started operation on 1 December 2019. It connects with the Chongqing–Wanzhou intercity railway, jointly forming the Zhengzhou–Chongqing high-speed railway. The line forms part of the Hohhot–Nanning corridor. The section from Xingshan to Wanzhou also forms part of the Yangtze River high-speed railway corridor.

The railway was approved by the National Development and Reform Commission in 2014. Construction began in 2016, and the line fully opened in June 2022.

== History ==
The Zhengzhou to Xiangyang section opened on 1 December 2019. The remaining section between Xiangyang and Wanzhou opened on 20 June 2022.

== Stations ==
Station Name	Chinese	Metro transfers/connections
Zhengzhou East		1 5
Zhengzhou Hangkonggang		Chengjiao
Changge North
Yuzhou
Jiaxian
Pingdingshan West
Fangcheng
Nanyang East
Dengzhou East
Xiangyang East
Nanzhang
Baokangxian
Shennongjia
Xingshan
Badong
Wushan
Fengjie
Yunyang
Wanzhou North
