= Dazhou South railway station =

Railway station in Sichuan, China

Dazhou South

General information
- Location: Binlang Street, Dazhou High-tech Zone
- Coordinates: 31.096°N 107.473°E
- Platforms: 7
- Tracks: 16

History
- Opening: 2027
Location

Dazhou South railway station is a railway station under construction in Sichuan, China. It will serve the city of Dazhou on the Chengdu–Dazhou–Wanzhou high-speed railway and Xi'an–Chongqing high speed railway, making it a hub station of the Eight Vertical and Eight Horizontal network. The station is located 13.3 km from the city centre.

The tracks at the station are elevated, totaling 16 tracks and 7 passenger platforms.

The station design incorporates elements inspired by the Bashan Grand Canyon.
