= Chengdu–Dazhou–Wanzhou high-speed railway =

High-speed rail line in China

Chengdu–Dazhou–Wanzhou high-speed railway 成达万高速铁路
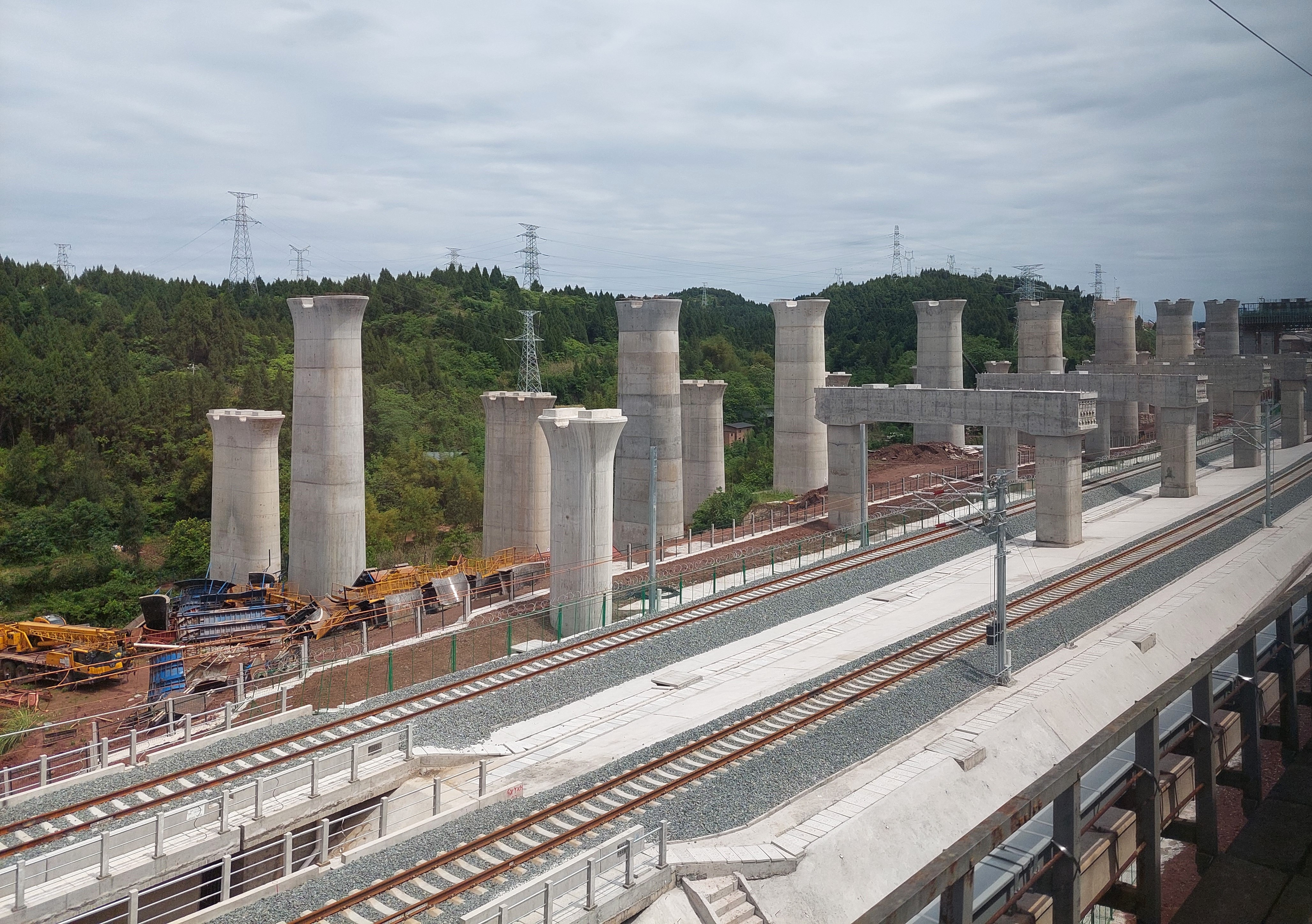
- Under construction near Nanchong North

Overview
- Status: Under construction
- Termini: Tianfu; Wanzhou North
- Stations: 13

Service
- Operator: China Railway Chengdu Group

Technical
- Line length: 477 km (296 mi)
- Track gauge: 1,435 mm (4 ft 8 1/2 in)
- Operating speed: 350 km/h (217 mph)

The Chengdu–Dazhou–Wanzhou high-speed railway or Chengdawan HSR (Chinese: 成达万高速铁路; pinyin: Chéngdáwàn Gāosù Tiělù) is a high-speed railway currently under construction in China. This line forms part of the Shanghai–Chongqing–Chengdu high-speed railway.

== History ==
This railway was planned as early as 2015. Construction began on 30 September 2022.

== Route ==
The newly built section runs between Ziyang West and Wanzhou North. Trains bound for Chengdu and Chengdu Tianfu International Airport can use the Chengdu–Yibin high-speed railway to head further northwest. The Xi'an–Chongqing high speed railway and Zhengzhou–Wanzhou high-speed railway connects to the Chengdawan HSR and allow trains to continue north to Xi'an or east to Zhengzhou.

== Stations ==
Station Name	Chinese	Metro transfers/connections
Ziyang West	资阳西	Chengdu–Yibin high-speed railway
Lezhi	乐至	
Suining	遂宁	
Pengxi South	蓬溪南	
Nanchong North	南充北	
Yingshan West	营山西	
Quxian North	渠县北	
Dazhou South	达州南	Xi'an–Chongqing high speed railway (Chongqing Branch)
Kaijiang South	开江南	
Yuexi	岳溪	
Wanzhou North	万州北	Xi'an–Chongqing high speed railway (Wanzhou Branch) Zhengzhou–Wanzhou high-speed railway
