= Yichang North railway station =

Railway station in Hubei

Yichang North 宜昌北站
- Platforms 4 and 5

General information
- Location: Wanjiafan, Longquan, Yiling, Yichang, Hubei; China
- Coordinates: 30°44′54.31″N 111°28′09.78″E
- Operator: CR Wuhan Group
- Lines: Wuhan–Yichang HSR; Yichang–Xingshan HSR; Chongqing–Yichang HSR
- Platforms: 9

History
- Opened: 26 December 2025
Location

Yichang North Station (Chinese: 宜昌北站) is located in Wanjiafan, Longquan, Yiling, Yichang, Hubei, China. It is a station on the Wuhan–Yichang HSR of the Shanghai–Chongqing–Chengdu high-speed railway and the Yichang–Xingshan HSR. It was put into use on 26 December 2025. It will serve as one end of the Chongqing–Yichang HSR, currently under construction and due to open in 2029.

The station has 9 platforms and 20 tracks, with a total building area of more than 80,000 m^{2} (860,000 sq ft). It is equipped with a high-speed train depot and is a regional hub station. It is currently under the jurisdiction of Yichang Railway Section of the China Railway Wuhan Group.
