= Chongqing east ring line =

Railway line in Chongqing, China

Chongqing Railway Hub east ring line simplified Chinese: 重庆铁路枢纽东环线; traditional Chinese: 重慶鐵路樞紐東環線; pinyin: Chóngqìng tiělù shūniǔ dōng huánxiàn
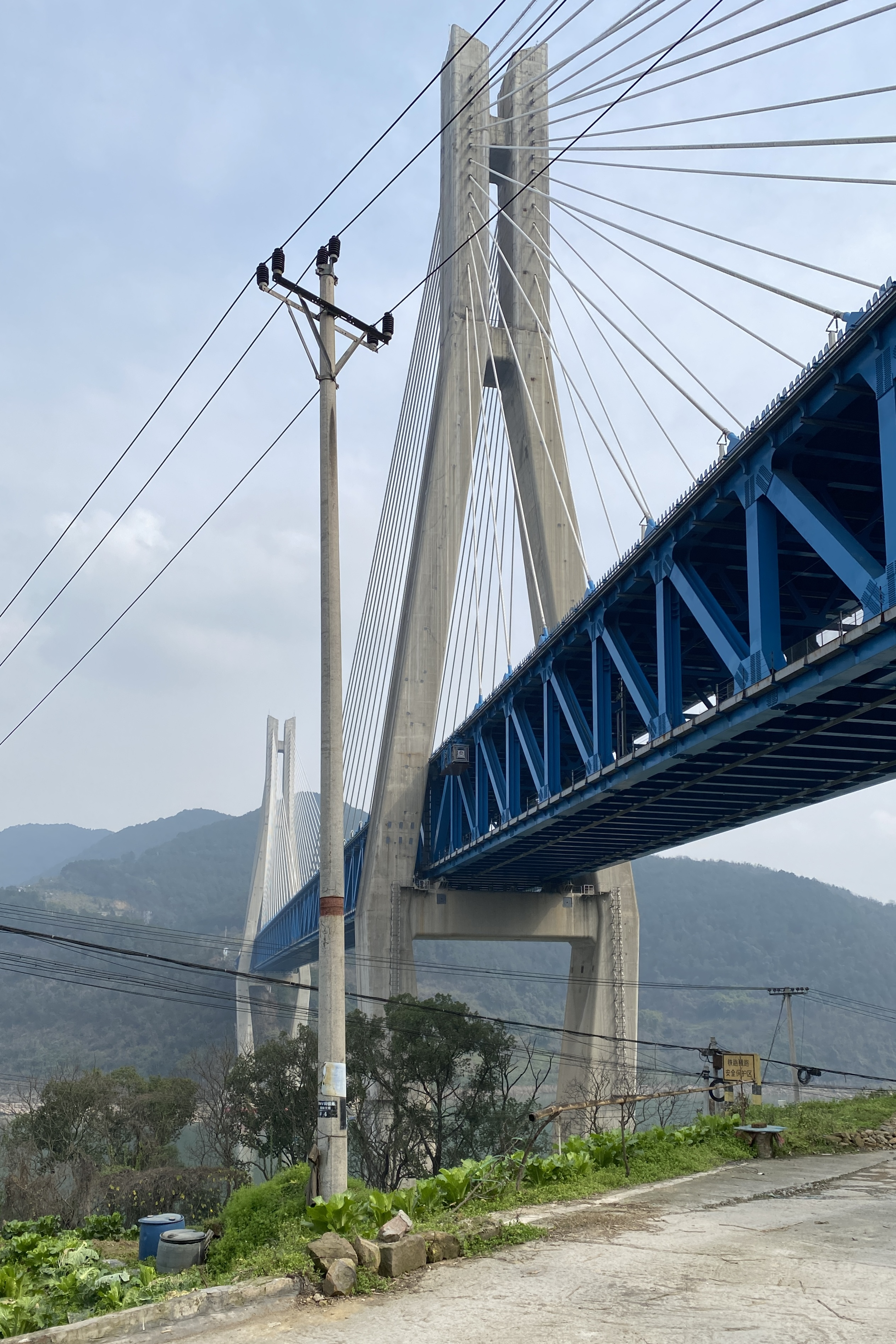
- The Mingyuexia Yangtze River Bridge is a dedicated railway bridge spanning the Yangtze River on the Chongqing East Ring Railway

Overview
- Status: Open
- Owner: China Railway
- Locale: Chongqing, China
- Termini: Luohuang South; Moxinpo
- Stations: 13

Service
- Operator: CR Chengdu Group

History
- Opened: 30 December 2022

Technical
- Line length: 221 km (137 mi)
- Num of tracks: 2
- Track gauge: 1,435 mm (4 ft 8 1/2 in)
- Electrification: 25 kV 50 Hz AC (overhead line)
- Operating speed: 120 kilometres per hour (75 miles per hour)

The Chongqing Railway Hub east ring line (Chinese: 重庆铁路枢纽东环线) is a railway line in Chongqing, China. It opened on 30 December 2022. The line is double-track, 160 kilometres (99 miles) long, and has a maximum speed of 160 kilometres per hour (99 miles per hour). The railway consists of Main line, Airport branch and Huangmaoping branch.

== Airport branch ==
A branch line runs from Chongqing North railway station and joins the main line between Gulu and Tongjing. The branch also pass through Jiangbei Airport with Jiangbei Airport railway station. It has a maximum speed of 120 kilometres per hour (75 miles per hour).

== Huangmaoping branch ==
Huangmaoping branch runs from Shuitu railway station to Huangmaoping railway station.
