= Nanchong North railway station =

Railway station in Nanchong, Sichuan

Nanchong North 南充北
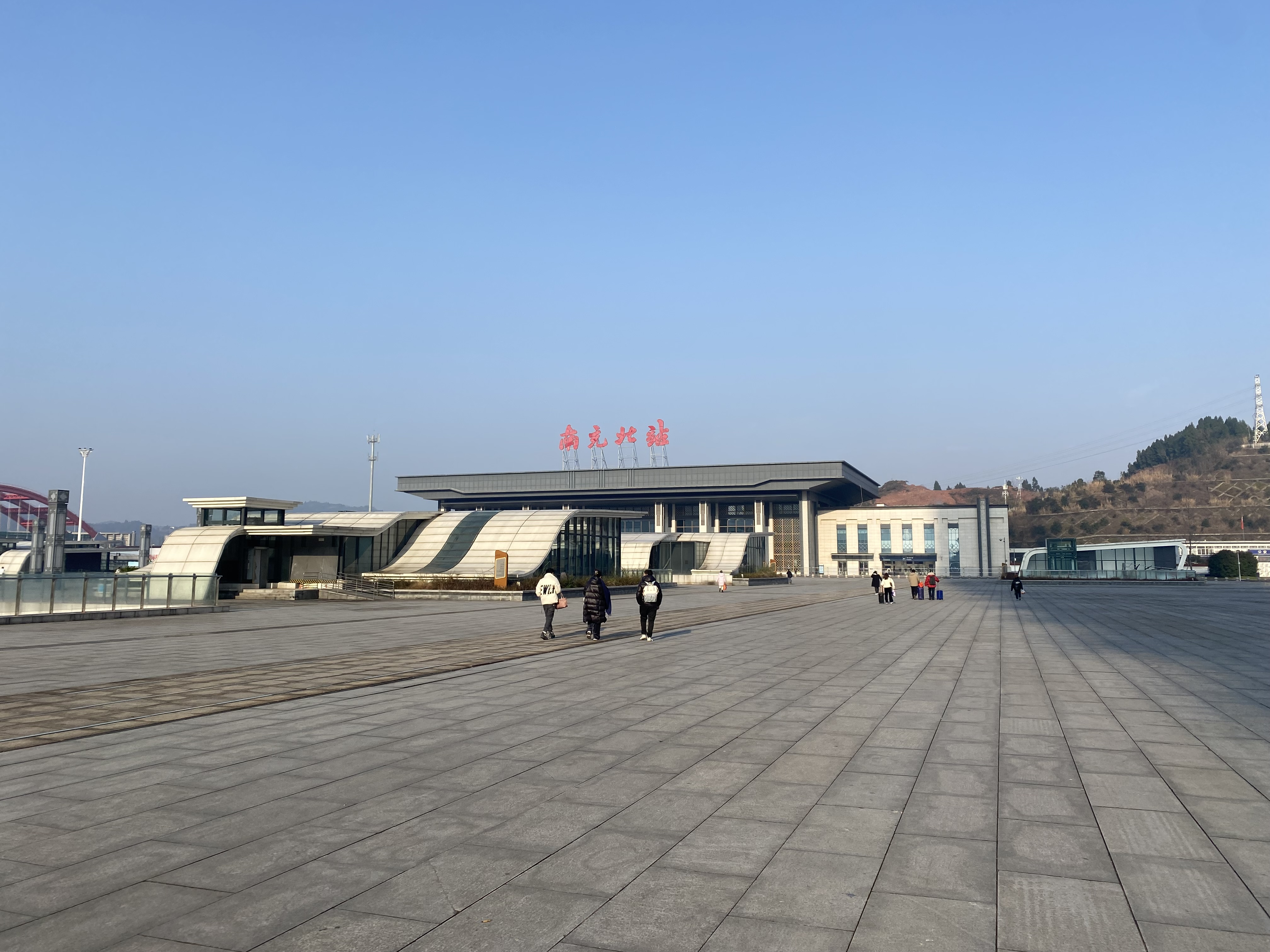
- Nanchong North railway station in 2023

General information
- Location: Shunqing District, Nanchong, Sichuan; China
- Coordinates: 30°51′35.54″N 106°3′57.37″E
- Operated by: China Railway Chengdu Group
- Lines: Chongqing–Lanzhou railway; Chengdu–Dazhou–Wanzhou high-speed railway (under construction); Hanzhong–Bazhong–Nanchong railway (under construction)
- Platforms: 5

History
- Opened: 30 December 2015
Location

Nanchong North railway station (Chinese: 南充北站) is a railway station in Shunqing District, Nanchong, Sichuan, China. It is an intermediate stop on the Chongqing–Lanzhou railway and operated by China Railway Chengdu Group.

Construction of the station was approved in June 2013. Construction officially began on 22 May 2014 and the station opened on 30 December 2015. It will be a stop on the currently under construction Chengdu–Dazhou–Wanzhou high-speed railway and Hanzhong–Bazhong–Nanchong railway.

There are two island platforms and one side platform, making for five platform faces in total.

== See also ==
- Nanchong railway station
