= Lezhi railway station =

Railway station in Ziyang, Sichuan

Lezhi 乐至

General information
- Location: Lezhi County, Ziyang, Sichuan; China
- Line(s): Second Chengdu–Chongqing high-speed railway (under construction); Chengdu–Dazhou–Wanzhou high-speed railway (under construction)
- Platforms: 4

Lezhi railway station (Chinese: 乐至站) is a planned railway station in Lezhi County, Ziyang, Sichuan, China. It will be located at the crossing point of the Second Chengdu–Chongqing high-speed railway and the Chengdu–Dazhou–Wanzhou high-speed railway and will have platforms on both lines.
