= Second Chengdu–Chongqing high-speed railway =

Planned railway line in China

Second Chengdu–Chongqing high-speed railway 成渝中线高铁

Overview
- Status: Under construction
- Locale: Sichuan and Chongqing
- Termini: Chengdu; Chongqing North
- Stations: 8

Service
- Type: High-speed rail
- Operator: China Railway High-speed

Technical
- Line length: 292 km (181 mi)
- Track gauge: 1,435 mm (4 ft 8 1/2 in) standard gauge
- Operating speed: Planned: 350 km/h (217 mph); Reserved: 400 km/h (250 mph)

The Second Chengdu–Chongqing high-speed railway (Chinese: 成渝中线高铁; lit. 'Chengdu–Chongqing Central line high-speed railway') is a 292-kilometre (181 mi) long high-speed rail line that connects the cities of Chengdu (in Sichuan Province) and Chongqing in southwestern China, with a maximum speed of 350 km/h (220 mph) and a future design speed of 400 km/h (250 mph). It will head via Lezhi, Anyue, and Dazu. Construction started on September 26, 2021 and it is expected to open in 2027.

The 292 kilometres (181 mi) long Second Chengdu–Chongqing high-speed railway will take a more direct route than the existing 307 kilometres (191 mi) long high-speed Chengdu–Chongqing intercity railway and is expected to reduce journey times between the two cities to 50 minutes. In addition, the section between Jianzhou and Dazu Shike will be designed for 400 km/h (250 mph) operations in the future, creating potential conditions for further reductions to travel time.

== History ==
Approval for the 69.273 billion yuan project was granted on August 17, 2021, by the National Development and Reform Commission. Later the project cost was revised to 73.3 billion yuan. Construction started on September 26, 2021.

== Stations ==
Station Name	Chinese	Metro transfers/connections
Chengdu	成都	1 7
Jianzhou	简州	
Lezhi	乐至	
Anyue	安岳	
Dazu Shike	大足石刻	
Tongliang	铜梁	
Kexuecheng	科学城	
Chongqing North	重庆北	Line 4 Line 10 (North Square); Line 3 Line 10 Loop line (South Square)

== Other railways between Chengdu and Chongqing ==
The first railway between the two cities was the Chengdu–Chongqing railway, completed in the 1950s. The Suining–Chengdu railway and Suining–Chongqing railway form a route between the two cities which was completed in 2006. The fastest journeys on this line take just over two hours. The Chengdu–Chongqing intercity railway was completed in 2015.
