= Chongqing Three Gorges University =

University in Chongqing, China

Coordinates: 30°47′41″N 108°23′01″E

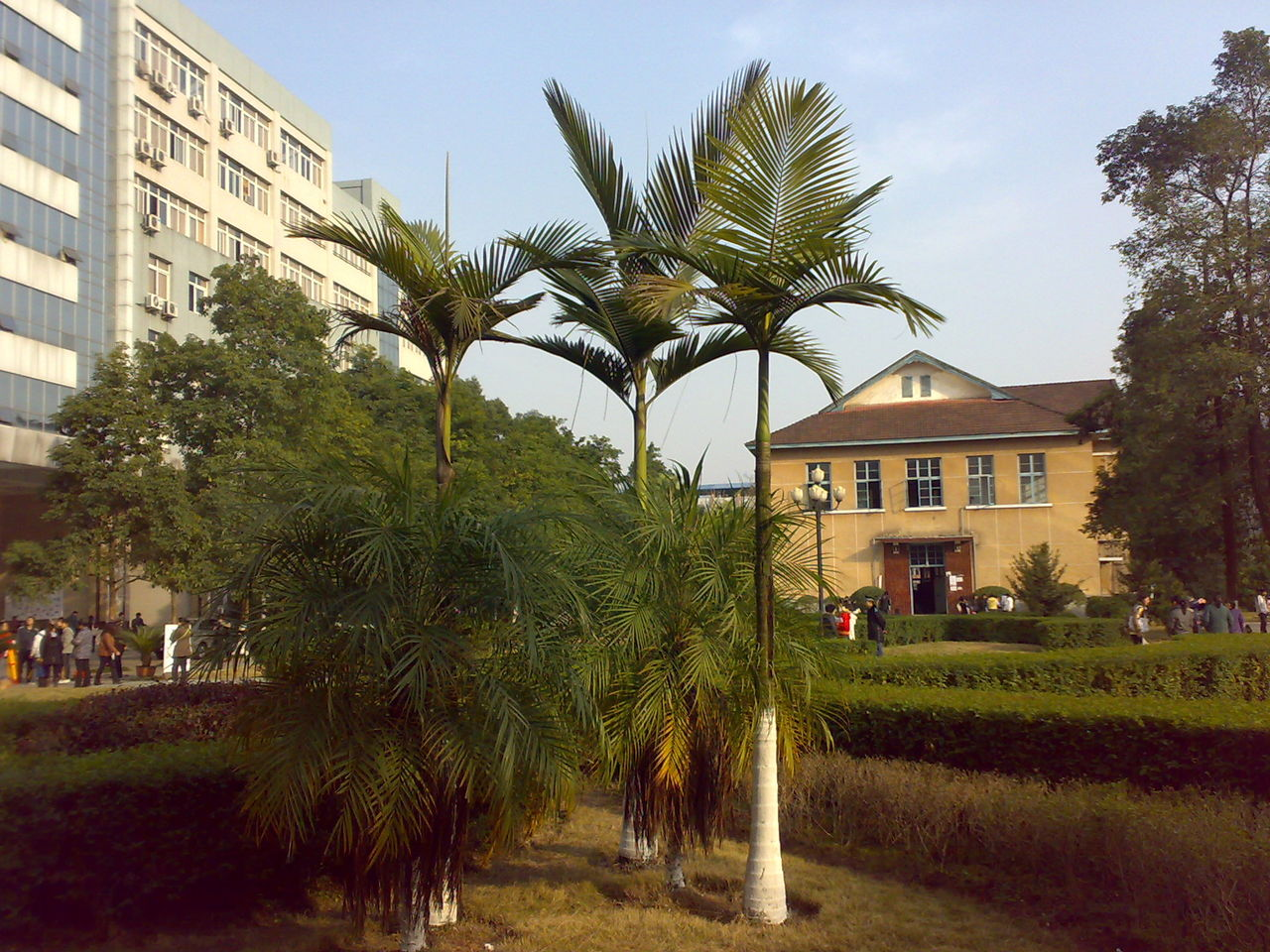

Chongqing Three Gorges University (CTGU, simplified Chinese: 重庆三峡学院; traditional Chinese: 重慶三峽學院), established in 1956, is a national comprehensive university in Wanzhou District, Chongqing, at the heart of the Three Gorges areas on the Yangtze River. It presently has a total enrolment of 13,000 full-time domestic students and international students; and a staff of about 1,000, including about 300 professors and associate professors, about 400 Master's Degree or Doctor's Degree winners, and more than 60 external part-time Professors and international teachers. CTGU has 14 teaching faculties. It has more than 70 specialties for 3-year students and 4-year students, which cover eight disciplinary domains. It has prominent advantages in the teaching and research of the specialties of marketing, international trade, environmental protection, folk art, languages and literature, physical education, tourism, biology, chemical engineering, ethnonymics, and occupies the leading position in China in some of the specialties and subjects (As of 2009).

CTGU has established wide cooperation and exchange relationship with many universities both at home and abroad, and has developed teachers/students exchange and academic exchange. In 2007, CTGU established collaboratively a Confucius Institute at Community College of Denver in Colorado, USA.
