= Xi'an–Chongqing high-speed railway =

High speed rail line in China

Xi'an–Chongqing high-speed railway 西渝高速铁路

Overview
- Status: In operation (Xi'an East - Ankang West)
- Termini: Xi'an East; Chongqing West / Wanzhou North

Service
- Operator: China Railway High-speed

History
- Opened: 28 September 2026; 2 days ago (Xi'an East - Ankang West)

Technical
- Line length: 653 km (406 mi)
- Track gauge: 1,435 mm (4 ft 8 1/2 in)
- Operating speed: 350 km/h (217 mph)

The Xi'an–Chongqing high speed railway is an under construction high-speed railway line in China. It is 653 kilometres (406 mi) long and has a design speed of 350 kilometres per hour (220 mph). It will be part of the Baotou (Yinchuan)–Hainan corridor.

== History ==
Work on the 170.42 km (106 mi) section between Xi'an and Ankang began on 29 June 2021. It was completed on 28 September 2026. Construction of the remaining section in Shaanxi Province south to the Shaanxi-Sichuan border started on 30 November 2022 and a few days later, on 2 December 2022, the Dazhou section in Sichuan Province officially started construction. The Dezhou section is scheduled to be complete by 2028. The remaining Sichuan section to Chongqing via Guang'an started construction in 17 February 2023. On 13 August 2023 the first foundation for a viaduct pier on the Chongqing section of the Xi'an–Chongqing high speed railway was poured.

=== Main line ===
Station Name	Chinese	CR transfers/connections	Metro transfers/connections
Chongqing West	重庆西		Line 5 Loop line
Beibei South	北碚南		
Hechuan East	合川东		
Guang'an East	广安东		
Dazhu	大竹		
Dazhou South	达州南	Chengdu–Dazhou–Wanzhou high-speed railway	
Xuanhan South	宣汉南		
Fankuai	樊哙	Branch line	
Chengkou	城口		
Langao	岚皋		
Ankang West	安康西		
Tongmu	桐木		
Zhen'an West	镇安西		
Zhashui West	柞水西		
Niubeiliang	太河		
Xi'an East	西安东		Line 5

=== Branch line ===
The Branch line runs from Fankuai railway station in Xuanhan County, Sichuan Province to Wanzhou North railway station in Wanzhou District, Chongqing.

Station Name	Chinese	CR transfers/connections	Metro transfers/connections
Fankuai	樊哙	Main line	
Kaizhou	开州		
Wanzhou North	万州北		
