= Lezhi County =

Lezhi County 乐至县
- County
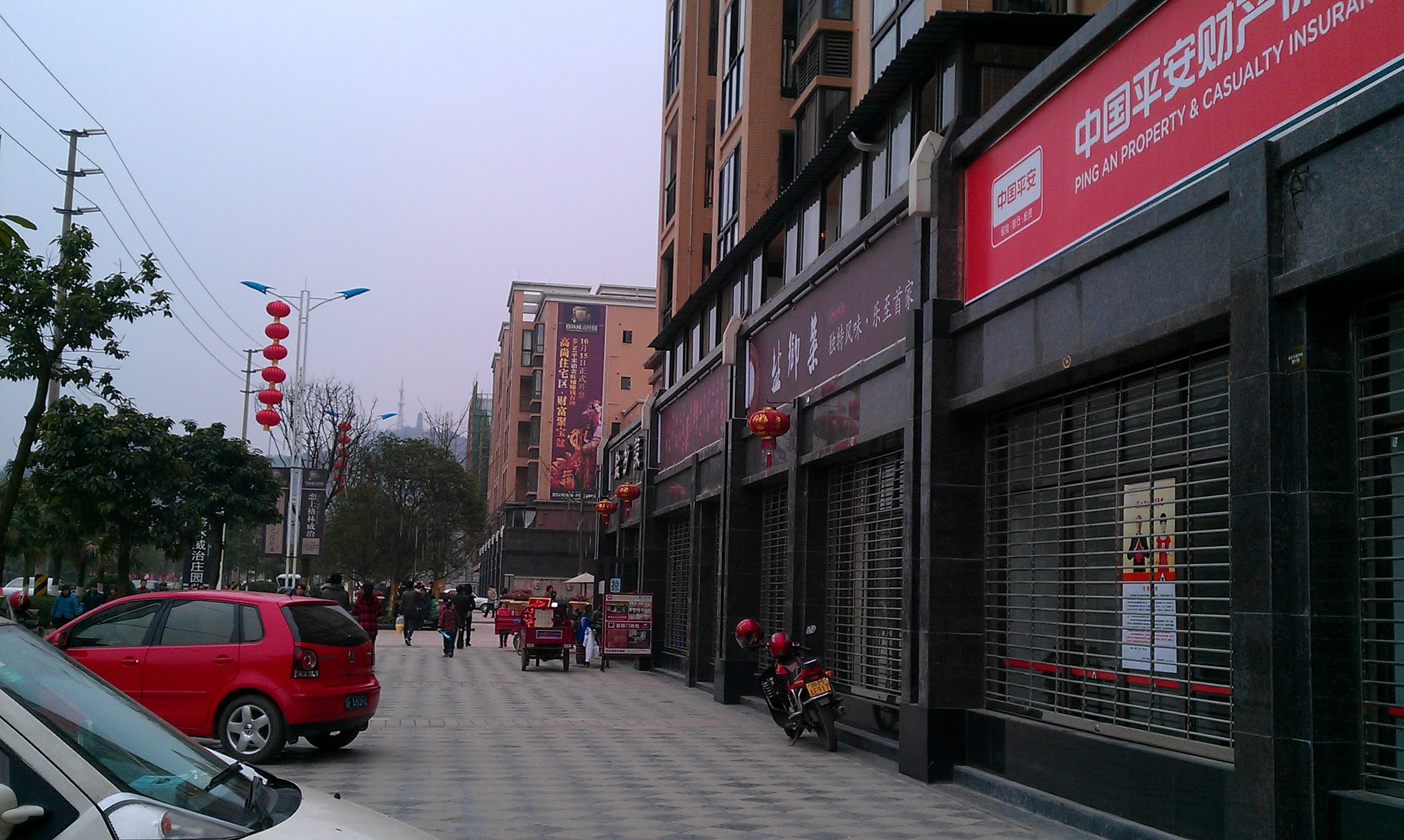

- Location of the seat in Sichuan
- Coordinates: 30°17′13″N 105°01′12″E
- Country: China
- Province: Sichuan
- Prefecture-level city: Ziyang

Area
  - Total: 1,425 km^{2} (550 sq mi)

Population (2020 census)
  - Total: 490,573
  - Density: 344.3/km^{2} (891.6/sq mi)
- Time zone: UTC+8 (China Standard)

Lezhi County (simplified Chinese: 乐至县; traditional Chinese: 樂至縣; pinyin: Lèzhì Xiàn) is a county of Sichuan Province, China. It is under the administration of Ziyang city.

== Administrative divisions ==
Lezhi County comprises 2 subdistricts, 18 towns and 1 township:

subdistricts

- Tianchi 天池街道
- Nanta 南塔街道

towns

- Shifo 石佛镇
- Huilan 回澜镇
- Shituan 石湍镇
- Tongjia 童家镇
- Baolin 宝林镇
- Dafo 大佛镇
- Liang'an 良安镇
- Jinshun 金顺镇
- Zhonghechang 中和场镇
- Laodong 劳动镇
- Zhongtian 中天镇
- Foxing 佛星镇
- Panlong 蟠龙镇
- Dongshan 东山镇
- Tonglü 通旅镇
- Gaosi 高寺镇
- Longmen 龙门镇
- Shengchi 盛池镇

township

- Shuanghechang 双河场乡

== Climate ==
Climate data for Lezhi, elevation 463 m (1,519 ft), (1991–2020 normals, extremes 1981–present)
Month	Jan	Feb	Mar	Apr	May	Jun	Jul	Aug	Sep	Oct	Nov	Dec	Year
Record high °C (°F)	18.9 (66.0)	22.8 (73.0)	31.6 (88.9)	33.3 (91.9)	35.9 (96.6)	36.2 (97.2)	41.1 (106.0)	42.0 (107.6)	39.4 (102.9)	29.7 (85.5)	24.9 (76.8)	17.8 (64.0)	42.0 (107.6)
Mean daily maximum °C (°F)	9.2 (48.6)	12.3 (54.1)	17.3 (63.1)	23.0 (73.4)	26.7 (80.1)	28.6 (83.5)	31.0 (87.8)	31.0 (87.8)	26.2 (79.2)	20.6 (69.1)	16.0 (60.8)	10.4 (50.7)	21.0 (69.9)
Daily mean °C (°F)	6.3 (43.3)	8.8 (47.8)	13.1 (55.6)	18.2 (64.8)	21.9 (71.4)	24.3 (75.7)	26.6 (79.9)	26.4 (79.5)	22.2 (72.0)	17.3 (63.1)	12.8 (55.0)	7.7 (45.9)	17.1 (62.8)
Mean daily minimum °C (°F)	4.2 (39.6)	6.4 (43.5)	10.1 (50.2)	14.6 (58.3)	18.2 (64.8)	21.1 (70.0)	23.3 (73.9)	23.1 (73.6)	19.6 (67.3)	15.2 (59.4)	10.6 (51.1)	5.7 (42.3)	14.3 (57.8)
Record low °C (°F)	−2.4 (27.7)	−2.2 (28.0)	−0.2 (31.6)	5.3 (41.5)	8.7 (47.7)	14.4 (57.9)	17.0 (62.6)	15.5 (59.9)	13.4 (56.1)	3.4 (38.1)	0.3 (32.5)	−3.7 (25.3)	−3.7 (25.3)
Average precipitation mm (inches)	12.7 (0.50)	16.5 (0.65)	28.9 (1.14)	54.5 (2.15)	88.0 (3.46)	144.2 (5.68)	191.9 (7.56)	180.1 (7.09)	116.5 (4.59)	56.8 (2.24)	20.8 (0.82)	12.4 (0.49)	923.3 (36.37)
Average precipitation days (≥ 0.1 mm)	8.0	7.5	9.2	11.3	12.6	14.5	13.4	12.1	14.3	15.2	8.1	6.9	133.1
Average snowy days	1.5	0.6	0	0	0	0	0	0	0	0	0	0.4	2.5
Average relative humidity (%)	83	79	74	73	71	79	81	79	84	86	84	84	80
Mean monthly sunshine hours	49.8	60.3	101.2	138.0	142.7	124.5	163.4	170.2	98.7	68.6	69.1	45.2	1,231.7
Percentage possible sunshine	15	19	27	36	34	30	38	42	27	20	22	14	27
Source: China Meteorological Administrationall-time extreme temperatureall-time July high

== Transportation ==
Lezhi railway station, currently under construction, will serve the area.
