= Xiangyang East railway station =

Railway station in Xiangyang, Hubei, China

Xiangyang East 襄阳东

General information
- Location: Xiangzhou District, Xiangyang, Hubei; China
- Coordinates: 32°0′58.61″N 112°17′25.38″E
- Operator: China Railway Corporation
- Lines: Wuhan–Shiyan high-speed railway Zhengzhou–Wanzhou high-speed railway

History
- Opened: 29 November 2019
Location

Xiangyang East railway station is a railway station located in Xiangzhou District, Xiangyang, Hubei, China.

== History ==
The station opened with the first stage of the Wuhan–Shiyan high-speed railway. Subsequently, on 1 December, the station became an interchange with the opening of the first stage of the Zhengzhou–Wanzhou high-speed railway.

The planned Xiangyang–Jingmen high-speed railway and the Xiangyang–Guiyang high-speed railway will start at this station.

Preceding station	China Railway High-speed	Following station
Zaoyang towards Hankou	Wuhan–Shiyan high-speed railway	Gucheng North towards Shiyan East
Dengzhou East towards Zhengzhou East	Zhengzhou–Wanzhou high-speed railway	Nanzhang towards Wanzhou North
