= Xingshan railway station =

Railway station in China

Xingshan 兴山
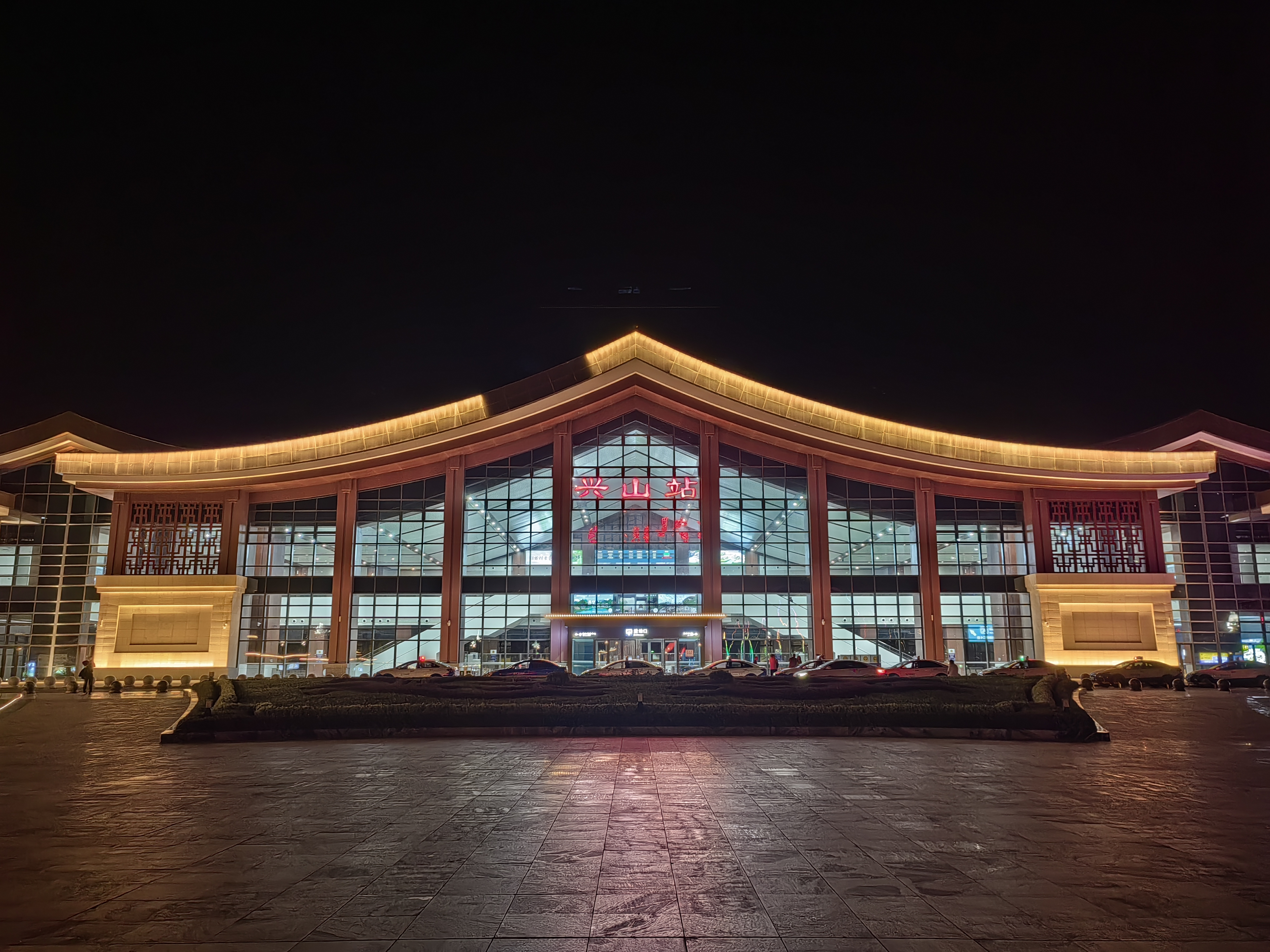

General information
- Location: Beidouping village, Gufu town, Xingshan County, Yichang, Hubei Province; China
- Coordinates: 31°19′38″N 110°44′43″E
- Operator: China Railway Wuhan Group
- Lines: Zhengzhou–Wanzhou high-speed railway Yichang–Xingshan high-speed railway
Location

Xingshan railway station is a railway station, located on the Zhengzhou–Wanzhou high-speed railway and the Yichang–Xingshan high-speed railway in Beidouping village, Gufu town, Xingshan County, Yichang, Hubei Province, China.

== History ==
The station opened with the Zhengzhou–Wanzhou high-speed railway in June 2022. It is the western terminus of the Yichang–Xingshan high-speed railway which opened in September 2026, running to Yichang East.
