= Chongqing North railway station =

Railway station in Chongqing, China

Chongqingbei 重庆北
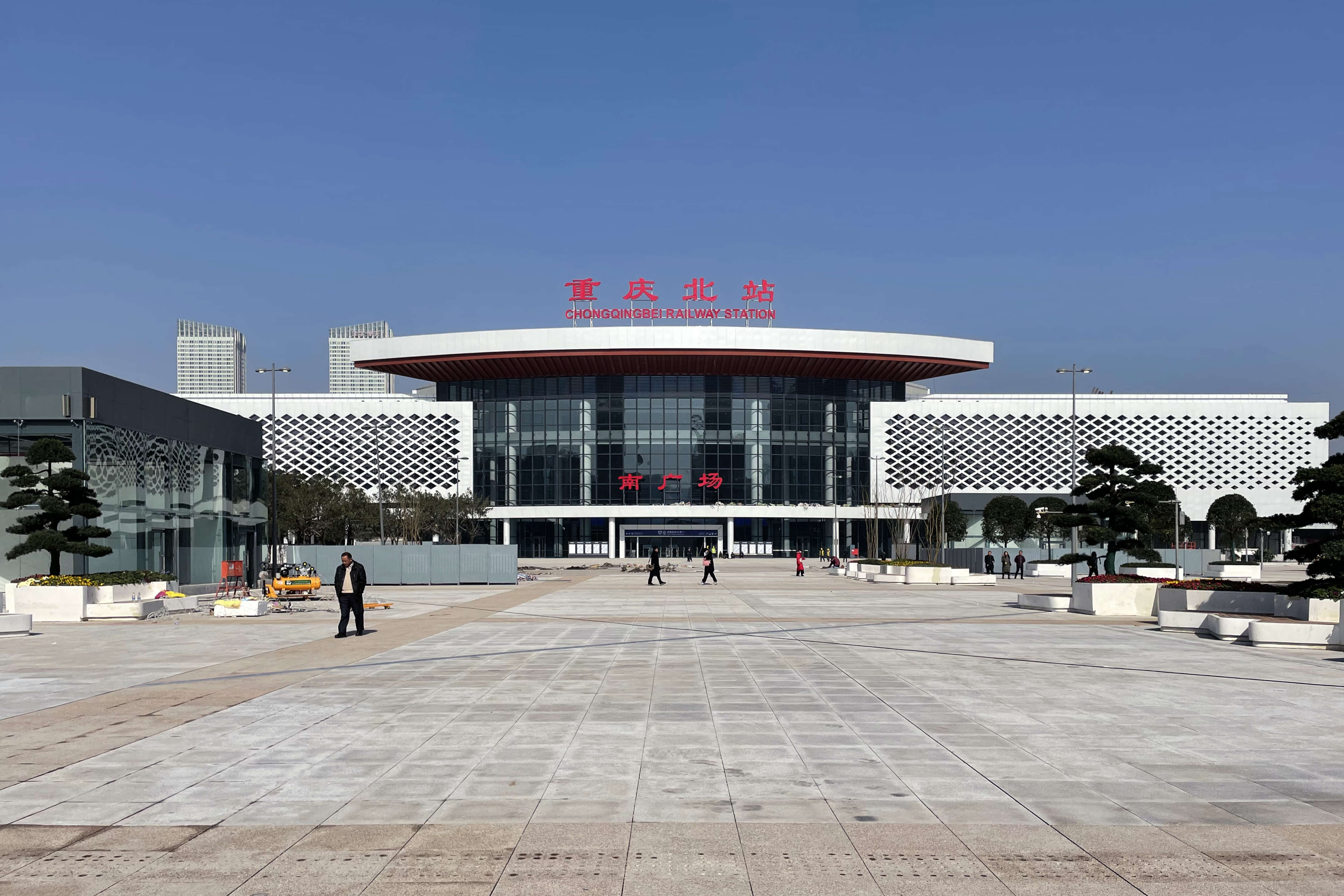
- Chongqing North railway station

General information
- Other names: Chongqing North
- Location: Kunlun Avenue, Yubei District, Chongqing; China
- Coordinates: 29°36′37.5″N 106°32′49.5″E
- Operator: China Railway Chengdu Group; China Railway Corporation
- Lines: Chongqing–Huaihua railway; Suining–Chongqing railway; Chongqing–Lichuan railway; Chongqing east ring line (airport branch); Second Chengdu–Chongqing high-speed railway (U/C)
- Platforms: 26 (12 island platforms and 2 side platforms)
- Connections: North Square of Chongqingbei Railway Station station; South Square of Chongqingbei Railway Station station; Bus terminal

Other information
- Station code: 35143; CUW (Telegram code); CQB (Pinyin code)

History
- Opened: 22 October 2006
Location

Chongqing North railway station is a railway station located in Yubei District, Chongqing, China. It is served by the Yuhuai Railway, Suining–Chongqing Railway and Yuli Railway, and operated by the China Railway Chengdu Group.

== Name ==
Prior to the construction of this station at its present site, Shapingba railway station was known as Chongqing North railway station. It was subsequently renamed to avoid confusion and to better reflect the geographic nature of both stations.

== Structure ==
This station consists of two separate departure halls; the eastern hall is for long-distance services and the western hall is for high-speed CRH trains. Arrivals are through a common underground hall.

Service at this station is separated into North and South Courses. The South Course handles long-distance trains to many parts of China. The North Course is currently being expanded and will handle mostly high-speed intercity services.

== Metro ==
- Chongqing North Station North Square station (Line 4 & Line 10)
- Chongqing North Station South Square station (Line 3 & Line 10 & Loop Line)

== Service ==
This station currently handles most long-distance train services to and from Chongqing, whilst Chongqing railway station is closed for renovations (due to finish in 2015). It is also the main high-speed railway connection to Chengdu via Suining.

== History ==
The station has been in operation since October 2006.

== See also ==
- Chongqing railway station
- Chongqing West railway station
- Shapingba railway station

Preceding station	China Railway High-speed	Following station
Terminus	Chongqing–Wanzhou intercity railway	Fusheng towards Wanzhou North
Terminus	Chongqing–Lichuan railway	Fusheng towards Lichuan
