= Chongqing–Wanzhou intercity railway =

Railway line in China

Chongqing–Wanzhou Intercity Railway 渝万城际铁路

Overview
- Status: Operating
- Locale: Chongqing
- Termini: Chongqing North; Wanzhou North
- Stations: 7

Service
- Type: High-speed rail
- Operator: China Railway Chengdu Group

History
- Opened: 28 November 2016

Technical
- Line length: 248 km (154 mi)
- Track gauge: 1,435 mm (4 ft 8 1/2 in) standard gauge
- Operating speed: 250 km/h (155 mph)

Chongqing–Wanzhou intercity railway
- Simplified Chinese: 渝万城际铁路
- Traditional Chinese: 渝萬城際鐵路
Transcriptions
Standard Mandarin
- Hanyu Pinyin: Yú-Wàn chéngjì tiělù

Chongqing–Wanzhou passenger dedicated line
- Simplified Chinese: 渝万客运专线
- Traditional Chinese: 渝萬客運專線
Transcriptions
Standard Mandarin
- Hanyu Pinyin: Yú-Wàn kèyùn zhuānxiàn

Chongqing–Wanzhou intercity railway is a high speed railway between urban Chongqing and its satellite district of Wanzhou. It is also known at the Yu-Wan Railway, which are abbreviations for Chongqing and Wanzhou. Construction started in December 2012, according to the summarizing and commending meeting of the phase II of "100-day Battle" in Chongqing Liangjiang New Area. It was completed on 29 November 2016 and takes passengers from Chongqing North Railway Station to Wanzhou North railway station in one hour.

This railway forms a smaller section of two larger railway projects, the Chongqing–Xi'an high-speed railway and the Zhengzhou–Chongqing high-speed railway, extending north and northeast from Wanzhou respectively.

== Route Description ==
The 248 km (154 mi)-long Chongqing–Wanzhou railway is designed to run at a speed of 250 km/h (155 mph) connecting Chongqing North Railway, Fusheng, Changshou, Changshou Lake, Dianjiang County, Liangping and Wanzhou, according to the approval from The Ministry of Railways of PRC.

- It has been built as a double tracked electrified high speed railway.
- It has been built to the heavy rail standard with continuous welded track on ballastless track
- The length of the line supported on bridges or viaducts is 39.67% of the total railway length.
- The length of the line through tunnels is 31.77% of total railway length. The longest at 10,617 m (34,833 ft) and the shortest tunnel at 84 m (276 ft).
- The length of the line built at grade, on ground level is 29.66%
- The length of the roadbed within the stations is 1.9 km (1.2 mi).

== Operations ==
The train can take passengers from Wanzhou North or Dianjiang County to urban Chongqing in 90 or 30 minutes respectively. High speed services extend to Chengdu with a travel time of 3 and a half hours.

== Future ==
A second route between Chongqing and Wanzhou, the Chongqing–Wanzhou high-speed railway, on a faster 350 kilometres per hour (220 mph) alignment, is expected to open in 2025.
