= Wanzhou North railway station =

Railway station in China

Wanzhou North 万州北
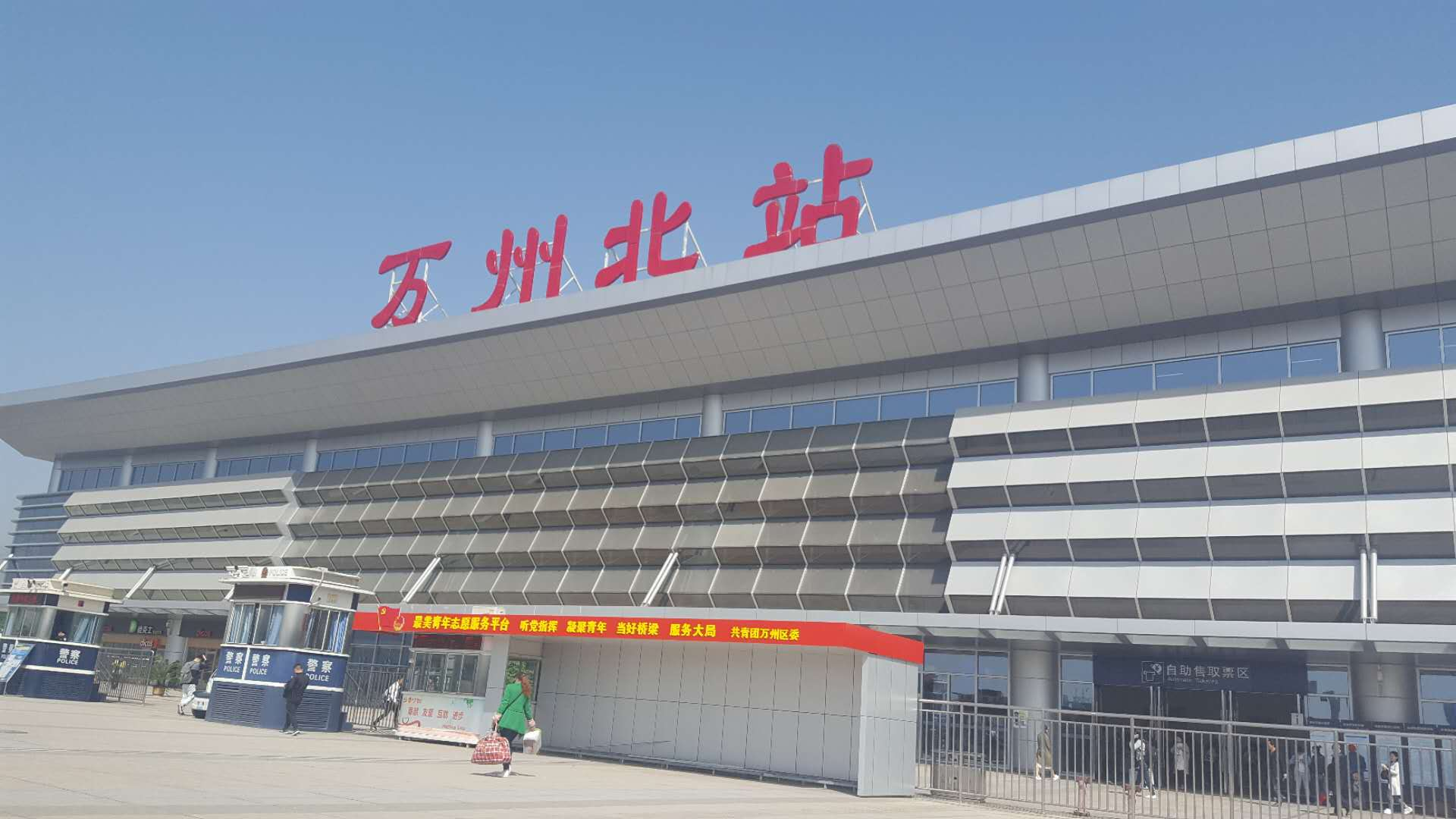
- Wanzhou North in 2018

General information
- Location: Wanzhou District, Chongqing; China
- Coordinates: 30.8655°N 108.36219°E
- Lines: Chongqing–Wanzhou intercity railway; Chongqing–Wanzhou high-speed railway (under construction); Zhengzhou–Wanzhou high-speed railway; Chengdu–Dazhou–Wanzhou high-speed railway (under construction); Chongqing–Xi'an high-speed railway (branch, under planning)

History
- Opened: 28 November 2016
Location

Wanzhou North railway station (Chinese: 万州北) is a railway station in Wanzhou District, Chongqing, China. It is served by the Zhengzhou–Wanzhou high-speed railway and the Chongqing–Wanzhou intercity railway. It is one of two passenger railway stations in Wanzhou and the first to offer high-speed service. The other station is Wanzhou railway station which is served by trains on conventional lines.

== History ==
Wanzhou North railway station opened on 28 November 2016 along with the Chongqing–Wanzhou intercity railway. The station became a terminus of the Zhengzhou–Wanzhou high-speed railway on 20 June 2022.

== Future ==
The station will also be the terminus of a new Chongqing–Wanzhou route, Chongqing–Wanzhou high-speed railway, which will be faster and more direct than the existing route.

| Preceding station | China Railway High-speed | Following station |
|---|---|---|
| Liangping South towards Chongqing North | Chongqing–Wanzhou intercity railway | Terminus |
| Yunyang towards Zhengzhou East | Zhengzhou–Wanzhou high-speed railway | Terminus |
| Zhongxian towards Chongqing East | Chongqing–Wanzhou high-speed railway | Terminus |
