= Chongqing East railway station =

Railway station in Chongqing, China

Chongqingdong 重庆东
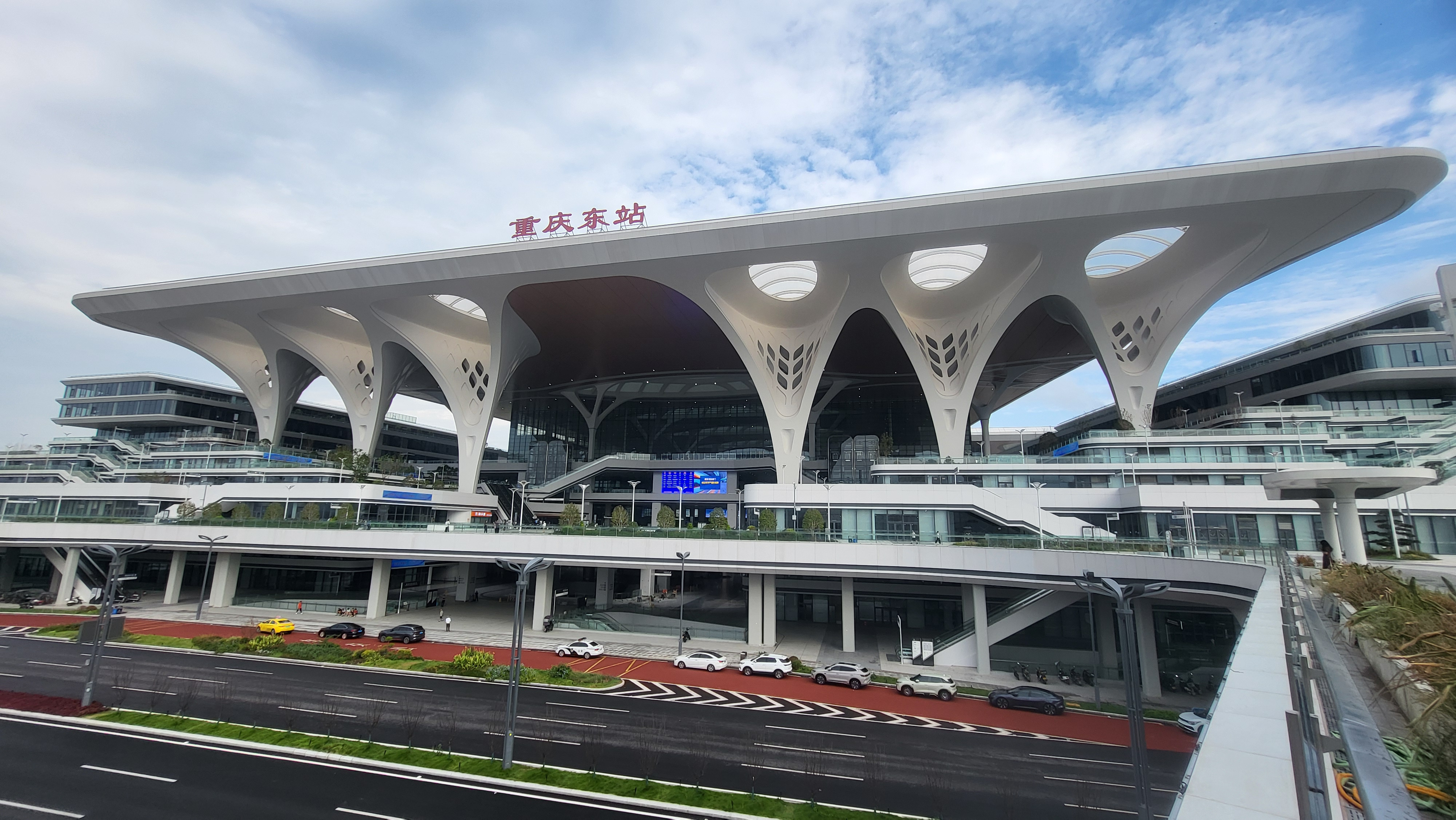
- The station in September 2025

Chinese name
- Simplified Chinese: 重庆东站
- Traditional Chinese: 重慶東站
Transcriptions
Standard Mandarin
- Hanyu Pinyin: Chóngqìng Dōng Zhàn

General information
- Location: 518 Kaicheng Avenue; Changshengqiao Town, Nan'an District, Chongqing; China
- Coordinates: 29°29′13″N 106°40′10″E
- Operator: China Railway Chengdu Group
- Line: Chongqing–Xiamen high-speed railway (June 27, 2025)
- Platforms: 29 (14 island, 1 side)
- Tracks: 29
- Connections: 6 Chongqingdong Railway Station

Construction
- Structure type: Elevated

Other information
- Station code: 30074
- Classification: Special Class station (特等站)

History
- Opened: June 27, 2025
Location

Chongqing East railway station (Chinese: 重庆东站) is a major passenger railway station in Nan'an District, Chongqing, China. It is one of the three main passenger hubs in the Chongqing railway network and on opening, according to Time Out magazine, became one of the largest passenger stations in the world.

== History ==
The station location in Chaoyuan New Area was first officially published by the Chongqing Municipal Planning and Natural Resources Bureau in November 2018. Construction officially began on 22 November 2018, concurrent with work on the Yú–Qián Intercity Railway (渝黔城际铁路).

By April 2024, major structural works such as roofing, interior fit-out, and M&E systems were in progress, together with road and bridge works in the surrounding area. The station opened to passengers on 27 June 2025.

== Layout ==
The station has 29 tracks and 15 platforms in total: 14 island platforms and one side platform, with six through (mainline) tracks.

The large station building is designed to support a significant passenger volume. It includes associated facilities such as storage and maintenance yards for both high-speed and conventional trains.

== Lines ==
Chongqing East serves multiple lines, including:

- Chongqing Railway Hub East Ring Line (重庆铁路枢纽东环线)
- Yuxiang high-speed railway (渝湘高速铁路, Chongqing–Qiannan segment)
- Zhengyu high-speed railway (under construction)
- Yukun high-speed railway (under construction)

When fully operational, the station will host both high-speed and conventional passenger services.

== Metro station ==
Chongqingdong Railway Station 重庆东站
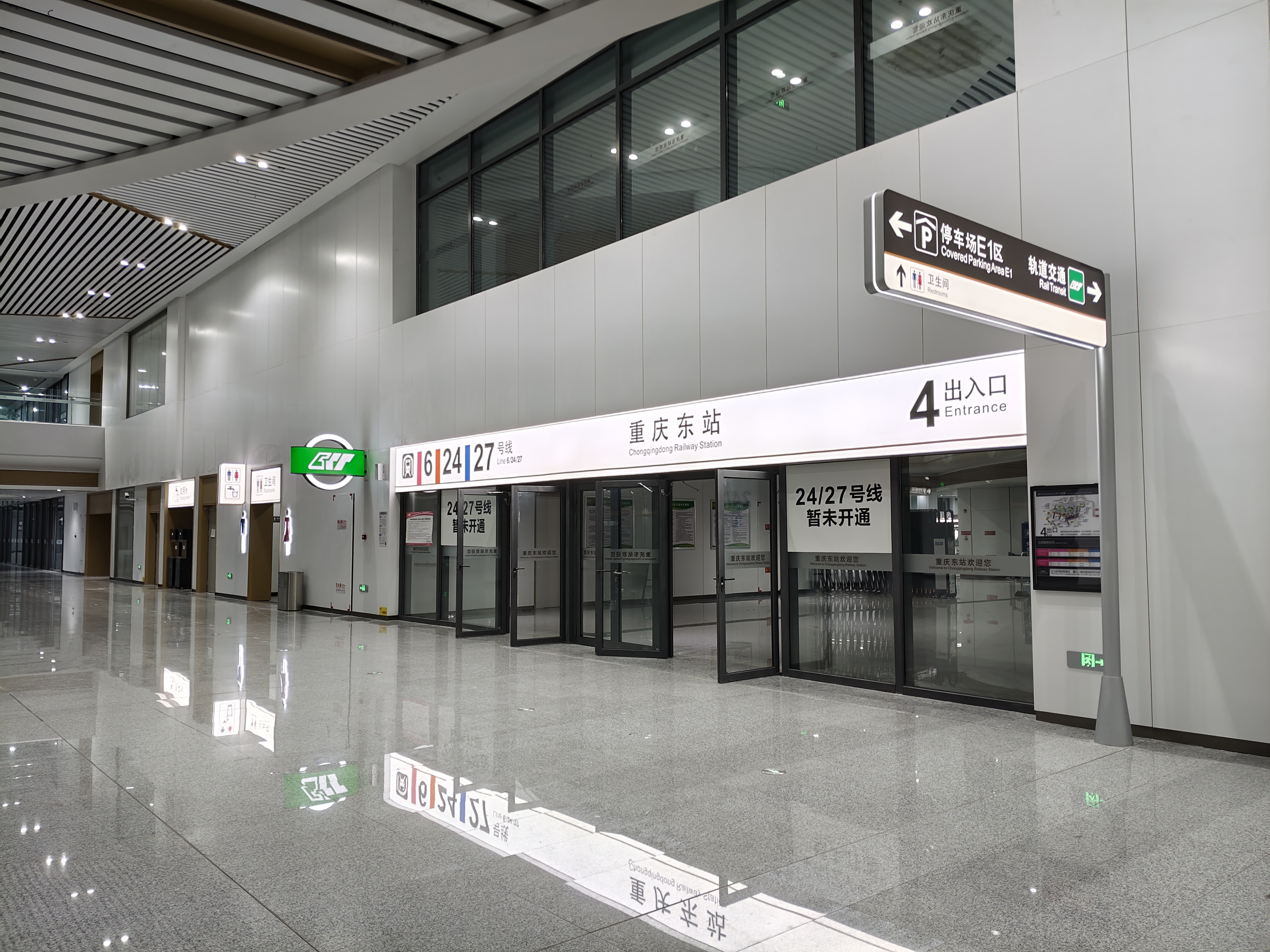
- Entrance 4

General information
- Location: Chongqingdong Railway Station; Nan'an District, Chongqing; China
- Coordinates: 29°29′16″N 106°40′04″E
- System: Chongqing Rail Transit
- Operator: Chongqing Rail Transit Operation Co., Ltd.
- Lines: Line 6 Line 24 (U/C); Line 27 (U/C)
- Platforms: 2 (1 island platform)
- Tracks: 2
- Connections: COE

Construction
- Structure type: Underground
- Accessible: Yes

Other information
- Station code: /

History
- Opened: 27 June 2025

Services
Preceding station	Chongqing Rail Transit	Following station
Terminus	Line 6 Chongqingdong branch	Taohuaqiao towards Liujiaping
Location

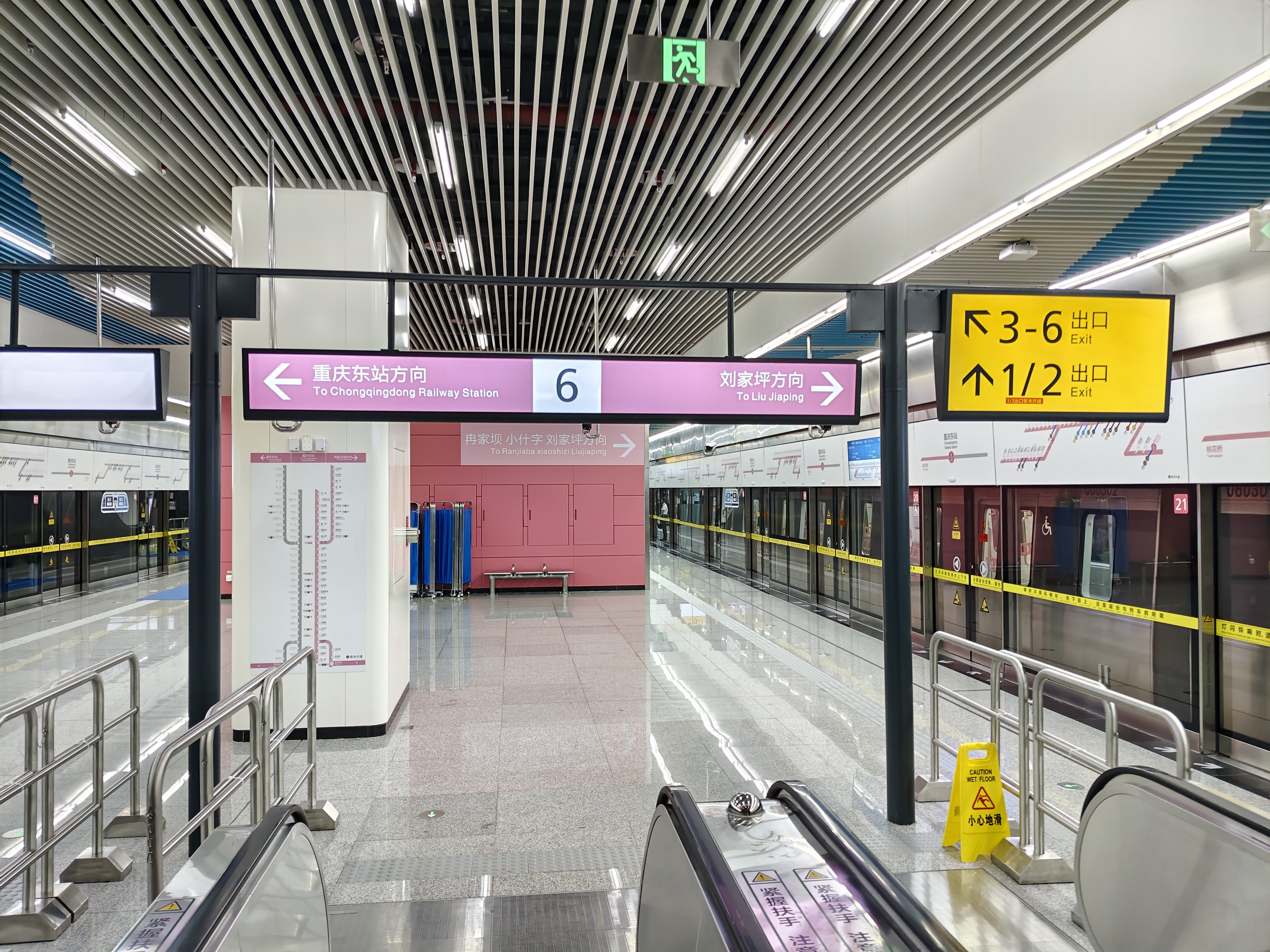
Platform for Line 6

Chongqingdong Railway Station of Chongqing Rail Transit is the metro station beneath the CR station. Line 6, Line 8, Line 24, and Line 27 will stop here. The branch of Line 6 was opened on June 27, 2025. Lines 24 and 27 are under construction, and Line 8 is part of long-term planning that has not been approved by NDRC.

=== Exits ===
- 3: Chongqingdong Railway station (exit-only)
- 4: Bus, Parking E
- 5: Bus, Parking F & H
- 6: Parking G

== Development ==
The station area is planned as a transit-oriented development (TOD) zone, with hotels, office buildings, shopping centers, and cultural facilities. It is a strategic hub in the national "Eight Vertical and Eight Horizontal" high-speed railway network, enhancing connectivity between western and eastern regions of China.

Expected travel times after full completion include:

- About 1 hour to Wanzhou, Qianjiang, Chengdu, and Guiyang
- About 3 hours to Wuhan, Kunming, and Changsha
- About 6 hours to Beijing, Shanghai, and Guangzhou

== Gallery ==
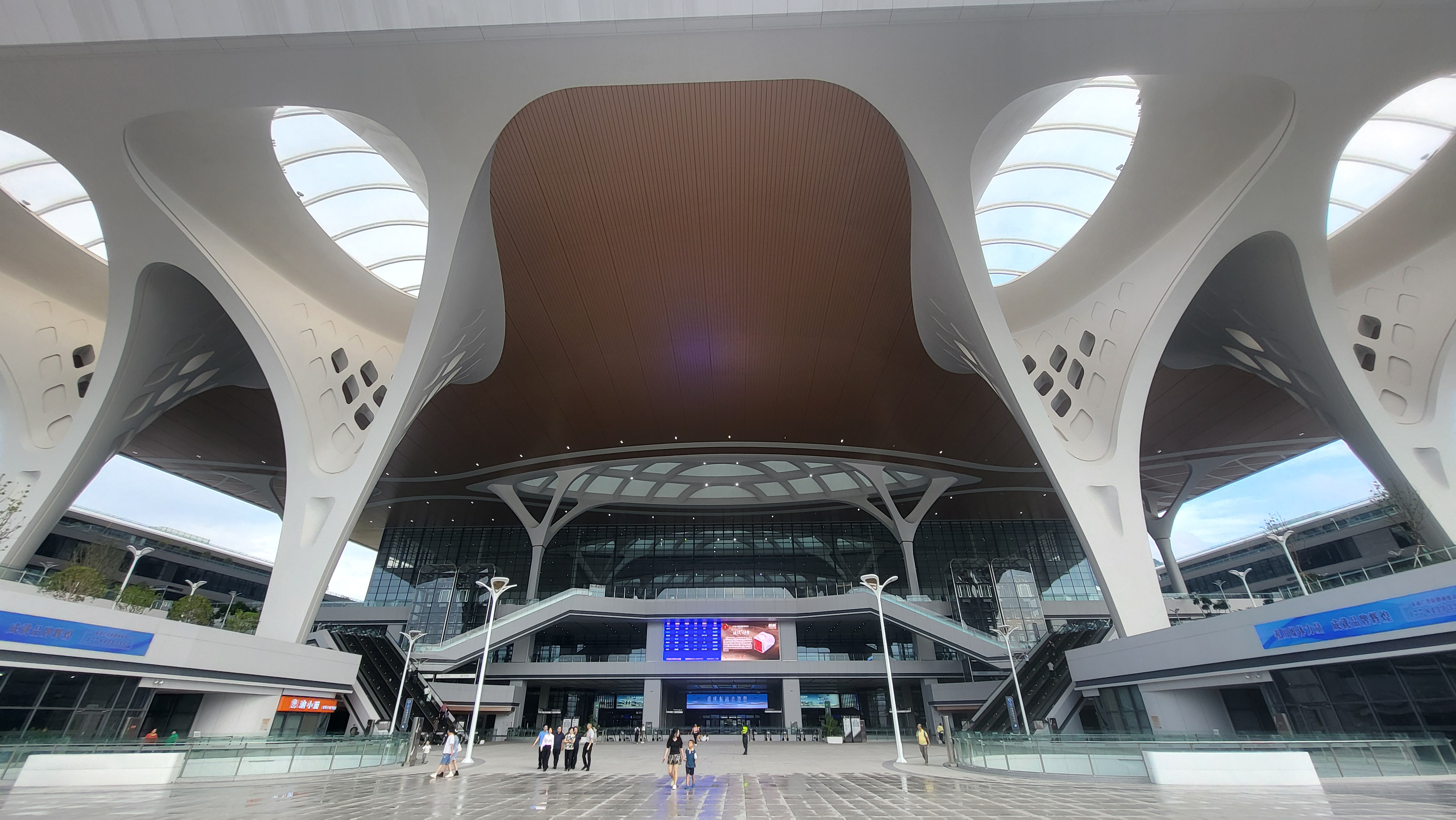
Main entrance

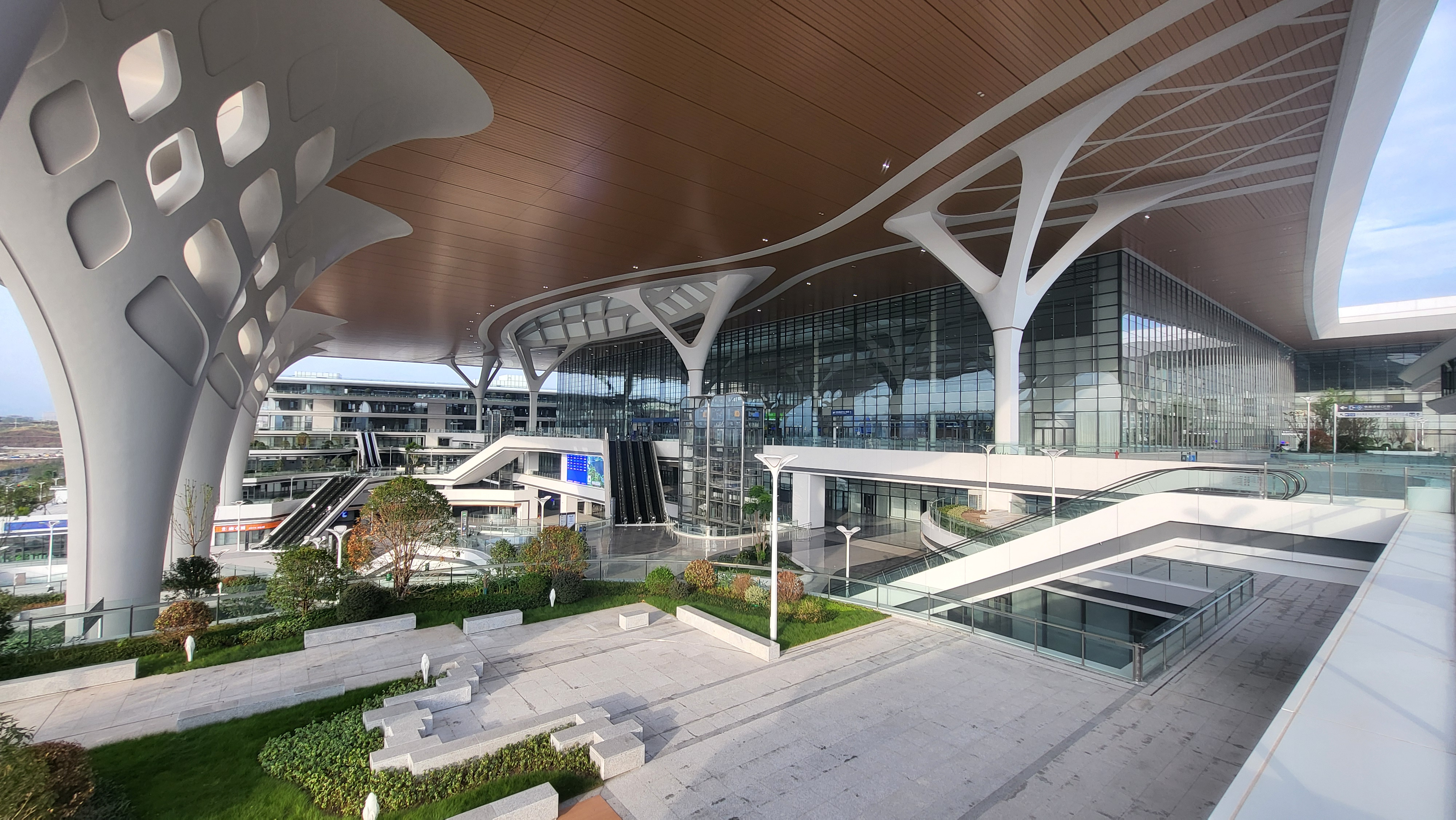
Main entrance from the side

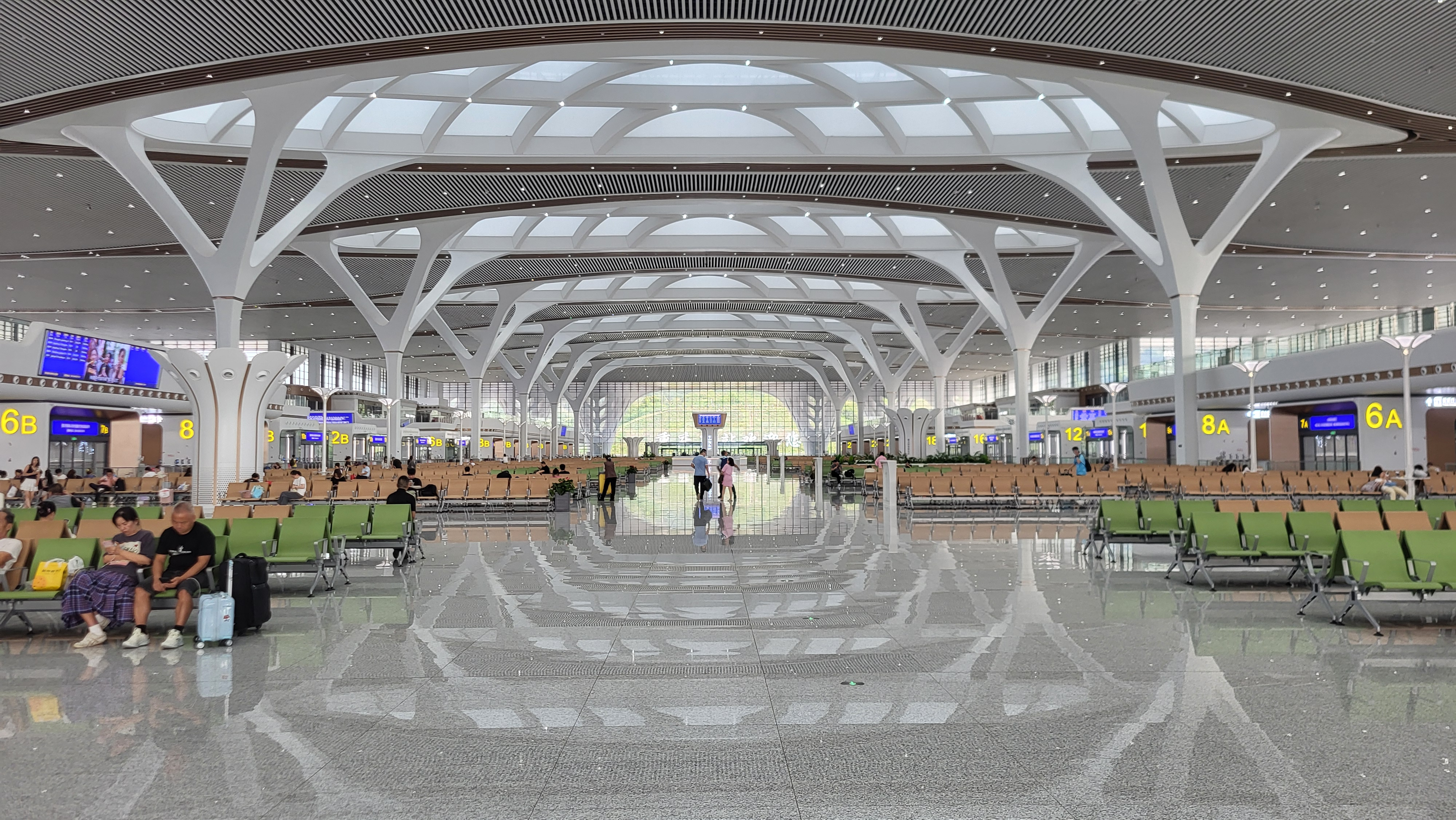
Waiting hall

== See also ==
- Nagoya station - previously the world's largest station
- Chongqing railway station
- Chongqing North railway station
- Chongqing West railway station
- Chongqing Rail Transit
- China Railway Chengdu Group
