= Wanzhou, Chongqing =

Wanzhou 万州区
- District
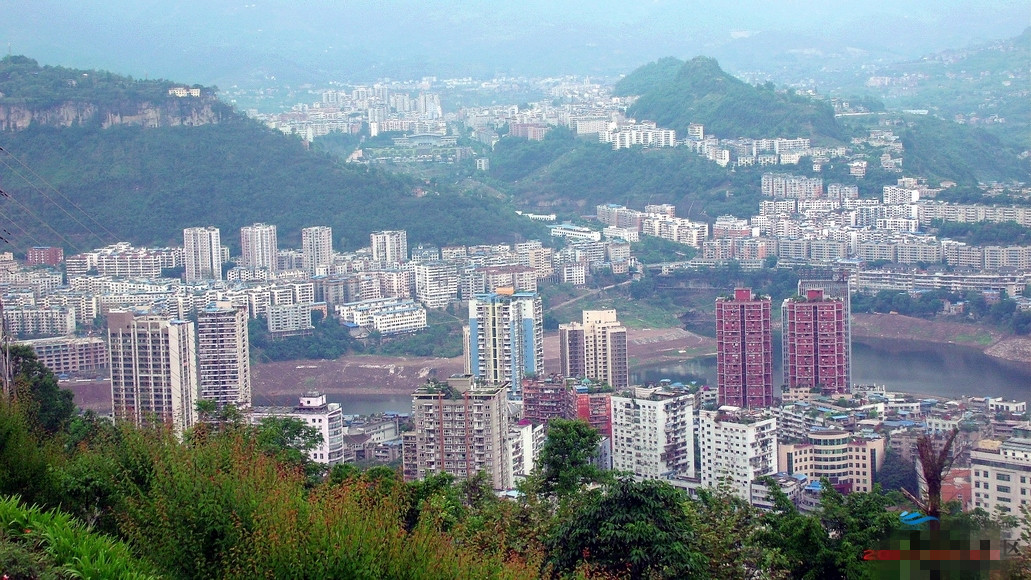

- Wanzhou District in Chongqing
- Coordinates: 30°48′27″N 108°24′31″E
- Country: People's Republic of China
- Municipality: Chongqing

Area
  - District: 3,457 km^{2} (1,335 sq mi)
  - Urban: 80 km^{2} (31 sq mi)

Population (2013)
  - District: 1,753,500
  - Density: 507.2/km^{2} (1,314/sq mi)
  - Urban (2018): 700,000
- Time zone: UTC+8 (China Standard)
- GDP: 2013
- Total: CNY 70.23 billion (US$ 11.46 billion)
- Per capita: CNY 43,197 (US$ 7,047)
- Licence plate prefix: 渝F
- Website: wz.gov.cn

Wanzhou District (Chinese: 万州区; pinyin: Wànzhōu Qū) is Chongqing's second most populated urban core area on the upper reaches of the Three Gorges of the Yangtze River in China. It is currently governed as a district of Chongqing Municipality, bordering Sichuan to the northwest and Hubei to the southeast. It was formerly known as Wanxian or Wan County (simplified Chinese: 万县; traditional Chinese: 萬縣; pinyin: Wànxiàn). Prior to Chongqing's formation as a direct-controlled municipality, Wanzhou was part of Sichuan province. The urban core of Wanzhou is 228 km (142 mi) away from Chongqing's city proper.

The characters for "Wanzhou" mean "myriad-prefecture"; which is derived from the phrase "the place where myriad rivers converge and myriad traders gather" (万川毕汇、万商云集). Due to the construction of the Three Gorges Dam, 47% of Wanzhou's old urban area was submerged and had to be relocated.

== History ==
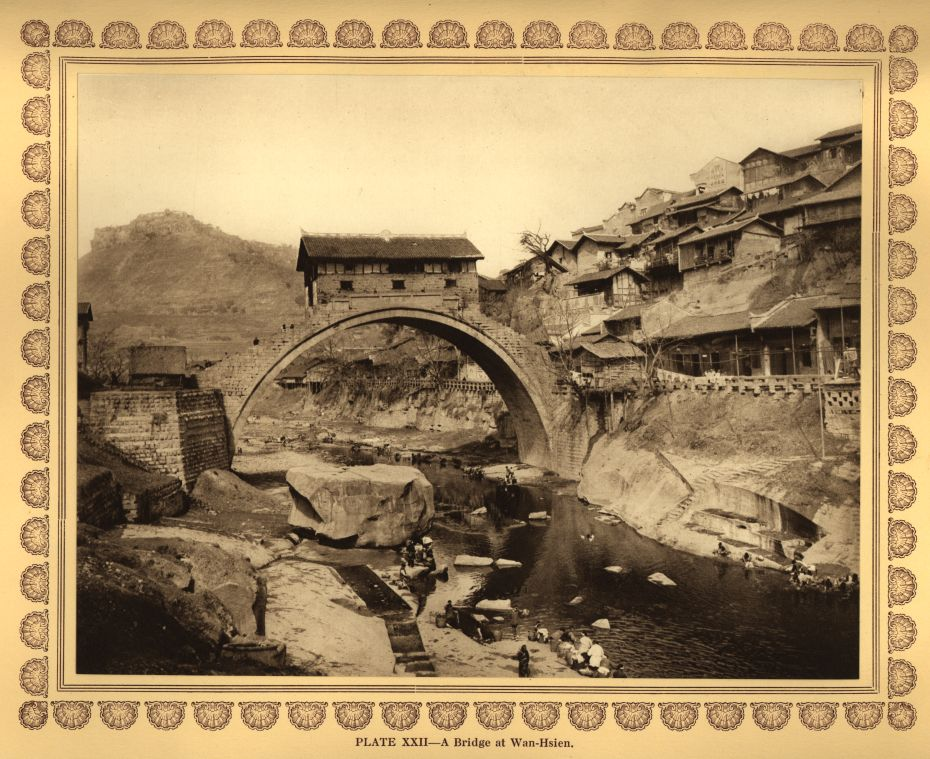
An old stone bridge

The district was part of Wanxian Prefecture (万县地区), then the prefectural Wanxian City (万县市). It was renamed to Wanzhou in late 1990s.

It was part of Quren County of Ba Commandery (巴郡朐忍县) in the Qin dynasty. It became Yangqu County (羊渠县) in 216 (the Eastern Han dynasty). In 230 (the Shu-Han Kingdom), it was renamed to Nanpu (南浦县); in 553 (the Western Wei dynasty), to Yuquan (鱼泉县); in 557 (Northern Zhou dynasty), to Anxiang (安乡县); in 584, to Wanchuan (万川县); and in 598 (Sui dynasty), to Nanpu again.

In 619 (Tang dynasty), Nanpu Commandery (南浦郡) was established. In 625, the name was changed to Pu Prefecture (浦州), and in 634, to Wan Prefecture (万州; Wànzhōu). In 1373 (Yuan dynasty), Wan was demoted to a county (万县; Wànxiàn).

In the 19th century, it was known in English as Wanhsien and Wan County. In 1935, it became Wanxian Prefecture (万县专区). On 12 December 1992, the State Council abolished Wanxian Prefecture and its subordinate Wanxian City and created the prefecture-level Wanxian City, which administered the districts of Longbao (龙宝区), Tiancheng (天城区), Wuqiao (五桥区) and the counties of Kai, Zhong, Liangping, Yunyang, Fengjie, Wushan, Wuxi, and Chengkou.

The entire Wanxian City was merged into Chongqing on 20 December 1997. The merge necessitated the abolishment of Wanxian City and creation of Wanxian District and Wanxian Migration Development Area (移民开发区). Wanxian City's three districts were converted to administrative committees (管理委员会, abbreviated 管委会) of Wanxian District. The migration development area included the counties formerly in Wanxian City, except Liangping and Chengkou, which were administered by Chongqing directly.

On 22 May 1998, the State Council approved that the two areas named Wanxian were both renamed to Wanzhou. The migration development area later dissolved and its counties were directly controlled by Chongqing. On 19 July 2000, the district's administrative committees were changed to migration development areas.

== Sports ==
The 26,000-capacity Wanzhou Pailou Sports Stadium is located in Wanzhou. It is used mostly for association football and also sometimes for athletics. One stand is covered with a roof.

== Geography and climate ==
Wanzhou spans 30°24′−31°14′ N latitude and 107°55′−108°53′ E longitude, and is situated at the eastern edge of the Sichuan Basin. It reaches a maximal north–south extent of 67.25 km (41.79 mi) and east–west width of 97.25 km (60.43 mi), covering an area of 3,214 km^{2} (1,241 sq mi). Elevations range from 106 m (348 ft) in the town of Tailong (太龙镇) to 1,762 m (5,781 ft) at Shaping Peak (沙坪峰) of the Qiyao Mountains (齐曜山). Bordering county-level divisions:

- Yunyang County – east
- Shizhu County – south
- Lichuan, Hubei – south
- Zhong County – west
- Liangping County – west
- Kaijiang County, Sichuan – north
- Kai County – north

Similar to the city proper of Chongqing, Wanzhou has a monsoon-humid subtropical climate (Köppen Cwa) with short, mild winters, and very hot, humid summers, and is in fact on average 0.5 °C (0.9 °F) warmer during the day. The monthly 24-hour average temperature ranges from 7.0 °C (44.6 °F) in January to 28.3 °C (82.9 °F) in August, while the annual mean is 17.95 °C (64.3 °F).

Climate data for Wanzhou, elevation 187 m (614 ft), (1991–2020 normals, extremes 1981–2010)
Month	Jan	Feb	Mar	Apr	May	Jun	Jul	Aug	Sep	Oct	Nov	Dec	Year
Record high °C (°F)	19.1 (66.4)	28.0 (82.4)	33.3 (91.9)	36.8 (98.2)	39.5 (103.1)	40.2 (104.4)	41.5 (106.7)	42.3 (108.1)	42.0 (107.6)	35.8 (96.4)	29.1 (84.4)	19.6 (67.3)	42.3 (108.1)
Mean daily maximum °C (°F)	11.0 (51.8)	13.8 (56.8)	18.9 (66.0)	24.3 (75.7)	27.8 (82.0)	30.7 (87.3)	34.4 (93.9)	34.8 (94.6)	29.7 (85.5)	23.4 (74.1)	18.2 (64.8)	12.3 (54.1)	23.3 (73.9)
Daily mean °C (°F)	7.6 (45.7)	9.6 (49.3)	13.8 (56.8)	18.9 (66.0)	22.7 (72.9)	25.8 (78.4)	28.8 (83.8)	28.9 (84.0)	24.6 (76.3)	19.1 (66.4)	14.3 (57.7)	9.2 (48.6)	18.6 (65.5)
Mean daily minimum °C (°F)	5.3 (41.5)	6.8 (44.2)	10.3 (50.5)	15.1 (59.2)	19.1 (66.4)	22.4 (72.3)	24.9 (76.8)	24.7 (76.5)	21.3 (70.3)	16.6 (61.9)	11.9 (53.4)	7.1 (44.8)	15.5 (59.8)
Record low °C (°F)	−2.2 (28.0)	−1.3 (29.7)	−0.1 (31.8)	6.5 (43.7)	11.2 (52.2)	15.4 (59.7)	17.6 (63.7)	18.1 (64.6)	14.3 (57.7)	5.3 (41.5)	2.9 (37.2)	−2.1 (28.2)	−2.2 (28.0)
Average precipitation mm (inches)	16.2 (0.64)	21.7 (0.85)	50.2 (1.98)	96.8 (3.81)	172.0 (6.77)	184.5 (7.26)	180.2 (7.09)	146.0 (5.75)	141.2 (5.56)	102.7 (4.04)	53.7 (2.11)	17.9 (0.70)	1,183.1 (46.56)
Average precipitation days (≥ 0.1 mm)	7.9	7.5	10.5	13.2	15.5	14.5	11.9	10.5	11.8	13.5	9.8	7.7	134.3
Average snowy days	0.3	0.1	0	0	0	0	0	0	0	0	0	0.1	0.5
Average relative humidity (%)	81	78	75	77	78	80	75	72	77	83	83	83	79
Mean monthly sunshine hours	27.1	38.6	84.9	118.0	116.4	118.9	186.7	198.8	123.8	74.6	53.1	27.2	1,168.1
Percentage possible sunshine	8	12	23	30	27	28	44	49	34	21	17	9	25
Source 1: China Meteorological Administration
Source 2: Weather China

Climate data for Wanzhou (Tiancheng District), elevation 257 m (843 ft), (1991–2020 normals)
Month	Jan	Feb	Mar	Apr	May	Jun	Jul	Aug	Sep	Oct	Nov	Dec	Year
Mean daily maximum °C (°F)	10.5 (50.9)	13.3 (55.9)	18.4 (65.1)	23.9 (75.0)	27.4 (81.3)	30.2 (86.4)	34.0 (93.2)	34.3 (93.7)	29.2 (84.6)	22.8 (73.0)	17.7 (63.9)	11.7 (53.1)	22.8 (73.0)
Daily mean °C (°F)	7.0 (44.6)	9.1 (48.4)	13.2 (55.8)	18.3 (64.9)	22.1 (71.8)	25.1 (77.2)	28.1 (82.6)	28.1 (82.6)	23.9 (75.0)	18.5 (65.3)	13.7 (56.7)	8.6 (47.5)	18.0 (64.4)
Mean daily minimum °C (°F)	4.7 (40.5)	6.3 (43.3)	9.6 (49.3)	14.4 (57.9)	18.4 (65.1)	21.6 (70.9)	24.2 (75.6)	23.8 (74.8)	20.5 (68.9)	15.8 (60.4)	11.2 (52.2)	6.4 (43.5)	14.7 (58.5)
Average precipitation mm (inches)	17.9 (0.70)	22.4 (0.88)	53.6 (2.11)	102.6 (4.04)	180.7 (7.11)	195.9 (7.71)	186.7 (7.35)	149.1 (5.87)	148.9 (5.86)	110.3 (4.34)	58.6 (2.31)	18.7 (0.74)	1,245.4 (49.02)
Average precipitation days (≥ 0.1 mm)	8.5	7.8	10.8	14.1	15.4	14.8	12.7	11.1	11.9	14.1	10.6	8.6	140.4
Average snowy days	0.5	0.1	0	0	0	0	0	0	0	0	0	0.1	0.7
Average relative humidity (%)	82	79	77	79	80	82	79	75	80	85	85	85	81
Mean monthly sunshine hours	28.9	40.4	84.9	115.0	111.4	110.3	177.1	193.8	119.0	70.8	55.2	28.6	1,135.4
Percentage possible sunshine	9	13	23	30	26	26	41	48	32	20	18	9	25
Source: China Meteorological Administration

== Subdivisions ==
The 4 primary subdivisions were 3 migration development areas (Longbao, Tiancheng, Wuqiao) and Jiangnan New District (江南新区). Now Wanzhou is subdivided into 92 township divisions are 16 sub-districts, 33 towns, and 43 townships (see Administrative divisions of the People's Republic of China#Levels). In 2000, the district included 32 towns, 45 townships, 14 sub-districts, and 1277 neighborhood and village committees.

Name	Chinese (S)	Hanyu Pinyin	Population (2010)	Area (km^{2})
Gaosuntang Subdistrict	高笋塘街道	Gāosǔntáng Jiēdào	103,982	3
Taibai Subdistrict	太白街道	Tàibái Jiēdào	108,387	13.1
Pailou Subdistrict	牌楼街道	Páilóu Jiēdào	104,351	9.8
Shuanghekou Subdistrict	双河口街道	Shuānghékǒu Jiēdào	33,715	23
Longdu Subdistrict	龙都街道	Lóngdōu Jiēdào	36,134	24
Zhoujiaba Subdistrict	周家坝街道	Zhōujiābà Jiēdào	88,494	12
Shahe Subdistrict	沙河街道	Shāhé Jiēdào	24,915	11.2
Zhonggulou Subdistrict	钟鼓楼街道	Zhōnggǔlóu Jiēdào	85,873	38.7
Bai'anba Subdistrict	百安坝街道	Bǎi'ānbà Jiēdào	91,947	15.8
Wuqiao Subdistrict	五桥街道	Wǔqiáo Jiēdào	20,672	25.7
Chenjiaba Subdistrict	陈家坝街道	Chénjiābà Jiēdào	24,745	34.75
Xiaozhou town	小周镇	Xiǎozhōu Zhèn	9,136	49
Dazhou town	大周镇	Dàzhōu Zhèn	12,184	64
Xinxiang town	新乡镇	Xīnxiāng Zhèn	6,683	140.2
Sunjia town	孙家镇	Sūnjiā Zhèn	9,737	46.6
Gaofeng town	高峰镇	Gāofēng Zhèn	19,550	46.2
Longsha town	龙沙镇	Lóngshā Zhèn	28,127	25
Xiangshui town	响水镇	Xiǎngshuǐ Zhèn	16,889	59.5
Wuling town	武陵镇	Wǔlíng Zhèn	24,632	34.4
Rangdu town	瀼渡镇	Ràngdù Zhèn	11,613	30.7
Ganning town	甘宁镇	Gānníng Zhèn	30,873	104.8
Tiancheng town	天城镇	Tiānchéng Zhèn	41,762	52.4
Xiongjia town	熊家镇	Xióngjiā Zhèn	33,176	82.5
Gaoliang town	高梁镇	Gāoliáng Zhèn	49,357	37.7
Lihe town	李河镇	Lǐhé Zhèn	23,264	38.7
Fenshui town	分水镇	Fēnshuǐ Zhèn	60,308	220.96
Yujia town	余家镇	Yújiā Zhèn	30,454	78.2
Houshan town	后山镇	Hòushān Zhèn	15,338	78.86
Danzi town	弹子镇	Dànzǐ Zhèn	18,318	54.6
Changling town	长岭镇	Zhǎnglǐng Zhèn	34,962	53.2
Xintian town	新田镇	Xīntián Zhèn	34,145	104.4
Baiyang town	白羊镇	Báiyáng Zhèn	38,078	34.4
Longju town	龙驹镇	Lóngjū Zhèn	31,982	241.5
Zouma town	走马镇	Zǒumǎ Zhèn	26,017	76.5
Luotian town	罗田镇	Luōtián Zhèn	27,669	81.7
Tailong town	太龙镇	Tàilóng Zhèn	14,148	63
Changtan town	长滩镇	Chángtān Zhèn	17,904	101.3
Tai'an town	太安镇	Tài'ān Zhèn	19,583	47.2
Baitu town	白土镇	Báitǔ Zhèn	16,790	54.6
Guocun town	郭村镇	Guōcūn Zhèn	21,326	24.4
Zhushan Township	柱山乡	Zhùshān Xiāng	16,331	53.9
Tiefeng Township	铁峰乡	Tiěfēng Xiāng	7,934	50
Xikou Township	溪口乡	Xīkǒu Xiāng	5,695	39.2
Changping Township	长坪乡	Chángpíng Xiāng	8,580	44.3
Yanshan Township	燕山乡	Yànshān Xiāng	9,845	56.4
Lishu Township	梨树乡	Líshù Xiāng	6,116	51.02
Puzi Township	普子乡	Pǔzi Xiāng	8,295	85.7
Huangbo Township	黄柏乡	Huángbò Xiāng	10,949	31
Jiuchi Township	九池乡	Jiǔchí Xiāng	17,705	21.5
Cizhu Township	茨竹乡	Cízhú Xiāng	5,272	37.8
Debao Tujia Ethnic Township	地宝土家族乡	Debǎo Tǔjiāzú Xiāng	5,502	44.4
Henghe Tujia Ethnic Township	恒合土家族乡	Hénghé Tǔjiāzú Xiāng	13,606	81.9

== Colleges and universities ==
- Chongqing Three Gorges University (重庆三峡学院)
- Chongqing Three Gorges Medical College (重庆三峡医药高等专科学校)
- Chongqing Three Gorges Polytechnic College (重庆三峡职业学院)
- Chongqing Information Technology College (重庆信息技术职业学院)
- Chongqing Preschool Education College (重庆幼儿师范高等专科学校)
- Chongqing Vocational Institute of Safety & Technology (重庆安全技术职业学院)
- Chongqing Science And Technology Career Academy (重庆科技职业学院)

== Transport ==
Wanzhou has three Yangtze River crossings. It has two railway stations: Wanzhou North offers high-speed service and Wanzhou offers infrequent conventional services.

- China National Highway 318
- Wanzhou Wuqiao Airport

== Gallery ==
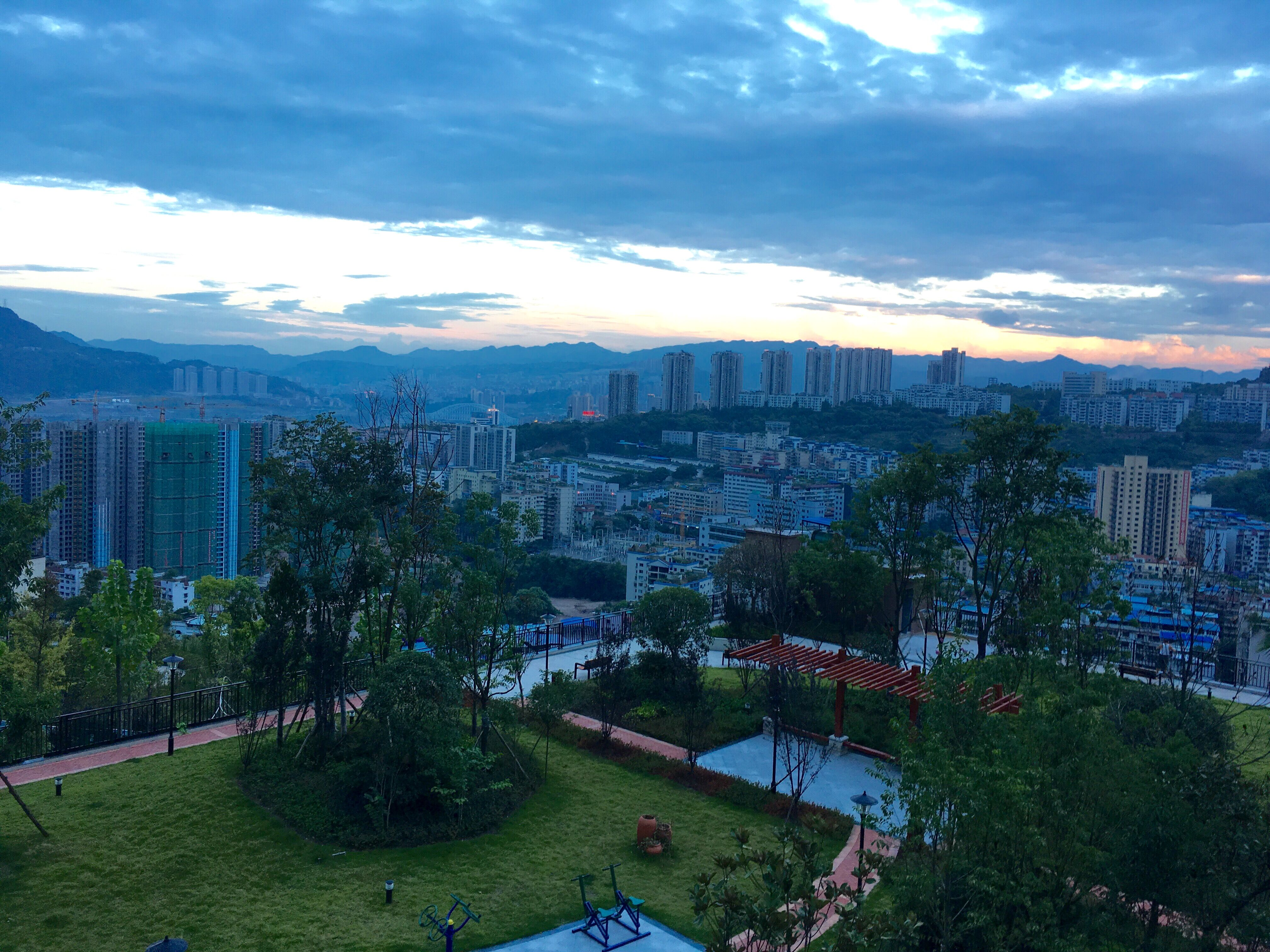
View of Wanzhou

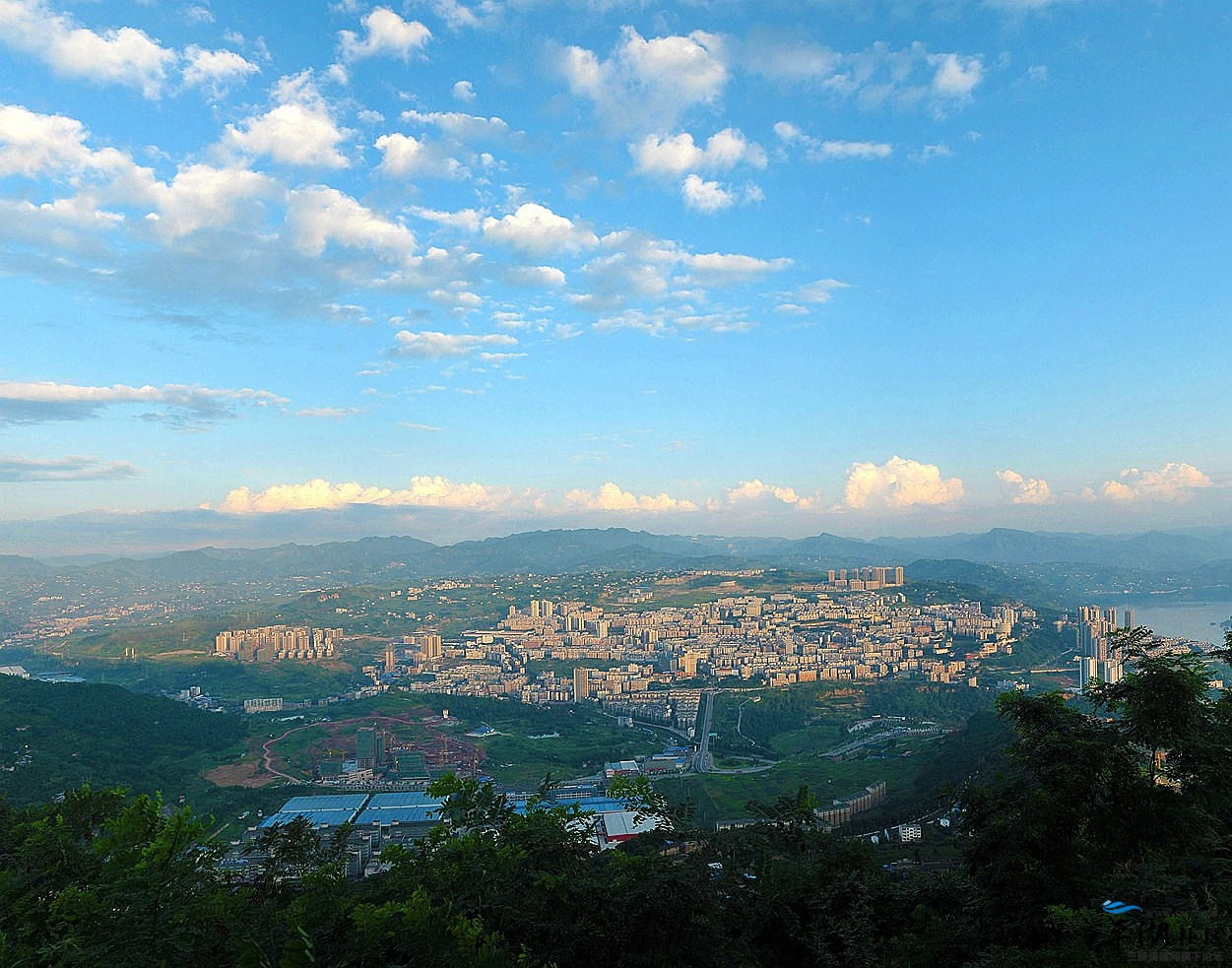
Wanzhou panorama

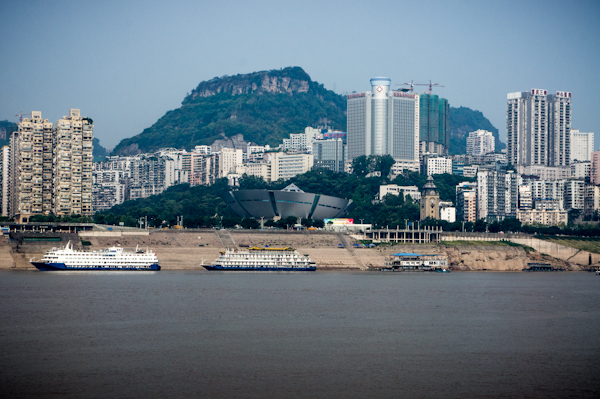
View of Wanzhou across the river

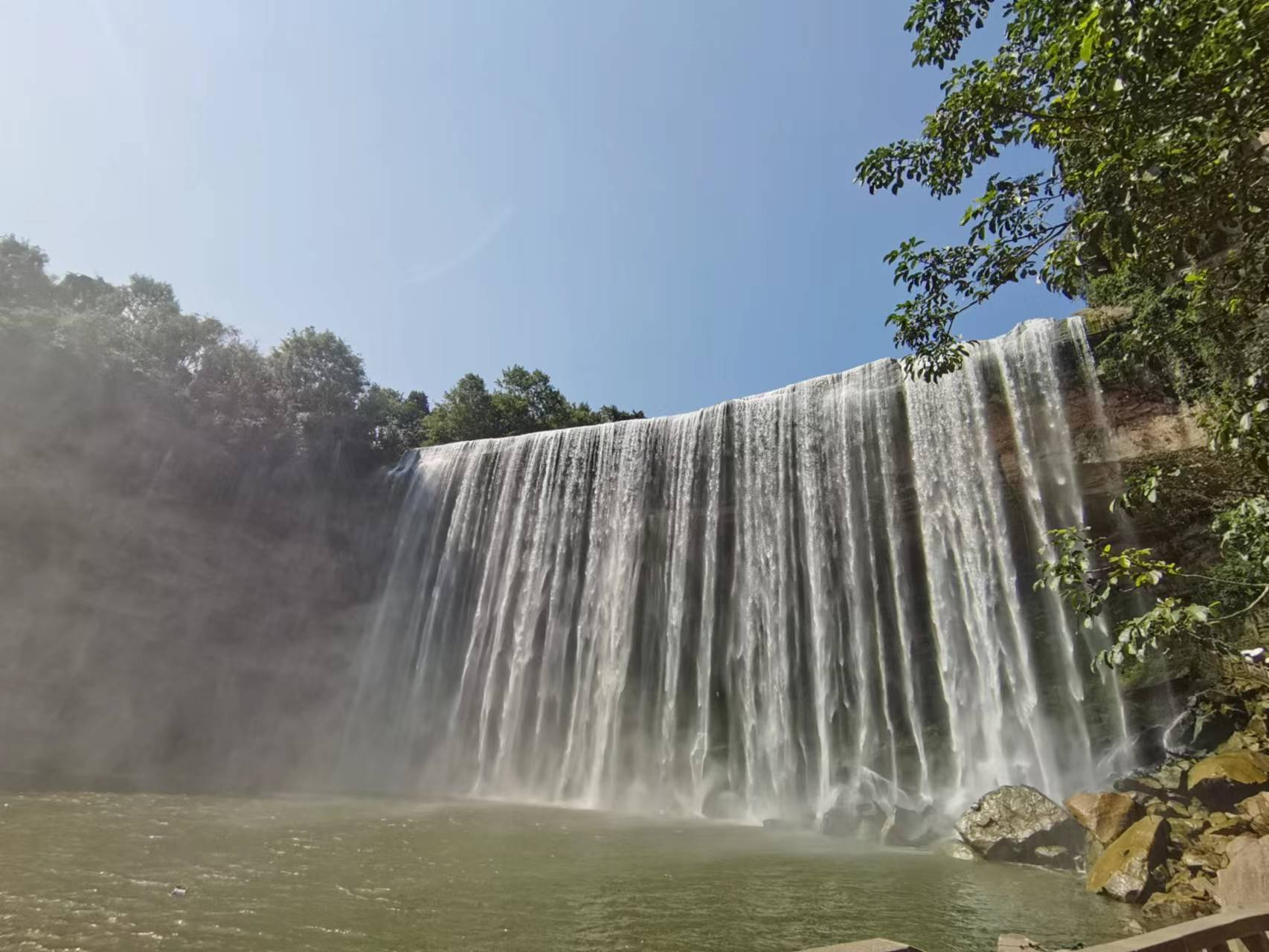
Wanzhou waterfall

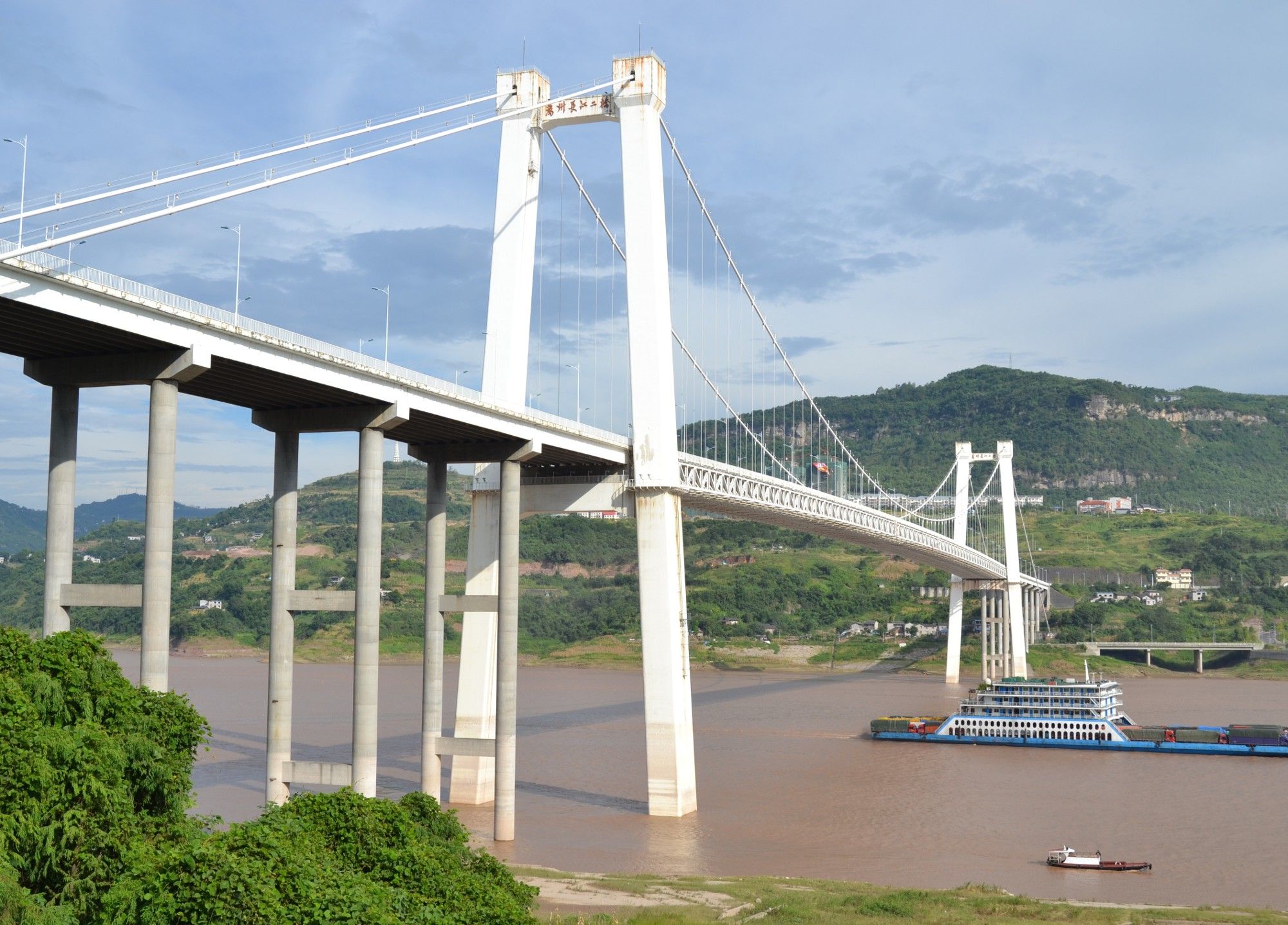
Second Wanzhou Yangtze Bridge

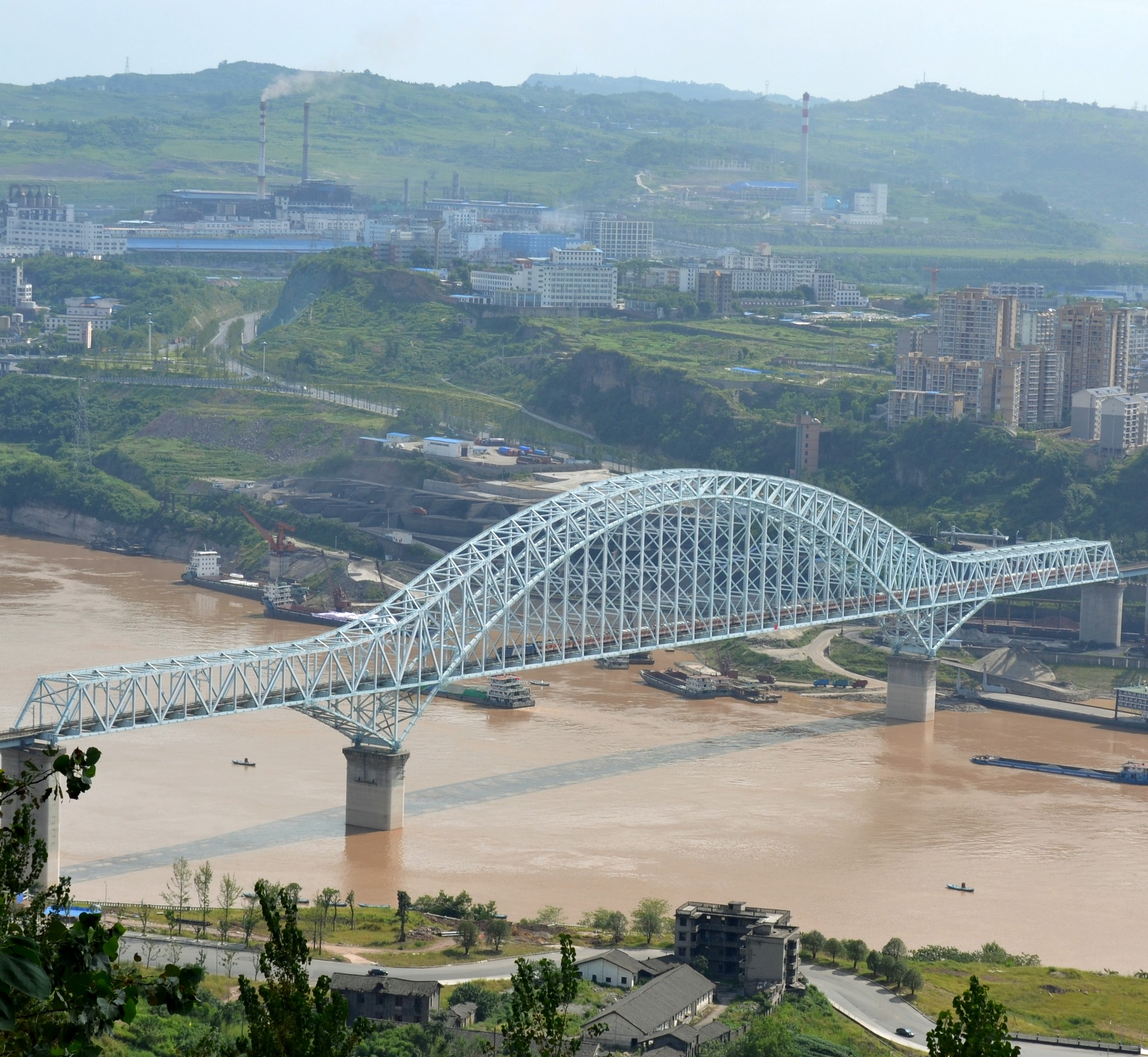
Wanzhou Yangtze River Railway Bridge
