= Suining–Chengdu railway =

Railway line in Sichuan, China

Suining–Chengdu railway Suining-Chengdu section of the Shanghai–Wuhan–Chengdu passenger railway corridor

Overview
- Native name: 遂成铁路
- Status: Operational
- Owner: CR Chengdu
- Termini: Suining; Chengdu East

Service
- Type: Heavy rail High-speed rail Freight rail
- System: China Railway High-speed
- Operator(s): CR Chengdu

Technical
- Line length: 146 km (91 mi)
- Number of tracks: 2
- Track gauge: 1,435 mm (4 ft 8 1/2 in) standard gauge
- Electrification: 25 kV 50 Hz AC (Overhead line)
- Operating speed: 200 km/h (124 mph)

The Suining–Chengdu railway or Suicheng railway (simplified Chinese: 遂成铁路; traditional Chinese: 遂成鐵路; pinyin: Suì chéng tiělù) is a double-track, electrified railway in Sichuan Province of southwest China. The railway is named after its two terminal cities, Suining and Chengdu, and forms a segment of the Shanghai–Wuhan–Chengdu passenger railway. It was built as part of the Dazhou–Chengdu Railway. A second, more direct track was opened on the Chengdu–Suining section of that line on 1 April 2006 that allows trains to reach a top speed of 200 km/h (124 mph). On 7 July 2009, the high-speed track was duplicated and these two tracks were subsequently designated as the Suining–Chengdu railway. The original low-speed, single track line between Chengdu and Suining remains as part of the Dazhou–Chengdu railway and is now mainly used for freight traffic.
