= Tongnan railway station =

Railway station in Chongqing, China

Tongnan 潼南
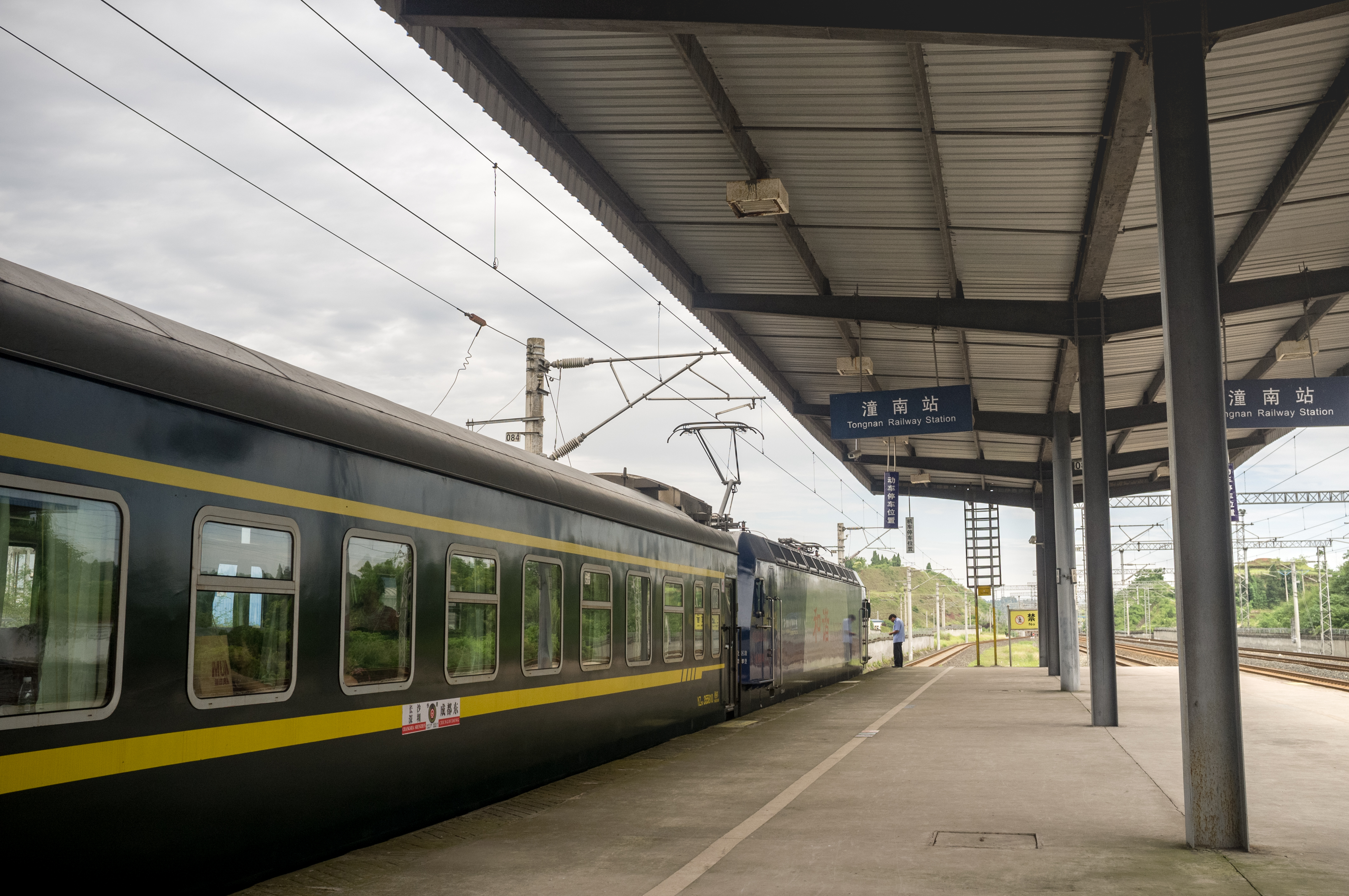
- Passenger Train K488 at Tongnan Railway Station

General information
- Location: Tongnan District, Chongqing; China
- Coordinates: 30.2224°N 105.8740°E
- Operated by: China Railway Corporation
- Line: Suiyu railway

History
- Opened: 22 October 2006
Location

Tongnan railway station is a railway station located in Tongnan District, Chongqing, People's Republic of China, on the Suiyu railway which is operated by the China Railway Corporation.

== History ==
The station opened on 22 October 2006.
