= Dazhou railway station =

Railway station in Dazhou, Sichuan

Dazhou 达州
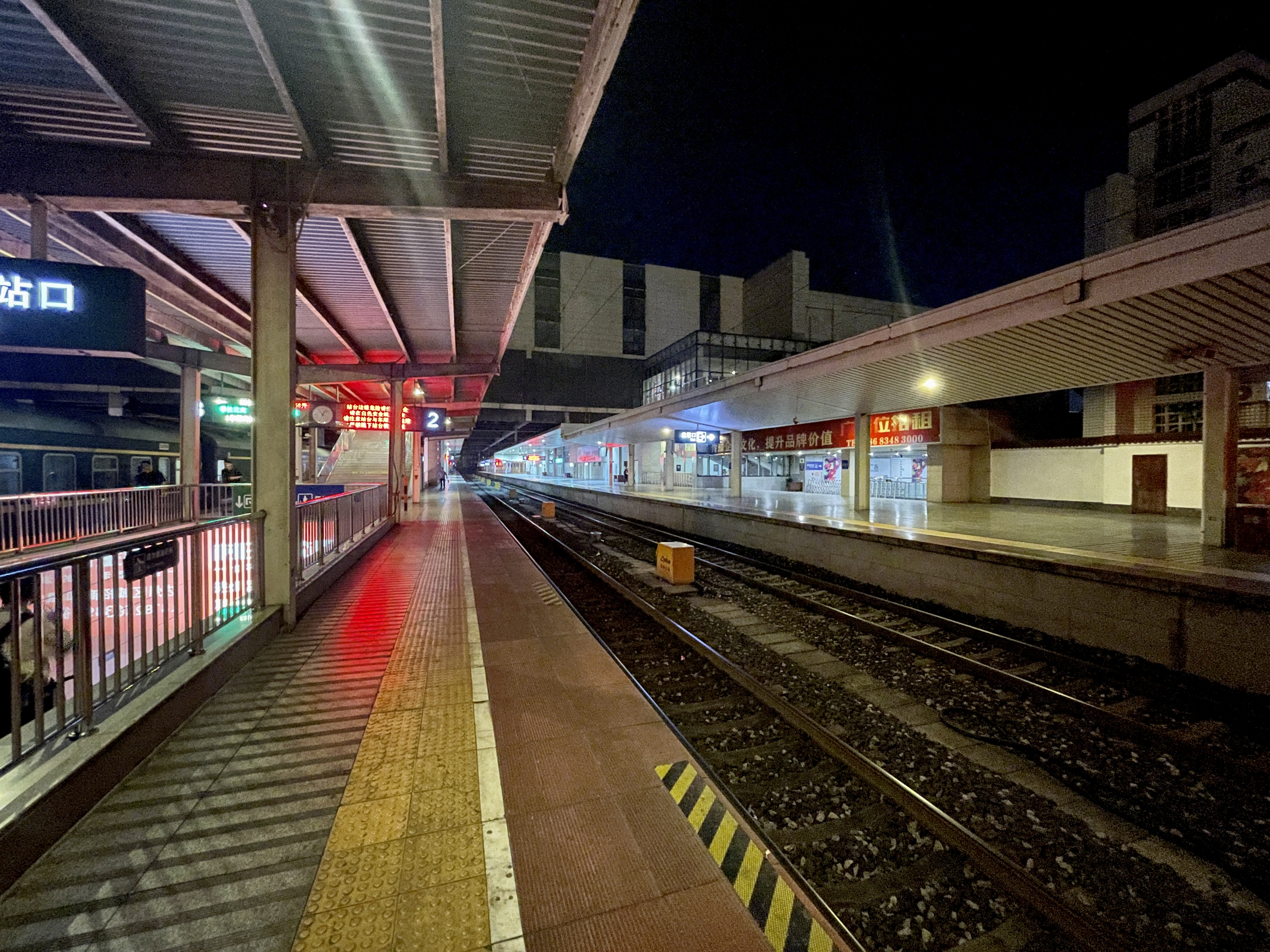
- Dazhou Station

General information
- Location: Tongchuan District, Dazhou, Sichuan; China
- Coordinates: 31°11′55″N 107°27′09″E
- Line(s): Xiangyang–Chongqing railway; Dazhou–Chengdu railway; Dazhou–Wanzhou railway

Dazhou railway station (Chinese: 达州站) is a railway station in Tongchuan District, Dazhou, Sichuan, China. It is an intermediate stop on the Xiangyang–Chongqing railway and the terminus of the Dazhou–Chengdu railway and Dazhou–Wanzhou railway.

Preceding station	China Railway	Following station
Xuanhan towards Xiangyang	Xiangyang–Chongqing railway	Dushi towards Chongqing
Terminus	Dazhou–Chengdu railway	Dushi towards Chengdu
