= China Railway CRH1 =

Chinese high-speed train

China Railway CRH1 EMU
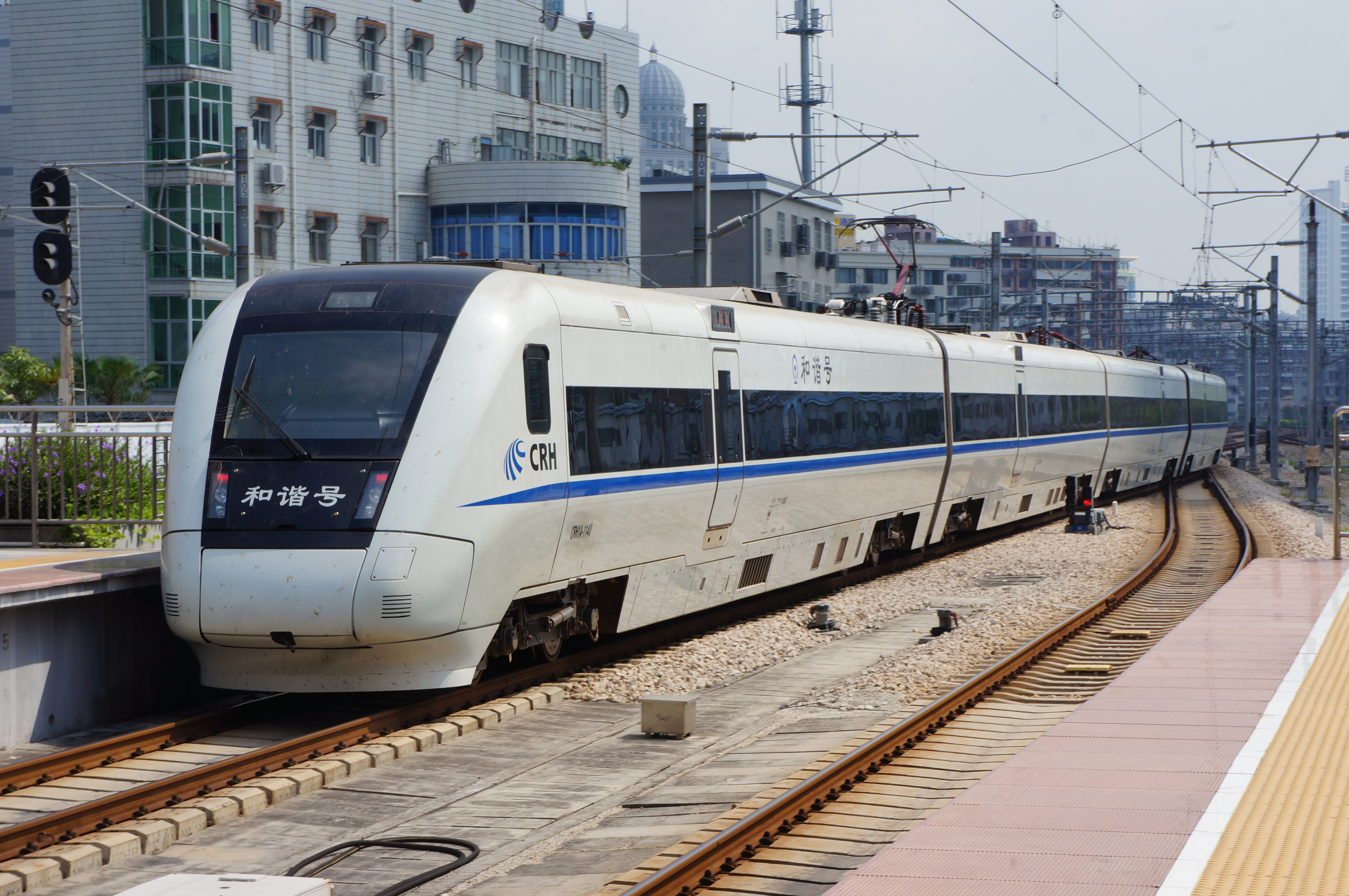
- CRH1A at Xiamen railway station
- In service: 1 February 2007–present
- Manufacturers: Bombardier Sifang (Qingdao) Transportation Ltd. (Bombardier Transportation and CSR Sifang)
- Family name: CRH1A/B: Regina; CRH1E, CRH1A–A/E–NG and CRH380D: Zefiro
- Replaced: X 2000 "Xinshisu", DJJ1 "Blue Arrow", DJF2 "Pioneer"
- Number built: CRH1A: 128 trainsets (1024 cars); CRH1A–A: 87 trainsets (696 cars); CRH1B: 24 trainsets (384 cars); CRH1E: 15 trainsets (240 cars); CRH1E–NG: 5 trainsets (80 cars); CRH380D: 85 trainsets (680 cars)
- Number scrapped: 1 trainset (4 cars; derailment)
- Successor: CR300AF, CR300BF
- Formation: CRH1A/A–A: eight cars per trainset (5M3T); CRH1B/E/E–NG: 16 cars per trainset (10M6T); CRH380D: eight cars per trainset (4M4T)
- Capacity: CRH1A: 668 or 611 or 646 or 635; CRH1A–A: 613; CRH1B: 1299; CRH1E/E–NG: 618 or 642; CRH380D: 495
- Operators: China Railway: CR Guangzhou; CR Shanghai; CR Nanchang; CR Chengdu
- Lines served: High speed and major conventional rail lines in southern China

Specifications
- Car body construction: CRH1A/B and first-generation CRH1E: Stainless steel CRH1A–A, CRH1E–NG and CRH380D: Aluminium alloy
- Train length: CRH1A: 213.5 m (700 ft 6 in); CRH1A–A: 207.9 m (682 ft 1 in); CRH1B: 426.3 m (1,398 ft 7 in); CRH1E: 428.9 m (1,407 ft 2 in); CRH1E–NG: 413.1 m (1,355 ft 4 in); CRH380D: 215.3 m (706 ft 4 in)
- Platform height: 500–1,250 mm (1 ft 7.7 in – 4 ft 1.2 in)
- Maximum speed: CRH1A:200 km/h (124 mph)or 250 km/h (155 mph); CRH1A–A/B/E/E–NG:250 km/h (155 mph); CRH380D: 380 km/h (236 mph)
- Weight: CRH1A/A–A:435 t (428 long tons; 480 short tons); CRH1B:850 t (837 long tons; 937 short tons); CRH1E/E–NG:890 t (876 long tons; 981 short tons); CRH380D:450 t (443 long tons; 496 short tons)
- Traction system: Water-cooled IGBT-VVVF inverter control (Bombardier MITRAC 1000)
- Traction motors: 3-phase AC induction motor (Bombardier DR-1200 [CRH1A] or DR-1500 [CRH1B/E])
- Power output: CRH1A: 5.3 MW (7,107 hp); CRH1A–A: 5.5 MW (7,376 hp); CRH1B/E/E–NG: 11 MW (14,751 hp); CRH380D: 10 MW (13,410 hp)
- Transmission: AC-DC-AC
- Acceleration: CRH1A/B/E:Maximum 0.6 m/s^{2} (1.3 mph/s); CRH380D: 0.48 m/s^{2} (1.1 mph/s)
- Deceleration: CRH1A:Emergency 1.2 m/s^{2} (2.7 mph/s); General 0.8 m/s^{2} (1.8 mph/s)
- Electric system: 25 kV 50 Hz AC Overhead catenary
- Current collection: Pantograph
- Braking systems: Regenerative, electronically controlled pneumatic brakes
- Track gauge: 1,435 mm (4 ft 8 1/2 in) standard gauge

The CRH1 is a group of electric multiple units operated by China Railway under the Hexie brand (simplified Chinese: 和谐号; traditional Chinese: 和諧號; pinyin: Héxié Hào; lit. 'Harmony'). The trains were built in Qingdao, Shandong, by Bombardier Sifang (Qingdao) Transportation, a joint venture between Bombardier Transportation and Sifang. The class entered passenger service on 1 February 2007.

Despite the shared CRH1 designation, the trains belong to two substantially different Bombardier design lineages. The CRH1A and CRH1B are derived from the regional Regina C2008, while the original CRH1E sleeper is derived from the Zefiro 250. The division by platform does not coincide exactly with the change in body material: the original CRH1A and CRH1E used stainless-steel carbodies, whereas the later CRH1A-250 (CRH1A–A) and new-generation sleeper designs use aluminium.

The Chinese Ministry of Railways ordered the Regina-based trains for 200 km/h (120 mph) regional intercity services as part of the same procurement programme as the Shinkansen-based CRH2A and Pendolino-based CRH5A. By August 2005, two batches totalling 40 eight-car CRH1 trainsets were on order. In July 2010, a further 40 eight-car CRH1A trains were ordered.

Although the Regina platform originated as a regional train, CRH1-family sets have also worked long-distance services lasting many hours. In April 2017, a daytime sleeper service from Shanghai to Chengdu used a 16-car CRH1E and was scheduled to take 12 hours 58 minutes; the previous fastest journey had taken 14 hours 23 minutes.

== Variants ==
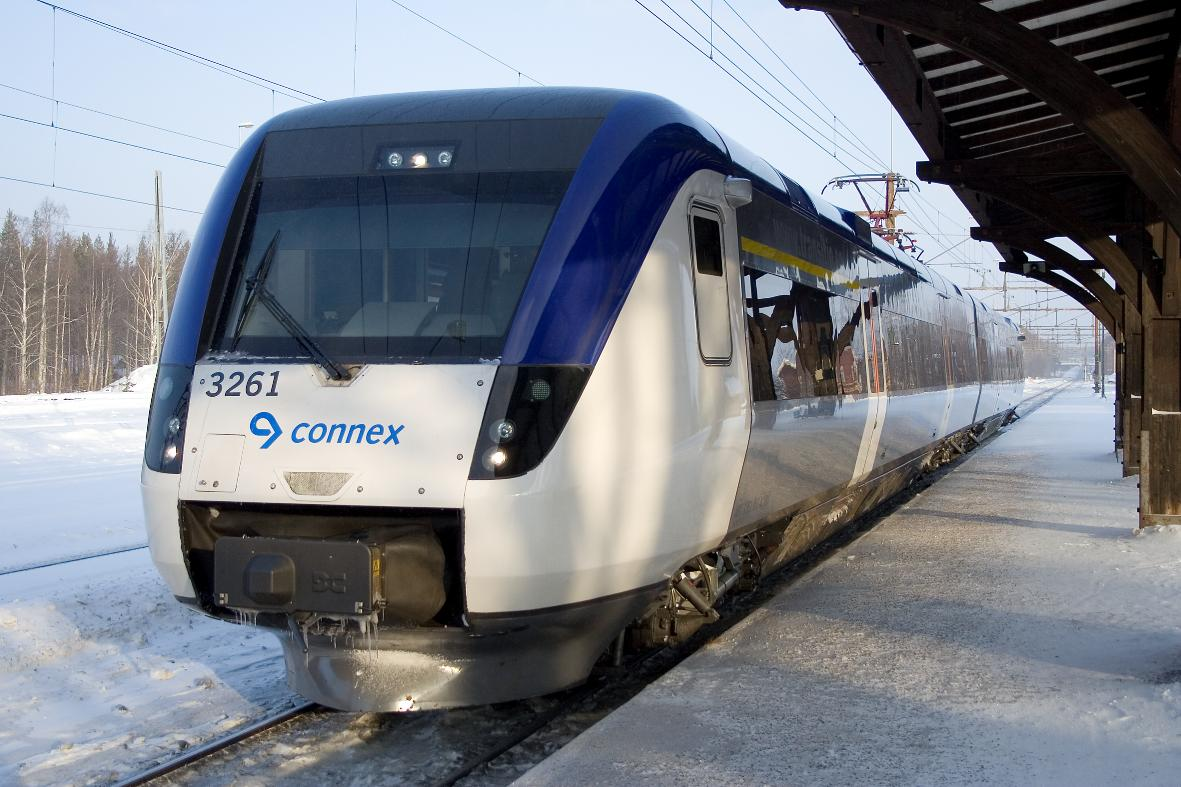
A Regina train in Sweden

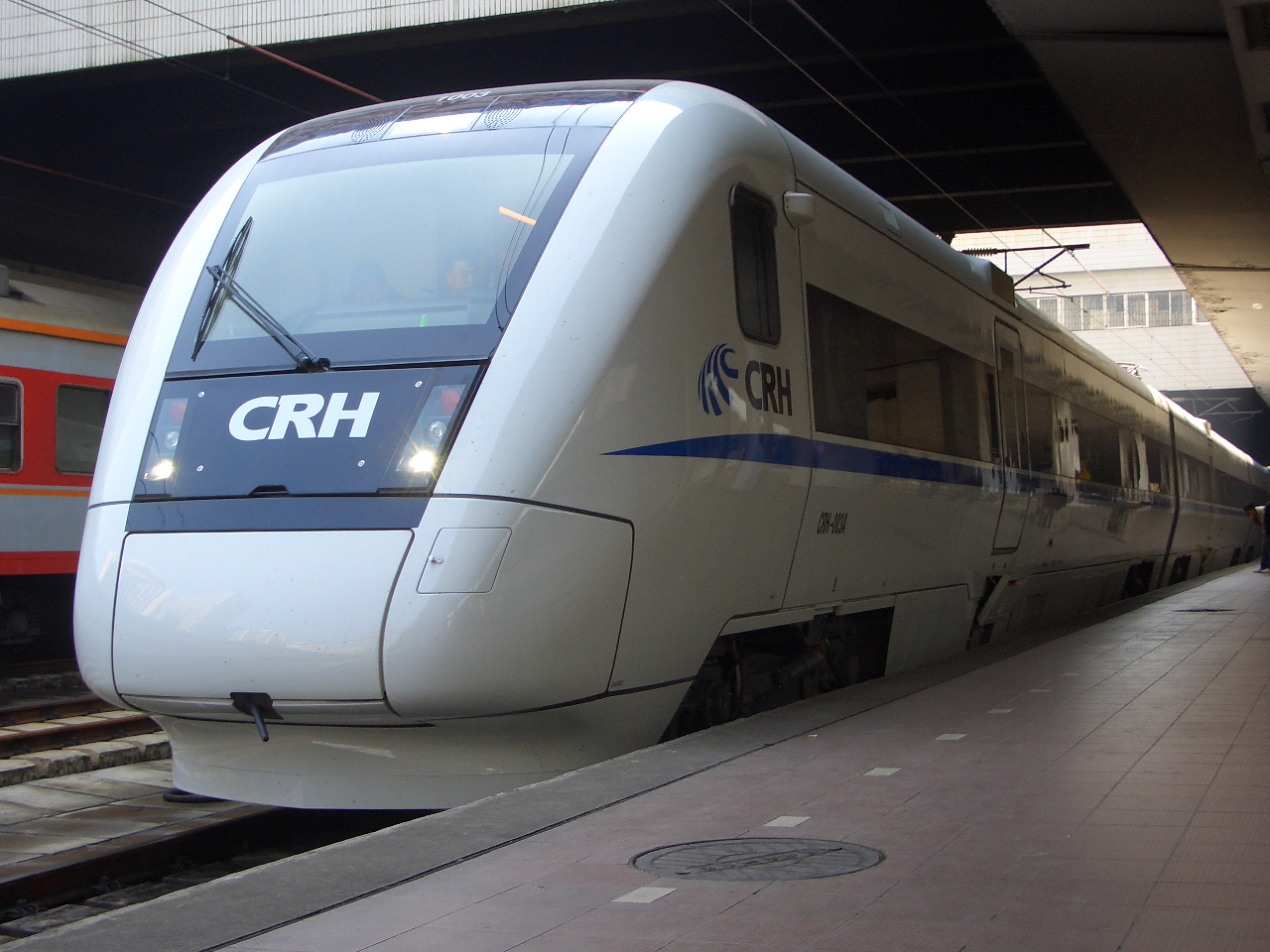
An early CRH1A at Shenzhen railway station

=== CRH1A ===
CRH1A and CRH1B are based on Bombardier's Regina family. The train was jointly adapted by Sifang and Bombardier from the C2008 design developed in Västerås, Sweden.

Each CRH1A set consists of eight cars. The first batch (CRH_{1}-001A to CRH_{1}-040A) had two first-class coaches (ZY), five second-class coaches (ZE) and one combined second-class and dining car (ZEC). The second batch (CRH_{1}-081A to CRH_{1}-120A) had two first-class coaches, one combined first- and second-class coach (ZYE), four second-class coaches and one combined second-class and dining car. The CRH1A has a design speed of 250 km/h (155 mph), although the initial 40 sets were software-limited to 220 km/h (137 mph) in service.

The first unit, CRH_{1}-001A, was delivered on 30 August 2006, and CRH1A sets entered passenger service on the Guangzhou–Shenzhen railway on 1 February 2007. Passenger facilities differed substantially between batches. A 2016 comparison reported that second-class seatbacks on the original CRH1A were not adjustable and that power sockets were provided only in the first-class sections of cars 1 and 8. The CRH1A-250 introduced adjustable seatbacks and a socket beneath every row of seats. A 2025 passenger guide likewise noted that some CRH1A and CRH1B second-class coaches may have no passenger outlets, while first-class outlets are overhead.

In July 2010, the Ministry of Railways ordered an additional 40 CRH1A sets, with the top operating speed increased to 250 km/h (155 mph). During testing on the Qinhuangdao–Shenyang passenger railway in September 2010, CRH_{1}-081A reached 278 km/h (173 mph).

On 1 July 2014, the numbering format changed from CRH_{1}—xxxA to CRH1A-1xxx; subsequently built sets used the new format from delivery.

=== CRH1A-A ===
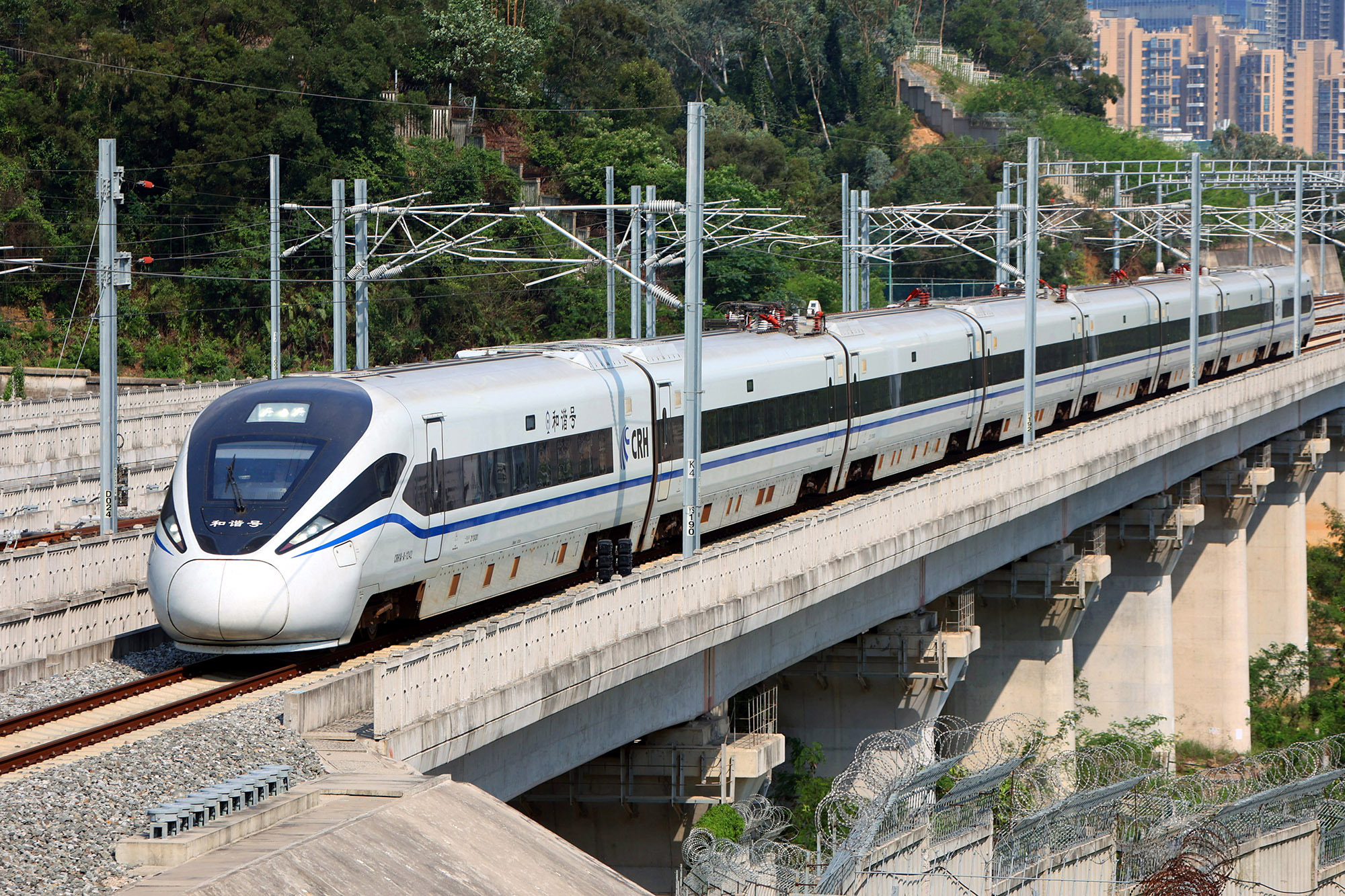
CRH1A-A

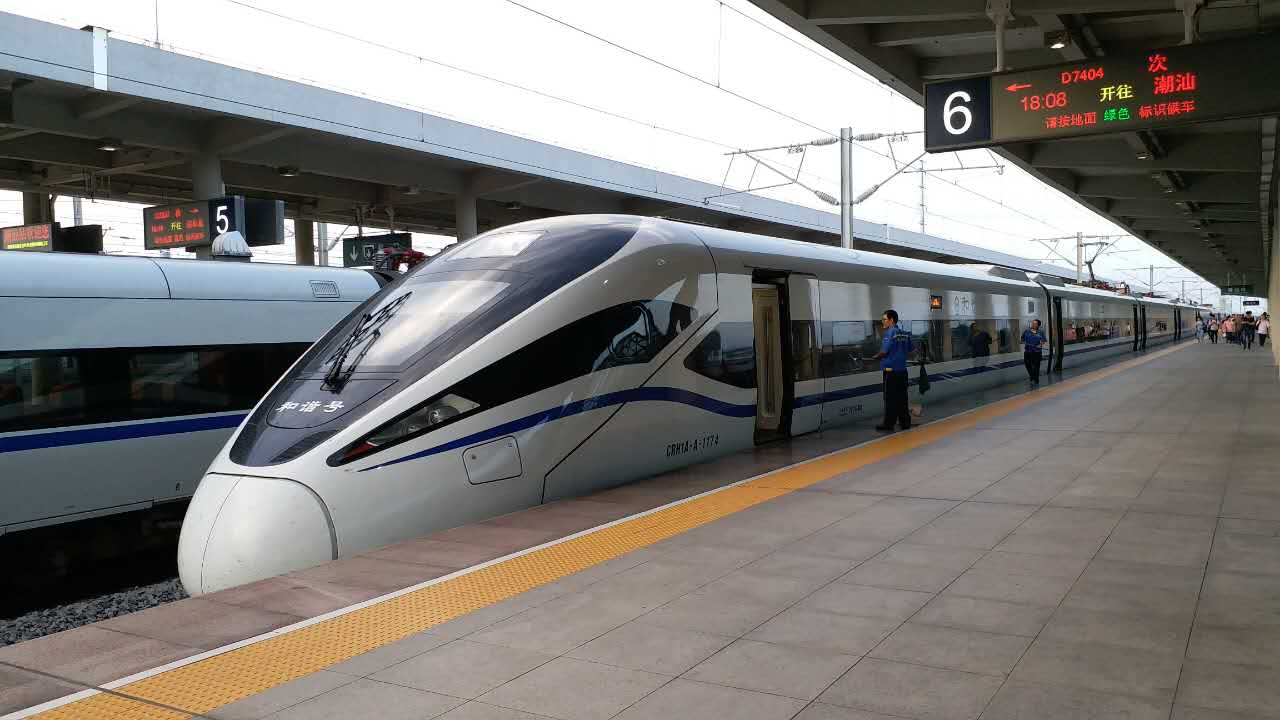
CRH1A-A at Chaoshan railway station

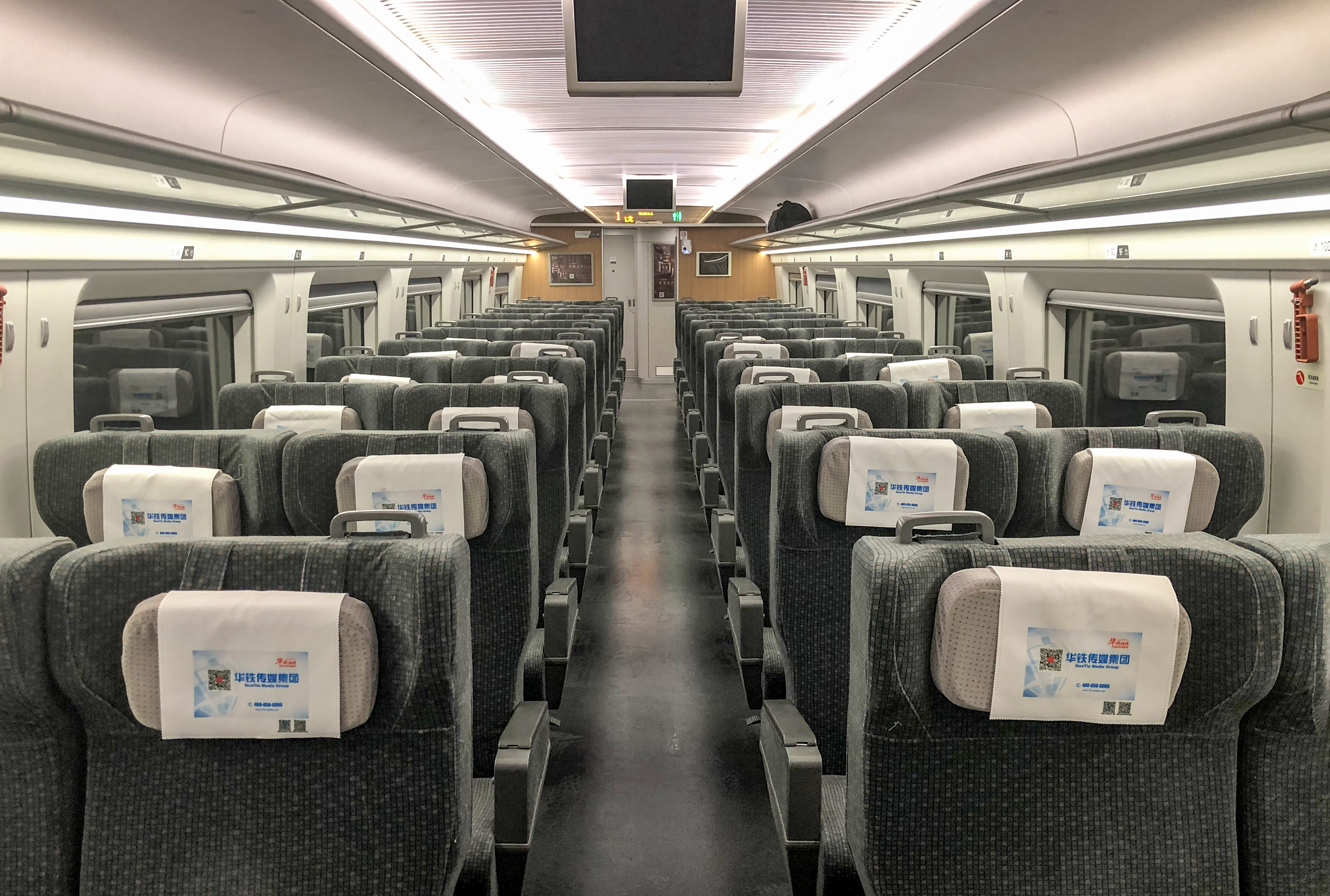
CRH1A-A First Class

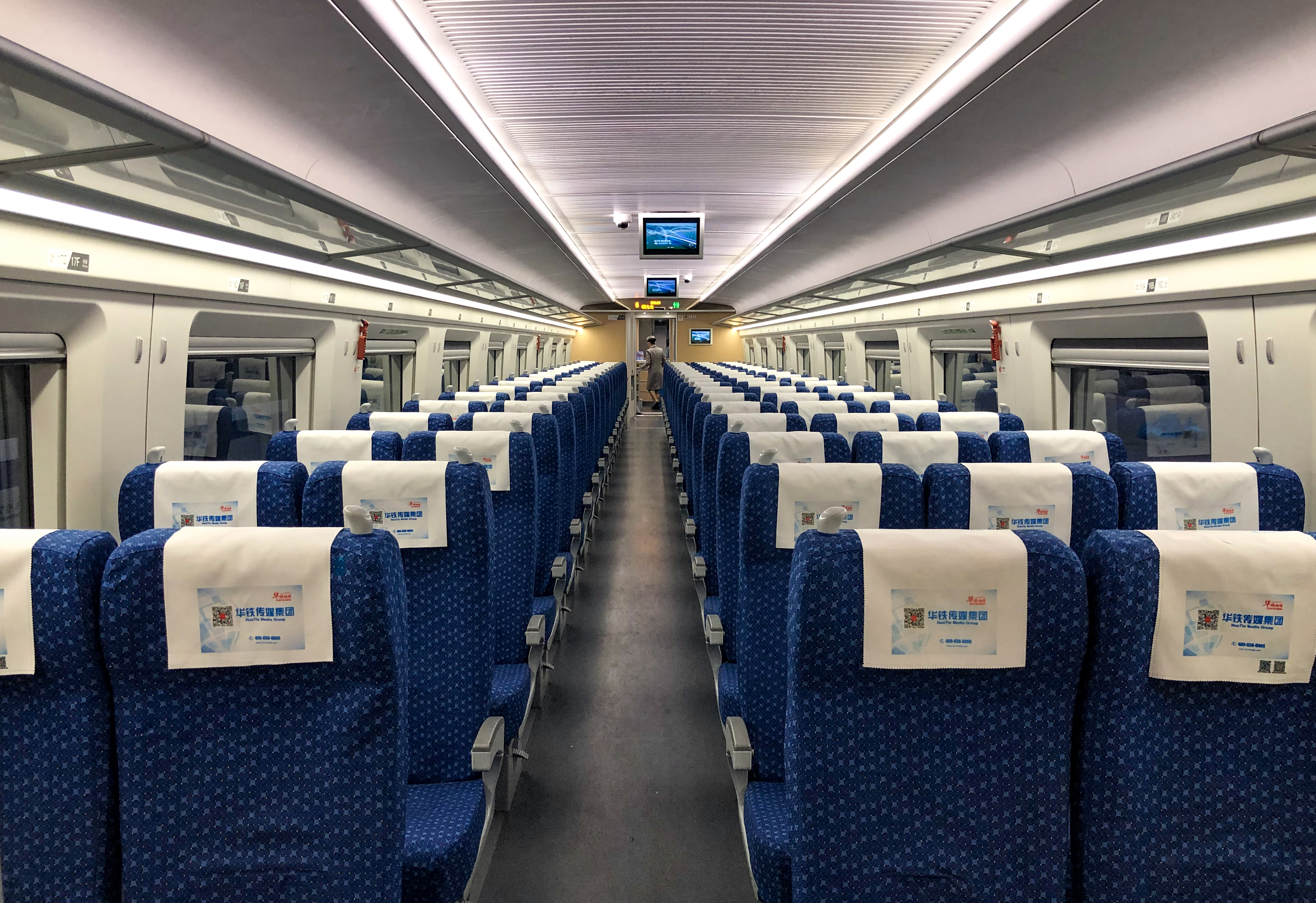
CRH1A-A second class

In September 2012, the Ministry of Railways revised its Zefiro contract, substituting 106 eight-car Zefiro 250 and Zefiro 250NG trainsets for the cancelled 16-car Zefiro 380 sets. The CRH1A-250/CRH1A–A is an aluminium-bodied Zefiro 250NG development rather than a stainless-steel Regina derivative.

=== CRH1B ===
On 31 October 2007, the Ministry of Railways ordered 20 CRH1B trainsets (CRH_{1}-041B to CRH_{1}-060B) as part of a €1 billion order for 40 16-car trains, including 20 sleepers. The CRH1B is a 16-car, higher-capacity development of the CRH1A, comprising three first-class coaches (ZY), 12 second-class coaches (ZE) and one dining car (CA). Its maximum operating speed is 250 km/h (155 mph). The type entered commercial service between Shanghai and Nanjing, and between Shanghai and Hangzhou, in April 2009.

On July 23, 2011, CRH1-046B was hit on ZY104600 car by CRH2-139E in Yongtaiwen PFL accident.

=== CRH1E ===
On 31 October 2007, the Ministry of Railways ordered 20 CRH1E trainsets (CRH_{1}-061E to CRH_{1}-080E) as the sleeper portion of the 40-train contract. The first-generation CRH1E is a stainless-steel, 16-car sleeper train based on Bombardier's Zefiro 250 platform, not an extended Regina design. The train was styled by Zagato. Each of the first 12 sets comprised one luxury sleeper (WG), 12 soft sleepers (WR), two second-class coaches (ZE) and one dining car (CA). The first CRH1E was delivered in October 2009 and entered service between Beijing and Shanghai on 4 November 2009. Fifteen first-generation CRH1E sets were delivered; three had the luxury sleeper replaced with a standard soft-sleeper car. Five additional new-generation sleeper sets were subsequently ordered.

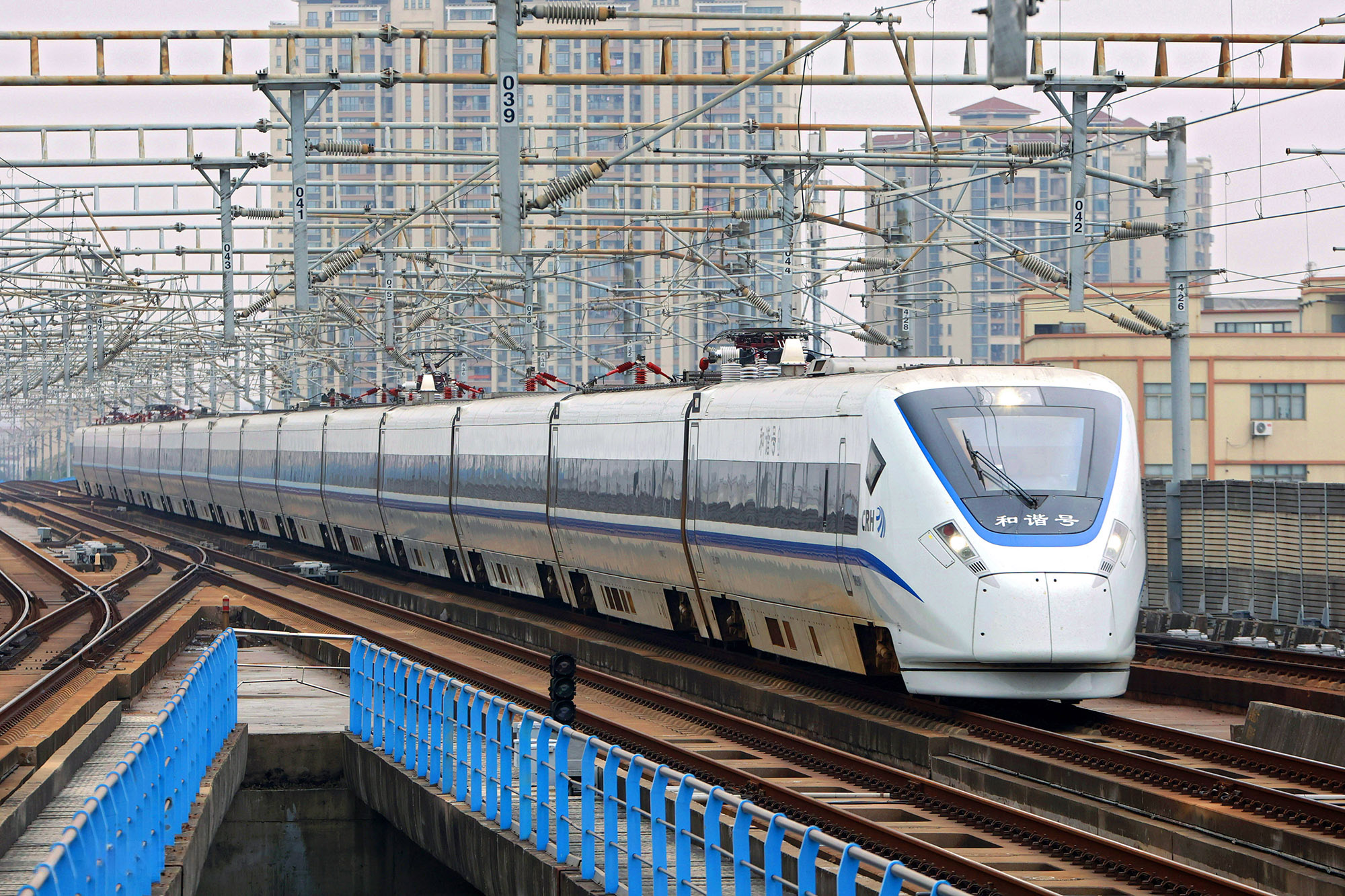
CRH1E

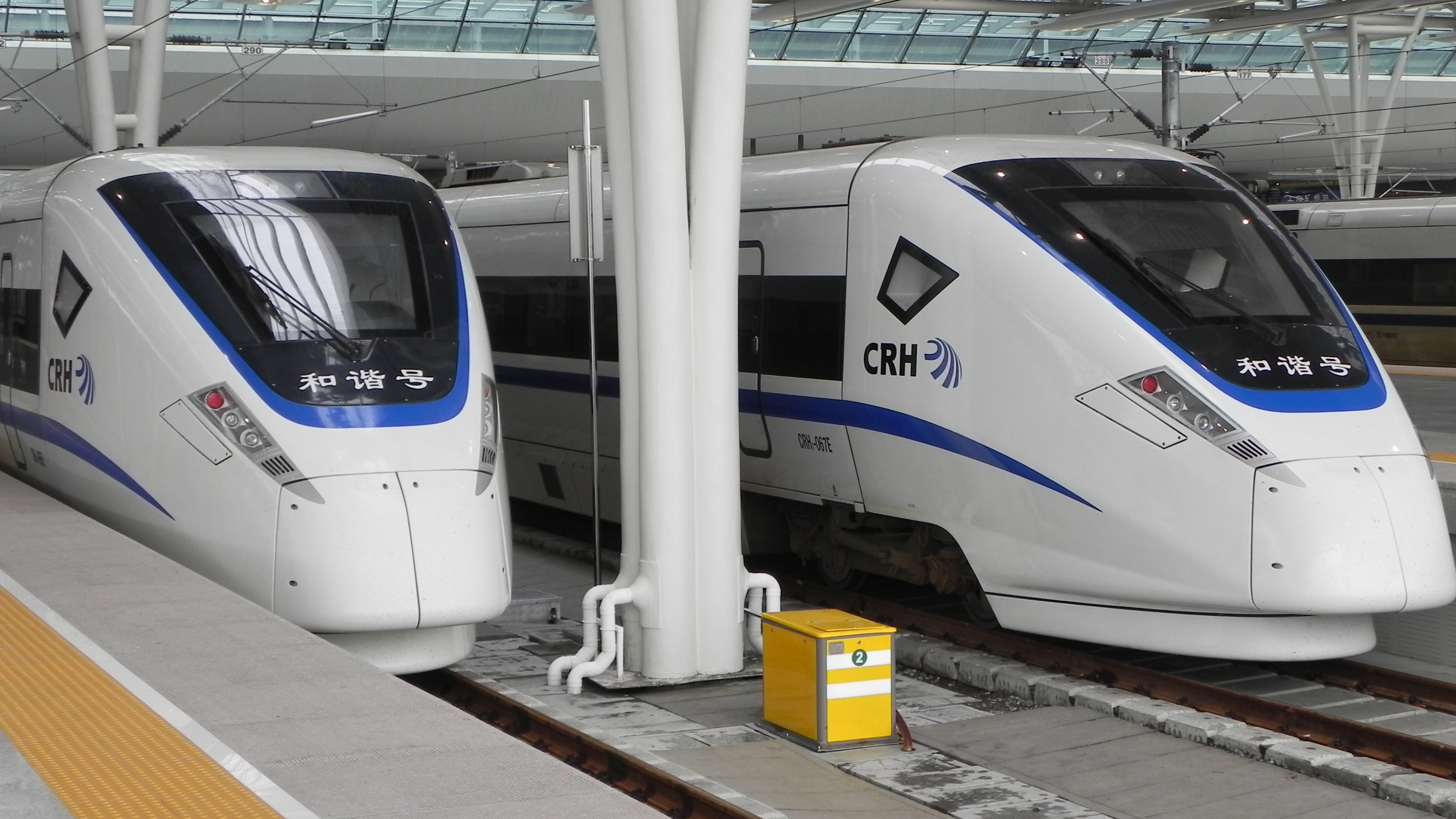
Two CRH1 series E high-speed trains in Shanghai Hongqiao Railway Station

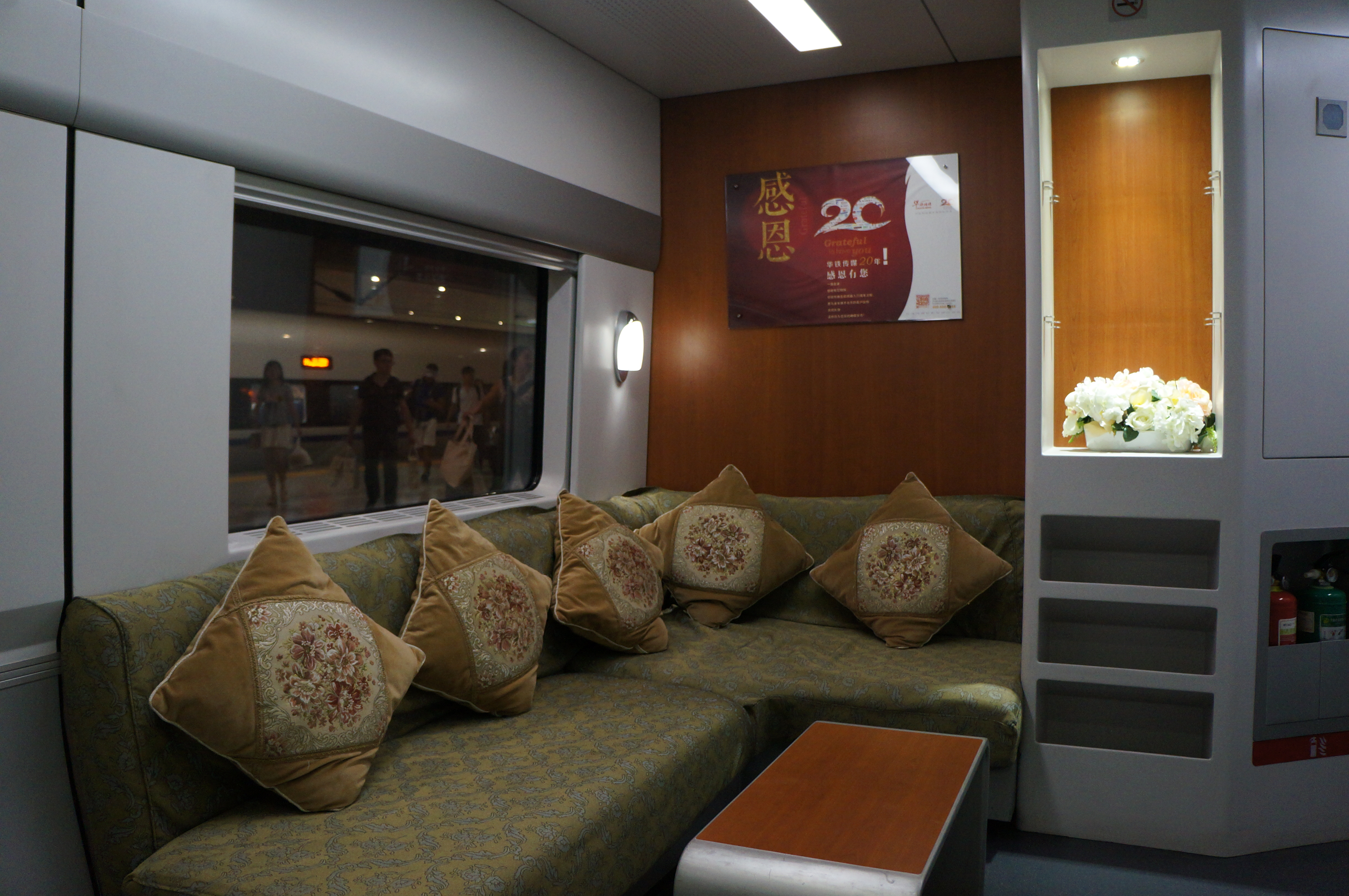
Leisure area of CRH1E

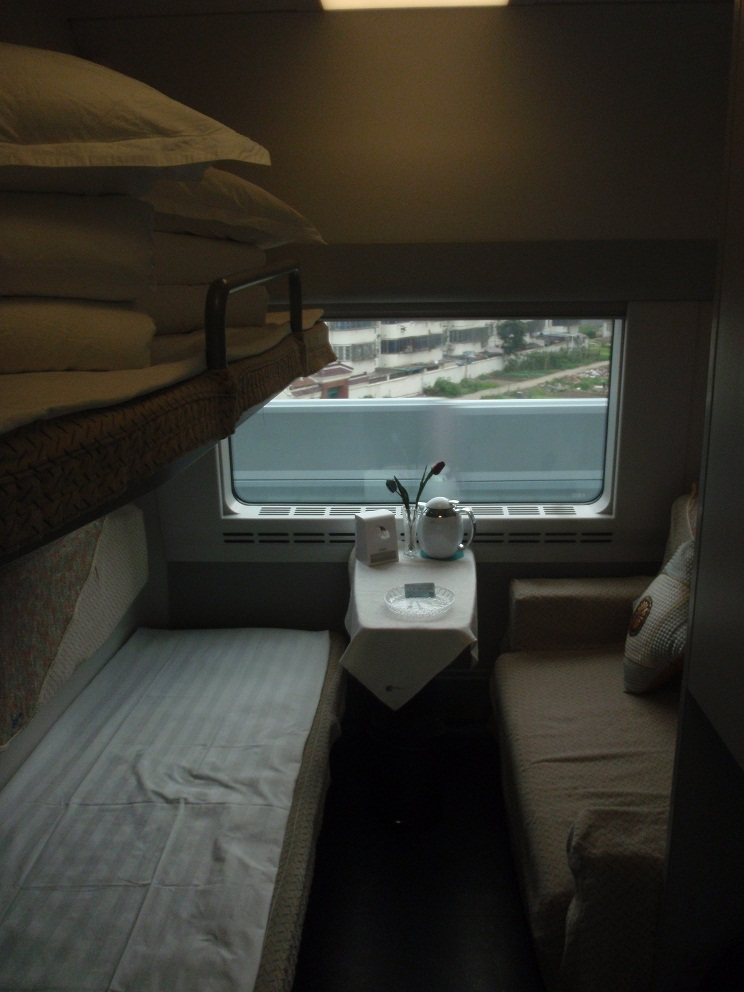
Deluxe Sleeper Compartment of CRH1E

=== CRH1E-NG ===
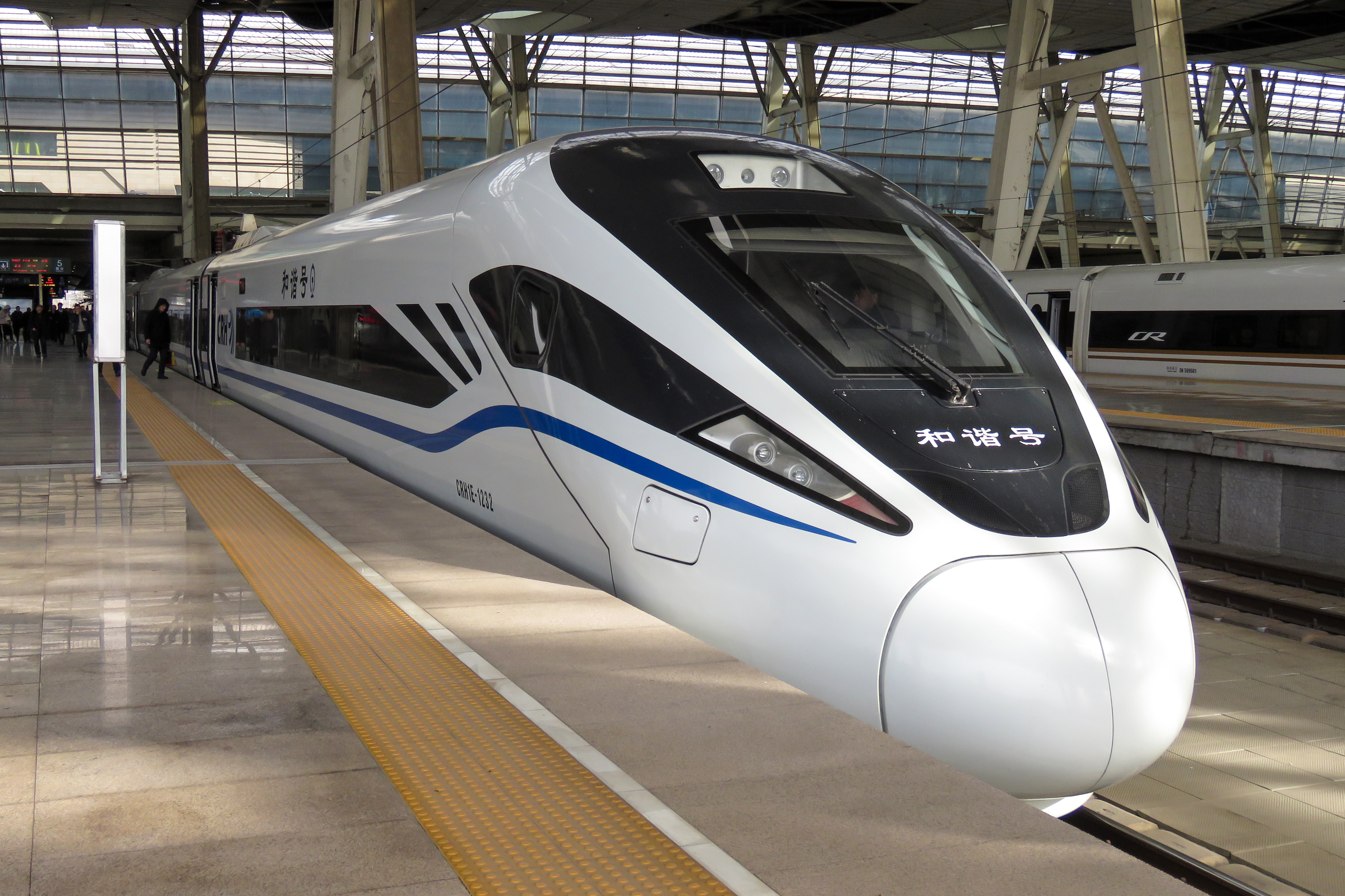
CRH1E-NG at Beijing South Railway Station

The CRH1E-NG ("new generation"), also known as CRH1E-250, was ordered in December 2015 to supplement the first-generation CRH1E fleet. It uses the Zefiro-derived nose introduced on the CRH1A–A and an aluminium-alloy carbody in place of the original CRH1E's stainless-steel construction. Each 16-car set has ten motor cars and six trailers, a power output of 11,000 kW and a maximum operating speed of 250 km/h; the maximum test speed is 280 km/h.

The five sets comprise 80 cars and were designed for overnight service with sleeping-berth interiors. Bombardier described them as combining modular concepts with technology proven in the earlier fleet.

=== CRH380D ===
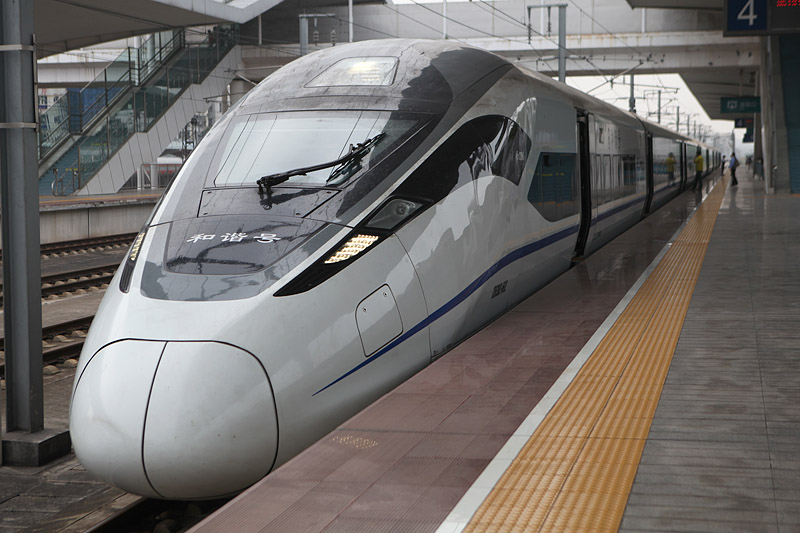
CRH380D at Guangzhou North railway station

The CRH380D is derived from the Zefiro 380 very-high-speed platform and is not a direct derivative of the Regina-based CRH1A and CRH1B. Its design speed is 380 km/h (236 mph). The eight-car sets are numbered CRH380D-1501 to CRH380D-1585.

== Formation ==
Power Destination

- M – Motor car
- T – Trailer car
- C – Driver cabin
- P – Pantograph

Coach Type

- ZY – First Class Coach
- ZE – Second Class Coach
- ZYE – First Class/Second Class Coach
- ZEC – Second Class Coach/Dining Car
- ZYT – First Class/Premier Coach
- ZET – Second Class/Premier Coach
- ZYS – First Class/Business Coach
- ZES – Second Class/Business Coach
- WR – Soft Sleeper Car
- WRC – Soft Sleeper/Dining Car
- WG – Luxury Sleeper Car

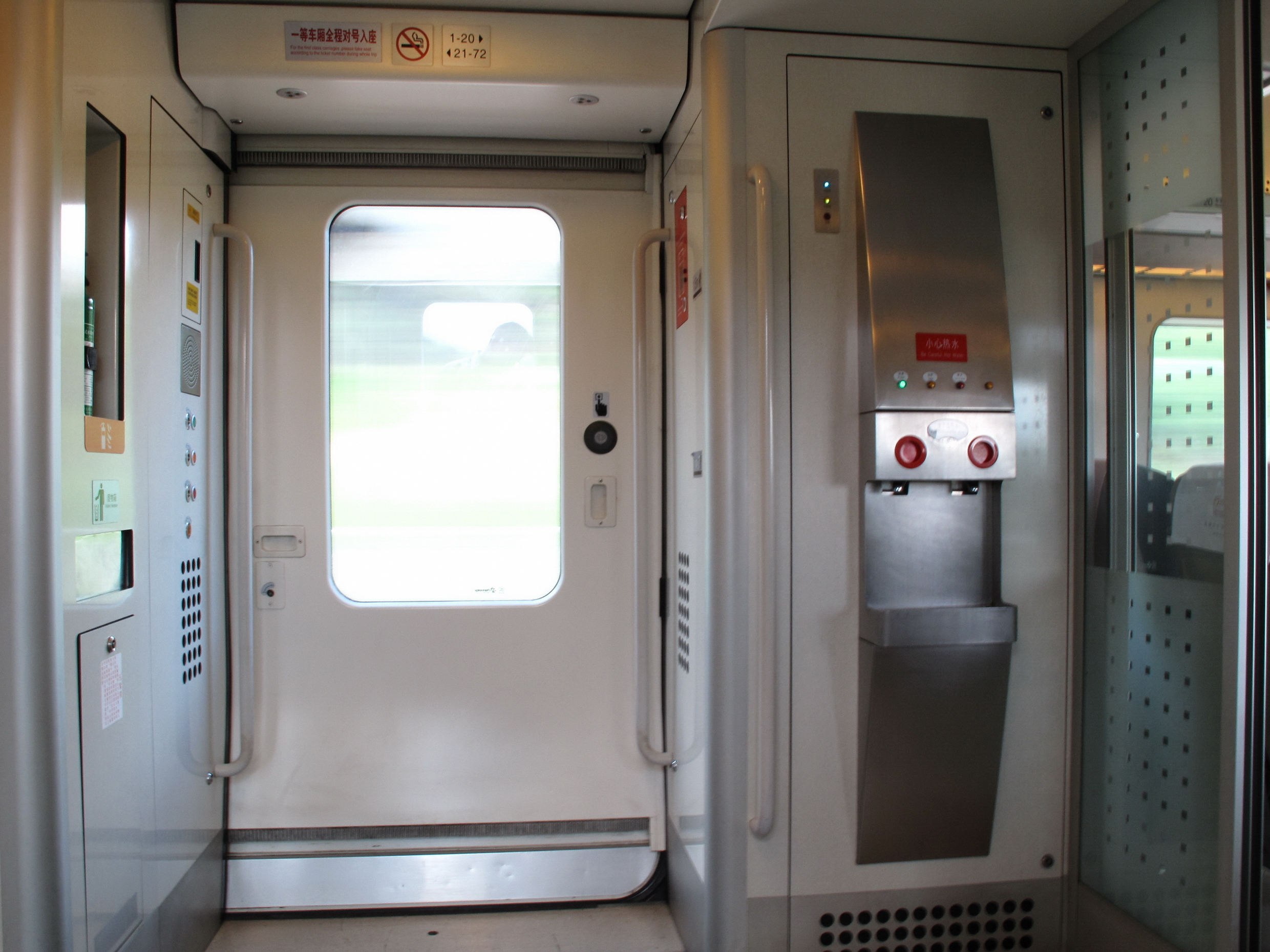
car door

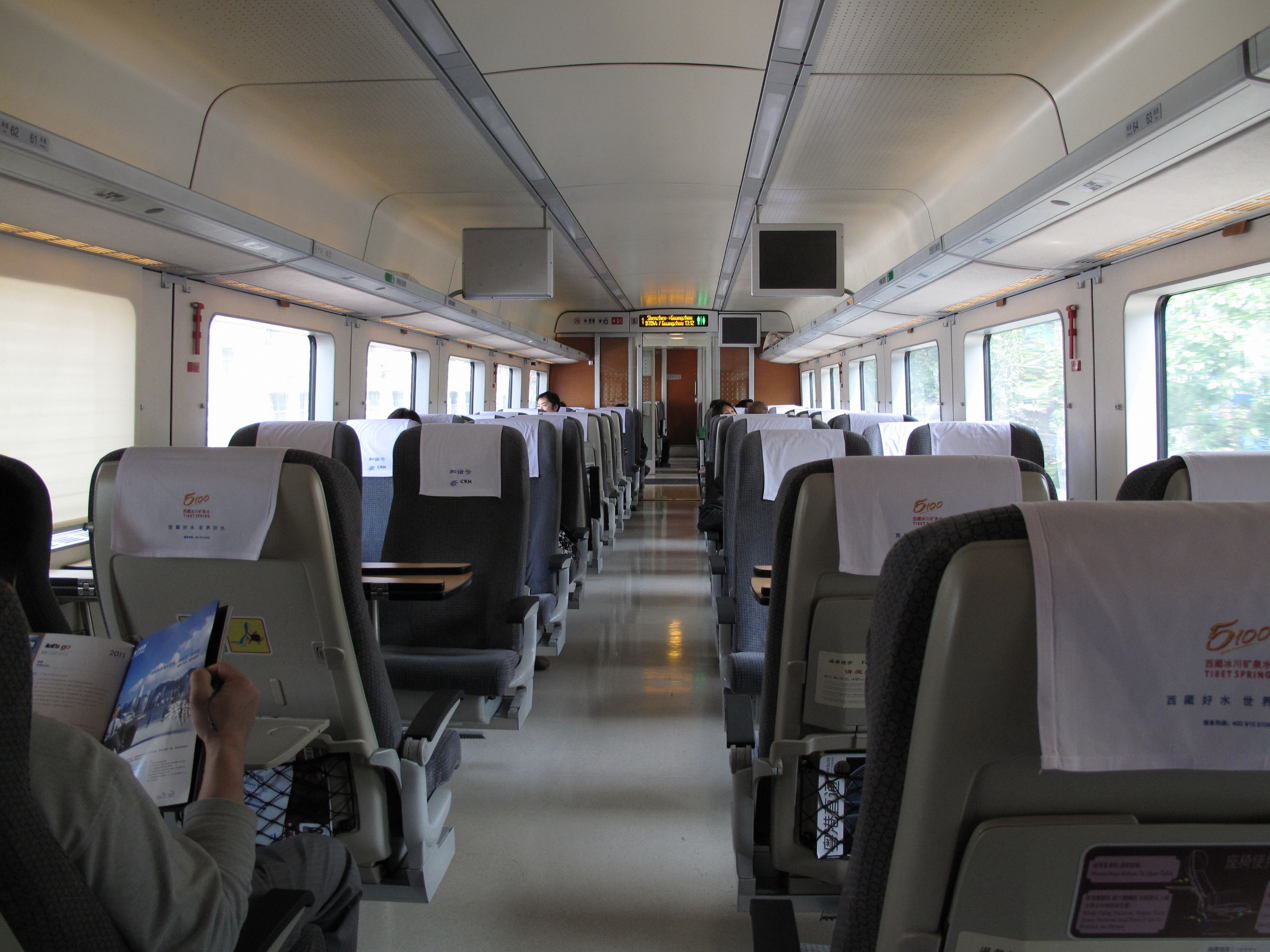
First Class Coach.

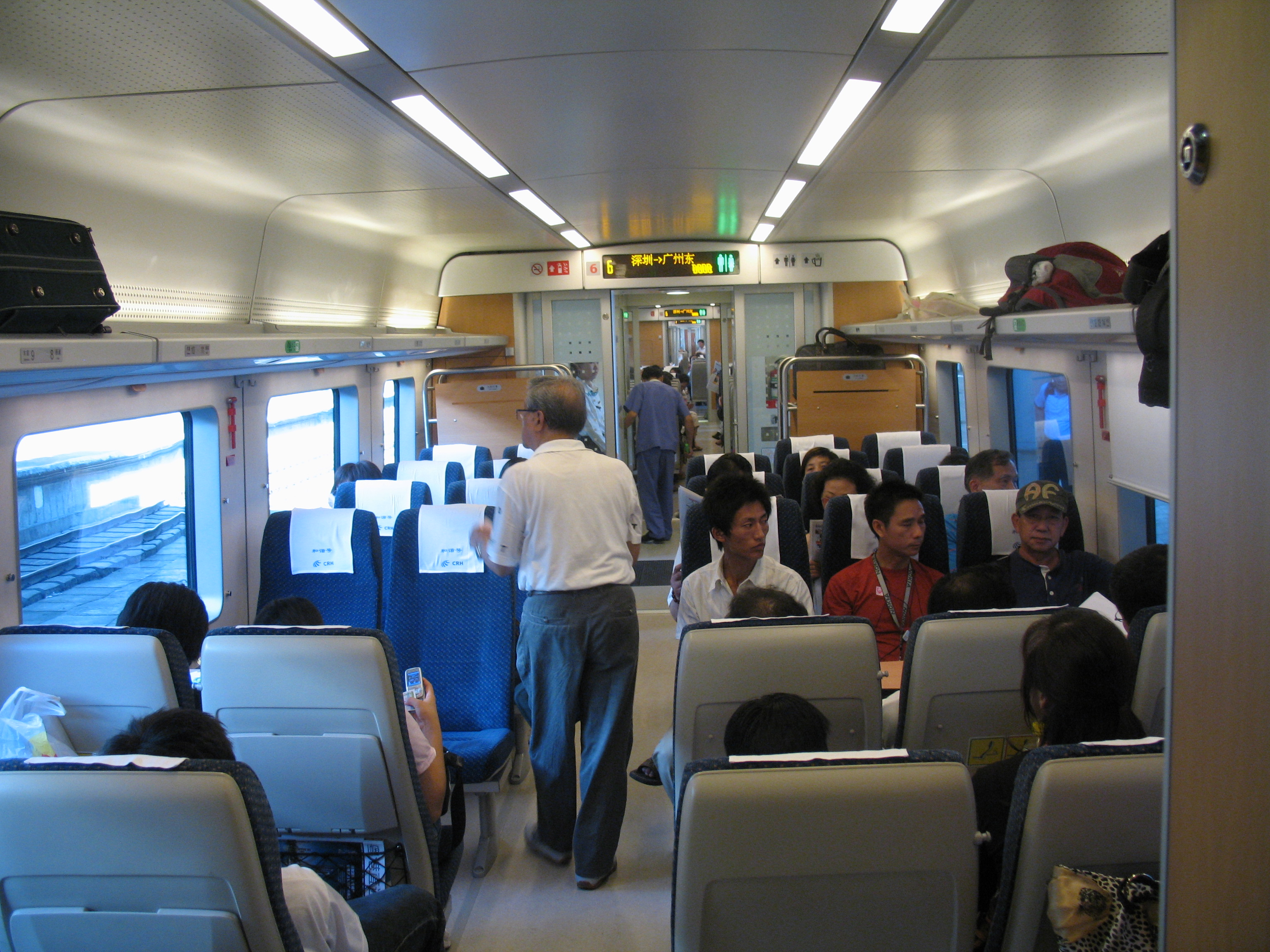
Interior of a second class coach.

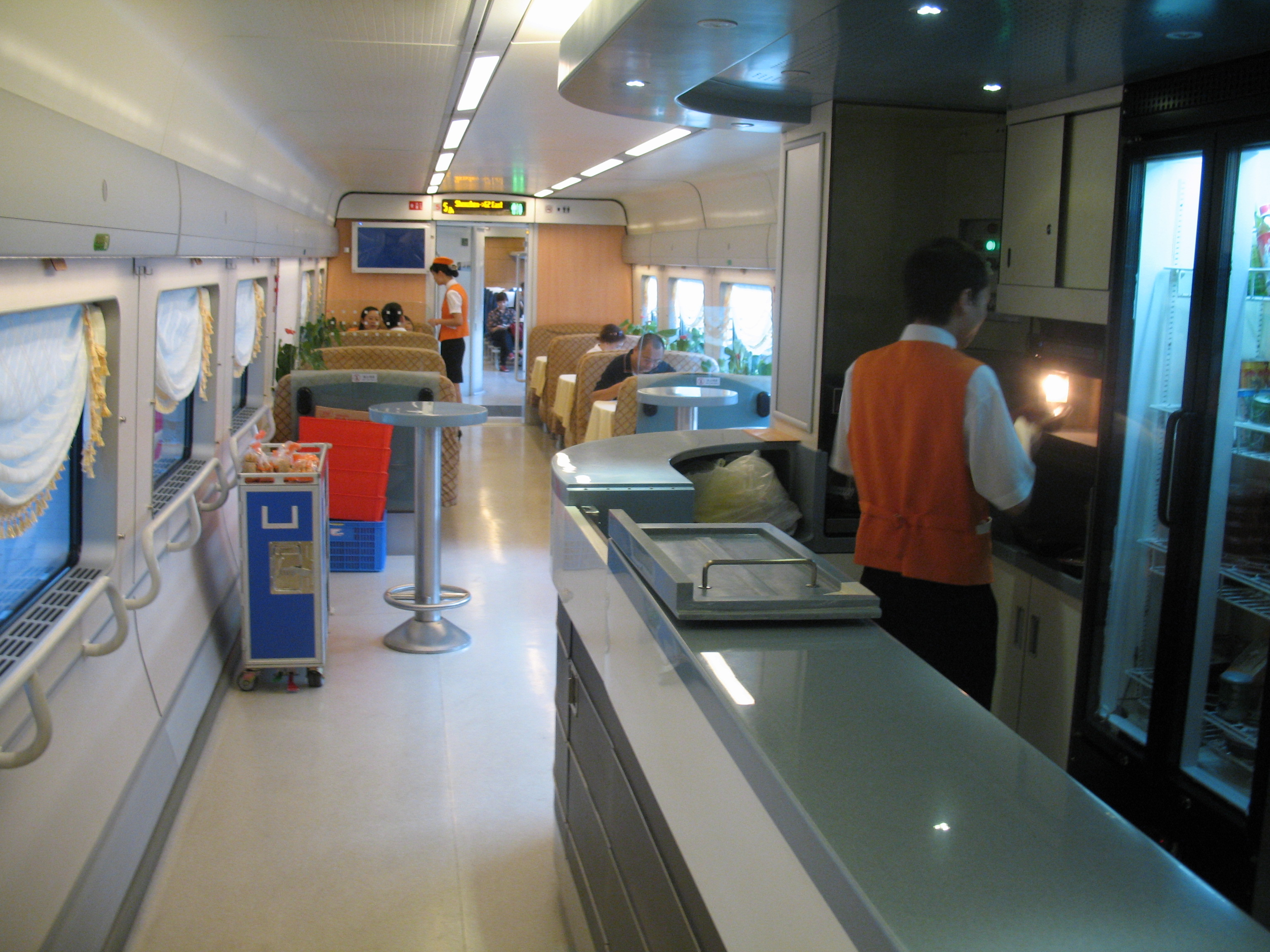
second class coach/buffet car (ZEC)

=== CRH1A & CRH1A–A ===
CRH1A-1081～1085, 1091～1093, 1105, 1110～1116, 1120, and CRH1A-1121～1166, information is currently missing.

Coach No.	1	2	3	4	5	6	7	8
Type^{1}^{3}	ZY	ZE			ZEC	ZE		ZY
Type^{2}	ZYS	ZE			ZEC	ZE		ZYS
Type^{4}	ZY	ZE		ZEC	ZYE	ZE		ZY
Type^{5} (CRH1A–A)	ZY	ZE		ZEC	ZE			
Power Configuration	Mc	TP	M		T	M	TP	Mc
Power Units	Unit 1			Unit 2			Unit 3	
Capacity^{1}	72	101			24	101		72
Capacity^{2}	57	101			24	101		68
Capacity^{3}	64	92			24	92		64
Capacity^{4}	64	92		24	77	92		64
Capacity^{5} (CRH1A–A)	48	90		77	63	90		65

- ^1 Set Nº. 1001～1012、1014～1016、1018、1167、1168
- ^2 Set Nº. 1013、1017、1019～1020
- ^3 Set Nº. 1021～1040
- ^4 Set Nº. 1086～1090、1094～1104、1106～1109、1117、1119
- ^5 Set Nº. 1169～1228、1234～1260

=== CRH1B ===
Coach No.	1	2	3	4	5	6	7	8	9	10	11	12	13	14	15	16
Type	ZE								ZEC	ZE				ZY		
Power Configuration	MC	TP	M		TP	M	T	M		T	M	TP	M		TP	MC
Power Units	Unit 1			Unit 2			Unit 3		Unit 4		Unit 5			Unit 6		
Capacity^{1}	79	92							(56)	92				72		64
Capacity^{2}	68	93							(58)	93				79	75	54

- ^1 Set Nº. 1041～1060
- ^2 Set Nº. 1076～1080

=== CRH1E ===
Coach No.	1	2	3	4	5	6	7	8	9	10	11	12	13	14	15	16
Type^{1}	ZE	WR							ZEC	WG	WR					ZE
Type^{2}	ZE	WR							ZEC	WR						ZE
Type^{3} (CRH1E-NG)	ZE	WR							WRC	WG	WR					ZE
Power Configuration	Mc	TP	M		TP	M	T	M		T	M	TP	M		TP	Mc
Power Units	Unit 1			Unit 2			Unit 3		Unit 4		Unit 5			Unit 6		
Capacity^{1}	61	40							(58)	16	40					61
Capacity^{2}	61	40							(58)	40						61
Capacity^{3} (CRH1E-NG)	55	40							12	40						55

- ^1 Set Nº. 1061～1072
- ^2 Set Nº. 1073～1075
- ^3 Set Nº. 1229～1233 (This model is based on the CRH1A-A and sometimes informally called "CRH1E-NG" or "CRH1E-250".)

=== CRH380D ===
Coach No.	1	2	3	4	5	6	7	8
Type^{1}	ZYT	ZE		ZEC	ZE	ZE		ZET
Type^{2}	ZYS	ZE		ZE	ZEC	ZE		ZES
Power Configuration	Mc	TP	M	T		M	TP	Mc
Power Units	Unit 1			Unit 2			Unit 3	
Capacity^{1}	6+32	84		45+14	84	81	84	6+50
Capacity^{2}	5+28	85		75	63	85	85	5+40

- ^1 Set Nº. 1501～1510
- ^2 Set Nº. 1511～1585

== Distribution ==
As of April 2018, 260 CRH1 series EMU and 85 CRH380D series EMU are in service.

Operator	Quantity	Serial number	Depot	Lines serving	Notes
CRH1A
CR Guangzhou	22	1001-1020, 1167-1168	Guangzhou East	Guangzhou–Shenzhen Railway, Guangzhou–Zhuhai Intercity Railway, Guangshengang XRL	
CR Guangzhou	31	1086-1090, 1094–1104, 1106–1109, 1117–1119, 1123–1124, 1141–1143, 1154, 1165–1166	Shenzhen North	Hangzhou–Fuzhou–Shenzhen High-Speed Railway	
CR Nanchang	18	1121, 1122, 1125–1140	Fuzhou	Hangzhou–Fuzhou–Shenzhen High-Speed Railway, Longyan–Xiamen Railway, Xiangtang–Putian Railway	
CR Nanchang	17	1147-1153, 1155-1164	Fuzhou South	Hangzhou–Fuzhou–Shenzhen High-Speed Railway, Longyan–Xiamen Railway, Xiangtang–Putian Railway	
CR Nanchang	17	1081-1085, 1091–1093, 1105, 1110–1116, 1120	Xiamen North	Hangzhou–Fuzhou–Shenzhen High-Speed Railway, Longyan–Xiamen Railway, Xiangtang–Putian Railway	
CR Chengdu	23	1021-1040, 1144-1146	Chengdu East	Chengdu–Dujiangyan Intercity Railway, Dazhou–Chengdu Railway, Shanghai–Wuhan–Chengdu High-Speed Railway, Chongqing–Lanzhou Railway	
CRH1A-A
CR Guangzhou	4	1169, 1234-1236	Guangzhou East	Guangzhou–Shenzhen Railway	
CR Guangzhou	9	1170-1176, 1217-1218	Shenzhen North	Hangzhou–Fuzhou–Shenzhen High-Speed Railway	
CR Guangzhou	16	1177, 1179–1181, 1183–1184, 1209–1216, 1248, 1250	Sanya	Hainan Eastern Ring High-Speed Railway, Hainan Western Ring High-Speed Railway	
CR Guangzhou	33	1182, 1219–1228, 1237–1247, 1249, 1251-1260	Foshan	Guiyang–Guangzhou High-Speed Railway, Nanning–Guangzhou High-Speed Railway, Chongqing–Guiyang high-speed railway, Shanghai–Wuhan–Chengdu high-speed railway, Chengdu–Chongqing intercity railway	
CR Nanchang	24	1185-1208	Fuzhou South	Hangzhou–Fuzhou–Shenzhen High-Speed Railway, Longyan–Xiamen Railway, Hefei–Fuzhou High-Speed Railway	
CRH1B
CR Shanghai	13	1052-1059, 1076-1080	Nanxiang	Shanghai–Hangzhou High-Speed Railway, Hangzhou–Fuzhou–Shenzhen High-Speed Railway, Shanghai–Wuhan–Chengdu High-Speed Railway	
CR Shanghai	11	1041-1045, 1047–1051, 1060	Hangzhou	Nanjing–Hangzhou High-Speed Railway, Shanghai–Wuhan–Chengdu High-Speed Railway, Shanghai–Hangzhou High-Speed Railway, Hangzhou–Fuzhou–Shenzhen High-Speed Railway	
China Railway	1	1046	Retired		Written off after Wenzhou train collision, Cars 1-12 are used as a training train whereas Cars 13-16 were scrapped due to derailment.
CRH1E
CR Shanghai	20	1061-1075, 1229-1233	Nanxiang	Shanghai–Wuhan–Chengdu High-Speed Railway, Shanghai–Hangzhou High-Speed Railway, Hangzhou–Fuzhou–Shenzhen High-Speed Railway, Guangzhou–Shenzhen–Hong Kong Express Rail Link, Nanning–Guangzhou High-Speed Railway	
CRH380D
CR Chengdu	13	1538-1545, 1550, 1552–1553, 1555, 1557	Chongqing North	Chengdu–Chongqing Intercity Railway	
CR Chengdu	22	1546-1549, 1554, 1556, 1558–1560, 1563–1564, 1567–1568, 1571–1572, 1578-1584	Chengdu East	Chengdu–Chongqing Intercity Railway	
CR Chengdu	2	1537, 1551	Guiyang North	Chengdu–Chongqing Intercity Railway, Chongqing–Guiyang high-speed railway, Shanghai–Kunming High-Speed Railway	
CR Shanghai	48	1501-1536, 1561–1562, 1565–1566, 1569–1570, 1573–1577, 1585	Shanghai Nanxiang	Nanjing–Hangzhou High-Speed Railway, Shanghai–Nanjing Intercity Railway, Hangzhou–Fuzhou–Shenzhen High-Speed Railway, Shanghai–Kunming High-Speed Railway	

== See also ==
- China Railway CRH6
- Bombardier Regina
- Bombardier Zefiro
- List of high speed trains
