= Suining railway station (Sichuan) =

Railway station in Suining, China

Suining 遂宁
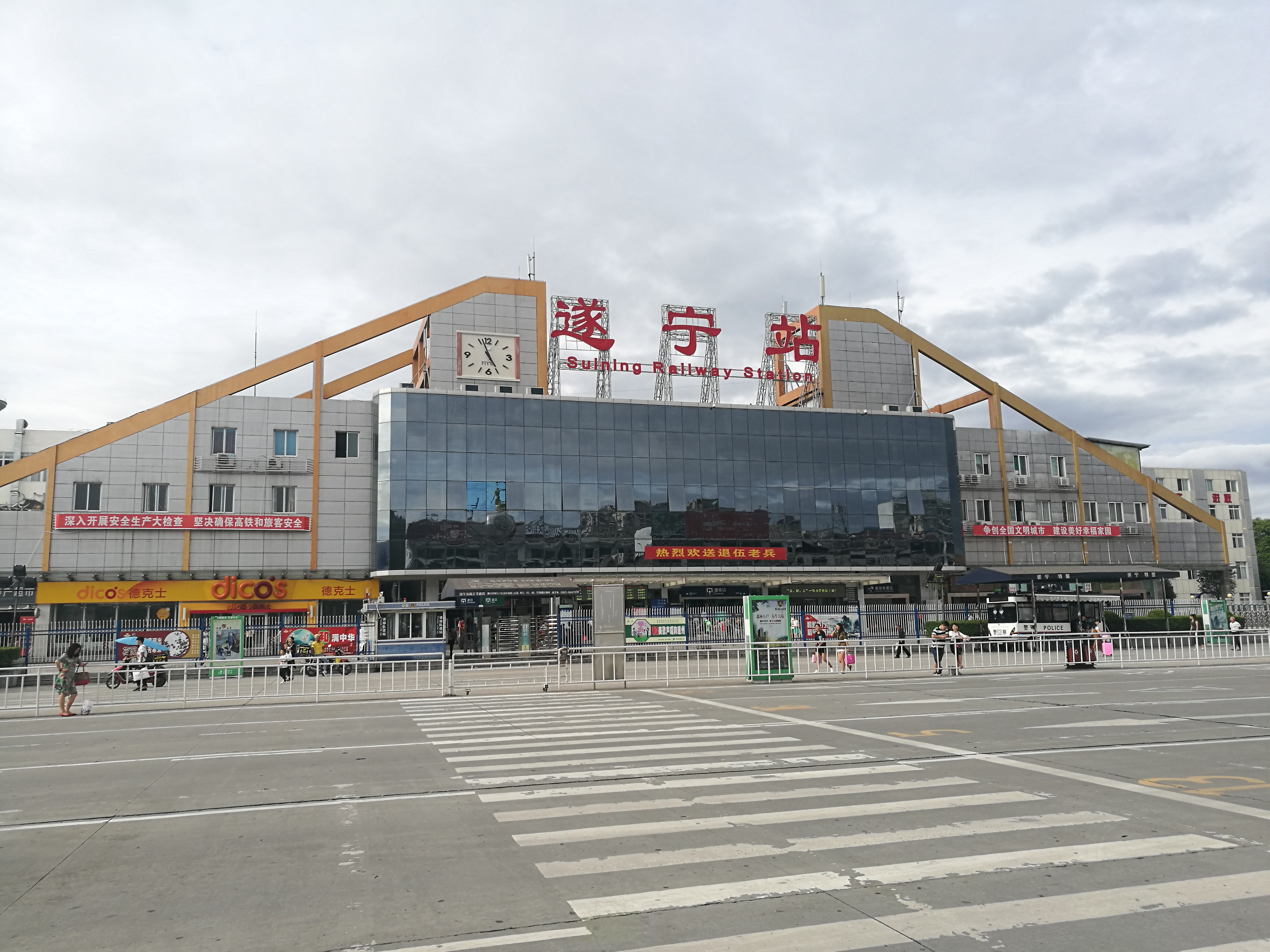

General information
- Location: Chuanshan District, Suining, Sichuan; China
- Coordinates: 30°32′27″N 105°32′15″E
- Operated by: China Railway Corporation
- Lines: Suining–Chongqing railway; Chengdu–Dazhou–Wanzhou high-speed railway (under construction)
Location

Suining railway station is a railway station located in Suining, Sichuan Province, People's Republic of China, on the Suiyu Railway (Suining–Chongqing Railway) which is operated by China Railway Corporation.
