= Dazhou–Chengdu railway =

Railroad in southwest China

Dazhou–Chengdu railway 达成铁路

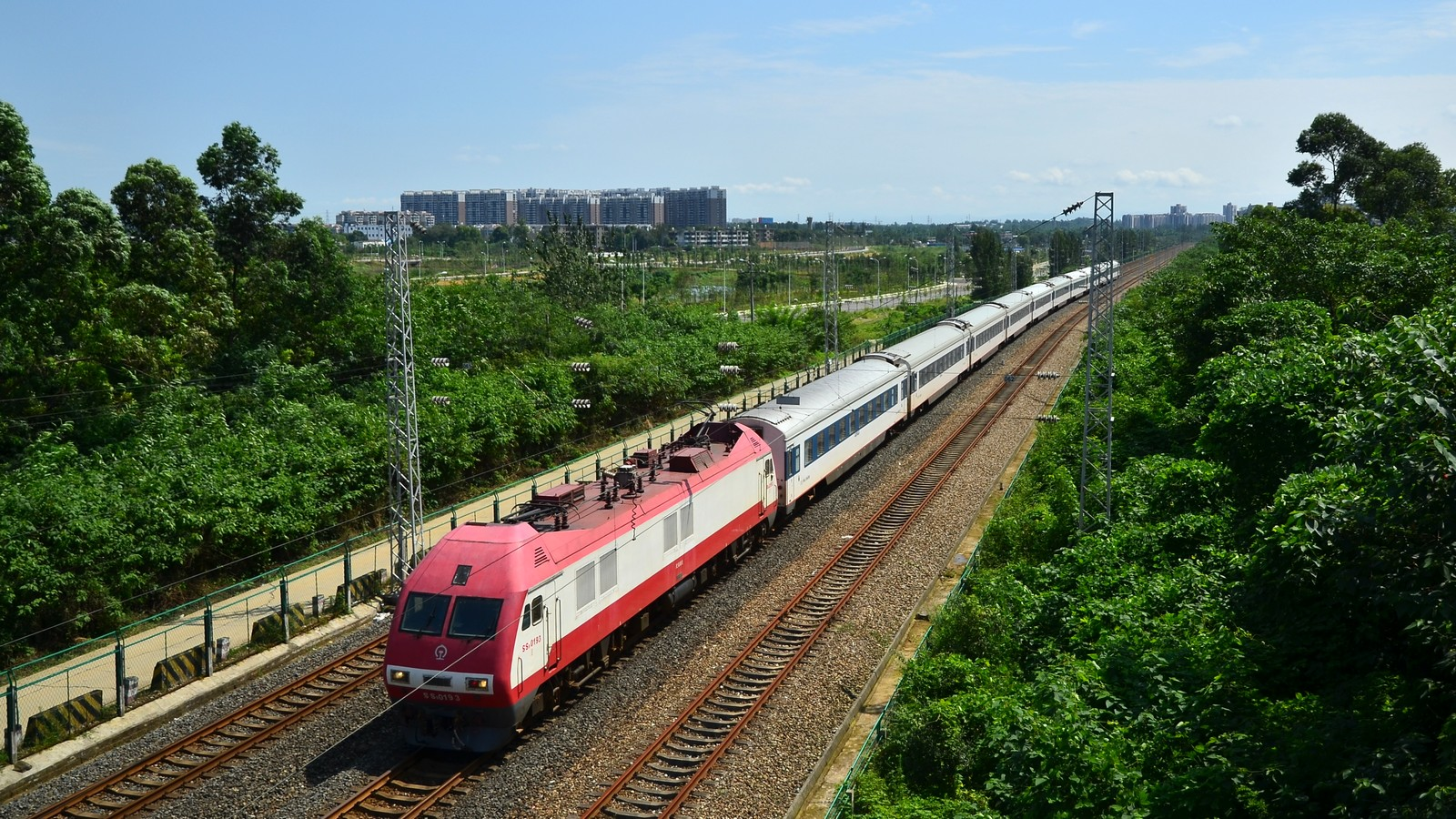
- Shaoshan 9G electric locomotive No. 0193, which was attached to Wuchang South locomotive depot, hauls Z123 train at the Longtan Overpass over the Chengdu Third Ring Road, in 2013

Overview
- Status: Active
- Termini: Chengdu; Dazhou

Service
- Type: Heavy rail
- Operator(s): China Railway

Technical
- Line length: 353 km (219 mi)
- Number of tracks: 2 (Sanhuizhen–Suining); 1 (Suining–Bali)
- Track gauge: 1,435 mm (4 ft 8 1/2 in) standard gauge
- Electrification: 50 Hz 25,000 V
- Operating speed: 200 km/h (124 mph) (Sanhuizhen–Suining); 80 km/h (50 mph) (Suining–Bali)

Dazhou–Chengdu Railway, or Dacheng Railway (simplified Chinese: 达成铁路; traditional Chinese: 達成鐵路; pinyin: dáchéng tiělù), is a double-track, electrified railroad in Sichuan Province of southwest China. The railway is named after its two terminal cities Chengdu and Dazhou. The line has a total length of 403 km (250 mi) and opened in 1997. Other cities and towns along the route include Suining and Nanchong. The line is owned and operated by the Dacheng Railway Company Limited, a 70-30 joint venture between the Ministry of Railways and Sichuan Provincial Government.

== Route ==
The Dacheng-Chengdu Railway runs from Chengdu, the provincial capital in central Sichuan to Sanhui Township of Qu County, Dazhou Municipality in eastern Sichuan. The Dacheng Line forms an important link in China's national railway network, connecting the Baoji-Chengdu and Chengdu-Kunming Railways in the west with the Suining−Chongqing Railway in the center and Xiangyang-Chongqing Railway in the east. It is a major railway outlet for the Sichuan Basin, and a section of the Shanghai–Wuhan–Chengdu High-Speed Railway. High-speed train service between Chengdu and Chongqing run on the Dazhou−Chengdu and Suining−Chongqing Lines instead of the longer and older Chengdu–Chongqing Railway.

== History ==
The Dacheng Railway was proposed in 1958 by Railway Minister Teng Daiyuan but was halted after two years of planning due to economic difficulties caused by the Great Leap Forward. The project was reconsidered in 1965 but was set aside in favor of building the Xiangfan-Chongqing Railway first. In 1986, Deng Xiaoping, a native of eastern Sichuan, pressed for the project to proceed and construction began in June 1992. Some 386 km (240 mi) of new tracks were laid. The railway opened on December 25, 1997.

From June 2005 to 1 July 2009, the entire line was electrified. A second track was opened on the Chengdu–Suining section on 1 April 2006 that allows trains to reach a top speed of 200 km/h. A second line was added to the Suining-Sanhui section in the east and trains can reach 160 km/h on this section.

On 7 July 2009, the high-speed track between Chengdu and Suining was duplicated and these two tracks were subsequently designated as the Suining–Chengdu railway. The original low-speed, single track line between Chengdu and Suining remains as part of the Dazhou–Chengdu railway.

== Rail junctions ==
- Chengdu: Baoji–Chengdu Railway, Chengdu–Kunming Railway
- Suining: Suining–Chongqing Railway
- Dazhou: Xiangyang–Chongqing Railway

== See also ==
- List of railways in China
