= Shanghai–Wuhan–Chengdu passenger-dedicated line =

Railway line in China

- CRH Logo
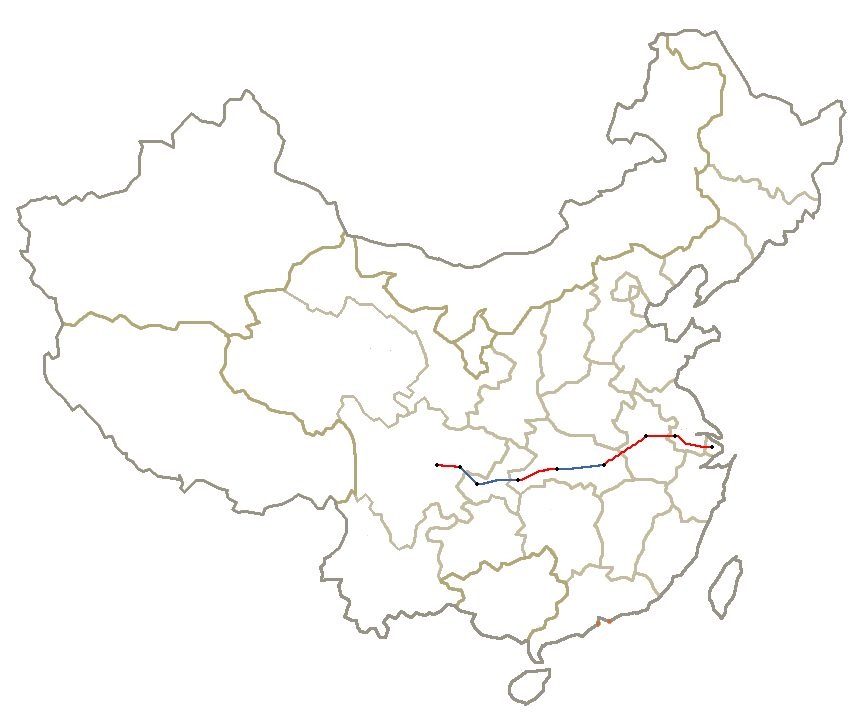

Overview
- Native name: 沪汉蓉快速客运通道
- Status: Operational
- Owner: CR Shanghai; CR Wuhan; CR Chengdu
- Locale: Shanghai; Jiangsu province; Anhui province; Hubei province; Chongqing; Sichuan province
- Termini: Shanghai; Chengdudong
- Stations: 99

Service
- Type: High-speed rail Heavy rail
- System: China Railway High-speed
- Operators: CR Shanghai; CR Wuhan; CR Chengdu
- Rolling stock: CRH1/2

History
- Opened: July 1, 2014

Technical
- Line length: 2078 km
- Number of tracks: 2 (Double-track)
- Track gauge: 1,435 mm (4 ft 8 1/2 in)
- Electrification: 25 kV 50 Hz AC (Overhead line)
- Operating speed: 250–350 km/h (160–220 mph)
- Maximum incline: 1.8%

Shanghai–Wuhan–Chengdu passenger-dedicated line
- Simplified Chinese: 沪汉蓉快速客运通道
- Traditional Chinese: 滬漢蓉快速客運通道
Transcriptions
Standard Mandarin
- Hanyu Pinyin: Hùhànróng Kuàisù Kèyùn Tōngdào

Shanghai–Wuhan–Chengdu passenger-dedicated line or Huhanrong PDL (Chinese: 沪汉蓉快速客运通道), is a fully completed rail corridor in China. It is operated by CR Shanghai Group, CR Wuhan Group and CR Chengdu Group. The Chinese name of the railway line, Huhanrong, is a combination of the abbreviations for Shanghai (沪, Hù), Wuhan (汉, Hàn), and Chengdu (蓉, Róng), three major cities along the line.

The Huhanrong PDL is one of the four east–west high-speed rail corridors outlined in China's national high-speed rail plan. From east to west, it will connect the major cities of Shanghai (a provincial-level municipality), Nanjing (the capital of Jiangsu), Hefei (the capital of Anhui), Wuhan (the capital of Hubei), Chongqing (a province-level municipality), and Chengdu (the capital of Sichuan). The total population of the four provinces and two municipalities served by this rail line is over 320 million (as of 2008).

The completed line, as designed during the 4+4 national high speed railway grid plan mostly became a higher-speed railway with trains running at a maximum speed of 200 km/h (120 mph) between Nanjing and Chongqing. The Nanjing and Chongqing sections were even built to National Class I railway standards which can accommodate freight, some sections are planned and built to support double-stack rail transport. In addition the Yichang to Nanjing section has design reservations for at least 250 kilometers per hour operations. The Hefei–Wuhan section even had reservations for 300 kilometers per hour operations. Speeds has been increased on the line to 250km/h between Wuhan and Nanjing on July 1, 2018.

To manage the increasing passenger traffic a newer Yangtze River corridor announced in the updated 8+8 National high speed railway grid plan is now under construction. This newer updated line runs roughly parallel to the existing Huhanrong PDL with most sections designed for a faster 350 km/h (220 mph) standard. Huhanrong PDL will become the Shanghai–Wuhan–Chengdu railway and begin to handle more freight and local passenger services.

== Components ==
All sections are now operational.

Operational lines are marked with green background.

Section	Description	Designed speed (km/h)	Length (km)	Construction start date	Open date
Shanghai–Wuhan–Chengdu passenger railway	PDL through the Yangtze Valley consisting the Shanghai–Nanjing section of the Beijing–Shanghai line, and 7 mixed-use HSR segments connecting Nanjing, Hefei, Wuhan, Yichang, Lichuan, Chongqing, Suining & Chengdu.	350-200	2078	2003-12-01	2014-07-01
Shanghai–Nanjing section	Shares tracks with the Beijing–Shanghai High-Speed Railway and Shanghai–Nanjing Intercity Railway.	350	301	2008-04-18; 2008-07-01	2010-07-01; 2011-06-30
Nanjing–Hefei section (Hefei–Nanjing railway)	Mixed passenger & freight HSR connecting Nanjing & Hefei	250	166	2005-06-11	2008-04-18
Hefei–Wuhan section (Hefei–Wuhan railway)	Mixed passenger & freight HSR connecting Hefei & Wuhan	250	351	2005-08-01	2008-12-31
(Wuhan)Hankou–Yichang section (Hankou–Yichang railway)	Mixed passenger & freight HSR connecting Wuhan & Yichang	200	293	2008-09-17	2012-07-01
Yichang–Lichuan section (Yichang–Wanzhou railway)	Mixed passenger & freight HSR connecting Yichang & Lichuan	200	377	2003-12-01	2014-07-01
Lichuan–Chongqing section (Chongqing–Lichuan railway)	Mixed passenger & freight HSR connecting Lichuan & Chongqing	200	264	2008-12-29	2013-12-28
Chongqing–Suining section (Suining–Chongqing railway)	Mixed passenger & freight HSR connecting Chongqing & Suining	200	132	2009-01-18	2009-09-29
Suining–Chengdu railway	Mixed passenger & freight HSR connecting Suining & Chengdu.	200	148	2005-05	2009-06-30

=== Shanghai–Nanjing ===
From Shanghai to Nanjing, the line uses the Beijing–Shanghai high-speed railway and the Shanghai–Nanjing intercity railway both lines have the designed speed of 350 km/h (220 mph).

=== Nanjing to Hefei ===
From Nanjing to Hefei, the line is called the Hefei–Nanjing railway. The Hefei–Nanjing Railway is shared with the Nanjing–Xi'an railway. It has a designed speed of 250 km/h (160 mph). At Hefei, a connection is available to the Hefei–Bengbu high-speed railway, which is a branch line of the Beijing–Shanghai high-speed railway, although both Shanghai-Chengdu Main Line and Hefei-Bengbu branch has now mostly used Hefei South Railway Station instead.

=== Hefei to Wuhan ===
From Hefei to Wuhan, the line is called the Hefei–Wuhan railway, with a designed speed of 250 km/h (160 mph). At Wuhan, a connection is available to the Beijing–Guangzhou–Shenzhen–Hong Kong high-speed railway, an important north-south railway line from Beijing to Guangzhou and Kowloon, Hong Kong, although Hankou Railway Station instead of Wuhan Station is on the main line.

=== Wuhan to Yichang ===
From Wuhan to Yichang, the line is called the Wuhan–Yichang railway.

=== Yichang to Chongqing ===
==== Yichang–Wanzhou railway ====
The Yichang–Wanzhou railway connects the cities of Yichang, Lichuan, and Wanzhou. The Shanghai–Wuhan–Chengdu passenger-dedicated line only uses the Yichang to Lichuan portion of the Yichang–Wanzhou Railway. (The actual splitting point of Yichang-Wanzhou and Chongqing-Lichuan railways is Liangwu railway station)

Due to harsh terrains some part of this section has a maximum speed of 140–160 km/h (87–99 mph), which is the lowest in China's high-speed network.

==== Chongqing–Lichuan railway ====
At Lichuan, the Chongqing–Lichuan railway connects it with the city of Chongqing.

=== Chongqing to Chengdu ===
==== Suining–Chongqing railway ====
The Suining–Chongqing railway connects the cities of Chongqing and Suining. Its designed operating speed is 200 km/h (120 mph).

==== Suining–Chengdu railway ====
The Suining–Chengdu railway connects the cities of Suining and Chengdu. Its designed operating speed is 200 km/h (120 mph). Until 2009, this line was considered to form part of the Dazhou–Chengdu railway.

==== Chengdu–Chongqing intercity railway ====
The newly constructed Chengdu–Chongqing intercity railway links Chengdu and Chongqing directly using a southern route (via Neijiang). This line is operated at 300–310 km/h (186–193 mph) which is much faster than the above two lines.

== Routing ==
While some sections of the line parallels existing conventional railways, others have been constructed on a new separate alignment, done to avoid difficult terrain, provide a more direct route or to serve areas where no rail service existed before. In particular, until the completion of the Shanghai–Nanjing intercity railway, passenger trains between Shanghai and Nanjing ran on the "conventional", but greatly upgraded, Jinghu railway; conventional railways likewise have long existed along fairly direct routes between Nanjing and Hefei, or between Chongqing and Chengdu.

On the other hand, the Hefei-Wuhan railway, which involved a significant amount of tunneling when passing through the Dabie Mountains, allowed to significantly shorten the railway distance between Nanjing and Wuhan. The Yichang-Lichuan-Wanzhou and Lichuan-Chongqing sections are routed through the mountainous areas of the southwestern Hubei and the eastern section Chongqing Municipality, where no railways or reliable highways previously existed, providing a much more direct rail connection between the Sichuan Basin and Eastern China than previously existing ones (such as the one using the older Xiangyu railway).
