= Hefei–Nanjing railway =

Railway line in China

Hefei-Nanjing railway Nanjing-Hefei section of Shanghai–Wuhan–Chengdu passenger-dedicated railway
- CRH logo
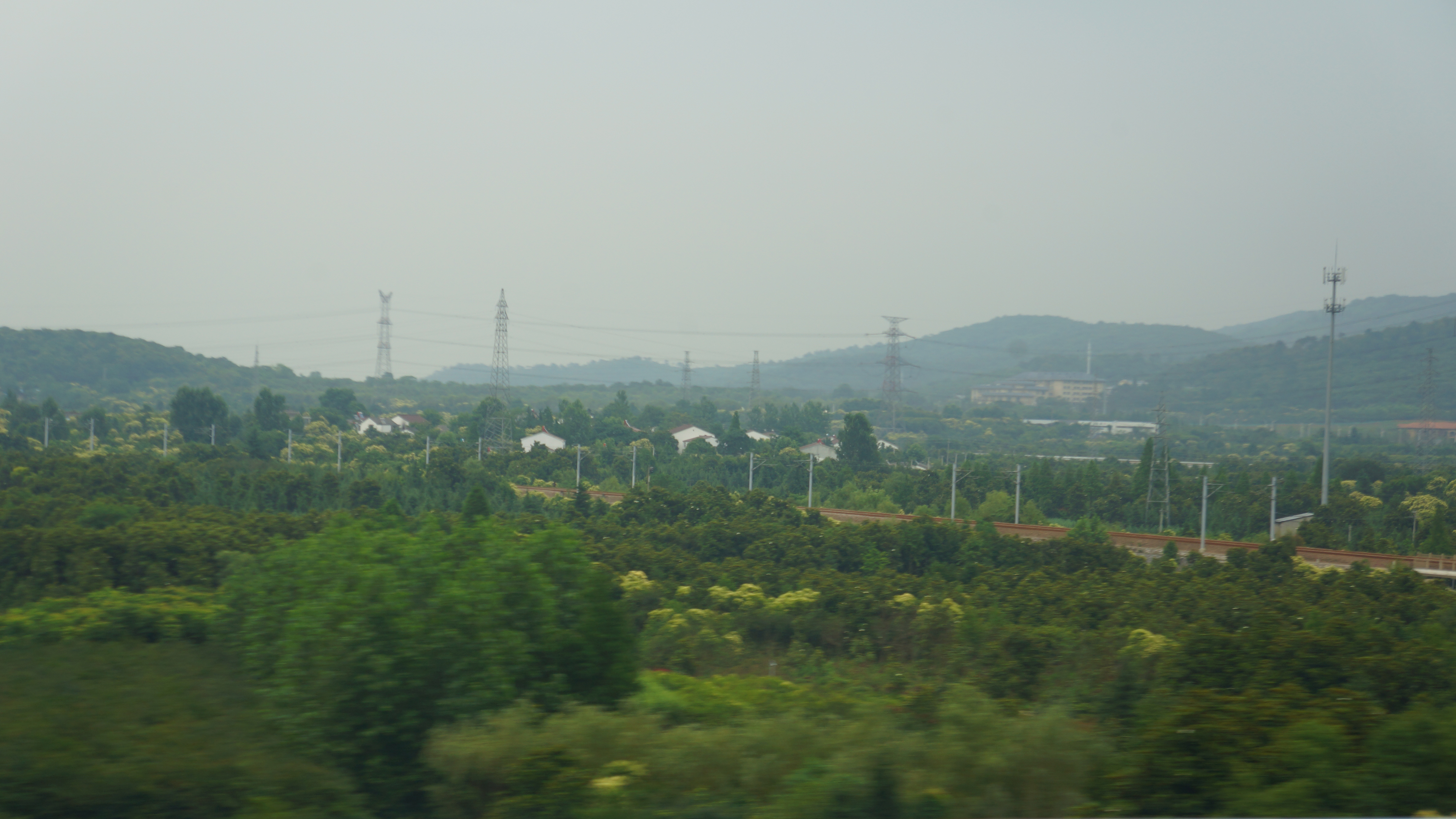
- Hefei-Nanjing Railway

Overview
- Other name: Hening railway
- Native name: 合宁铁路
- Status: Operational
- Locale: Anhui province; Jiangsu province
- Termini: Hefei South; Nanjing South
- Stations: 7

Service
- Type: High-speed rail Heavy rail
- System: China Railway High-speed

History
- Opened: April 18, 2008

Technical
- Line length: 156 km (97 mi)
- Number of tracks: 2 (Double-track)
- Track gauge: 1,435 mm (4 ft 8 1/2 in) standard gauge
- Electrification: 25 kV 50 Hz AC (Overhead line)
- Operating speed: 250 km/h (160 mph)

The Hefei–Nanjing railway also known as the Hening railway (simplified Chinese: 合宁铁路; traditional Chinese: 合寧鐵路; pinyin: Hé-Níng Tiělù) is a railway line in China, running from Hefei to Nanjing at 250 km/h (155 mph). The line is 166 km (103 mi) long and began service on April 18, 2008. High-speed trains on the line reduced travel time between Nanjing and Hefei from over three hours to 1.5 hours. The Hening Line forms part of the higher-speed Shanghai–Wuhan–Chengdu passenger-dedicated railway from Shanghai to Chengdu and the easternmost section of the Nanjing–Xi'an Railway. The faster Shanghai–Chongqing–Chengdu high-speed railway is under construction, including the parallel Shanghai–Suzhou–Huzhou high-speed railway (completed in 2024) and the Hefei South–Huzhou section of the Shangqiu–Hangzhou high-speed railway (completed in 2020). The railway is built to National Class I standards and can accommodate freight traffic, including double-stack rail transport.

The Shanghai–Nanjing–Hefei high-speed railway is a faster 350kph rated under construction line that parallels the Hening Railway, as part of the Shanghai–Chongqing–Chengdu high-speed railway.
