= Chuanshan, Suining =

Chuanshan 船山区
- District
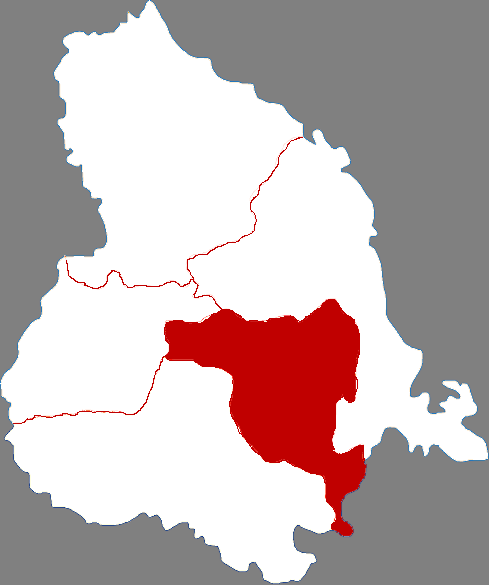
- Location of the county

- Location in Sichuan
- Coordinates: 30°30′14″N 105°33′11″E
- Country: China
- Province: Sichuan
- Prefecture-level city: Suining
- District seat: Nanjinlu Subdistrict

Area
  - Total: 618 km^{2} (239 sq mi)
- Elevation: 283 m (928 ft)

Population (2020)
  - Total: 832,863
  - Density: 1,350/km^{2} (3,490/sq mi)
- Time zone: UTC+8 (China Standard)
- Website: www.chuanshan.gov.cn

Chuanshan (Chinese: 船山; pinyin: Chuánshān) is a district of Suining, Sichuan Province, China. The district is the government seat of Suining city and also its main urban area. The population in 2012 was 700,000.

It was established in 2003 when the Shizhong District of Suining was split into Anju District and Chuanshan District.

== Administrative divisions ==
Chuanshan District administers 14 subdistricts, 9 towns, and 1 township:

- Nanjinlu Subdistrict (南津路街道)
- Kaixuanlu Subdistrict (凯旋路街道)
- Zhenjiangsi Subdistrict (镇江寺街道)
- Yucailu Subdistrict (育才路街道)
- Jiefulu Subdistrict (介福路街道)
- Jiahe Subdistrict (嘉禾街道)
- Guangde Subdistrict (广德街道)
- Fuyuanlu Subdistrict (富源路街道)
- Lingquan Subdistrict (灵泉街道)
- Ciyin Subdistrict (慈音街道)
- Jiulian Subdistrict (九莲街道)
- Nanqiang Subdistrict (南强街道)
- Xining Subdistrict (西宁街道)
- Yangdu Subdistrict (杨渡街道)
- Longfeng Town (龙凤镇)
- Renli Town (仁里镇)
- Yongxing Town (永兴镇)
- Hesha Town (河沙镇)
- Xinqiao Town (新桥镇)
- Guihua Town (桂花镇)
- Laochi Town (老池镇)
- Baosheng Town (保升镇)
- Beigu Town (北固镇)
- Tangjia Township (唐家乡)
