= Xiangyang–Chongqing railway =

Railway line in China

Xiangyang–Chongqing railway 襄渝铁路
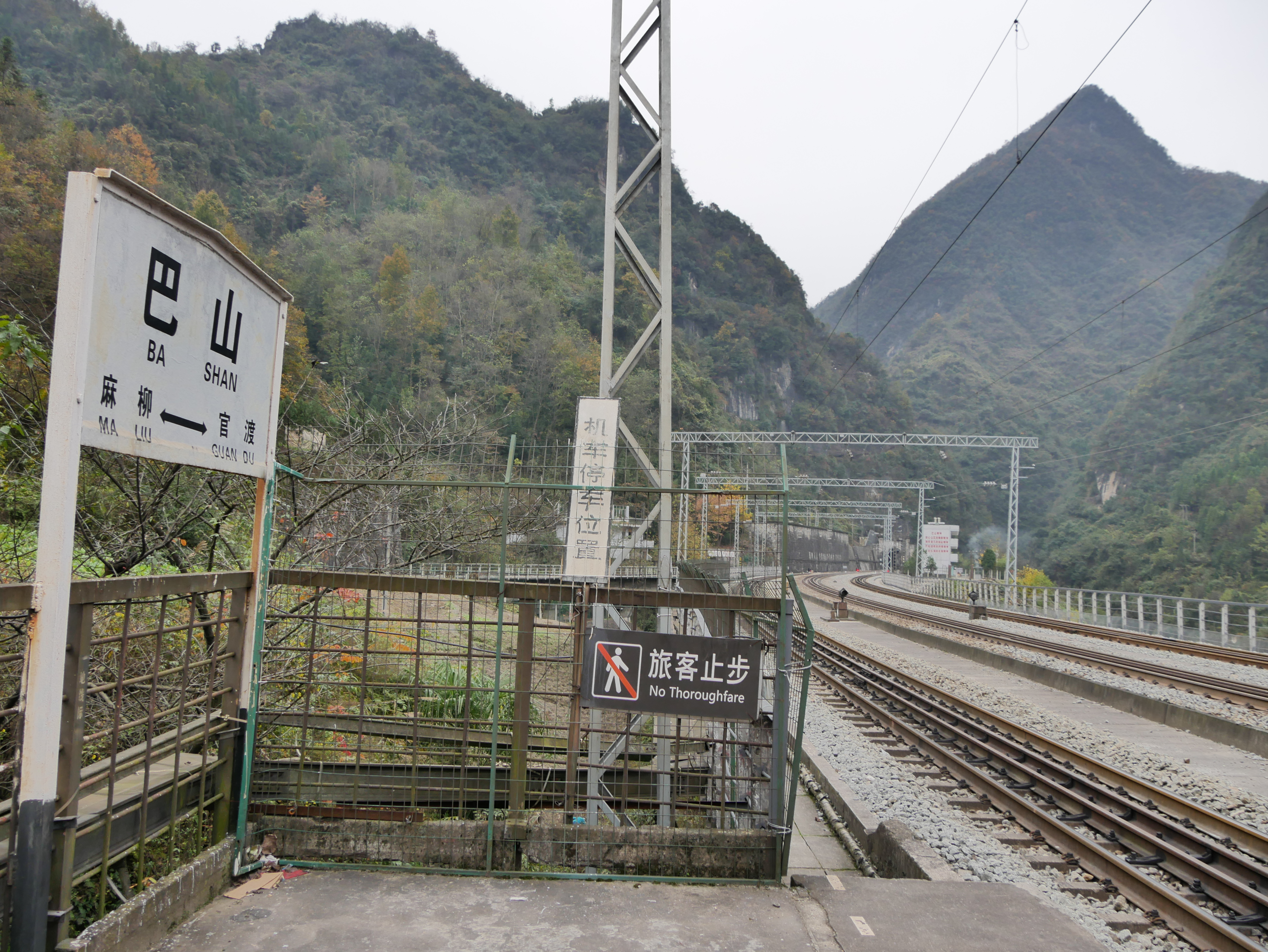
- Bashan railway station in Daba Mountains near the Sichuan-Shaanxi border

Overview
- Status: Operational
- Locale: Hubei, Shaanxi and Sichuan and Chongqing, China

Service
- Type: Heavy rail
- Operator(s): CR Wuhan, CR Xi'an, CR Chengdu

History
- Opened: 1 June 1978

Technical
- Line length: 899 km (559 mi)
- Number of tracks: 2
- Track gauge: 1,435 mm (4 ft 8 1/2 in)
- Electrification: 25 kV 50 Hz AC (Overhead line)
- Operating speed: 160 km/h (99 mph)
- Signalling: ABS

The Xiangyang–Chongqing railway or Xiangyu railway (襄渝铁路), also known as the Xiangfan-Chongqing railway and Xiangyu line (襄渝线), is a single-track electrified railroad in central China between the cities of Xiangyang, formerly known as Xiangfan, and Chongqing. The short form name for Chongqing is Yu (渝) and the railway is named after the two cities. It has a total length of 895.3 km and passes through Hubei, Shaanxi and Sichuan province, and Chongqing municipality. Major cities along route include Shiyan, Ankang, Dazhou and Guang'an.

The Xiangyu railway is a major transportation route that connects the Sichuan Basin with the Central Plains. It was built from 1964 to 1979, and electrified in three phases from 1980 to 1998. Trains running on the Xiangyu line can reach top speeds of 100–120 km/h. Construction of a second track began in 2005 and was completed in 2009.

== Second Xiangyu line ==
The second Xiangfan–Chongqing railway (襄渝二线) is a dual-track electrified railroad line that runs parallel to the Xiangyu line. This line is only 507 km in length and connects the same cities as the original Xiangyu line. It takes a more direct route through the mountainous terrain with bridges and tunnels, and accommodates faster trains (up to 160 km/h) and a greater carrying capacity. Construction began on August 13, 2005. and was scheduled to be completed by July 2008, but work was slowed by difficulties in bridge and tunnel work which pushed the project 30% over budget. The New Iron Mountain Tunnel (新铁山隧道), 3,347 m length, was completed on April 20, 2007 after 20 months of difficult work, overcoming interior rockslides and carbon monoxide build-up inside the tunnel.

The second Xiangyu line opened on October 31, 2009.

== Rail junctions ==
- Xiangyang: Jiaozuo–Liuzhou railway, Hankou–Danjiangkou railway
- Ankang: Xi'an–Ankang railway, Yangpingguan–Ankang railway
- Dazhou:Dazhou–Chengdu railway, Bazhong–Dazhou railway
- Chongqing: Chengdu–Chongqing railway, Chongqing–Huaihua railway, Sichuan–Guizhou railway, Suining–Chongqing railway

== Painting of the Xiangyu line ==
The Xiangyu line is the subject of an enormous landscape scroll painting that is 1.6 m wide and 128 m long. It was completed by Yang Migui in May 2008 who was a worker on the line's construction in the 1970s, and began working on the painting in 1998. It is reportedly the world's longest painting created by a single artist.

== See also ==
- List of railways in China
