= Suining–Chongqing railway =

Railway line in China

Suining–Chongqing railway Suining-Chongqing section of the Shanghai–Wuhan–Chengdu passenger railway corridor

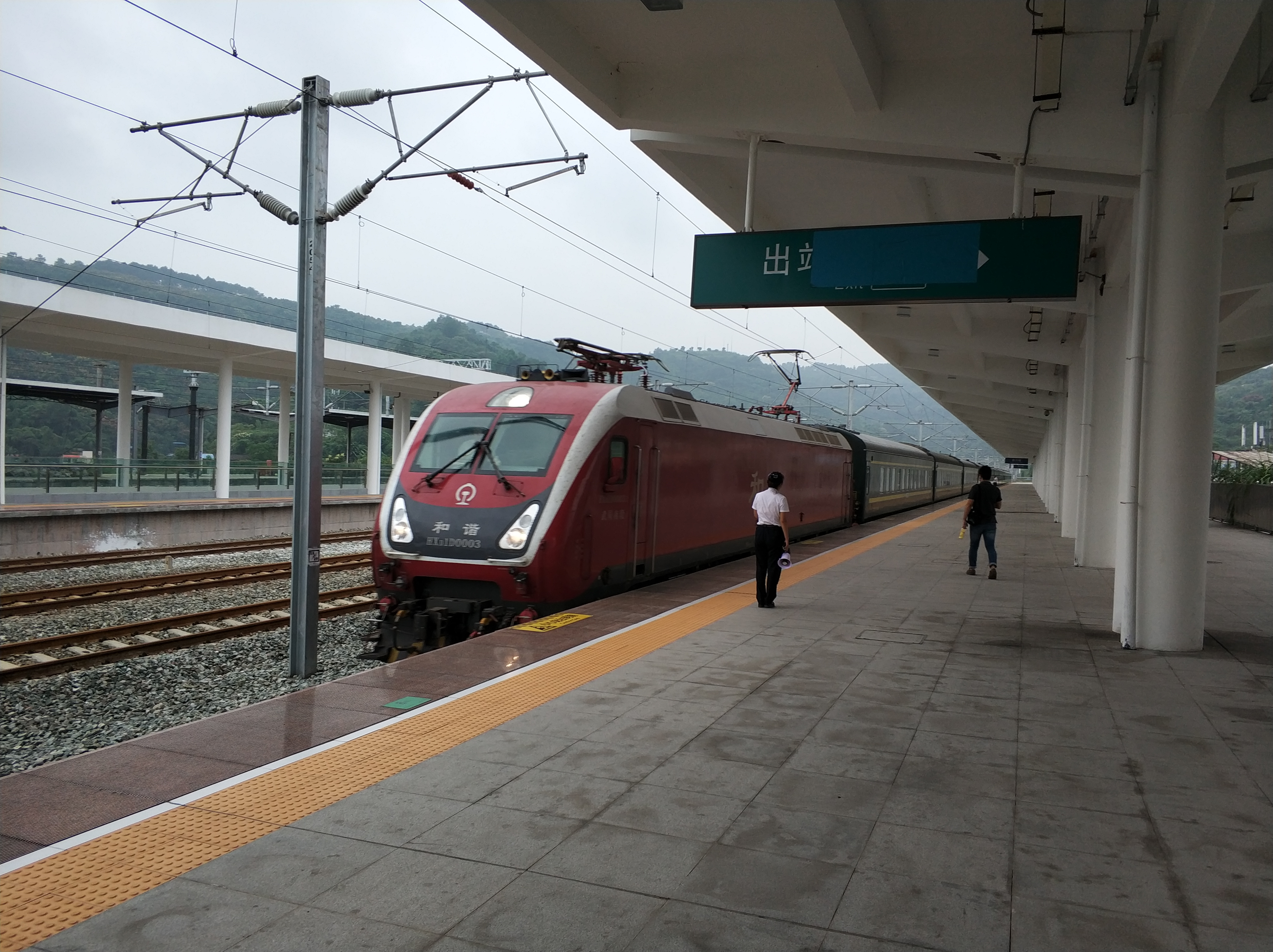

Overview
- Native name: 遂渝铁路
- Status: Operational
- Owner: CR Chengdu
- Locale: Chongqing; Sichuan province
- Termini: Chongqing North; Suining
- Stations: 10

Service
- Type: High-speed rail Heavy rail
- System: China Railway High-speed
- Operator: CR Chengdu

History
- Opened: April 1, 2006

Technical
- Line length: 259.5 km (161 mi)
- Number of tracks: 2 (Double-track)
- Track gauge: 1,435 mm (4 ft 8 1/2 in) standard gauge
- Electrification: 25 kV 50 Hz AC (Overhead line)
- Operating speed: 200 km/h (124 mph)

Chongqing-Suining Railway
- Simplified Chinese: 遂渝铁路
- Traditional Chinese: 遂渝鐵路
Transcriptions
Standard Mandarin
- Hanyu Pinyin: Suìyú Tiělù

Suining–Chongqing railway is a high-speed railway connecting Chongqing and Suining, Sichuan as part of the Shanghai–Wuhan–Chengdu high-speed railway. It is also known as Suiyu railway, following the Chinese practice of combining the shortened version of the terminal city's name. It is a national grade I railway with two electrified lines, with a designed maximum speed of 200 km (120 mi), although maximum operating speed is currently 160 km/h.

== Overview ==
The railway has a total length of 128 km (80 mi), 31 km (19 mi) of which is in Sichuan Province and 97 km (60 mi) within Chongqing Municipality. It is classed as a national railway grade I, with two electrified lines, designed for maximum speed of 250 kilometers. The second stage of the railway on December 31, 2012 officially launched operations.

== History ==
Suiyu railway commenced with a ground-breaking ceremony on February 25, 2003. Stage one of track laying across the board was completed on April 23, 2005. Stage one was opened on April 1, 2006 after a total investment of 4.925 billion yuan. Suining–Chongqing railway is one of China's high-speed rail project pilot projects, building China 's first track test section for ballastless high-speed trains for a length of 13.16 km (8.18 mi). The trial was commenced in September 2004, taking until January 2007 to complete the test.

During May 2005, Suiyu railway trains reached a top speed of 225 km/h (140 mph) in testing. The railway is part of Chengyu high-speed railway and achieved connection with the railway from Chengdu to Suining. The combined operating distance from Chongqing to Chengdu is only 312 km (194 mi), the entire running time of about 2 hours. On September 26, 2009, at Chongqing North Railway Station started services bound for Chengdu with CRH1 Harmony EMU trainsets, allowing Southwest China to enter the high-speed rail era.

The second stage of the Suining–Chongqing railway line has a length of 131 km (81 mi), of which 37 km (23 mi) is in Sichuan Province, 95 km (59 mi) in Chongqing Municipality. This saw the creation of Suinan South station and a new alignment from Aikawa to Shizhishan. Work on this upgrade commenced on January 18, 2009, with construction lasting for four years. This stage of the project was estimated to need a total investment of 4.81 billion yuan. Chongqing railway new tier on January 24, 2013, officially launched operation.
