= Suining =

Suining 遂宁市 Sui-ning
- Prefecture-level city
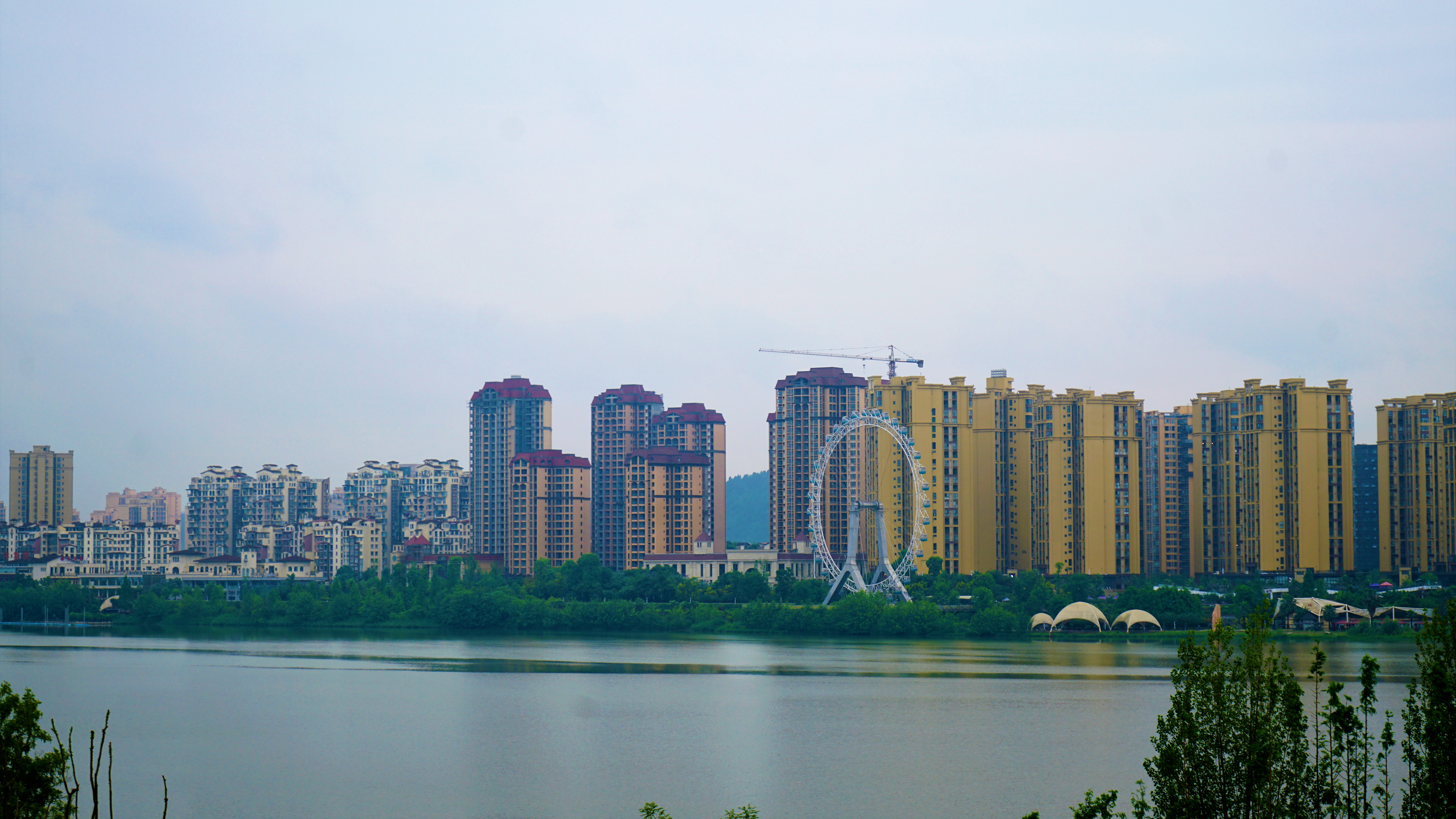

- Location of Suining in Sichuan
- Coordinates (Suining municipal government): 30°31′59″N 105°35′35″E
- Country: People's Republic of China
- Province: Sichuan
- Prefecture-level city established: February 1985
- Municipal seat: Chuanshan District

Government
  - CPC Secretary: Li Jiang
  - Mayor: Liu Huiyin

Area
  - Prefecture-level city: 5,326 km^{2} (2,056 sq mi)

Population (2020 census)
  - Prefecture-level city: 2,814,196
  - Density: 528.4/km^{2} (1,369/sq mi)
  - Metro: 1,612,641

GDP
  - Prefecture-level city: CN¥ 91.6 billion US$ 14.7 billion
  - Per capita: CN¥ 27,868; US$ 4,474
- Time zone: UTC+8 (China Standard)
- Postal code: 629000
- Area code: (0)825
- ISO 3166 code: CN-SC-09
- Licence Plate Prefixes: 川J

Suining (simplified Chinese: 遂宁; traditional Chinese: 遂寧; Sichuanese Pinyin: Xu^{4}nin^{2}; Sichuanese pronunciation: [ɕy˨˦nin˨˩]; pinyin: Suìníng; Wade–Giles: Sui-ning) is a prefecture-level city of eastern Sichuan province in Southwest China. According to the 2020 census, Suining had a population of 2,814,196, with 1,612,641 living in built up(or metro) areas.

== Geography and climate ==
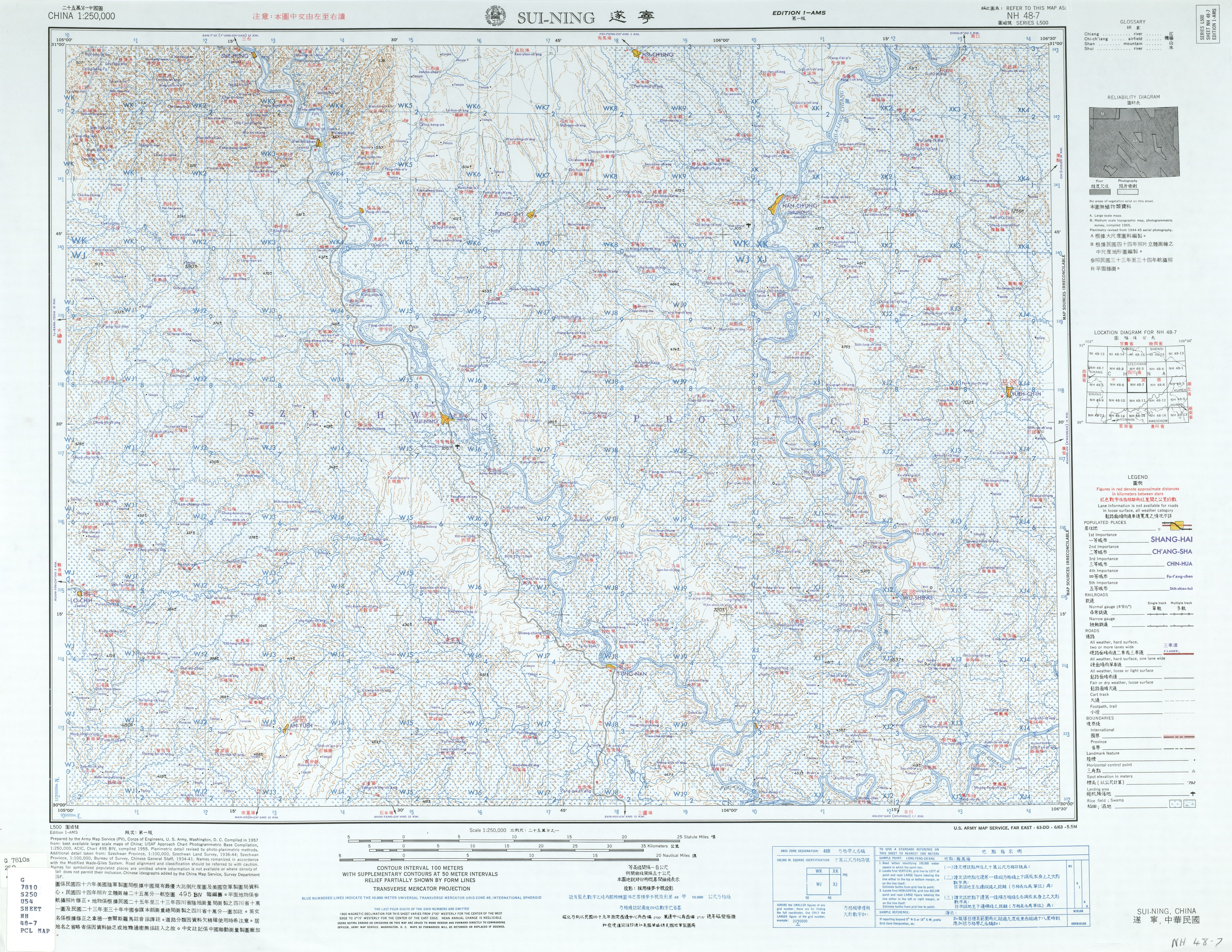
Map including Suining (labeled as 遂寧 SUI-NING) (AMS, 1957)

Suining is located in the center of the Sichuan Basin and on the central reaches of the Fu River, bordering Chongqing, Guang'an and Nanchong to the east, Neijiang and Ziyang to the south, the provincial capital of Chengdu to the west, and Deyang and Mianyang to the north. Its prefecture, or administrative, area ranges in latitude from 30° 10' 50" to 31° 10' 50" N, or 108.9 kilometres (67.7 mi) and in longitude from 105° 03' 26" to 106° 59' 49" E, or 90.3 kilometres (56.1 mi). While much of the prefecture is mountainous, the urban area itself, which occupies 40 square kilometres (15 sq mi), is located on flat land.

Suining has a monsoon-influenced humid subtropical climate (Köppen Cwa) and is largely mild and humid, with four distinct seasons. Winter is short, mild, and foggy, though actual precipitation is low. January averages 6.6 °C (43.9 °F), and while frost may occur, snow is rare. Summers are long, hot and humid, with the daily average in July and August around 27 °C (81 °F), with August being slightly warmer. Rainfall is light in winter and can be heavy in summer, and 75% of the annual total occurs from May to September.

Climate data for Suining, elevation 355 m (1,165 ft), (1991–2020 normals, extremes 1971–present)
Month	Jan	Feb	Mar	Apr	May	Jun	Jul	Aug	Sep	Oct	Nov	Dec	Year
Record high °C (°F)	19.3 (66.7)	23.2 (73.8)	32.3 (90.1)	35.0 (95.0)	37.1 (98.8)	36.4 (97.5)	41.2 (106.2)	42.7 (108.9)	40.1 (104.2)	33.7 (92.7)	26.2 (79.2)	18.5 (65.3)	42.7 (108.9)
Mean daily maximum °C (°F)	9.7 (49.5)	12.9 (55.2)	17.9 (64.2)	23.6 (74.5)	27.1 (80.8)	29.2 (84.6)	32.0 (89.6)	32.2 (90.0)	27.0 (80.6)	21.2 (70.2)	16.5 (61.7)	10.8 (51.4)	21.7 (71.0)
Daily mean °C (°F)	6.6 (43.9)	9.2 (48.6)	13.5 (56.3)	18.5 (65.3)	22.1 (71.8)	24.7 (76.5)	27.4 (81.3)	27.2 (81.0)	22.9 (73.2)	17.8 (64.0)	13.1 (55.6)	8.0 (46.4)	17.6 (63.7)
Mean daily minimum °C (°F)	4.3 (39.7)	6.6 (43.9)	10.3 (50.5)	14.7 (58.5)	18.4 (65.1)	21.4 (70.5)	24.0 (75.2)	23.6 (74.5)	20.1 (68.2)	15.5 (59.9)	10.7 (51.3)	6.0 (42.8)	14.6 (58.3)
Record low °C (°F)	−3.1 (26.4)	−2.1 (28.2)	−0.7 (30.7)	3.4 (38.1)	9.1 (48.4)	13.8 (56.8)	18.2 (64.8)	16.9 (62.4)	13.5 (56.3)	2.9 (37.2)	0.7 (33.3)	−3.8 (25.2)	−3.8 (25.2)
Average precipitation mm (inches)	14.0 (0.55)	16.2 (0.64)	30.4 (1.20)	59.2 (2.33)	95.8 (3.77)	168.8 (6.65)	187.7 (7.39)	148.7 (5.85)	111.8 (4.40)	71.3 (2.81)	26.5 (1.04)	13.5 (0.53)	943.9 (37.16)
Average precipitation days (≥ 0.1 mm)	7.9	7.2	9.3	10.6	12.8	13.9	12.0	10.7	13.5	14.4	8.7	7.1	128.1
Average snowy days	1.0	0.4	0	0	0	0	0	0	0	0	0	0.3	1.7
Average relative humidity (%)	82	78	74	73	73	79	79	76	81	85	83	84	79
Mean monthly sunshine hours	36.4	49.2	88.3	123.5	125.7	107.7	154.6	164.1	92.7	58.8	49.9	27.3	1,078.2
Percentage possible sunshine	11	16	24	32	30	26	36	40	25	17	16	9	24
Source 1: China Meteorological Administrationall-time July high
Source 2: Weather China

== Places of interest ==
According to local legend, Suining is the Hometown of Guanyin and her sisters. A folk song declares that one resides at Lingquan Temple, another at Guangde Temple, while only the third sister is afar, in the Putuo Mountains of Southern China.

There exists Lingquan Temple, Guangde Temple, and the Dead Sea, which are regarded as the 4A scenic zone. And there is also a Celadon Museum of Sichuan, which is referred to as a 3A scenic zone.

The percentage of land-covered forests of Suining is approximately 34%, it's the first Provincial Environmental Protection City in Sichuan. The 30,000-capacity Suining Sports Centre Stadium is located in the city. The stadium opened in 2014 and it is used mostly for football matches.

== Administrative divisions ==
Map
Name	Hanzi	Hanyu Pinyin	Population (2020)	Area (km^{2})	Density (/km^{2})
Chuanshan District	船山区	Chuánshān Qū	822,863	618	1,331
Anju District	安居区	Ānjū Qū	431,310	1,258	343
Pengxi County	蓬溪县	Péngxī Xiàn	430,344	1,251	344
Shehong	射洪市	Shèhóng Shì	732,380	1,496	490
Daying County	大英县	Dàyīng Xiàn	387,299	703	551

== Transport ==
=== Highway ===
- China National Highway 318

=== Rail ===
Suining is the junction for the Dazhou–Chengdu and Suining–Chongqing Railways, which collective form the westernmost section of the Shanghai–Wuhan–Chengdu High-Speed Railway.

== Well-known inhabitants ==
- Chen Zi'ang, Tang dynasty poet (661–702), was a native of the Suining area.
- Chen Wei, a pro-democracy activist born in 1969 who has been arrested in February 2011 and sentenced to 9 years in prison on December 23, 2011 for "inciting subversion of state power" by the Suining intermediate people's court.
- Liu Xianbin, a pro-democracy activist born in 1968 who has been arrested in June 2010 and sentenced to 10 years in prison for inciting subversion of state power.
- Li Bifeng, a pro-democracy activist and friend of Liao Yiwu who is facing 5 years in prison for "economic crimes".
- Ju Jingyi, a well-known Chinese singer and actress. She rose to fame as a member of Chinese idol girl group SNH48 and was part of Team NII until her graduation in December 2017.

== Cuisine ==
Pengxi Iron Cake: Mix rice flour with egg whites and lard to form a cake batter. Pour the batter into a baking bowl and wait until it turns golden brown and tempting. Then, use a thin iron skewer to gently loosen the cake along the edge and place it in a paper bag.

Liangfen (cold mung bean jelly) is seasoned with more than ten ingredients, including sesame oil, vinegar, chili, garlic juice, and fine salt.

Pengxi Ginger Cake: It is a pastry made by carefully combining ingredients that are medicinal herbs with medicinal and health-promoting effects.

Chuanshan Tofu Skin: Chuanshan tofu skin is glossy, with a fine texture, soft and smooth, tender and elastic, and has a fragrant and soft texture.
