= Neijiang North railway station =

Railway station in Neijiang, Sichuan

Neijiang North 内江北站
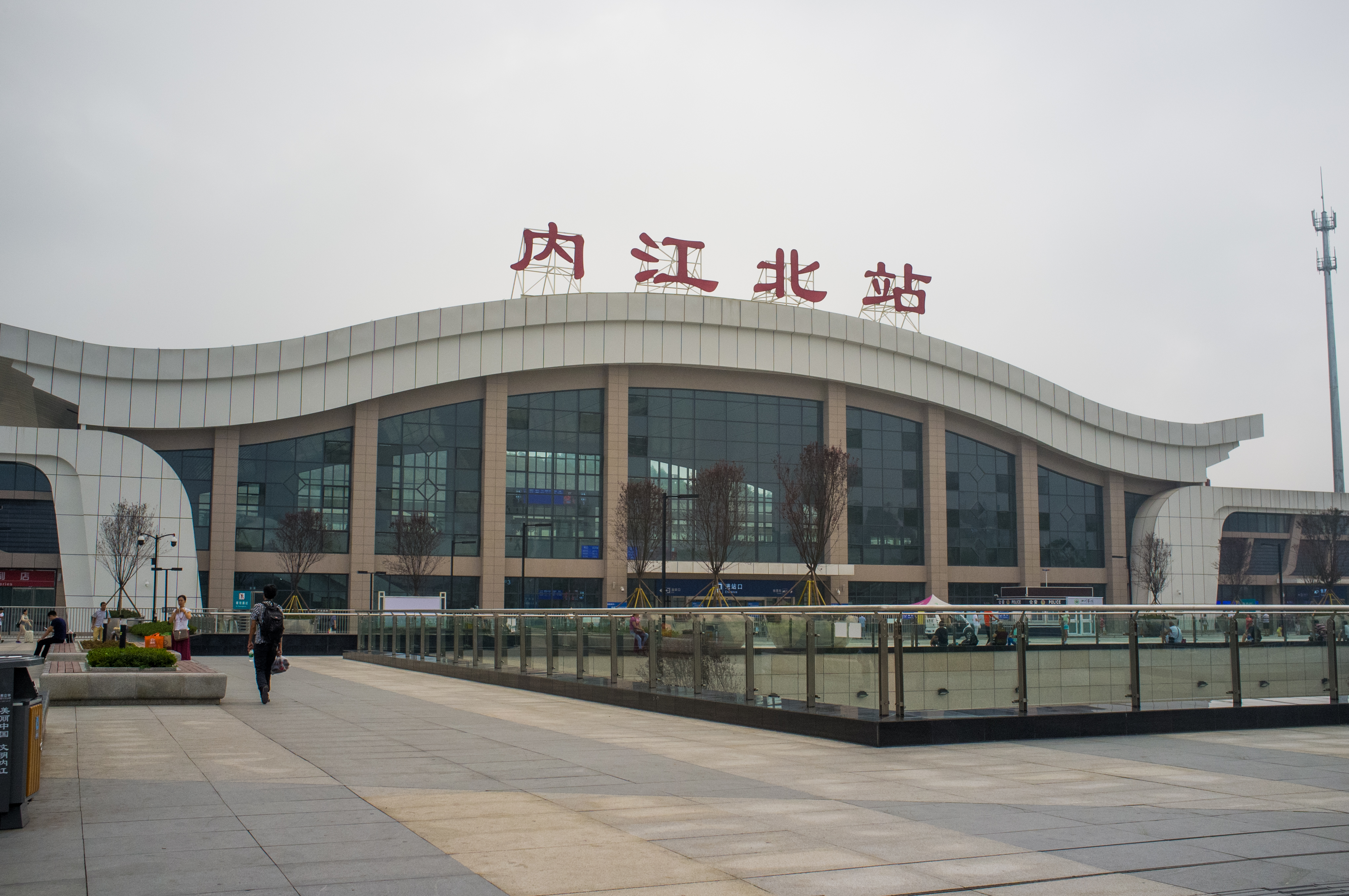

General information
- Location: Dongxing District, Neijiang, Sichuan; China
- Coordinates: 29.6118°N 105.0814°E
- Line(s): Chengdu–Chongqing intercity railway Mianyang–Luzhou high-speed railway Mianyang–Neijiang high-speed railway (planned)
- Platforms: 6

History
- Opened: 26 December 2015

Neijiang North railway station (Chinese: 内江北站) is a railway station in Dongxing District, Neijiang, Sichuan, China. It is one of three operational railway stations in Neijiang and the first to be served by high-speed services.

Neijiang railway station is served by conventional trains on the Chengdu–Chongqing railway and the Neijiang–Kunming railway.

== History ==
Neijiang North railway station opened on 26 December 2015. In its first year of operation there were 2.21 million passengers.

Preceding station	China Railway High-speed	Following station
Zizhong North towards Chengdu	Chengdu–Chongqing intercity railway	Longchang North towards Shapingba or Chongqing West
