= Zizhong railway station =

Railway station in Neijiang, China

Coordinates: 29°46′15.28″N 104°51′41.33″E

Zizhong 资中

General information
- Location: Zizhong County, Neijiang, Sichuan; China
- Operator: Chengdu Railway Bureau, China Railway Corporation
- Line: Chengdu–Chongqing Railway

History
- Opened: 1953
Location

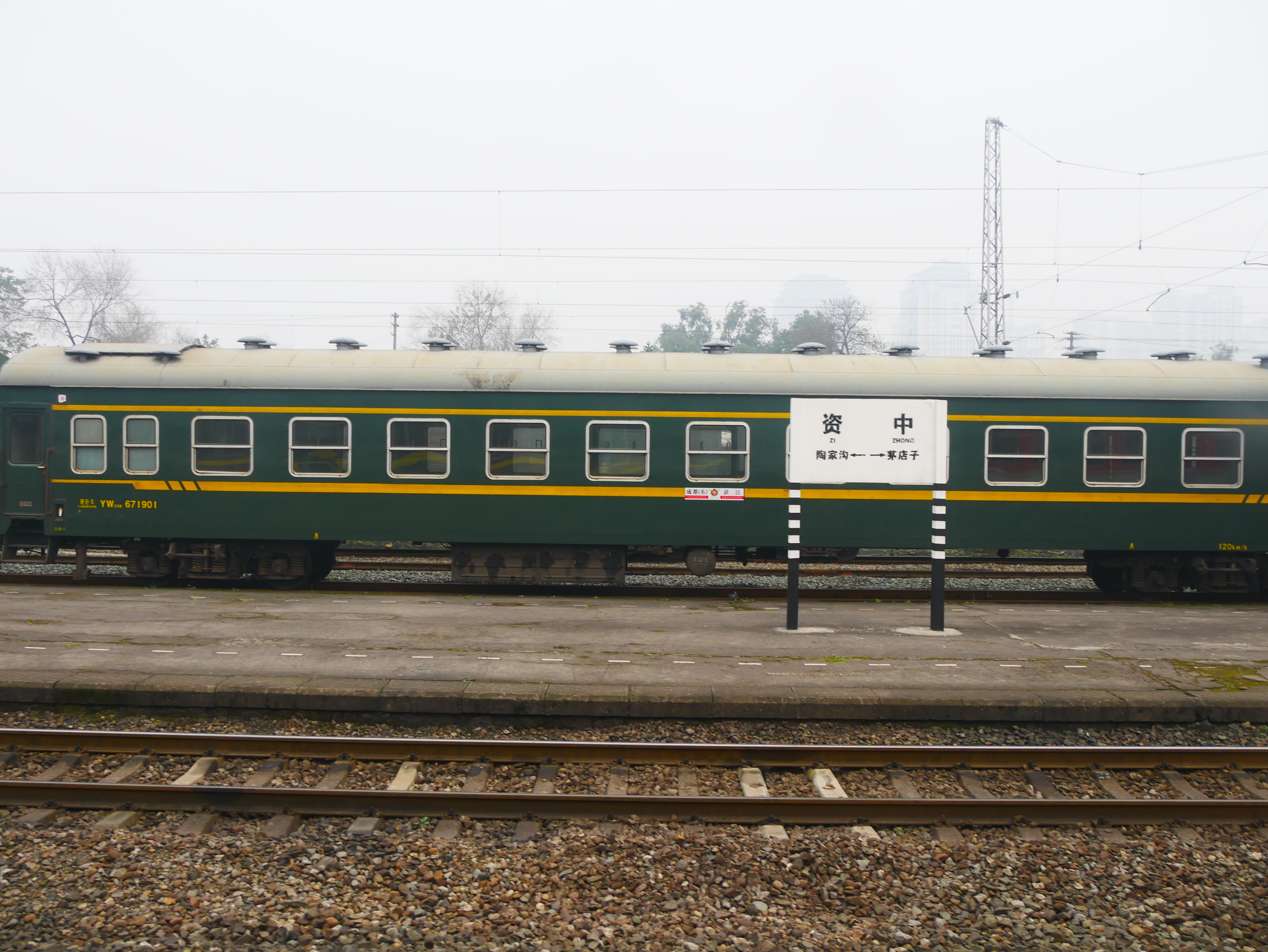
Zizhong station platform

The Zizhong railway station (Chinese: 资中站; pinyin: Zī Zhōng Zhàn) is a railway station of Chengdu–Chongqing Railway. The station is located in Zizhong County, Neijiang, Sichuan, China.

== See also ==
- Chengdu–Chongqing Railway

Preceding station	China Railway	Following station
Taojiagou towards Chengdu	Chengdu–Chongqing railway	Maodianzi towards Chongqing
