= Rongchang railway station =

Railway station in Chongqing, China

Coordinates: 29°23′51.61″N 105°34′39.83″E

Rongchang railway station 荣昌站
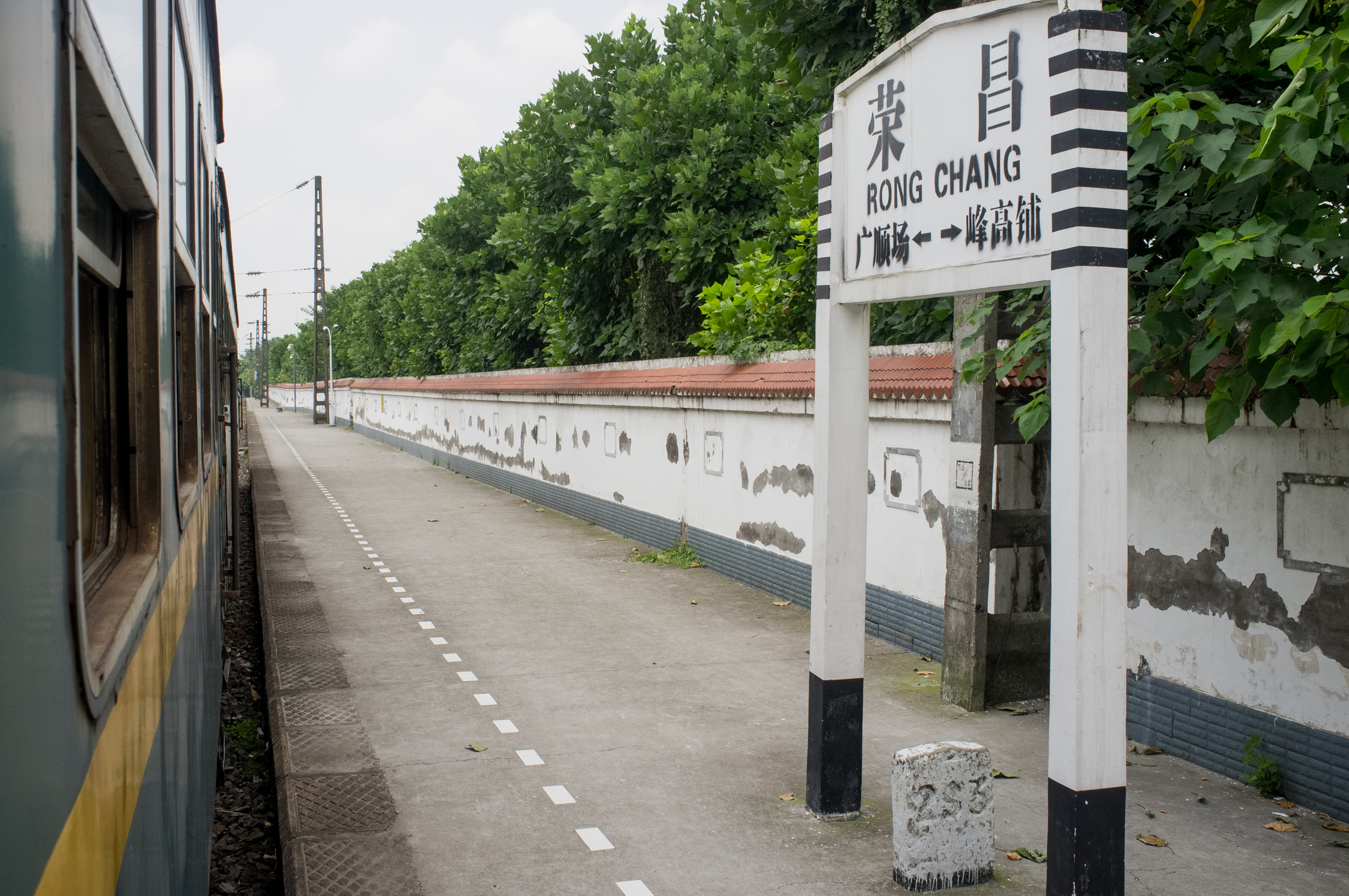

General information
- Other names: Changzhou
- Location: Rongchang District, Chongqing; China
- Operated by: China Railway Chengdu Group
- Line: Chengdu–Chongqing railway

History
- Opened: 1952
Location

Rongchang railway station (Chinese: 荣昌站; pinyin: Róngchāng Zhàn) is a railway station under the control of China Railway Chengdu Group. The station is located in Rongchang, Chongqing.

Preceding station	China Railway	Following station
Guangshunchang (广顺场站) towards Chengdu	Chengdu–Chongqing railway	Fenggaopu (峰高铺站) towards Chongqing
