= Jianyang railway station =

Railway station in Ziyang, China

Coordinates: 30.3791°N 104.5532°E

Jianyang 简阳
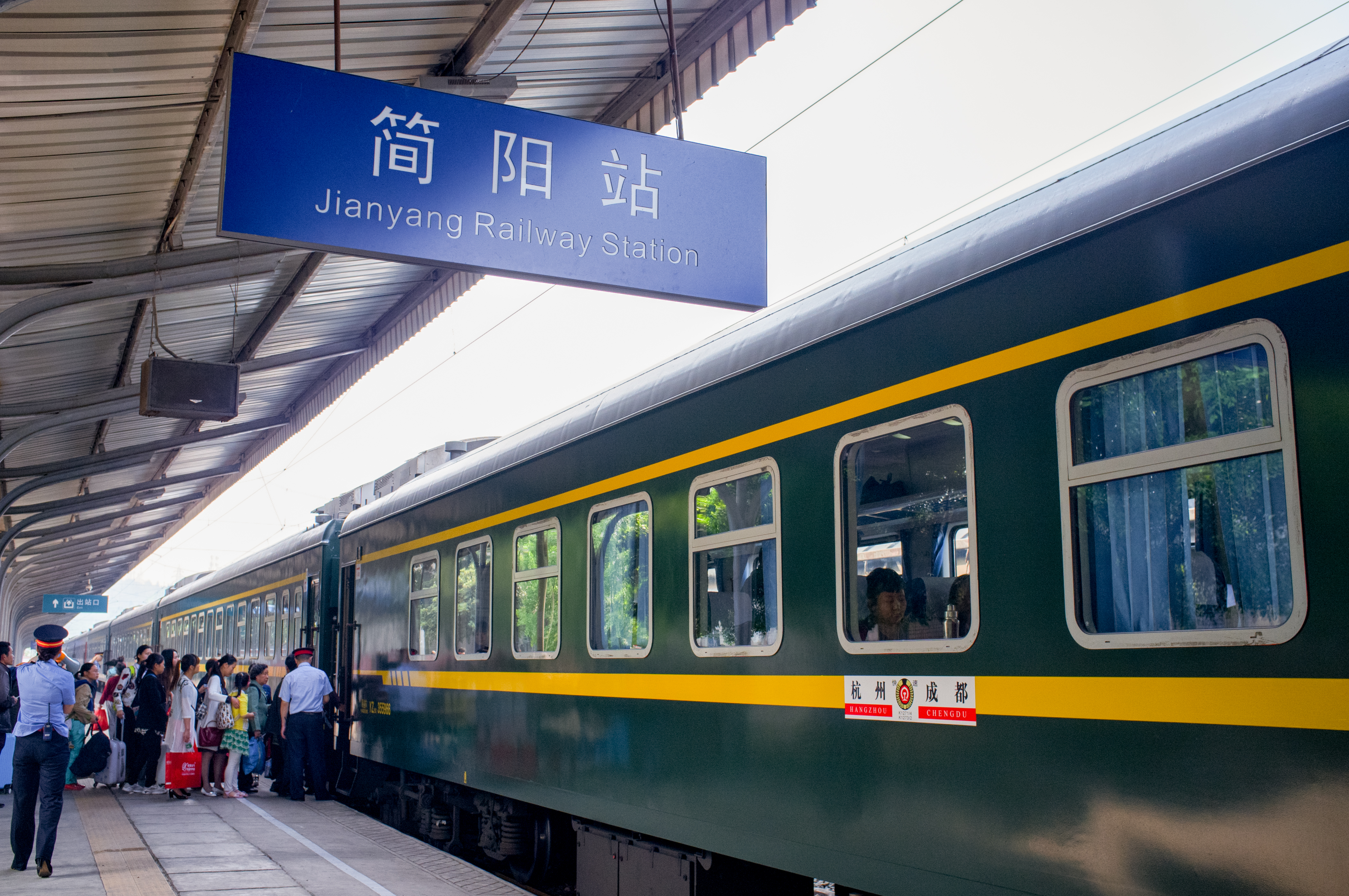

General information
- Location: Jianyang, Ziyang, Sichuan; China
- Operator: Chengdu Railway Bureau, China Railway Corporation
- Line: Chengdu–Chongqing Railway

History
- Opened: 1953
Location

The Jianyang railway station (Chinese: 简阳站; pinyin: Jiǎn Yáng Zhàn) is a railway station of Chengdu–Chongqing Railway. The station is located in Jianyang, Ziyang, Sichuan, China.

== See also ==
- Chengdu–Chongqing Railway

| Preceding station | China Railway | Following station |
|---|---|---|
| Shiqiaozhen towards Chengdu | Chengdu–Chongqing railway | Miaozigou towards Chongqing |
