= Yongchuan railway station =

Railway station in Chongqing, China

Yongchuan 永川
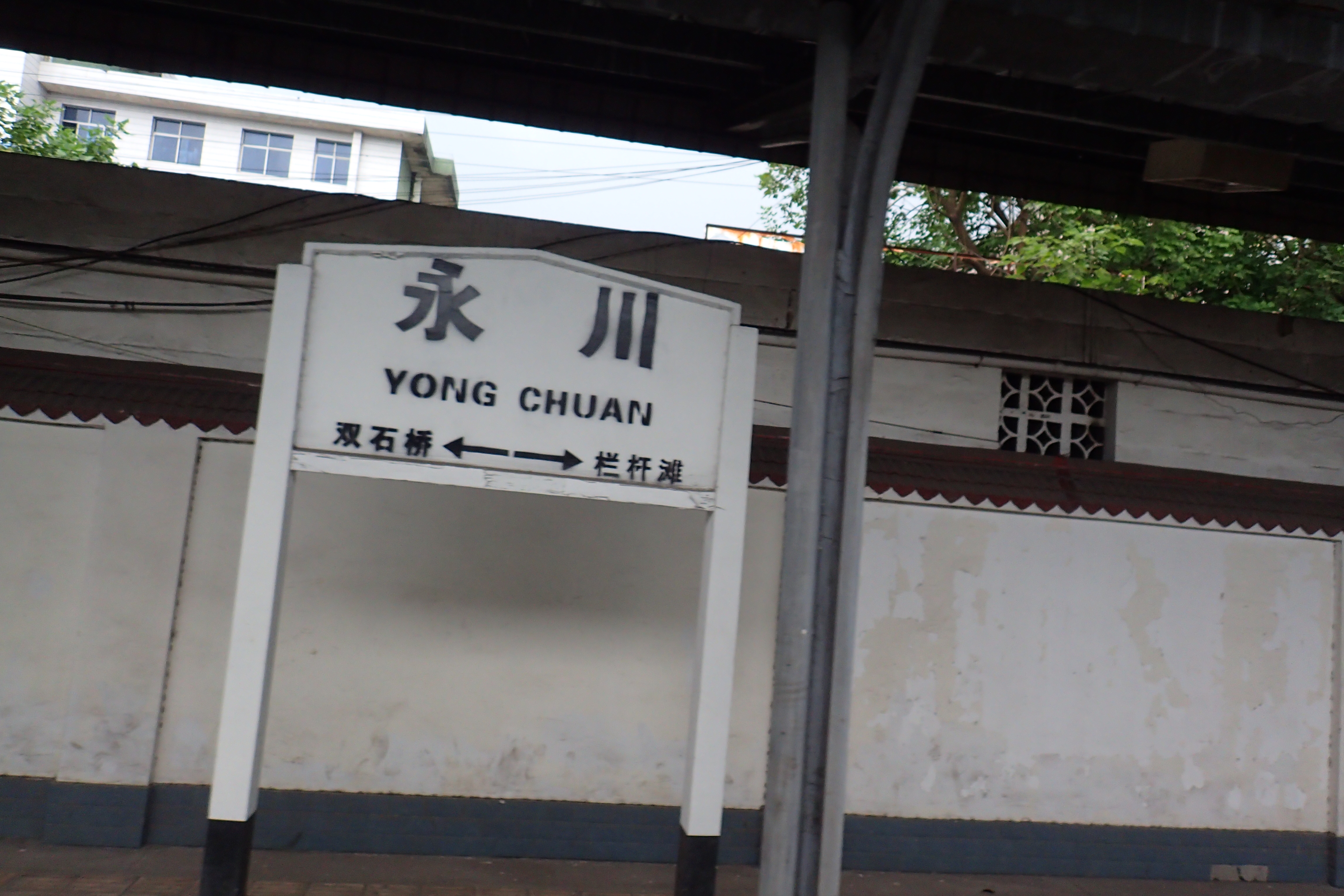
- Station sign

General information
- Location: Yongchuan District, Chongqing; China
- Operated by: Chengdu Railway Bureau, China Railway Corporation
- Line: Chengdu–Chongqing railway

History
- Opened: 1953; 73 years ago

The Yongchuan railway station (Chinese: 永川站; pinyin: Yǒng chuān Zhàn) is a railway station on the Chengdu–Chongqing railway. The station is located in Yongchuan District, Chongqing, China.

It is used primarily to transport freight.

== See also ==
- Chengdu–Chongqing railway

Preceding station	China Railway	Following station
Shuangshiqiao towards Chengdu	Chengdu–Chongqing railway	Langantan towards Chongqing
