= Neijiang railway station =

Railway station in Neijiang, China

Coordinates: 29.5909°N 105.0339°E

Neijiang 内江
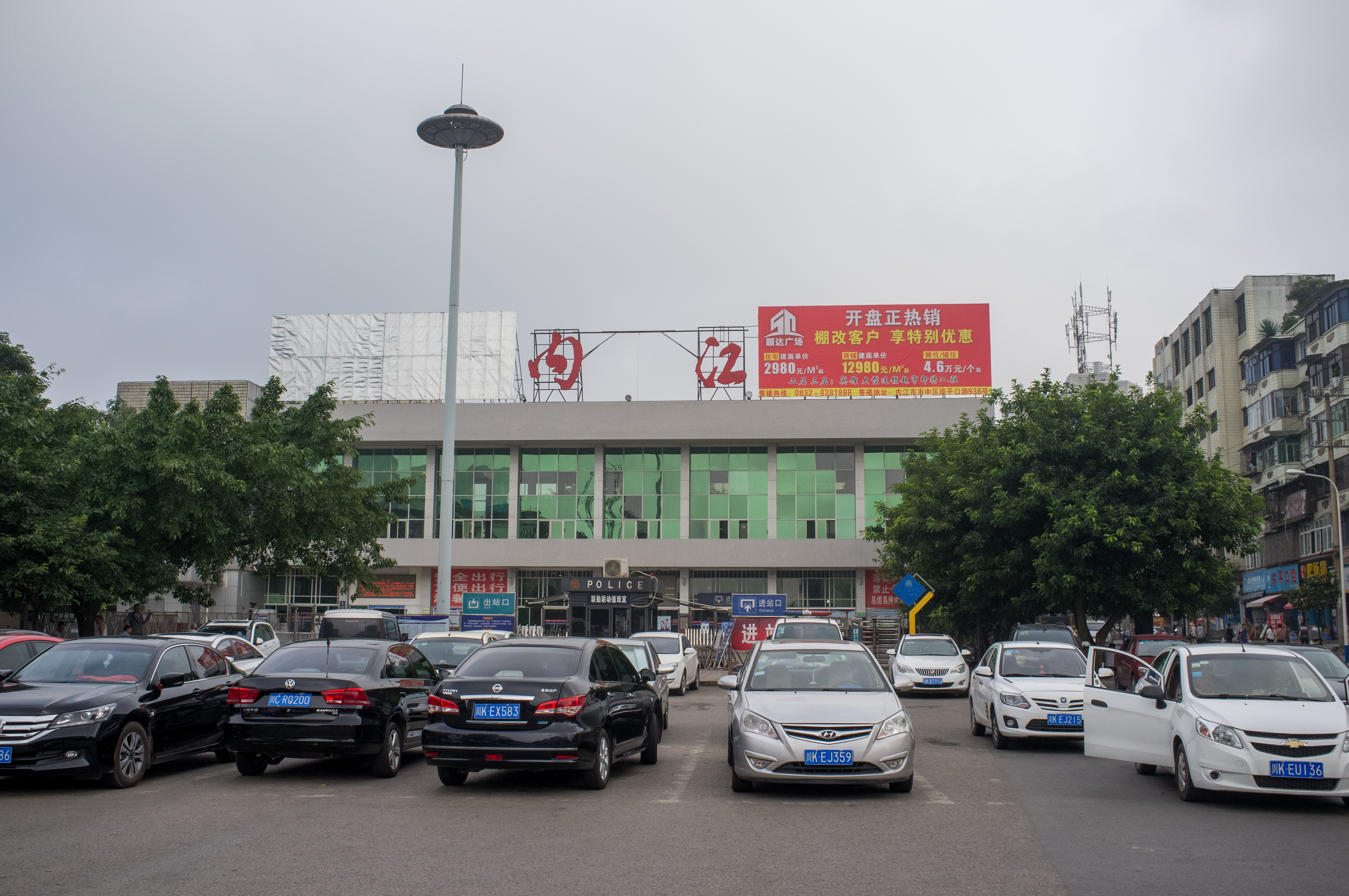
- Neijiang Station of Chengdu-Chongqing Railway, China

General information
- Location: Shizhong District, Neijiang, Sichuan; China
- Operator: Chengdu Railway Bureau, China Railway Corporation
- Line: Chengdu–Chongqing Railway

History
- Opened: 1953
Location

The Neijiang railway station (simplified Chinese: 内江站; traditional Chinese: 內江站; pinyin: Nèijiāng Zhàn) is a railway station of the Chengdu–Chongqing Railway. The station is located in Neijiang, Sichuan province.

It is one of two stations in Neijiang, the other being Neijiang North on the Chengdu–Chongqing intercity railway.

== See also ==
- Chengdu–Chongqing Railway

Preceding station	China Railway	Following station
Shijiaxiang towards Chengdu	Chengdu–Chongqing railway	Neijiang East towards Chongqing
