= Bishan SkyShuttle =

Rubber-tyred metro system in Chongqing, China

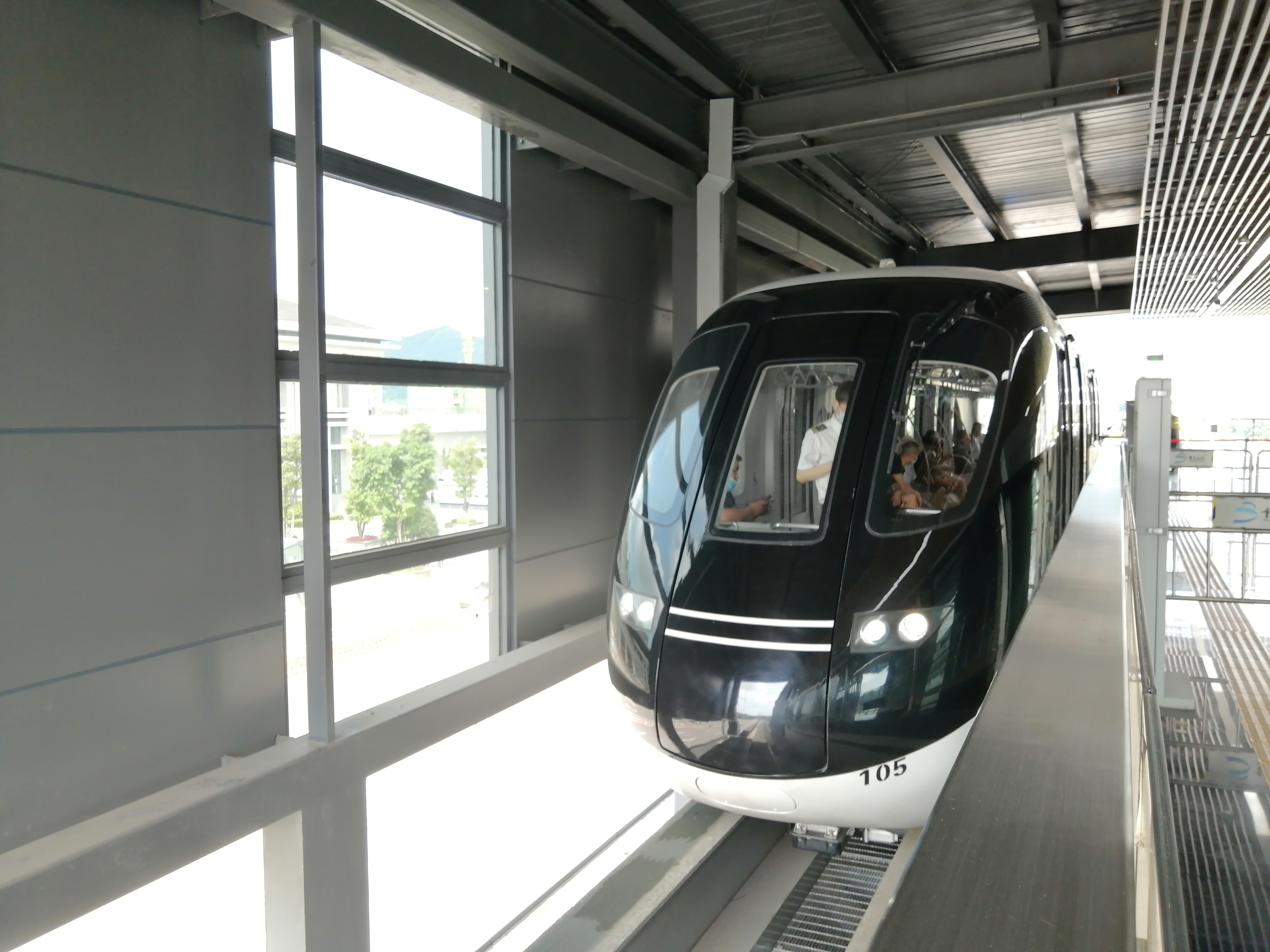
- A Bishan SkyShuttle train

Overview
- Termini: Chengyu Railway Station; Subway Line 1
- Stations: 15

Service
- Type: Rapid transit
- System: Chongqing Rail Transit

History
- Opened: 16 April 2021; 5 years ago

Technical
- Line length: 15.4 km (9.6 mi)
- Operating speed: 80 km/h (50 mph)

The Bishan rubber-tyred metro (Chinese: 璧山胶轮有轨电车), or Bishan SkyShuttle (Chinese: 云巴; pinyin: Yún Bā; lit. 'Cloud Bus'), is an elevated rubber-tyred metro line in Bishan District, Chongqing, China. The 15.4-kilometre (9.6 mi) long line has 15 stations. It runs from north to south, starting at Bishan station on Line 1 of Chongqing Rail Transit, and finishing at Bishan railway station, on the Chengdu–Chongqing intercity railway.

In 2021, the line served total 1.6701 million passengers with a daily average of 6,195 passengers and risen to 3.93 million passengers in 2025.

== History ==
Construction began on 22 February 2019. The line opened on 16 April 2021.

== Stations ==
Station name		Connections	Distance km	Location
English	Chinese	Connections	Distance km	Location
Chengyu Railway Station	成渝高铁站	Chengyu Passenger Railway		Bishan
Shapo	沙坡			Bishan
Gaoguanyin	高观音			Bishan
Liujiazui	刘家嘴			Bishan
Lianhuahu	莲花湖			Bishan
Shuangyu	双鱼			Bishan
Jujin Avenue	聚金大道			Bishan
Children's Park	儿童公园			Bishan
Dongyue Park	东岳公园			Bishan
Xiushuiwan	秀水湾			Bishan
Xiuhu Park	秀湖公园			Bishan
Qiancengyan	千层岩			Bishan
Jingshan Road	景山路			Bishan
Kechuang Town	科创小镇			Bishan
Subway Line 1	1号地铁站	Line 1 Line Bitong 27		Bishan

== Fares ==
Currently, fares are priced according to distance travelled. Maximum fares for full journey costs 4 RMB.

Distance (km)	Fares (RMB)
0~6	2 RMB for first 6 km (3.7 mi)
6~11	+1 RMB
11~17	+1 RMB

Due to operating and maintenance cost are rising, fares chart may be adjusted according to 1 of 2 plans:

Plan 1

Distance (km)	Fares (RMB)
0~4	2 RMB for first 4 km (2.5 mi)
4~8	+1 RMB
8~12	+1 RMB
12~16	+1 RMB

Plan 2

Distance (km)	Fares (RMB)
0~6	3 RMB for first 6 km (3.7 mi)
6~11	+1 RMB
11~17	+1 RMB

== Technology ==
Route of Bishan SkyShuttle

BYD's SkyShuttle system (Chinese: 云巴; pinyin: Yún Bā; lit. 'Cloud Bus') is used. The vehicles are driverless and can reach a maximum speed of 80 kilometres per hour (50 mph). This line is the first SkyShuttle installation to open to the public. It should not be confused with another product (SkyRail) of BYD Company which is monorail.
