= Bishan railway station =

Railway station in Chongqing, China

Bishan 璧山
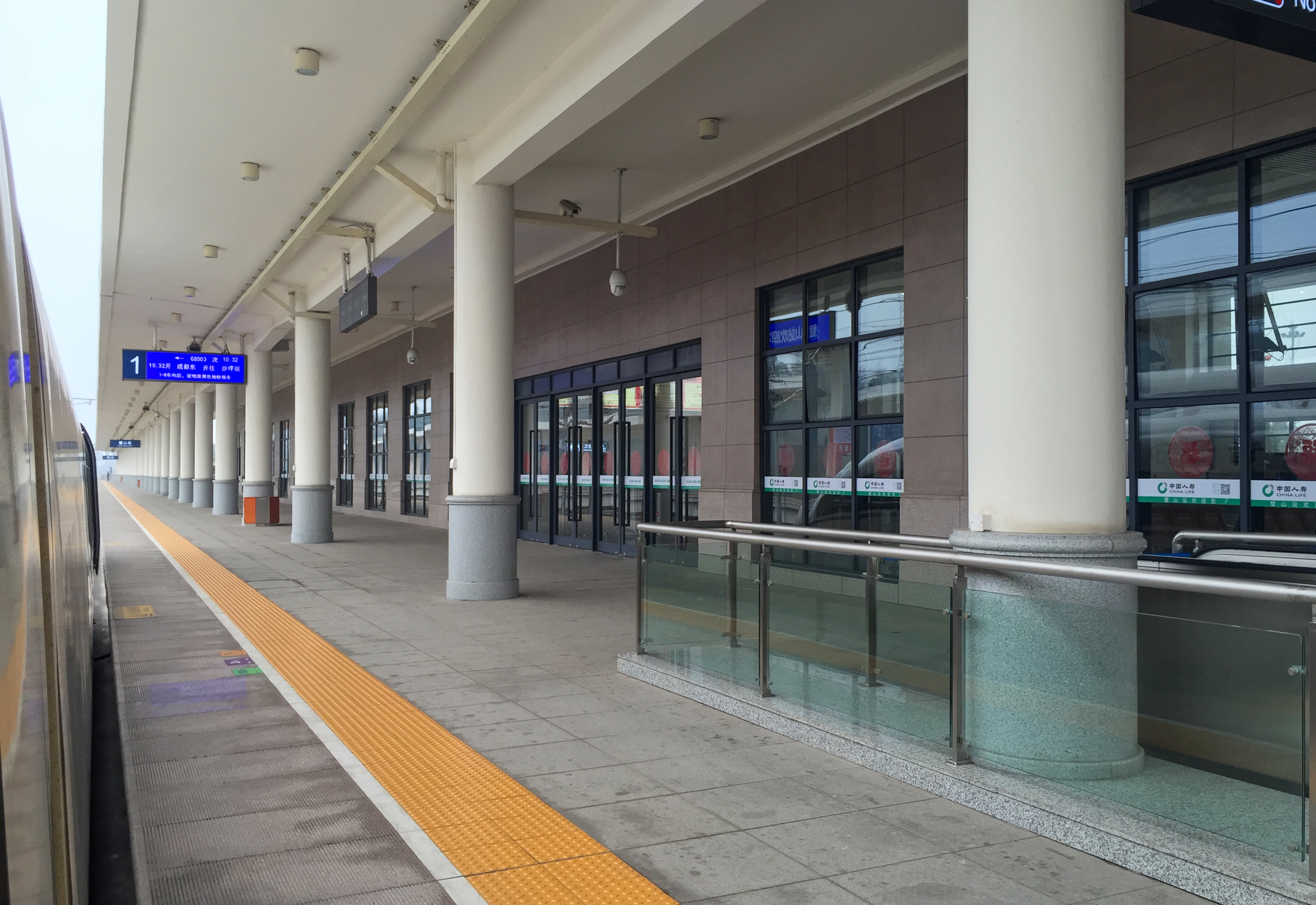
- Platform of Bishan Railway Station

General information
- Location: Qinggang Subdistrict, Bishan, Chongqing; China
- Coordinates: 29°31′N 106°13′E
- Line: Chengdu–Chongqing intercity railway
- Platforms: 2
- Connections: Bishan SkyShuttle

History
- Opened: December 26, 2015
Location

Bishan railway station is a railway station of Chengdu–Chongqing intercity railway located in Qinggang Subdistrict, Bishan, Chongqing, China. Construction began on 29 December 2013. It was opened on 26 December 2015 which brought an end to the time when Bishan District had no rail transport system or a comprehensive transfer hub.

The transport hub covers an area of 150 acres and cost approximately 530 million yuan. It functions as a transfer hub for long-distance coaches, buses, taxis and private vehicles.

== Connections ==
The railway station is connected to the southern terminus of the Bishan rubber-tyred tram.

| Preceding station | China Railway High-speed | Following station |
|---|---|---|
| Yongchuan East towards Chengdu | Chengdu–Chongqing intercity railway | Shapingba towards Shapingba or Chongqing West |
| Terminus | Chengdu–Chongqing intercity railway | Chongqing West towards Shapingba or Chongqing West |
