= Neijiang =

Neijiang 内江市 Nei-chiang, Neikiang
- Prefecture-level city
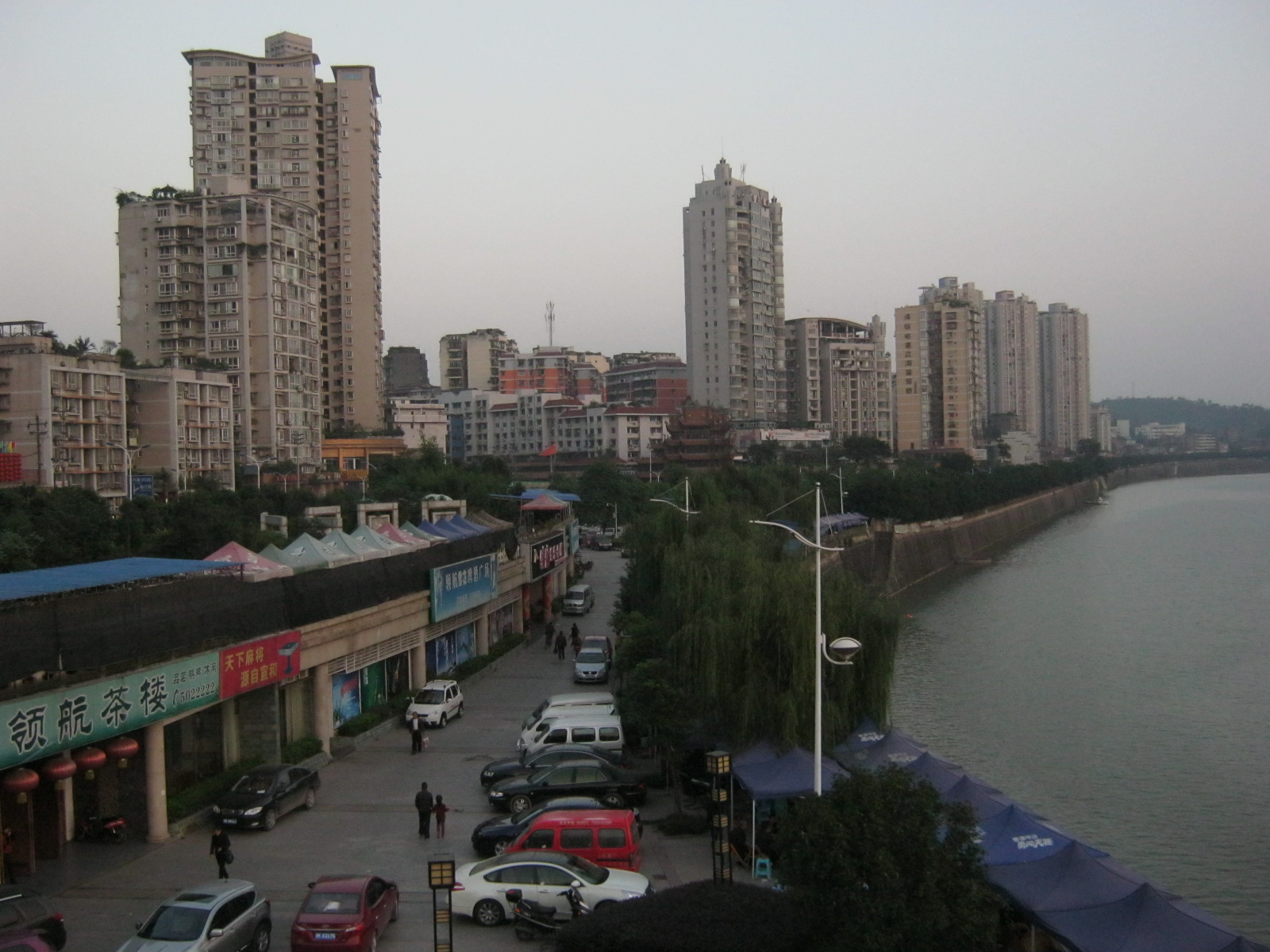
- Neijiang in 2012

- Location of Neijiang in Sichuan
- Coordinates (Neijiang municipal government): 29°34′49″N 105°03′29″E
- Country: People's Republic of China
- Province: Sichuan
- Municipal seat: Shizhong District

Area
  - Prefecture-level city: 5,385.33 km^{2} (2,079.29 sq mi)
  - Urban: 1,568.1 km^{2} (605.4 sq mi)
  - Metro: 1,568.1 km^{2} (605.4 sq mi)

Population (2020 census)
  - Prefecture-level city: 3,140,678
  - Density: 583.191/km^{2} (1,510.46/sq mi)
  - Urban: 1,179,140
  - Urban density: 751.95/km^{2} (1,947.6/sq mi)
  - Metro: 1,179,140
  - Metro density: 751.95/km^{2} (1,947.6/sq mi)

GDP
  - Prefecture-level city: CN¥ 119.9 billion US$ 19.2 billion
  - Per capita: CN¥ 32,081; US$ 5,151
- Time zone: UTC+8 (China Standard)
- Postal code: 641000
- ISO 3166 code: CN-SC-10
- Website: www.neijiang.gov.cn

Neijiang (simplified Chinese: 内江; traditional Chinese: 內江; Sichuanese Pinyin: Nui^{4}jiang^{1}; Sichuanese pronunciation: [nuei˨˩˧tɕiaŋ˥]; pinyin: Nèijiāng; Wade–Giles: Nei-chiang) is a prefecture-level city in the southeast of Sichuan province, People's Republic of China. It is located on the Tuo River, midway between the two major cities of Chengdu and Chongqing, is a transportation and food-processing center. The population of the entire prefecture was 3,140,678 at the 2020 census, and the population of the built-up (metro) area was 1,179,140 in the 2 urban districts of Shizhong and Dongxing.

== History ==
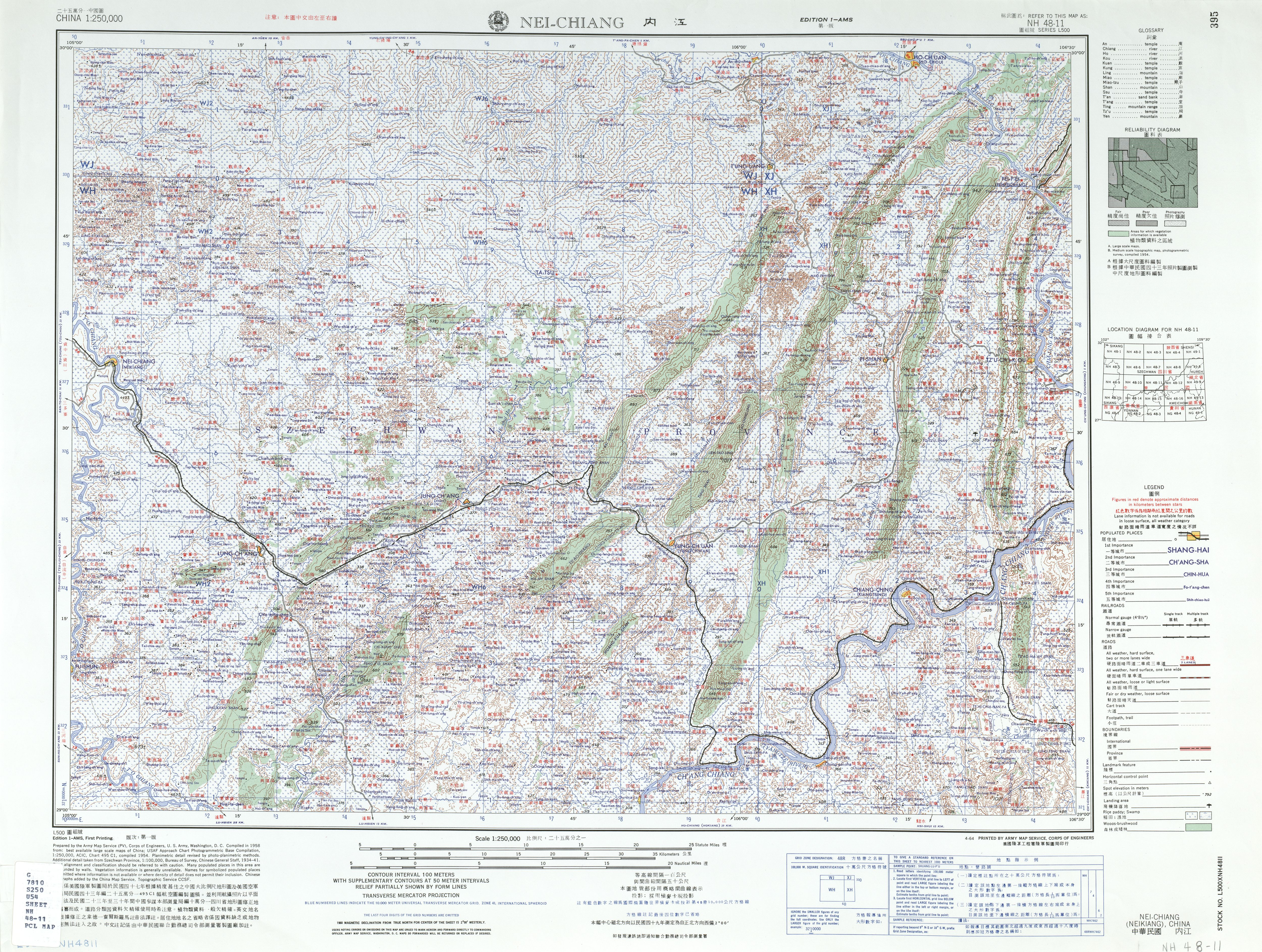
Map including Neijiang (labeled as 內江 NEI-CHIANG (NEIKIANG)) (AMS, 1958)

In medieval times the locality was an important salt-producing area, but in recent times its name has been associated with the cultivation of sugarcane; it is commonly referred to as the sugar capital (甜城) of Sichuan. During the economic boom of China in the 1990s and early 21st century, Neijiang has been transformed and its industries now range from engineering, electronics, chemicals, construction materials, to consumer goods. It is also the home of Neijiang Normal College and many other educational institutions. Its geographic location puts it in the center of the southern Sichuan transport network. Neijiang is also the hometown of Zhang Daqian, one of the best-known and most prodigious Chinese artists of the twentieth century.

== Administrative divisions ==
Map
#	Name	Hanzi	Hanyu Pinyin	Population (2010)	Area (km^{2})	Density (/km^{2})
1	Shizhong District	市中区	Shìzhōng Qū	501,285	388	1,292
2	Dongxing District	东兴区	Dōngxīng Qū	749,810	1,181	635
3	Longchang City	隆昌市	Lóngchāng Shì	633,210	794	797
4	Weiyuan County	威远县	Wēiyuǎn Xiàn	626,482	1,289	486
5	Zizhong County	资中县	Zīzhōng Xiàn	1,192,060	1,734	687

== Climate ==
Climate data for Neijiang (Dongxing District), elevation 350 m (1,150 ft), (1991–2020 normals, extremes 1981–present)
Month	Jan	Feb	Mar	Apr	May	Jun	Jul	Aug	Sep	Oct	Nov	Dec	Year
Record high °C (°F)	19.0 (66.2)	23.9 (75.0)	32.6 (90.7)	34.9 (94.8)	36.7 (98.1)	38.0 (100.4)	40.9 (105.6)	43.8 (110.8)	39.4 (102.9)	32.4 (90.3)	25.2 (77.4)	18.3 (64.9)	43.8 (110.8)
Mean daily maximum °C (°F)	10.1 (50.2)	13.6 (56.5)	18.9 (66.0)	23.9 (75.0)	27.4 (81.3)	28.9 (84.0)	32.1 (89.8)	32.0 (89.6)	27.0 (80.6)	21.5 (70.7)	16.8 (62.2)	11.3 (52.3)	22.0 (71.5)
Daily mean °C (°F)	7.0 (44.6)	9.7 (49.5)	14.1 (57.4)	18.7 (65.7)	22.2 (72.0)	24.4 (75.9)	27.1 (80.8)	26.8 (80.2)	22.8 (73.0)	18.0 (64.4)	13.3 (55.9)	8.3 (46.9)	17.7 (63.9)
Mean daily minimum °C (°F)	4.8 (40.6)	7.0 (44.6)	10.7 (51.3)	14.9 (58.8)	18.4 (65.1)	21.3 (70.3)	23.6 (74.5)	23.3 (73.9)	20.2 (68.4)	15.9 (60.6)	11.2 (52.2)	6.3 (43.3)	14.8 (58.6)
Record low °C (°F)	−2.4 (27.7)	−0.8 (30.6)	1.4 (34.5)	5.7 (42.3)	9.6 (49.3)	15.0 (59.0)	17.4 (63.3)	16.8 (62.2)	13.9 (57.0)	8.3 (46.9)	0.8 (33.4)	−2.4 (27.7)	−2.4 (27.7)
Average precipitation mm (inches)	14.6 (0.57)	13.6 (0.54)	32.0 (1.26)	62.6 (2.46)	91.8 (3.61)	179.2 (7.06)	189.2 (7.45)	157.0 (6.18)	120.6 (4.75)	60.4 (2.38)	24.7 (0.97)	13.0 (0.51)	958.7 (37.74)
Average precipitation days (≥ 0.1 mm)	9.4	6.7	9.5	12.8	14.1	15.6	12.6	11.7	14.9	15.7	9.4	8.6	141
Average snowy days	0.4	0	0	0	0	0	0	0	0	0	0	0.2	0.6
Average relative humidity (%)	85	79	75	76	76	83	82	81	86	88	86	86	82
Mean monthly sunshine hours	34.6	55.5	102.0	122.0	129.2	100.0	160.2	164.7	86.8	54.6	47.7	34.5	1,091.8
Percentage possible sunshine	11	18	27	31	31	24	38	41	24	16	15	11	24
Source: China Meteorological Administration all-time extreme temperatureAll-time Jun Record lowall-time July high

== Population ==
According to the 2010 Sixth National Population Census, Neijiang had a registered population of 4,278,501 and a resident population of 3,702,847. Compared with the Fifth National Population Census, the resident population decreased by 457,458 over ten years, a decline of 11.0%, with an average annual decrease of 1.16%. Among the resident population, there were 1,878,205 males (50.72%) and 1,824,642 females (49.28%), with a sex ratio of 102.94 males per 100 females. By age group, 615,740 people were aged 0–14 (16.63%), 2,648,468 were aged 15–64 (71.53%), and 438,639 were aged 65 and above (11.84%).

By the end of 2017, Neijiang's registered population was 4.1473 million, a decrease of 53,300 from the previous year. The birth rate was 10.67‰, the death rate 10.93‰, and the natural population growth rate -0.26‰. The resident population at year-end was 3.7537 million, an increase of 6,700 from the previous year. The urbanization rate reached 47.9%, up 1.2 percentage points from the previous year.

According to the 2020 Seventh National Population Census, Neijiang's resident population was 3,140,678. Compared with 3,702,847 in the Sixth Census, it decreased by 562,169 over ten years, a decline of 15.18%, with an average annual growth rate of -1.63%. Among the population, 1,578,533 were male (50.26%) and 1,562,145 were female (49.74%), with a sex ratio of 101.05 males per 100 females. The population aged 0–14 was 488,236 (15.55%), those aged 15–59 numbered 1,859,882 (59.22%), and those aged 60 and above totaled 792,560 (25.24%), including 629,108 aged 65 and above (20.03%). Urban residents numbered 1,572,595 (50.07%), while rural residents were 1,568,083 (49.93%).

At the end of 2023, Neijiang's registered population was 3.967 million, a decrease of 21,500 from the previous year, including 2.0421 million males, down 11,500. During the year, there were 19,800 births, with a birth rate of 4.98‰, and 23,600 deaths, with a death rate of 5.94‰.

== Transportation ==
Neijiang railway station is situated on the Chengdu–Chongqing railway and is the most central. The Neijiang–Kunming railway also starts here. Neijiang North railway station is situated on the Chengdu–Chongqing intercity railway and is served by high-speed trains.

== Tourism ==
The Longchang Archway Complex, located in Longchang, Sichuan, is a National 4A-level tourist attraction and a Major Historical and Cultural Site Protected at the National Level. It consists of 17 stone archways, originally built between the Southern Song and the Republic of China periods, with most constructed during the Qing Dynasty. The archways are made of stone in the traditional archway style, about 9 meters wide and 11 meters high, featuring carvings of historical figures and traditional patterns. The complex reflects the architectural characteristics of the Ming and Qing dynasties and holds multidisciplinary cultural value, earning it the reputation as the "Hometown of Chinese Archways."

Shengshui Temple, formerly known as Xingci Chan Monastery, was founded during the Xiantong period of the Tang Dynasty and covers about 20,000 square meters. Existing structures include the Hall of Heavenly Kings, Mahavira Hall, Sutra Library, Yuanjue Hall, Ancient Great Compassion Hall, and Dharma Hall. It is one of the eight major monastic complexes in Sichuan and was designated a Major Historical and Cultural Site Protected at the National Level in 2013.

Zizhong Confucian Temple and Martial Temple are Qing Dynasty architectural relics located about 100 meters apart. The Confucian Temple features a compound quadrangle layout, with main buildings including the Dacheng Hall, Chongsheng Shrine, Bell Tower, and Drum Tower, all with glazed tile roofs reflecting southern Chinese architectural style. The Martial Temple comprises the Guansheng Hall, Wuxing Hall, and Sanyi Shrine, and is well preserved. Both temples serve as important sites for the study of Confucianism and are valuable examples of "temple-school combined" architecture. They were listed as Major Historical and Cultural Sites Protected at the National Level in 2006.

== Notable people ==
- Chang Dai-chien, artist
- Tian Ye, mathematician
