= Longchang =

Longchang 隆昌市
- County-level city
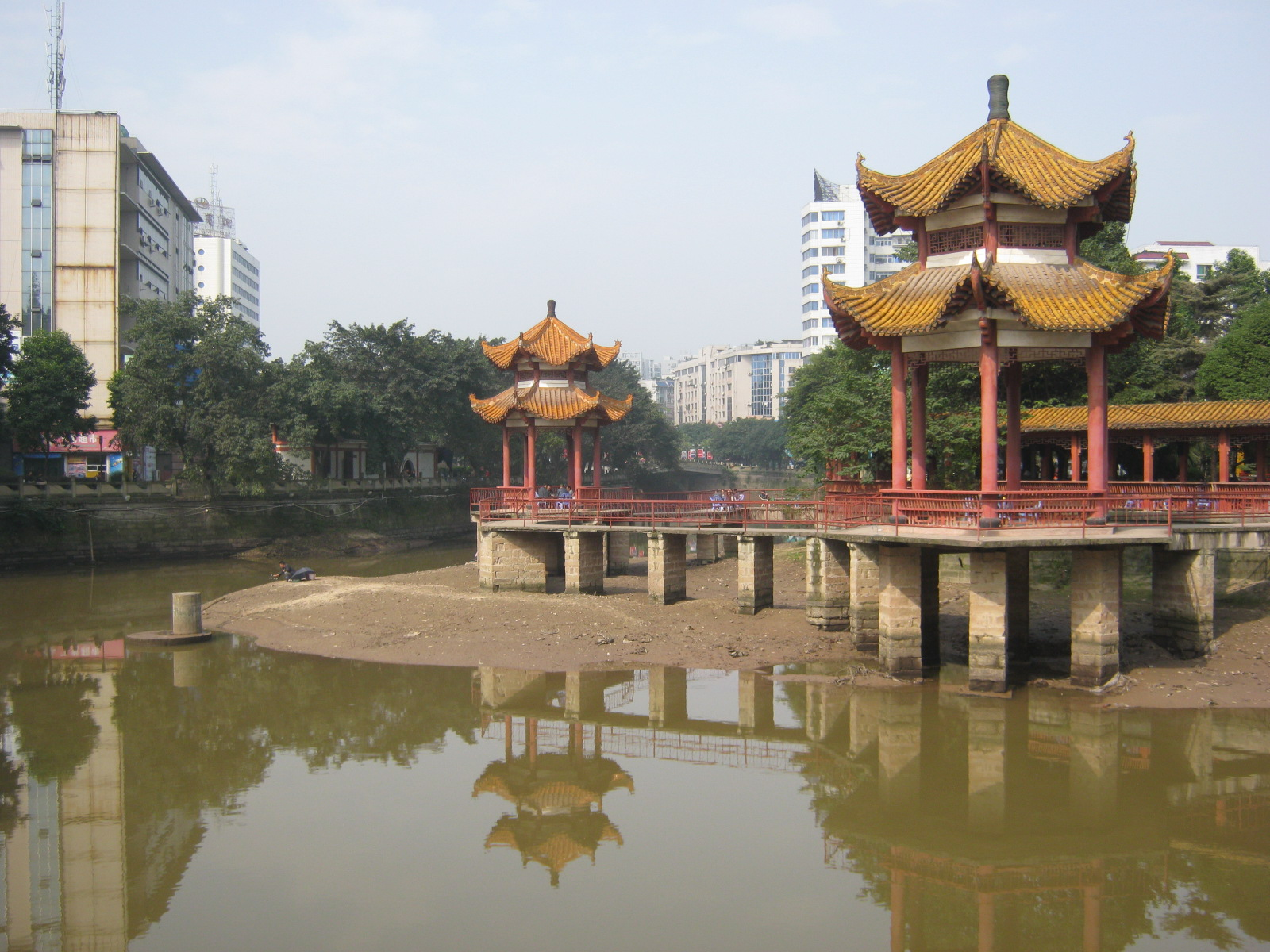
- home of memorial arch

- Location in Sichuan
- Coordinates: 29°20′22″N 105°17′15″E
- Country: China
- Province: Sichuan
- Prefecture-level city: Neijiang

Area
  - Total: 792 km^{2} (306 sq mi)

Population (2020 census)
  - Total: 568,900
  - Density: 718/km^{2} (1,860/sq mi)
- Time zone: UTC+8 (China Standard)
- Website: www.longchang.gov.cn

Longchang (Chinese: 隆昌; pinyin: Lóngchāng) is a county-level city of Sichuan. It is under the administration of Neijiang city. Longchang has a population of nearly 568,900, covering 792 square kilometers.

== Geography ==
Longchang is the boundary of Sichuan and Chongqing, and plays as the distribution center of Sichuan, Yunnan, Guizhou, and Chongqing.

== Administrative divisions ==
Longchang comprises 2 subdistricts and 11 towns:

subdistricts

- Guhu 古湖街道
- Jin'e 金鹅街道

towns

- Xiangshi 响石镇
- Shengdeng 圣灯镇
- Huangjia 黄家镇
- Shuangfeng 双凤镇
- Longshi 龙市镇
- Jieshi 界市镇
- Shinian 石碾镇
- Shiyanqiao 石燕桥镇
- Hujia 胡家镇
- Yunding 云顶镇
- Purun 普润镇

== Transport ==
Roads pass through Longchang, such as the Chengdu–Chongqing Railway, highway, public road, East Chuanyun (Sichuan to Yunnan) road, Longna (Longchang to Luzhou) highway, Longya (Longchang to Ya'an) road, Longhuang (Longchang to Huangtong Guizhou) railway. It is called the east gate of Sichuan.

== Culture ==
Longchang is famous for memorial arches and blue stone. Longchang is transforming into a bluestone cultural city with eight bluestone image views, including gate, culture, city's dining room, lounge, green park, landscape, business district, and landmark.

== Climate ==
Climate data for Longchang, elevation 386 m (1,266 ft), (1991–2020 normals, extremes 1981–present)
Month	Jan	Feb	Mar	Apr	May	Jun	Jul	Aug	Sep	Oct	Nov	Dec	Year
Record high °C (°F)	18.5 (65.3)	24.0 (75.2)	32.2 (90.0)	34.0 (93.2)	36.4 (97.5)	36.2 (97.2)	37.5 (99.5)	42.6 (108.7)	39.1 (102.4)	32.7 (90.9)	25.1 (77.2)	17.9 (64.2)	42.6 (108.7)
Mean daily maximum °C (°F)	9.9 (49.8)	13.1 (55.6)	18.0 (64.4)	23.4 (74.1)	26.6 (79.9)	28.4 (83.1)	31.6 (88.9)	31.8 (89.2)	26.9 (80.4)	21.1 (70.0)	16.7 (62.1)	11.1 (52.0)	21.6 (70.8)
Daily mean °C (°F)	7.2 (45.0)	9.7 (49.5)	13.8 (56.8)	18.7 (65.7)	22.1 (71.8)	24.3 (75.7)	27.0 (80.6)	26.9 (80.4)	22.9 (73.2)	18.0 (64.4)	13.6 (56.5)	8.6 (47.5)	17.7 (63.9)
Mean daily minimum °C (°F)	5.3 (41.5)	7.4 (45.3)	10.9 (51.6)	15.4 (59.7)	18.7 (65.7)	21.4 (70.5)	23.7 (74.7)	23.5 (74.3)	20.4 (68.7)	16.1 (61.0)	11.6 (52.9)	6.9 (44.4)	15.1 (59.2)
Record low °C (°F)	−2.2 (28.0)	−0.4 (31.3)	0.7 (33.3)	6.4 (43.5)	9.6 (49.3)	15.1 (59.2)	17.5 (63.5)	17.5 (63.5)	13.9 (57.0)	5.4 (41.7)	2.3 (36.1)	−1.6 (29.1)	−2.2 (28.0)
Average precipitation mm (inches)	16.2 (0.64)	16.8 (0.66)	36.1 (1.42)	68.1 (2.68)	105.7 (4.16)	184.1 (7.25)	204.3 (8.04)	163.3 (6.43)	129.5 (5.10)	74.0 (2.91)	30.1 (1.19)	16.8 (0.66)	1,045 (41.14)
Average precipitation days (≥ 0.1 mm)	10.2	9.1	11.2	13.4	14.4	16.9	13.4	12.1	14.3	17.3	11.1	10.0	153.4
Average snowy days	0.5	0.2	0	0	0	0	0	0	0	0	0	0.2	0.9
Average relative humidity (%)	86	82	78	77	77	84	82	80	84	87	86	87	83
Mean monthly sunshine hours	34.4	50.7	94.2	128.9	127.4	109.4	168.8	175.8	102.8	56.0	53.4	31.8	1,133.6
Percentage possible sunshine	10	16	25	33	30	26	40	43	28	16	17	10	25
Source: China Meteorological Administration all-time extreme temperature all-time January high
