= Chengdu East railway station =

Railway and metro station in Chengdu, China

Chengdudong 成都东
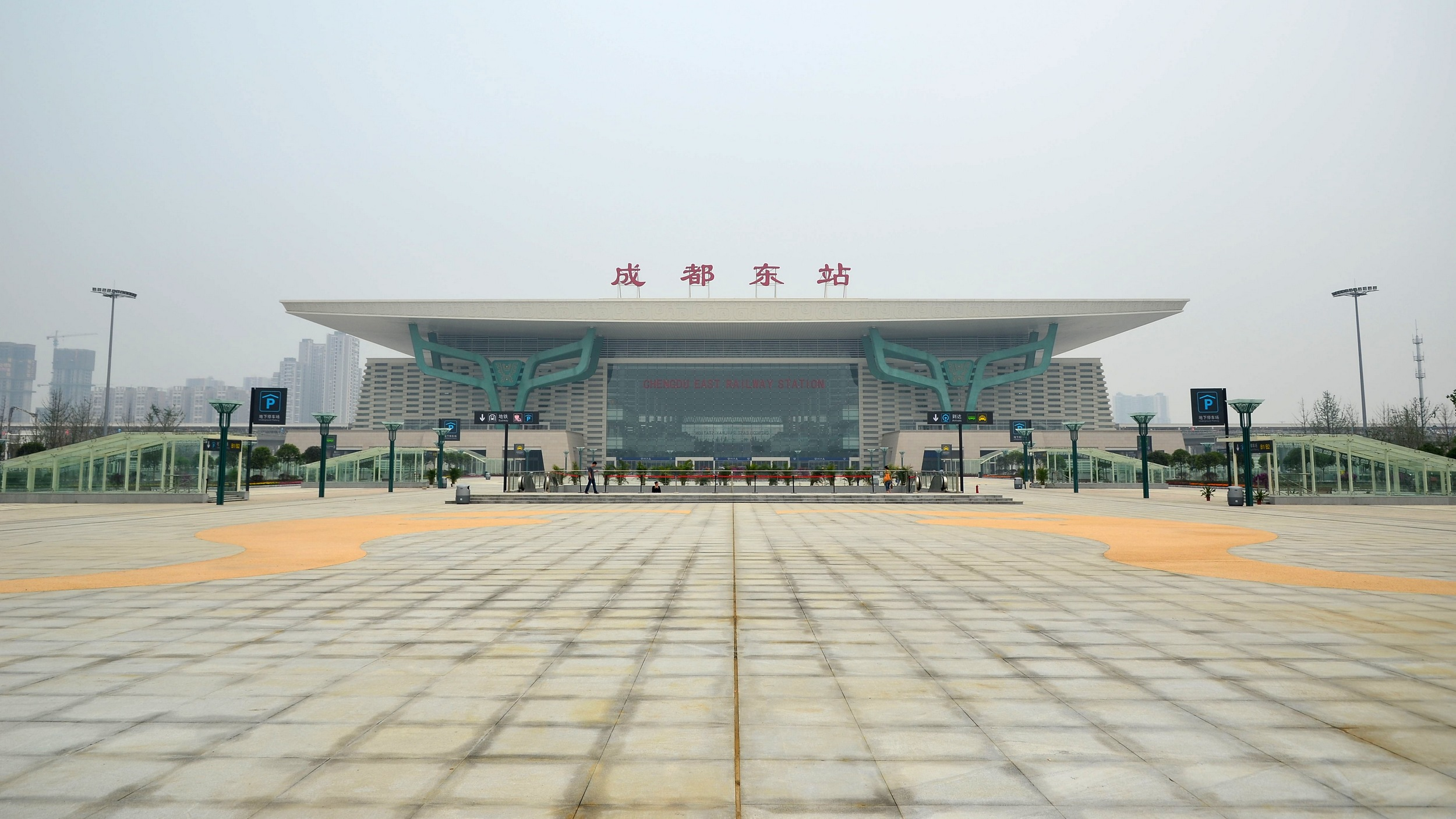

General information
- Other names: Chengdu East
- Location: Chenghua District, Chengdu, Sichuan; China
- Coordinates: 30.6311°N 104.1390°E
- Operator: China Railway; Chengdu Railway Bureau
- Lines: Chengdu–Chongqing Intercity Railway; Chengdu–Chongqing Railway; Chengdu–Guiyang high-speed railway; Chengdu–Kunming Railway; Dazhou–Chengdu Railway; Chengdu–Yibin high-speed railway; Second Chengdu–Chongqing high-speed railway (under construction)
- Platforms: 26 (12 island platforms, 2 side platforms)
- Connections: East Chengdu Railway Station

Other information
- Station code: TMIS code: 46543; Telegraph code: ICW; Pinyin code: CDD
- Classification: Top Class station
Location

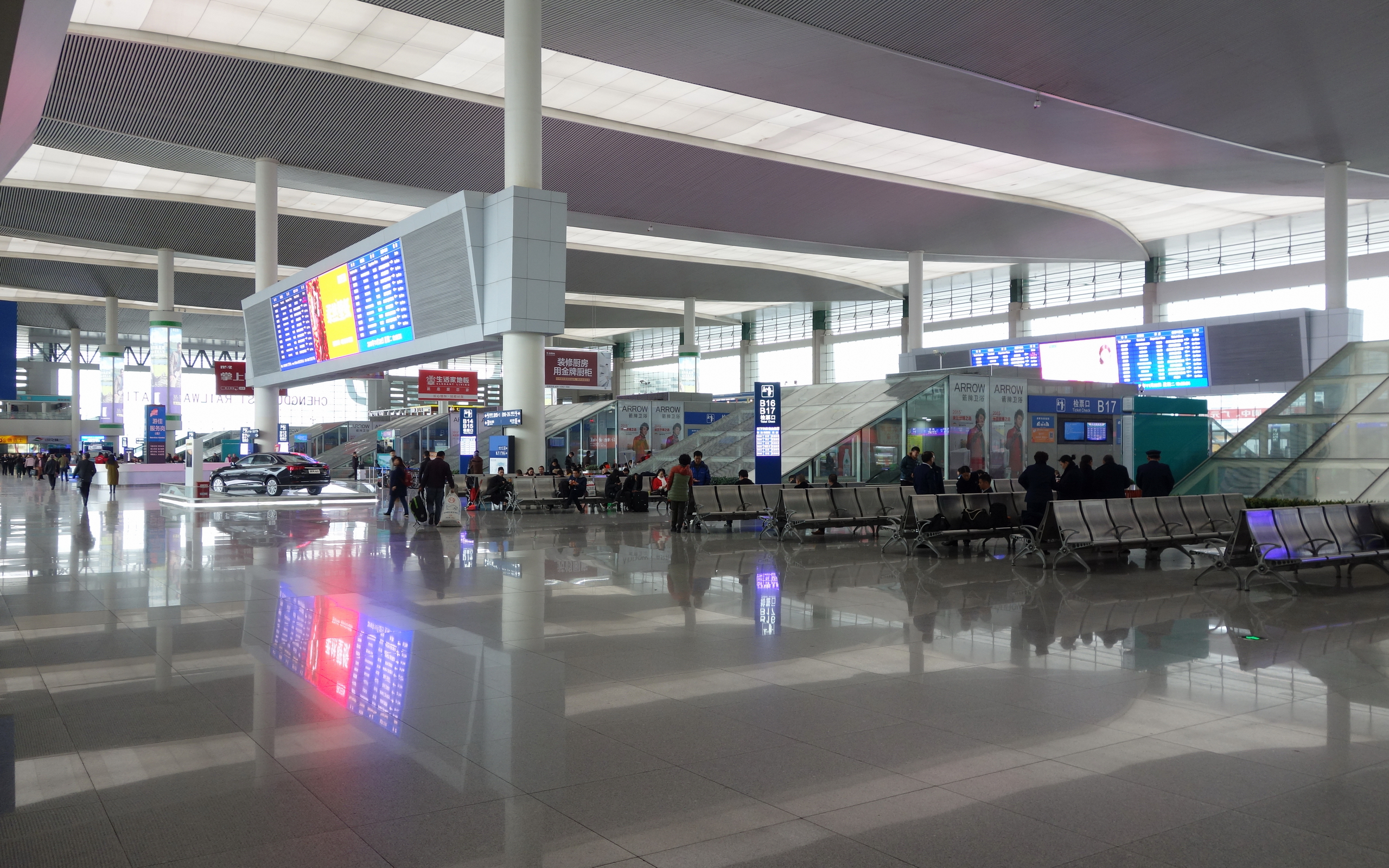
Interior of Chengdu East train station Hall.

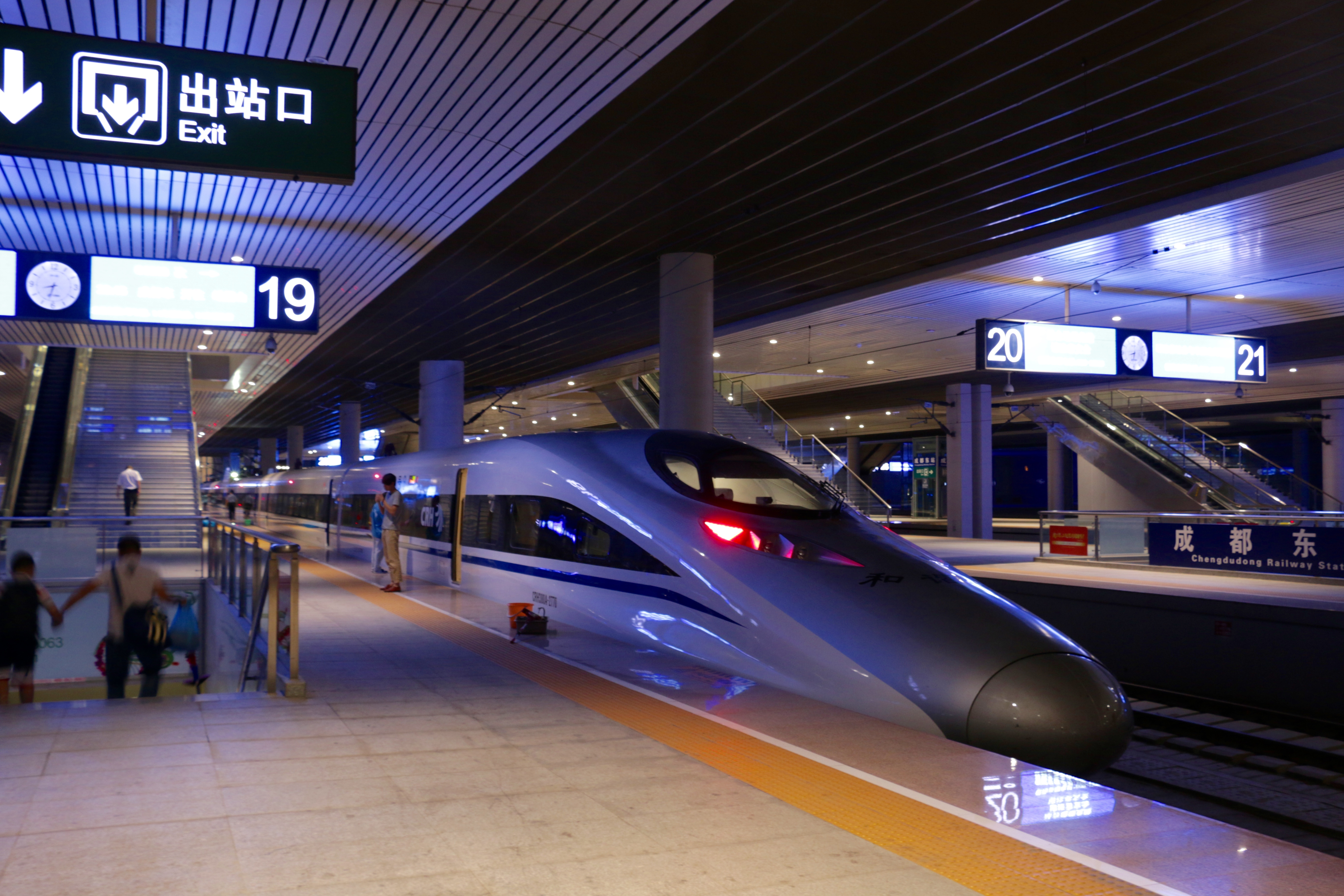
CRH380A in Chengdu East train station.

Chengdudong (Chengdu East) railway station (simplified Chinese: 成都东站; traditional Chinese: 成都東站; pinyin: Chéngdūdōng Zhàn) is a railway station in Chenghua District, Chengdu, the capital of Sichuan province, serving the Chengdu–Chongqing intercity railway, the Chengdu–Guiyang high-speed railway, the Dazhou–Chengdu railway and Xi'an–Chengdu high-speed railway. It is connected to Chengdu Metro Line 2 and Line 7.

== History ==
Construction began on December 29, 2008.

== Station structure ==
=== Layout ===
Chengdu East Railway Station is divided into two spaces, the station building and outdoor squares, with a total area of about 68 hectares, the station building itself has an area of 108,000 square meters. The main building of the station is divided into five main levels, including an elevated Waiting Hall level (with mezzanine eating areas and shopping), Platform Level (Ground Level), Arrivals Level and two levels of Chengdu Metro lines. Total investment for its construction was set at about 3.83 billion yuan in 2011 when it was put into use. The station exterior design features a fusion of Jinsha and Sanxingdui bronze shape artistic elements of the ancient Shu culture. Beneath the outdoor squares, substantial car parking and a bus terminal is housed. Passengers enter the station across the outdoor Square or direct access to the station building from two north–south elevated roads. Ticket offices exist in the top Waiting Hall area and beneath in the Arrivals Hall.

=== Track layout ===
The station has 14 platforms and 26 tracks, all of which are covered. The departures Waiting Hall sits above the platforms, with arrivals descending down to the Arrivals Hall level below the platforms.

== Connections ==
Chengdu East Railway Station is a terminus of the Chengdu–Chongqing Railway, Chengdu–Kunming Railway and Dazhou–Chengdu Railway.

Railway Administration	Destination
Chengdu Railway Bureau	Dazhou, Chongqing North, Guiyang
Shanghai Railway Bureau	Shanghai Hongqiao, Hangzhou, Wenzhou
Guangzhou Railway Group	Guangzhou, Changsha, Haikou
Wuhan Railway Bureau	Wuhan
Zhengzhou Railway Bureau	Zhengzhou
Nanning Railway Bureau	Nanning, Guilin North

== Chengdu Metro ==
Chengdu East Railway Station 成都东客站
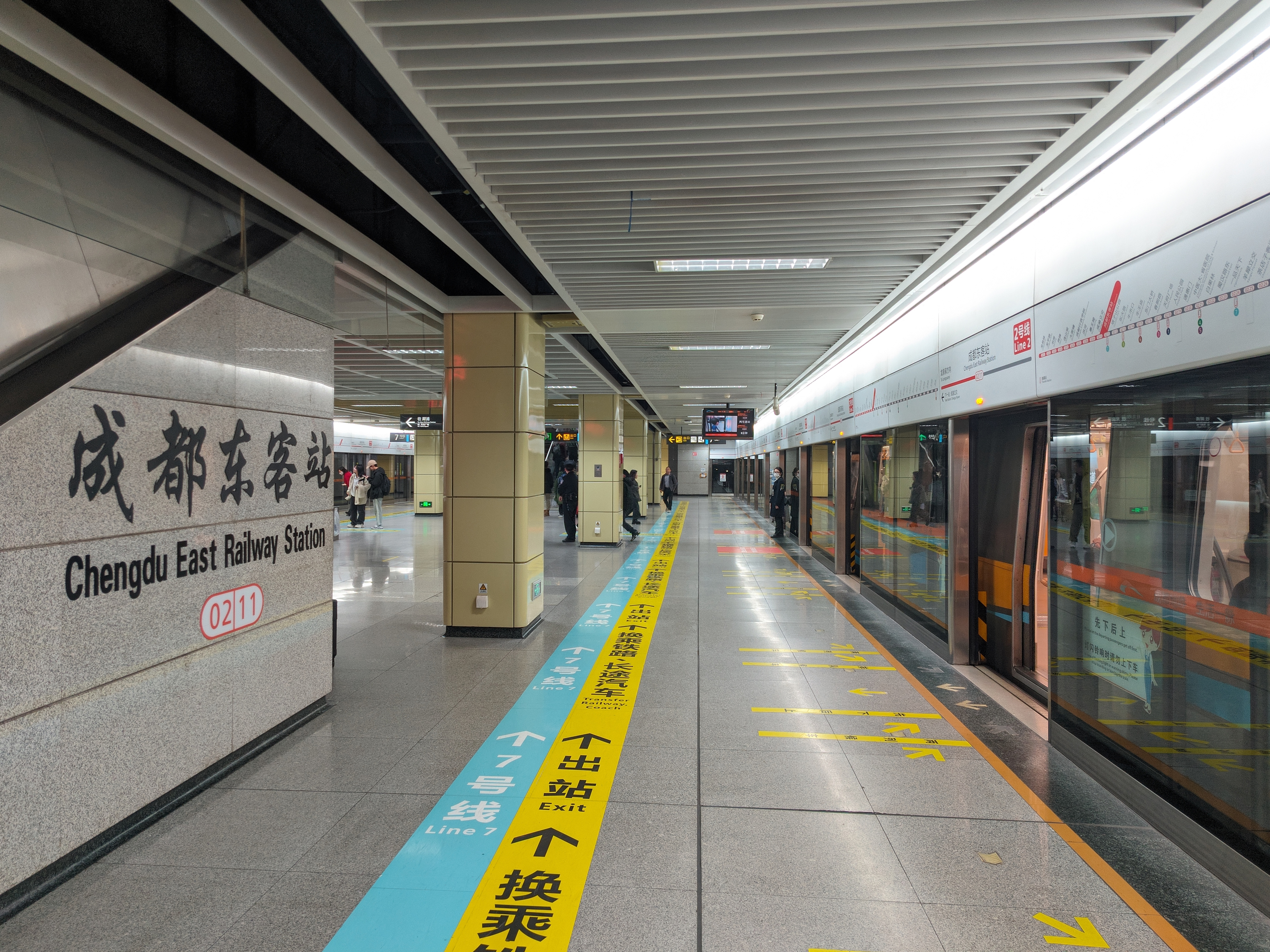
- Line 2 platform

General information
- Location: Chenghua District, Chengdu, Sichuan; China
- Operator: Chengdu Metro Limited
- Lines: Line 2 Line 7
- Platforms: 4 (2 island platforms)

Other information
- Station code: 0211 0722

History
- Opened: 16 September 2012
- Former names: East Chengdu Railway Station

Services
Preceding station	Chengdu Metro	Following station
Chengyu Flyover towards Longquanyi	Line 2	Tazishan Park towards Xipu Railway Station
Daguan Clockwise	Line 7	Yinghui Road Anticlockwise
Location

Chengdu East Railway Station (Chinese: 成都东客站), formerly known as East Chengdu Railway Station, is a transfer station on Line 2 and Line 7 of the Chengdu Metro. It serves the Chengdu East railway station.

=== Gallery ===
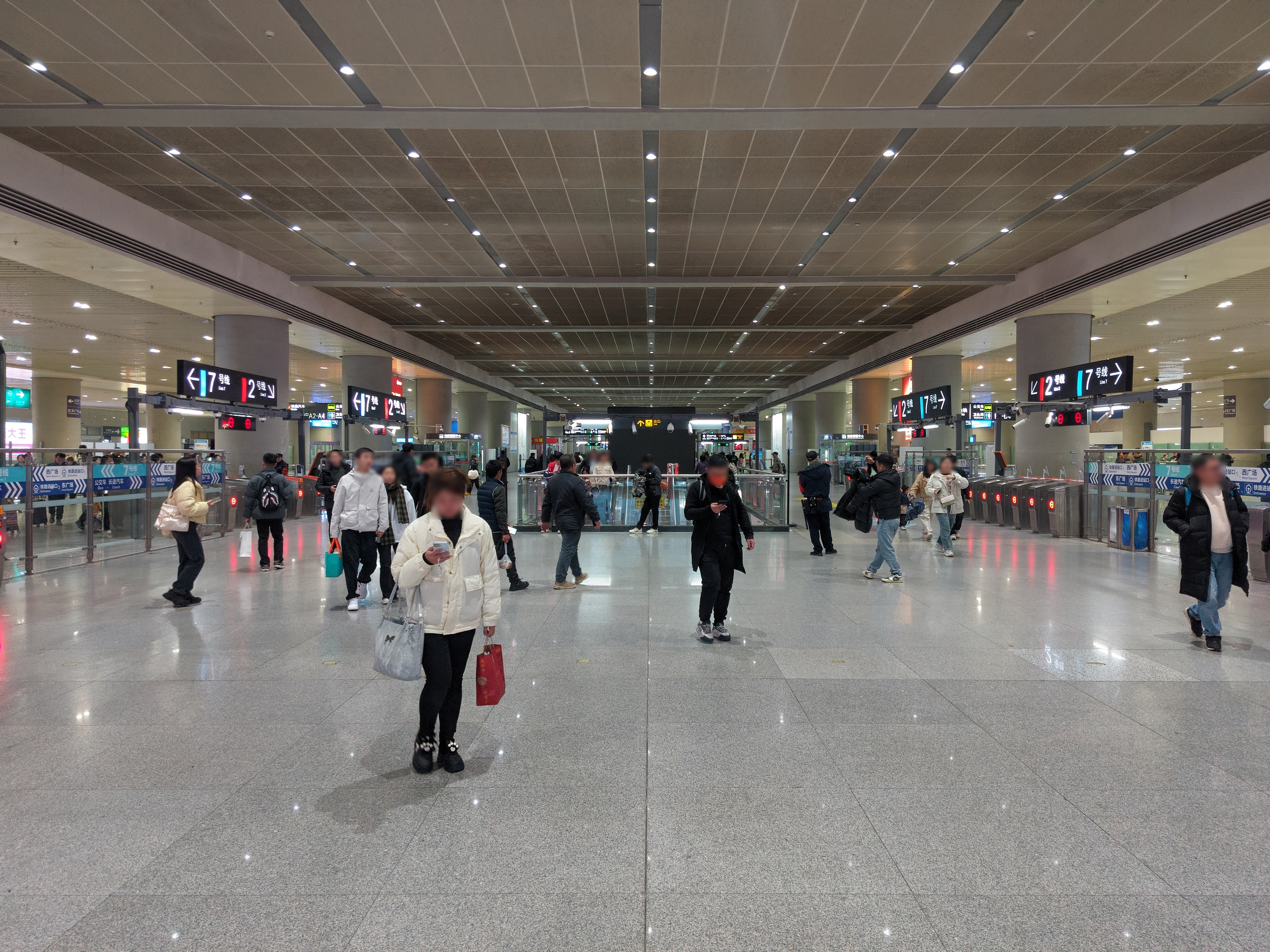
Concourse

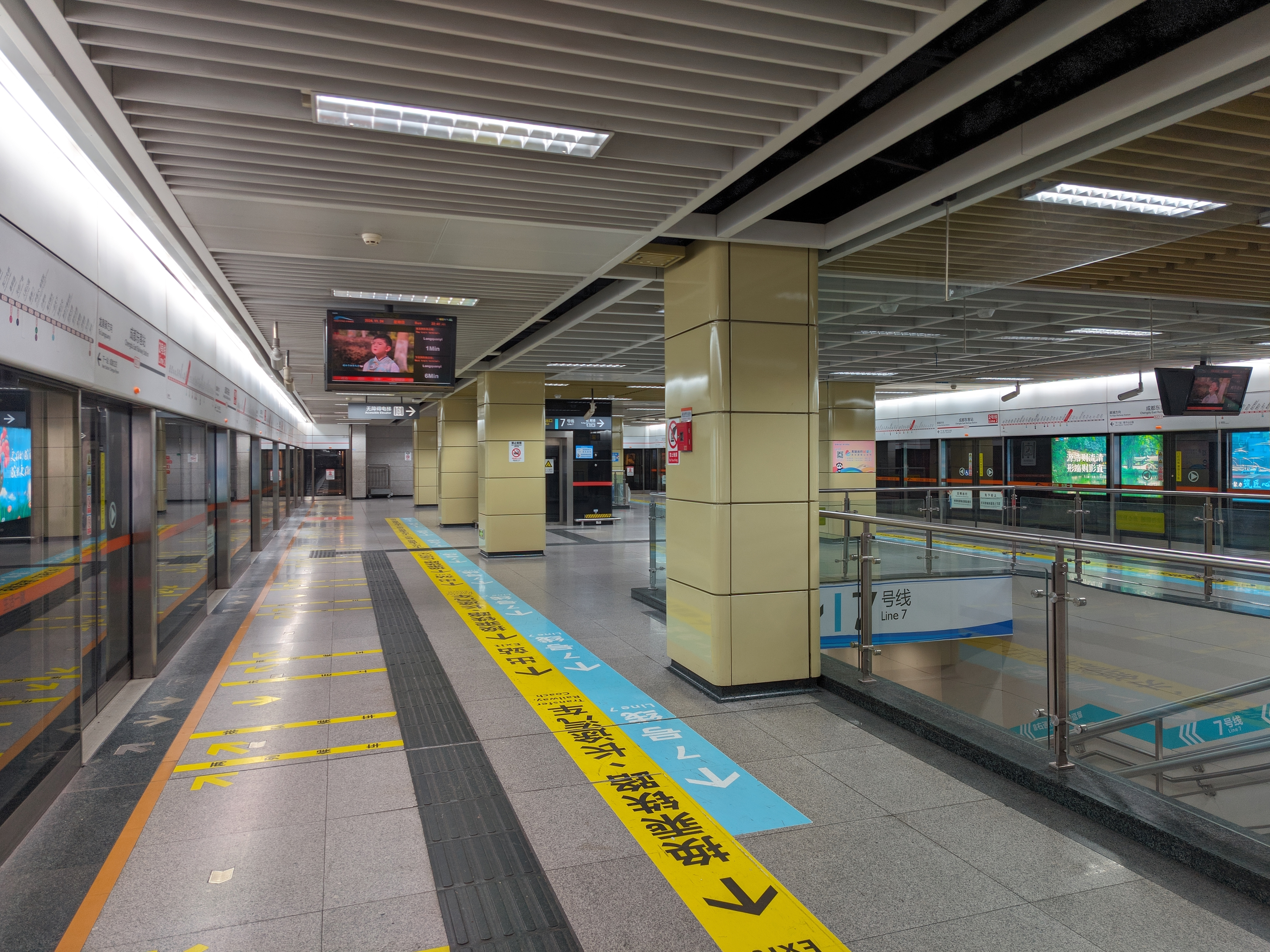
Line 2 platform

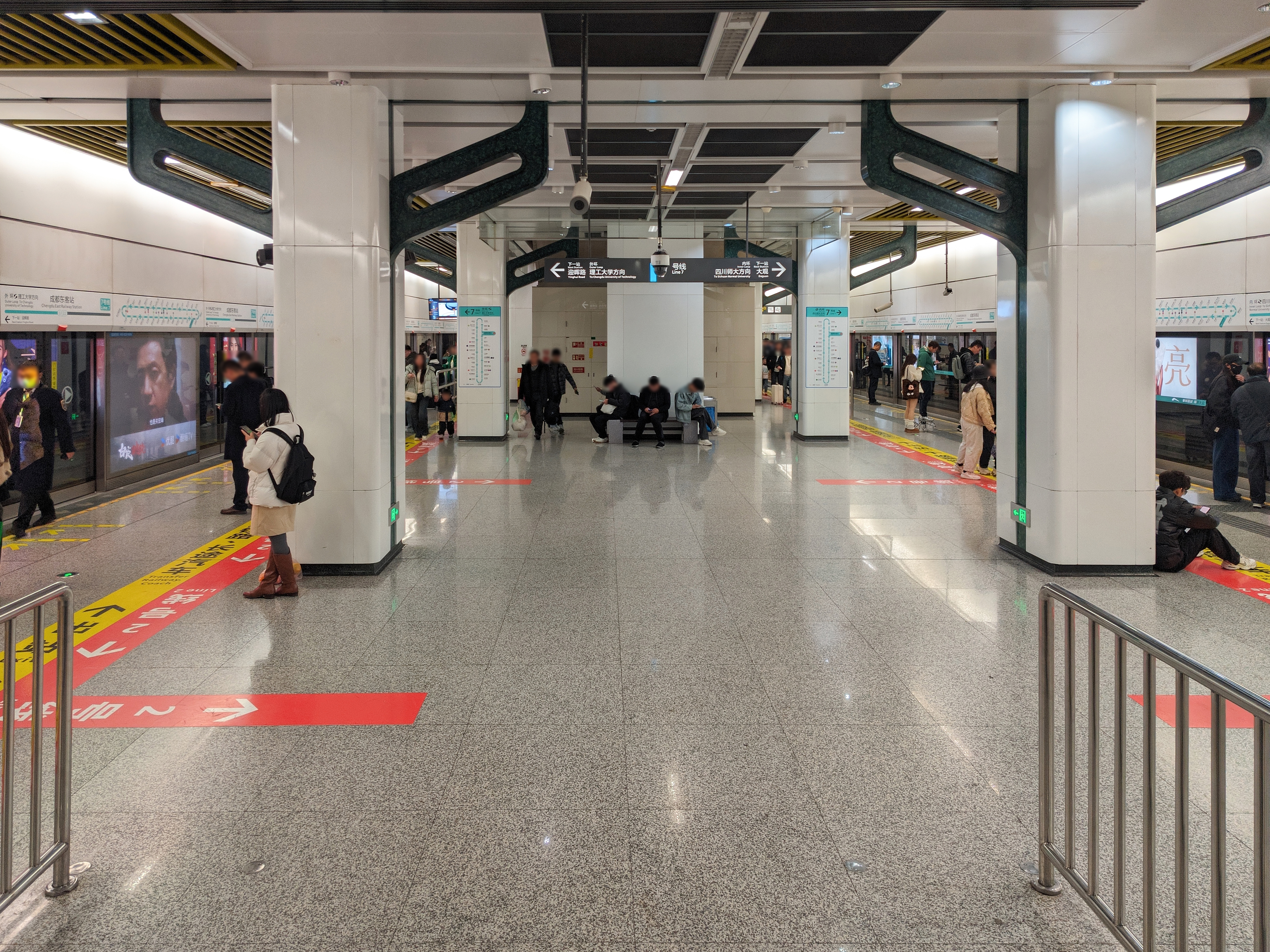
Line 7 platform

== See also ==
- Chengdu railway station
- Chengdu Metro
