= Shapingba railway station =

Railway station in Chongqing, China

Shapingba 沙坪坝
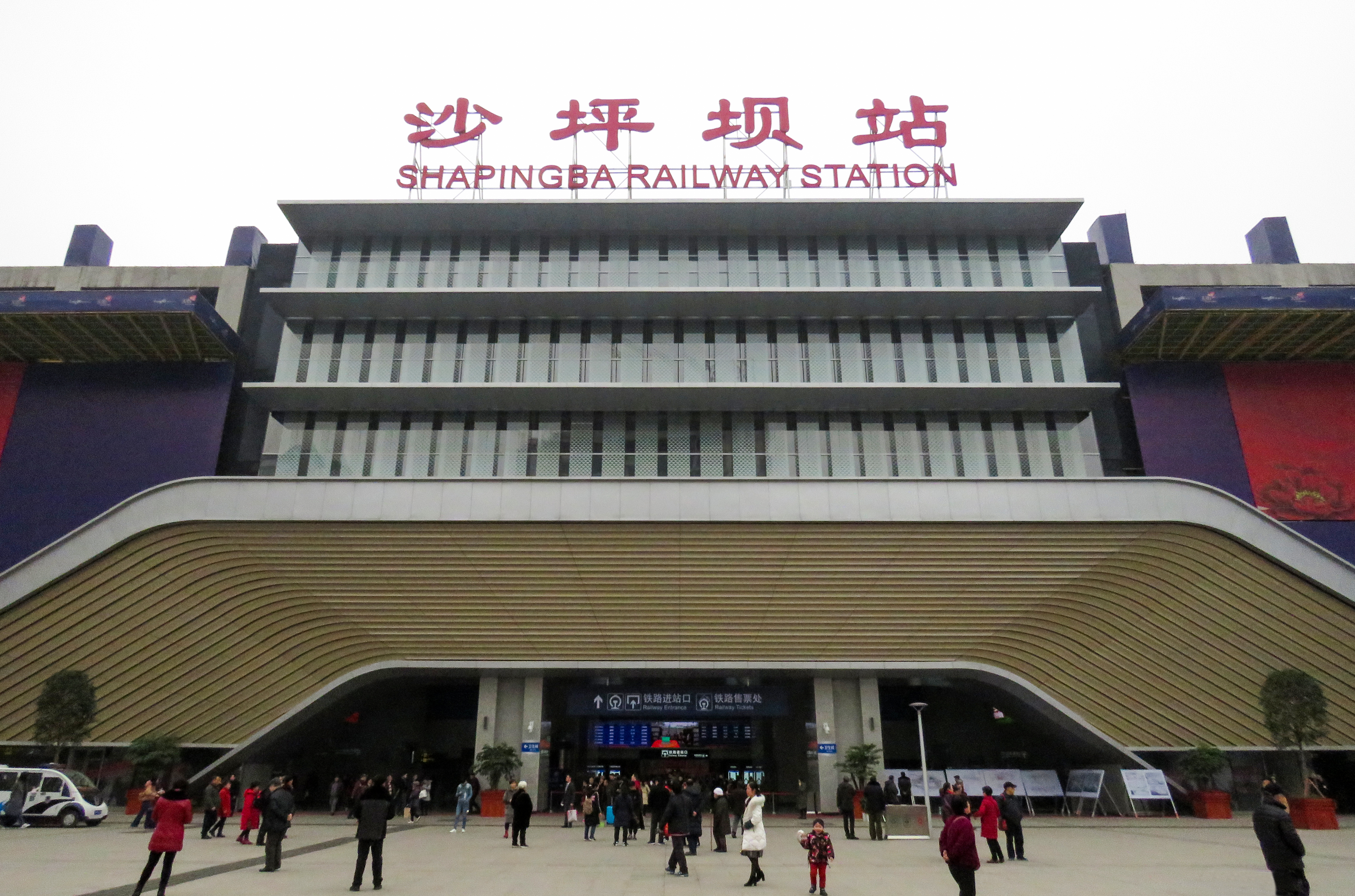
- Shapingba railway station

General information
- Location: Shapingba Station West Road, Shapingba District, Chongqing; China
- Coordinates: 29°33′23″N 106°27′12″E
- Operated by: Chengdu Railway Bureau; China Railway Corporation
- Lines: Chuanqian Railway; Chengyu Railway; Xiangyu Railway
- Platforms: 4
- Connections: Shapingba Metro Station; Bus terminal

Other information
- Station code: 47066 (TMIS); CYW (telegram); SPB (pinyin)

History
- Opened: 1979; 47 years ago 25 January 2018; 8 years ago (renovation)
Location

The Shapingba railway station (Chinese: 沙坪坝站; pinyin: Shāpíngbà zhàn) is a railway station of Chengyu Passenger Railway that is located in Shapingba District of Chongqing, People's Republic of China. It was originally opened in 1979 serving ground-level tracks and has been operated as part of China Railway's Chengdu Bureau. In 1988, it was renamed as Chongqing North Railway Station, but reverted to the Shapingba name when another new station in Yubei District was opened as Chongqing North railway station. Serving only conventional services, the station was closed in 2011 for a major renovation and as part of an expansion of the Three Gorges Plaza commercial development. It was redeveloped as a fully Integrated Transport Hub, serving high-speed and conventional rail, metro rail services, local city buses, taxi services and personal cars, all within a major commercial and retail complex. The railway station section of this project was reopened on 25 January 2018 and the final retail and commercial development was completed on 30 December 2020. It should not be confused with the larger Chongqing West railway station, which is also located in Shapingba District, and opened on the same day.

== History ==
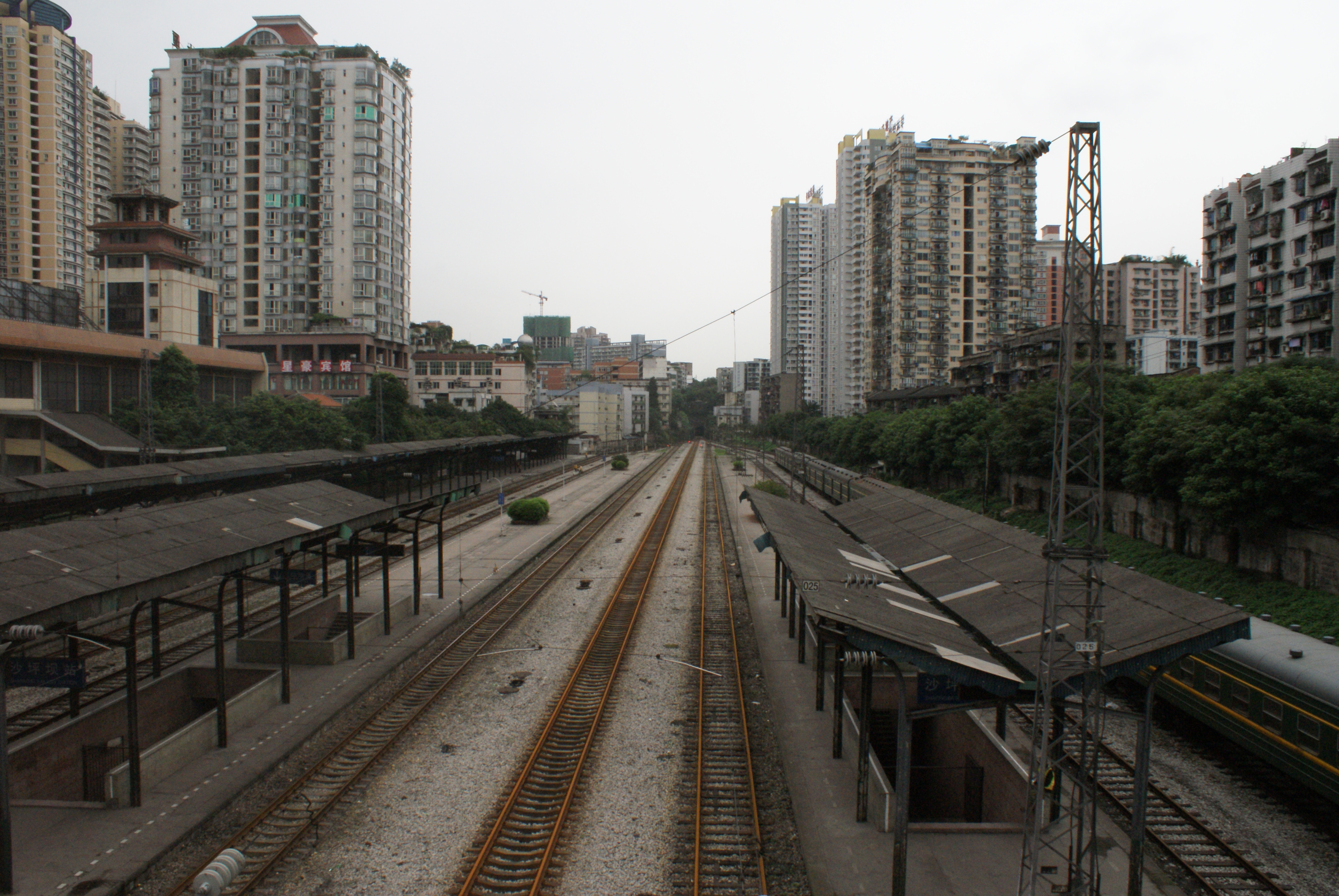
The old Shapingba Station before renovation (2008)

- 1979: Shapingba station opened.
- 1988: Shapingba station renamed "Chongqing North Station".
- 20 October 2006: The station was renamed again as "Shapingba station" with the opening of the Chongqing North Station in Yubei District
- 8 May 2011: The final service of the 5608 train from Chongqing bound for Nanchong before demolition of the station, platform and tracks.
- 28 December 2012: Construction of a new Shapingba Station, as an Integrated Transport hub project, officially started.
- May 2017: New station building begins track laying.
- October 2017: New main underground station building completed, track laying completed. Station interiors begin to be decorated.
- 25 January 2018: New station put into operation with high speed rail services to Chengdu East Railway Station.

== Station structure ==
Originally built as an above-ground station, serving at-grade railway tracks. After major renovations and construction work, the current station building is mostly an underground complex serving a rebuilt sunken railway, with a retail and commercial development being built above the station complex. The redevelopment was budgeted to cost 10 Billion RMB. The renovations for the station building was opened to the public on 25 January 2018.

=== Station building ===
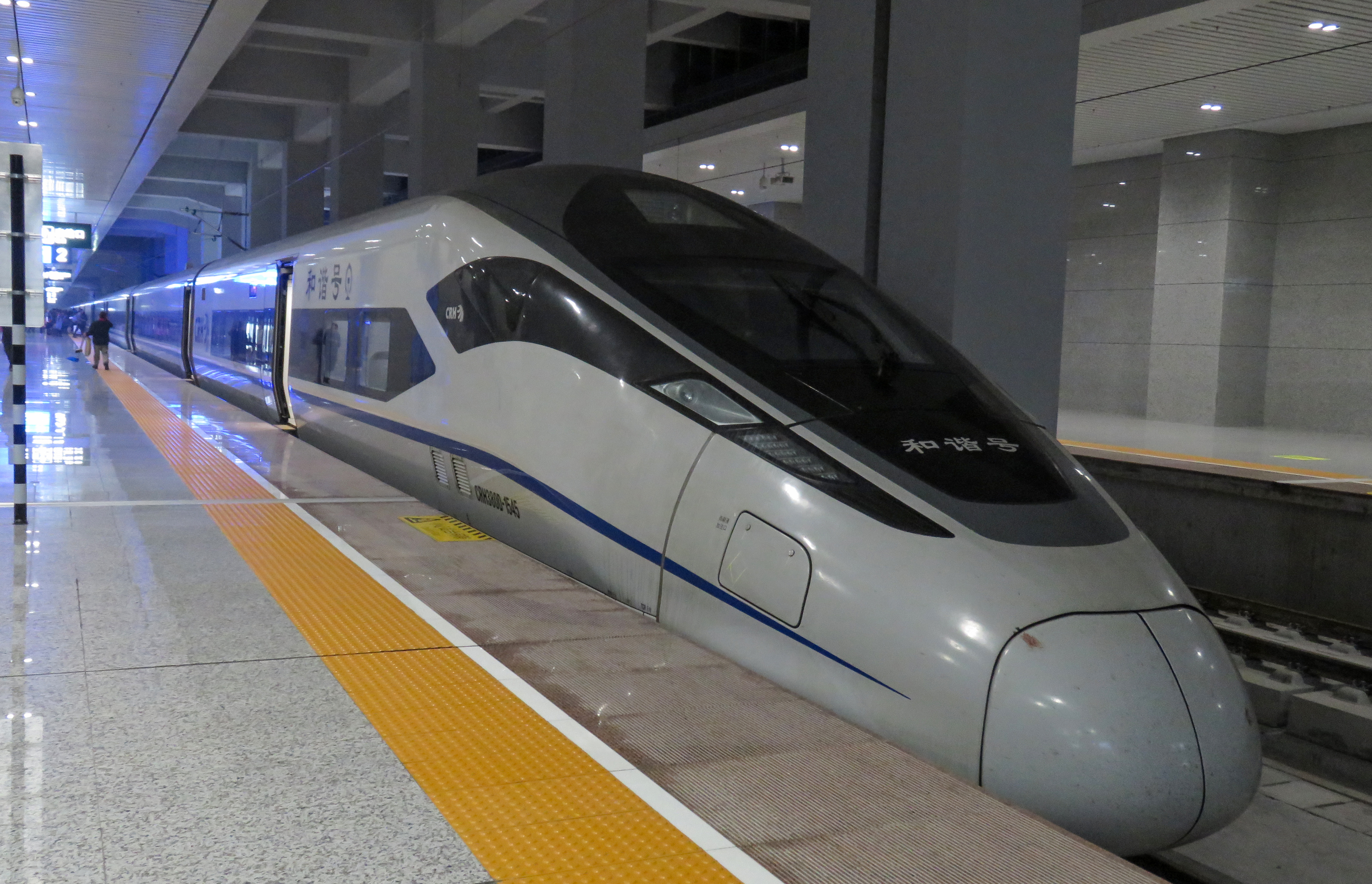
A CRH380D EMU at the station.

The main railway station consists of eight levels, one at ground level and seven underground levels. There are also 34 self-service gates in the waiting room. In the waiting area and at platform level, it is equipped with 8 barrier-free elevators and 13 escalators to facilitate passenger movements. Public toilets (including barrier-free toilets) been built at the Front Entrance, the Waiting Hall, Transfer Hall, Taxi Station and on the Bus Station levels. Parenting rooms are present in the Waiting Room and Transfer Hall. A temporary shopping area is present in the Waiting Room too. Parking for 800 vehicles is provided over four levels.

The bus station serves only local city bus services on 27 routes and an Airport Express bus to Chongqing Jiangbei Airport's Terminal 3. There are another two additional city bus stations externally to the station along the West and South Roads serving the station. Long distance buses are found at Chongqing West, Chongqing North and Chongqing railway stations.

=== Commercial and retail development ===
Above the station, two office towers and a retail development is under construction. Called the Shapingba Twin Towers, it is a first in China for such a mixed commercial development, as part of a railway station. The northern side of the station will also feature an open public space as part of an expansion to the existing Three Gorges Plaza. Construction of this development is expected to be complete by 2020.

== Metro station ==
Connection and interchange is possible with the Chongqing Rail Transit metro system. It connects with the Shapingba station on Line 1, Line 9 and the Loop Line via dedicated underground passageways.

== Train services ==
The station opened on 25 January 2018 with 10 pairs of trains daily between Chengdu East Railway Station and Shapingba.
