= Neijiang–Kunming railway =

Railway line in China

Neijiang–Kunming railway 内昆铁路

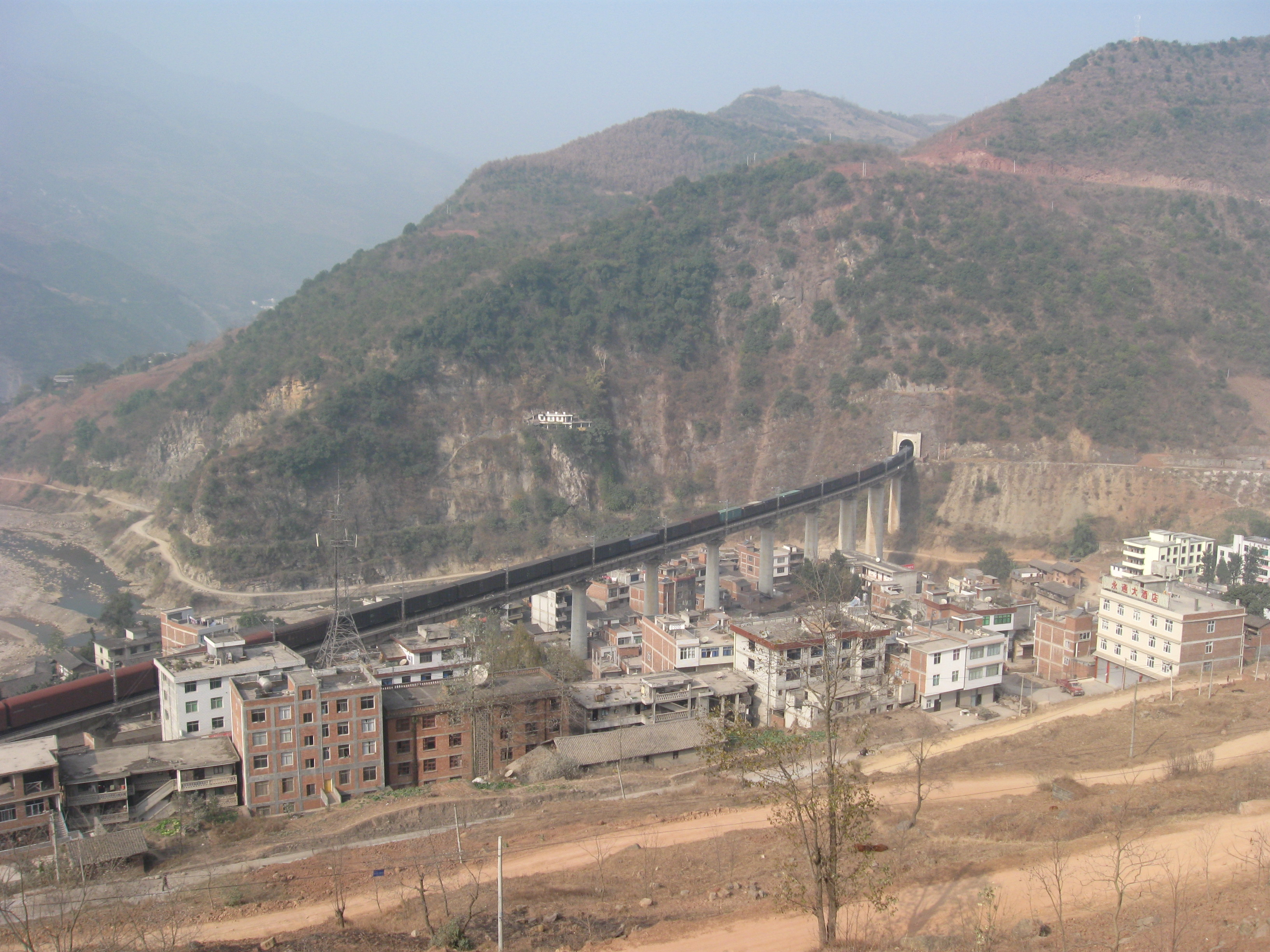
- Neijiang–Kunming railway in Daguan County

Overview
- Status: Active
- Termini: Neijiang; Kunming

Service
- Type: Heavy rail
- Operator(s): China Railway

Technical
- Line length: 872 km (542 mi)
- Number of tracks: 1 (Neijiang–Meihuashan); 2 (Meihuashan–Kunming)
- Track gauge: 1,435 mm (4 ft 8 1/2 in) standard gauge
- Electrification: 25 kV/50 Hz AC overhead catenary

The Neijiang–Kunming railway or Neikun railway (simplified Chinese: 内昆铁路; traditional Chinese: 内昆鐵路; pinyin: nikūn tiělù), is a single-track railroad between Neijiang and Kunming in Southwest China. The line runs 872 km (542 mi) from Neijiang in Sichuan province to Kunming in Yunnan province through western Guizhou province. The Neikun Line was built in three sections. The northern section, from Neijiang to Anbian township of Yibin and 140 km (87 mi) in length, was built from 1956 to 1960. The southern section from Kunming to Meihuashan station, near Liupanshui in Guizhou, and 370 km (230 mi) in length, was built from 1960 to 1965 and became the westernmost segment of the Guiyang-Kunming railway. The middle section between Anbian and Meihuashan through Zhaotong and 358 km (222 mi) in length was built from 1998 to 2001. Major cities and towns along route include Neijiang, Zigong, Yibin, Shuifu, Zhaotong, Weining County, Xuanwei, Qujing and Kunming.

== Rail connections ==
- Neijiang: Chengdu–Chongqing railway
- Meihuashan station: Shanghai–Kunming railway (Guizhou–Kunming railway)

== High-speed passenger railways ==
The line between the Liupanshui area and Kunming has been paralleled by the Shanghai–Kunming high-speed railway since 2016. The proposed Chongqing–Kunming high-speed railway will parallel the line between Chongqing and Zhaotong and the proposed Liupanshui–Zhaotong intercity railway will parallel the line between Liupanshui and Zhaotong.

== See also ==
- List of railways in China
