= Dongxing, Neijiang =

Dongxing 东兴区
- District
- Location in Sichuan
- Coordinates: 29.593°N 105.075°E
- Country: China
- Province: Sichuan
- Prefecture-level city: Neijiang

Area
  - Total: 1,181 km^{2} (456 sq mi)

Population (2020)
  - Total: 754,120
  - Density: 638.5/km^{2} (1,654/sq mi)
- Time zone: UTC+8 (China Standard)
- Division code: DXQ

Dongxing District (simplified Chinese: 东兴区; traditional Chinese: 東興區; pinyin: Dōngxīng Qū) is a district of Neijiang City, Sichuan Province, China.

== Administrative divisions ==
Dongxing District comprises 5 subdistricts an 14 towns:

subdistricts

- Dongxing 东兴街道
- Xilin 西林街道
- Xinjiang 新江街道
- Shengli 胜利街道
- Gaoqiao 高桥街道

towns

- Tianjia 田家镇
- Guohua 郭北镇
- Gaoliang 高梁镇
- Baihe 白合镇
- Shunhe 顺河镇
- Shuangcai 双才镇
- Yangjia 杨家镇
- Pimu 椑木镇
- Shizi 石子镇
- Yongxing 永兴镇
- Pingtan 平坦镇
- Shuangqiao 双桥镇
- Fuxi 富溪镇
- Yongfu 永福镇
