= Shizhong, Neijiang =

Shizhong 市中区
- District
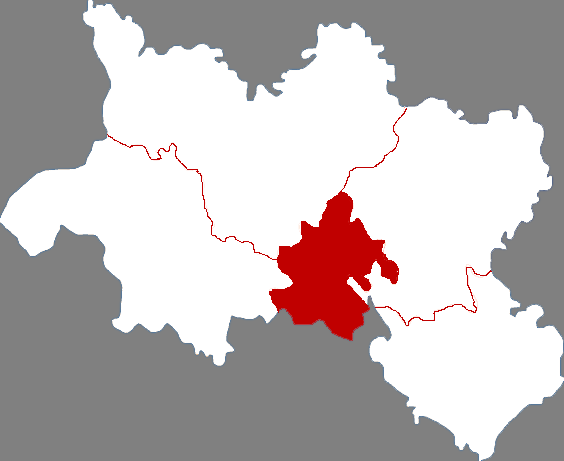

- Location in Sichuan
- Coordinates: 29°35′13″N 105°04′04″E
- Country: China
- Province: Sichuan
- Prefecture-level city: Neijiang
- District seat: Yuxi Subdistrict

Area
  - Total: 387.5 km^{2} (149.6 sq mi)

Population (2020 census)
  - Total: 337,106
  - Density: 870.0/km^{2} (2,253/sq mi)
- Time zone: UTC+8 (China Standard)
- Website: www.neijiangshizhongqu.gov.cn

Shizhong (Chinese: 市中; pinyin: Shìzhōng; lit. 'city center') is a district of the city of Neijiang, Sichuan Province, China.

== Administrative divisions ==
Shizhong District administers 6 subdistricts and 9 towns:

- Chengdong Subdistrict (城东街道)
- Chengxi Subdistrict (城西街道)
- Yuxi Subdistrict (玉溪街道)
- Pailou Subdistrict (牌楼街道)
- Haozikou Subdistrict (壕子口街道)
- Lexian Subdistrict (乐贤街道)
- Baima Town (白马镇)
- Shijia Town (史家镇)
- Lingjia Town (凌家镇)
- Chaoyang Town (朝阳镇)
- Yong'an Town (永安镇)
- Quan'an Town (全安镇)
- Jingmin Town (靖民镇)
- Longmen Town (龙门镇)
- Jiaotong Town (交通镇)
