= Chengdu–Chongqing intercity railway =

Railway line in China

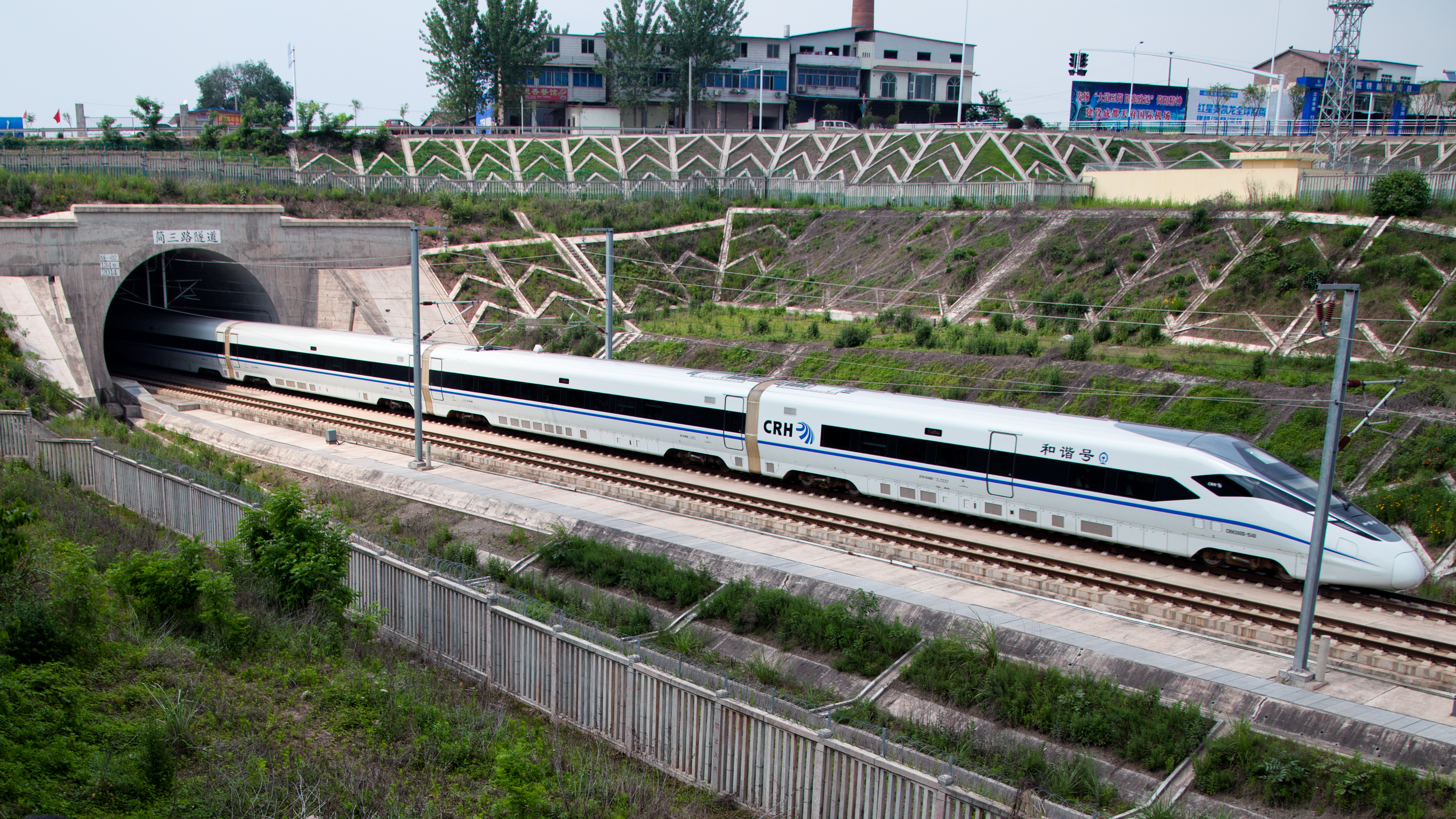
- A CRH380D train on Chengdu–Chongqing intercity railway, taken in Jianyang, Sichuan

Overview
- Native name: 成渝客运专线
- Status: Operational
- Owner: China Railway
- Locale: Sichuan and Chongqing
- Termini: Chengdu East; Chongqing
- Stations: 12

Service
- Type: High-speed rail
- System: China Railway High-speed
- Train number(s): G8xxx
- Operator(s): China Railway Chengdu Group

History
- Opened: 26 December 2015

Technical
- Line length: 307 km (191 mi) (main line)
- Track gauge: 1,435 mm (4 ft 8 1/2 in) standard gauge
- Operating speed: 350 km/h (217 mph)

Chinese name
- Simplified Chinese: 成渝客运专线
- Traditional Chinese: 成渝客運專線
Transcriptions
Standard Mandarin
- Hanyu Pinyin: Chéngyú Kèyùn Zhuānxiàn

The Chengdu–Chongqing intercity railway (simplified Chinese: 成渝客运专线; traditional Chinese: 成渝客運專線) is a 307-kilometre (191 mi) long high-speed railway that connects the cities of Chengdu (Sichuan) and Chongqing in southwestern China, with a maximum speed of 350 km/h (220 mph). The route passes through most of the same cities that the older Chengdu–Chongqing Railway does, but is significantly shorter due to the greater use of elevated sections and tunnels. The line includes four major elevated sections and two tunnels.

== History ==
Construction on the Chongqing section began on 22 March 2010 while work on the Sichuan section began on 11 November. The final tunnel achieved breakthrough on 16 December 2013 and a single track line was expected to open in first half of 2014. The complete double track configuration was due to be completed by the end of 2014. The line started operation on 26 December 2015, initially to Chongqing North until renovations were completed at Shapingba on 25 January 2018.

== Journey time ==
The railway reduced travel time between Chengdu and Chongqing to 75 minutes, 45 minutes quicker than the previous fastest route via Suining. Travel time was reduced further to only one hour on 24 December 2020, with the introduction of Fuxing trains and 350 km/h (220 mph) operations on the line.

An additional line is planned which will offer a faster journey time when complete, the Chengdu–Chongqing Central line high-speed railway.

== Railway stations ==
Route of the Chengdu–Chongqing intercity railway

There are 12 stations along the line:

Sichuan section

- Chengdu East railway station
- Jianyang South railway station
- Ziyang North railway station
- Zizhong North railway station
- Neijiang North railway station
- Longchang North railway station

Chongqing section

- Rongchang North railway station
- Dazu South railway station
- Yongchuan East railway station
- Bishan railway station
- Shapingba railway station
- Chongqing railway station
