= Chongqing railway station =

Railway station in Chongqing, China

Chongqing 重庆
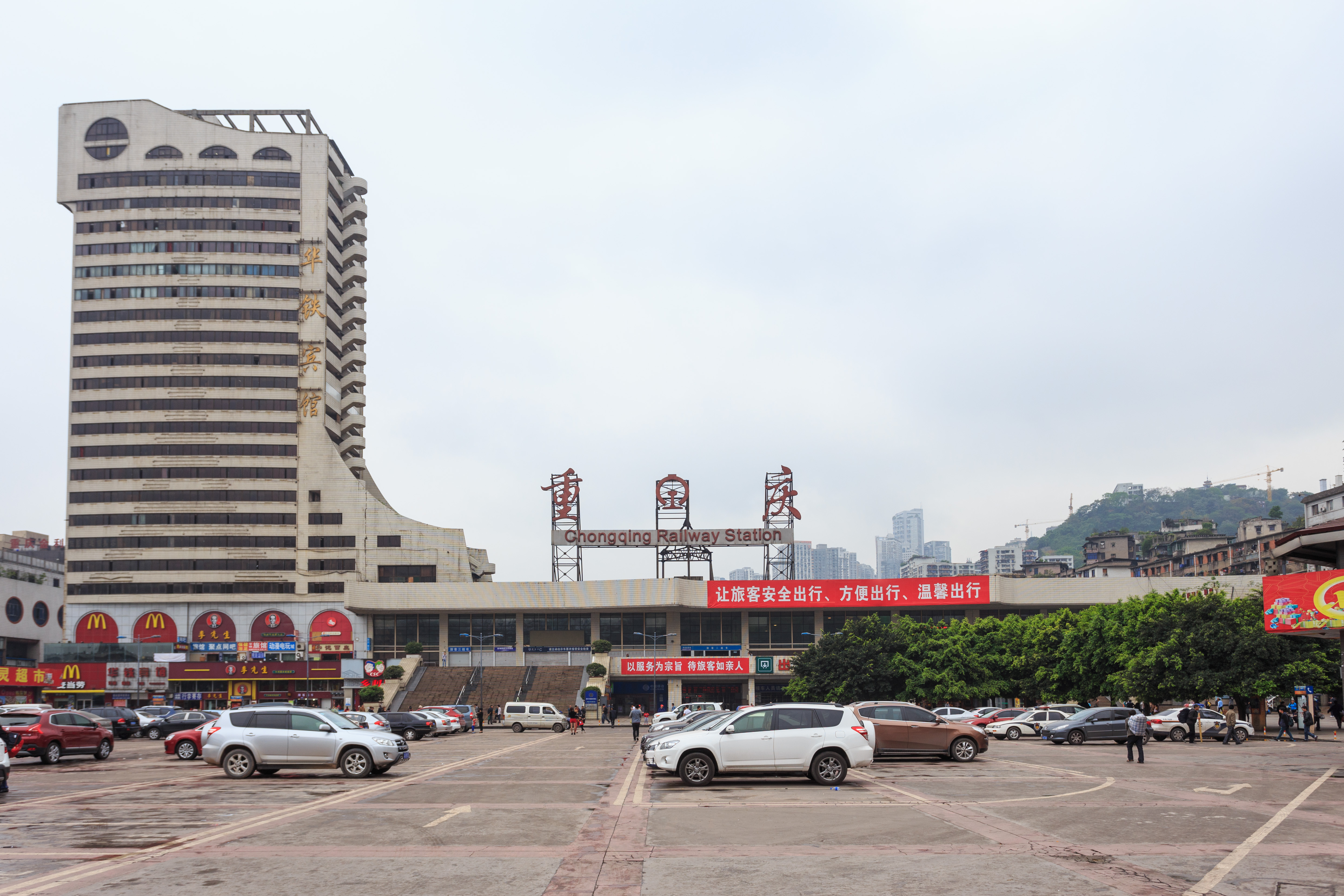
- Station building before demolition

General information
- Other names: Caiyuanba railway station
- Location: Caiyuan Road (菜袁路); Yuzhong District, Chongqing; China
- Coordinates: 29°33′9.5″N 106°32′38.5″E
- Operator: Chengdu Railway Bureau; China Railway Corporation
- Lines: Chuanqian Railway; Chengyu Railway; Xiangyu Railway
- Platforms: 4
- Connections: Bus terminal

History
- Opened: 1952
- Closed: 20 June 2022 (currently undergoing renovations)
Location

Chongqing railway station (simplified Chinese: 重庆站; traditional Chinese: 重慶站; pinyin: Chóngqìng zhàn) is a railway station of Chengyu Railway, Xiangyu Railway, Chuanqian Railway, Chengyu Passenger Railway, that located in People's Republic of China. It is a transportation hub of Chongqing in China.

Once the most important railway station in Chongqing, this station handled virtually all long-distance services to the rest of China. Located between central city area and the Yangtze River, the extremely steep terrain of Chongqing requires the longest escalator in Asia between the station to the commercial districts and Lianglukou station of Chongqing Rail Transit Line 1 and Line 3.

Since the 20th of June, 2022, the station has been closed for major renovations, in line with construction of the Chengdu–Chongqing Intercity Railway. However it still exists as the site of a major bus terminal.

== Structure ==
Chongqing station is a first-class terminus station of the Chengdu-Chongqing Railway, Xiangfan and Sichuan-Guizhou Railway. Due to its unique size and location, the throughput of the station is less than it was 20 years ago (the site is too small, requiring frequent shunting). With the limitations of Chongqing city's unique mountain environment, the station space is very narrow and not be able to further expand the station's capacity. Chongqing station will continue to maintain the same capacity of the 60-year first-class station. Other stations in Chongqing (such as Chongqing North) have been built, upgraded or being planned to handle the increased passenger needs of the city.

== Station layout ==
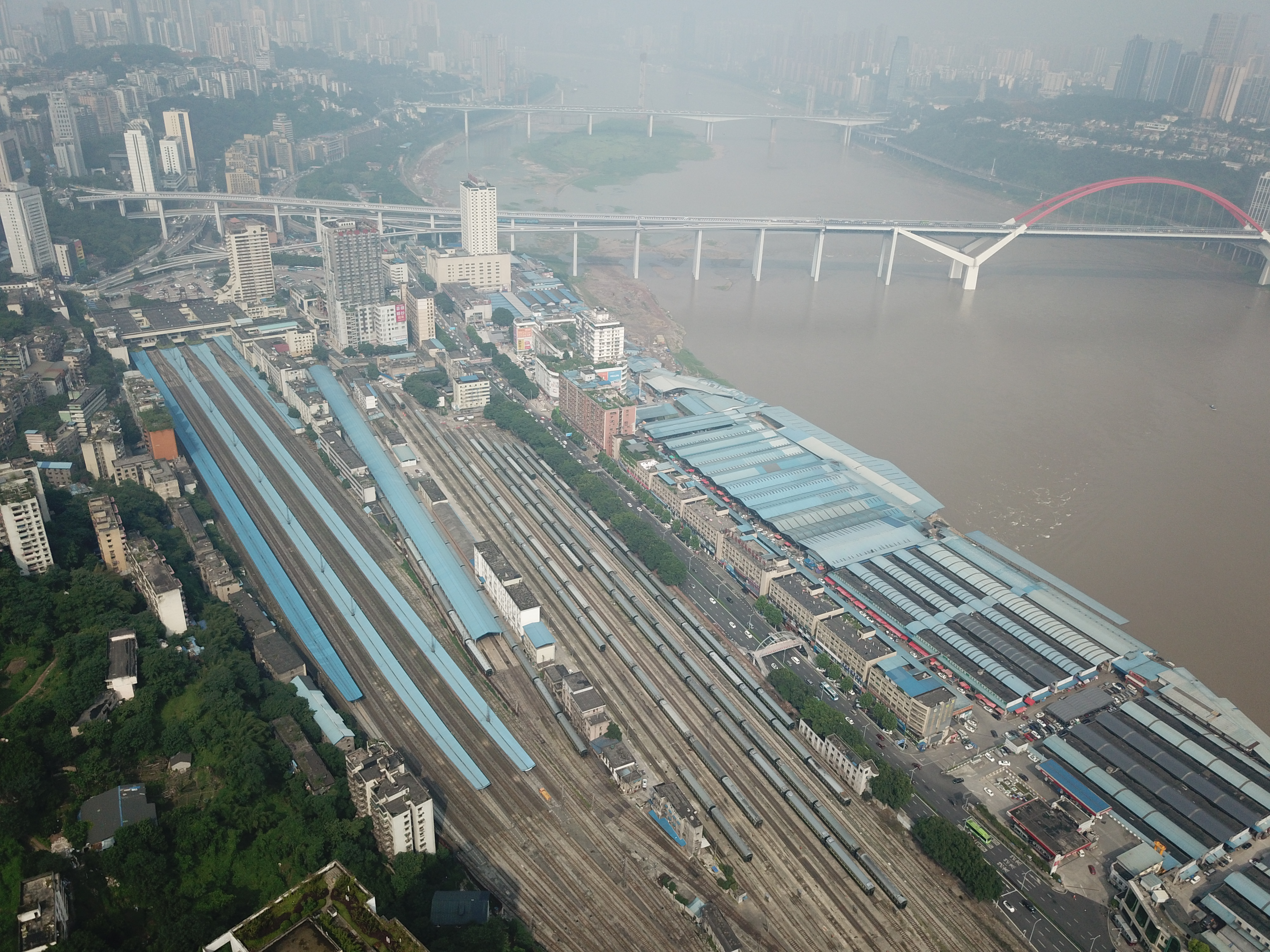
Chongqing Railway Station in 2019

North↑
Yard Layout
1 Track	Buffer |
1 Platform Low Level
2 Platform Low Level
2 Track	Buffer |
3 Track Relief Track	Buffer |
4 Track	Buffer |
3 Platform Low Level
4 Platform Low Level
5 Track	Buffer |
6 Track Relief Track	Buffer |
7 Track	Buffer |
5 Platform Low Level
6 Platform Low Level
8 Track	Buffer |
9 Track	Buffer |
7 Platform Low Level
CRE Sales Department
South↓

== History ==
In 1950, construction started on the station, which was to serve as a terminus of the Chengdu–Chongqing railway, the first railway to be built after the founding of the People's Republic of China. About 1,100 engineers and 3,000 "counter-revolutionary criminals" and other prisoners participated in the construction of the Chongqing Station by reform through labor.

Chongqing station was opened by Marshal Liu in 1952.

Between September 1989 and July 1992, the station underwent major renovations.

In 1992, the Chengdu Railway Bureau attempted to fill in the river or even build an elevated railway station to increase capacity at Chongqing station. However the existing highway and Caiyuanba interchange hub along the Yangtze River forced them to abandon the construction. This caused the expansion of Shapingba railway station. While in Yubei area away from the main city 17 km outside addition to the construction of the new first-class station in Chongqing North railway station to ease passenger pressure at Chongqing station. In addition, some train services were rerouted to Chongqing West railway station, leaving Chongqing station with much fewer travelers.

On 20 June 2022 Chongqing railway station was closed for reconstruction. Once reopened it will be the terminus for the Chengdu-Chongqing railway and for the Chengdu–Chongqing Intercity Railway and Chongqing-Xiamen high-speed railway. A riverside park will established on the roof.

== Metro station ==
Line 18 and Line 27, currently under construction, will serve the railway station.

Currently, the closest metro station is Lianglukou station on Line 1 and Line 3, via the Huangguan Escalator
