= Chengdu–Chongqing railway =

Railway line in China

Chengdu–Chongqing railway 成渝铁路

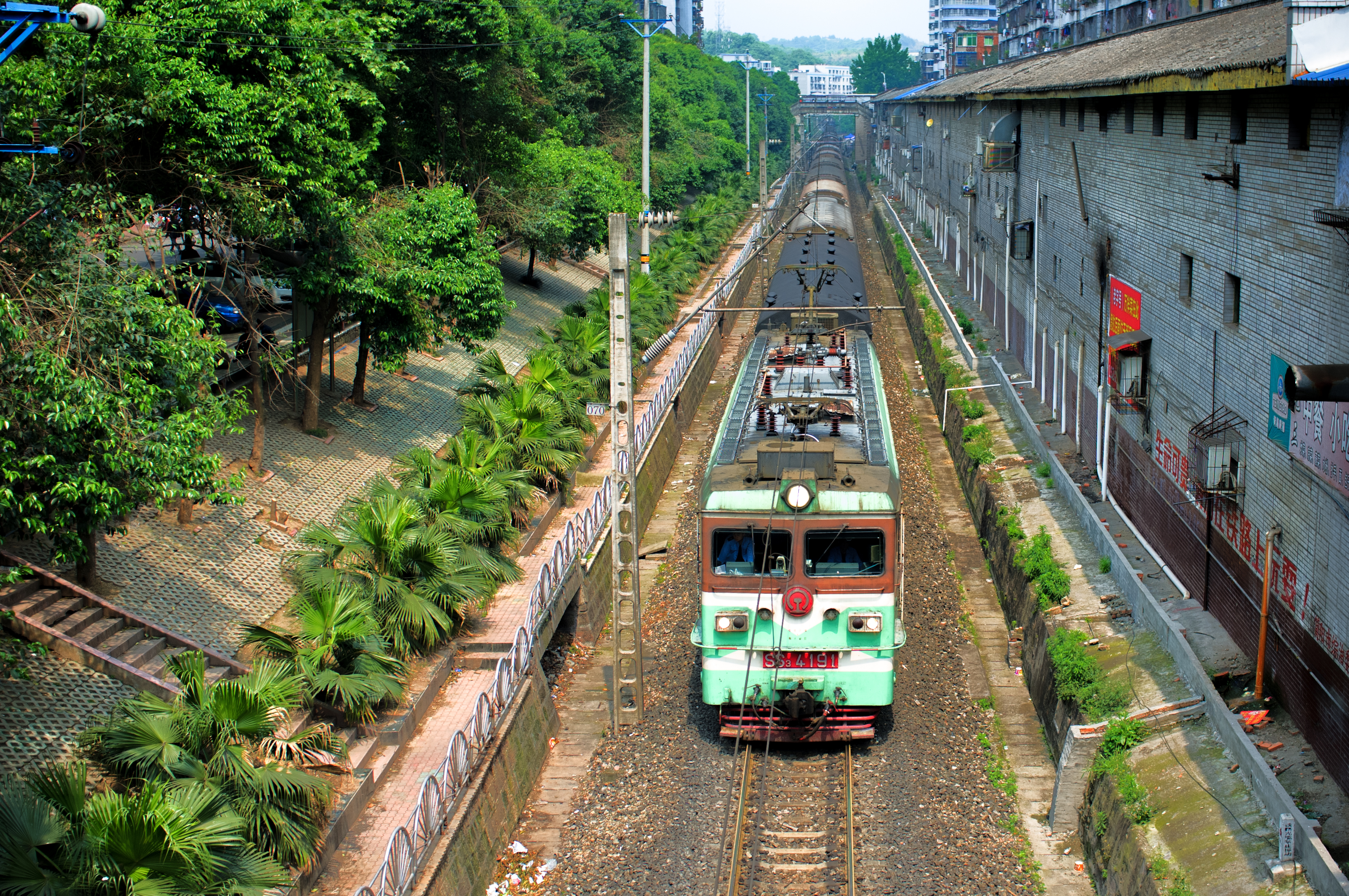
- Line in Jianyang

Overview
- Status: Active
- Termini: Chengdu; Chongqing

Service
- Type: Heavy rail
- Operator(s): China Railway

History
- Commenced: June 15, 1950; 75 years ago
- Completed: June 13, 1952; 73 years ago

Technical
- Line length: 505 km (314 mi)
- Track gauge: 1,435 mm (4 ft 8 1/2 in) standard gauge
- Electrification: 25 kV/50 Hz AC overhead catenary

Chengdu–Chongqing railway or Chengyu railway (simplified Chinese: 成渝铁路; traditional Chinese: 成渝鐵路; pinyin: chéngyú tiělù), is a single-track electrified railroad in the Sichuan Basin of Southwest China between the cities Chengdu and Chongqing. Chongqing's short form name is Yu (渝) and the railway is named after the two cities. The line has a total length of 505 km (314 mi).

The Chengyu railway opened in 1952 and was the first railway to be built after the founding of the People's Republic of China. Other cities along the route include Jianyang, Ziyang, Zizhong, Neijiang, Longchang and Yongchuan. The line is single-track, but duplication commenced between Chongqing and Jiangjin in November 2019.

== History ==
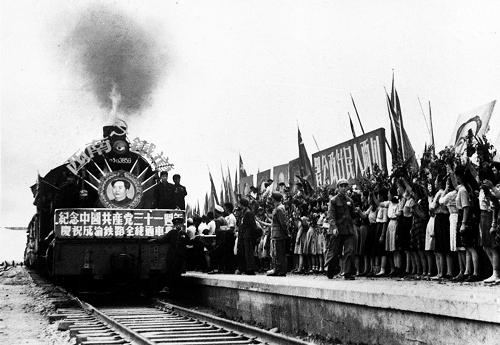
A locomotive adorned with a portrait of Mao Zedong at the opening ceremony of the Chengdu-Chongqing railway on July 1, 1952

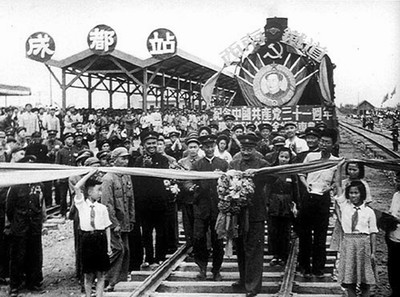
He Long cuts the ribbon at the opening ceremony.

In 1903, a railway line between Chengdu and Chongqing, the two biggest cities in Sichuan, was proposed by Huguang Viceroy Zhang Zhidong as part of a railway from Sichuan to Wuhan. Construction on this line began in 1909 and halted in 1911. Attempts to resume construction in 1936, by the China Development Finance Corporation, and in 1947 ended with the outbreak of the Sino-Japanese War and the Chinese Civil War. On December 31, 1949, shortly after the Chinese Communists captured Sichuan from the Nationalists, Secretary of the Southwest Bureau Deng Xiaoping proposed the building of the railway. Work began on June 15, 1950 and involved 30,000 People's Liberation Army troops and 10,000 civilian laborers. More than 400 private steel mills in Chongqing supplied steel for the line. The line was completed on June 13, 1952, and entered into trial operation on July 1, 1952. It was the first railway line built in China after the establishment of the People's Republic of China.

In 1987, the Chengyu Line was fully electrified, raising annual carrying capacity from 6.1 million tons to 13 million.

The opening of the Chengdu–Chongqing Expressway in 1995 drew passengers away from the railway.

By 2008, the line was transporting 90 million tons of cargo and 70 million passengers per year.

== Passenger service ==
As of 2021, the only remaining passenger service is a one train in each direction per day between Chongqing and Neijiang.

== Other rail lines between Chengdu and Chongqing ==
The opening of the Dazhou–Chengdu railway (via Suining) in 1997, and the Suining–Chongqing Railway in 2006, created another, shorter, railway route between Chengdu and Chongqing, via Suining (the so-called Chengdu–Suining–Chongqing railway), 312 kilometres (194 miles) long. After 2009, high-speed CRH passenger trains ran on that route.

The third railway line between the two cities, the Chengdu-Chongqing high-speed railway, completed on December 26, 2015, accommodates high-speed trains traveling at up to 350 kilometres per hour (217 miles per hour). Although it follows a route generally similar to that of the original Chengdu–Chongqing railway, it is significantly shorter due to the greater use of elevated sections and tunnels.

== Rail junctions ==
- Chengdu: Baoji–Chengdu railway, Chengdu–Kunming railway
- Neijiang: Neijiang–Kunming railway
- Chongqing: Xiangfan–Chongqing railway, Chongqing–Huaihua railway

== See also ==
- List of railways in China
