= List of administrative divisions of Hubei =

Administrative divisions of Hubei, a province of the People's Republic of China

Hubei Province
- Province
- Capital: Wuhan

Prefecture-level divisions
- Sub-provincial cities: 1
- Prefectural cities: 11
- Autonomous prefectures: 1

County level divisions
- Sub-prefectural cities: 3
- County cities: 23
- Counties: 35
- Autonomous counties: 2
- Districts: 39
- Forestry district: 1

Township level divisions
- Towns: 733
- Townships: 201
- Ethnic townships: 9
- Subdistricts: 277

Villages level divisions
- Communities: 4,397
- Administrative villages: 25,061

The administrative divisions of Hubei, a province of the People's Republic of China, consists of prefecture-level divisions subdivided into county-level divisions then subdivided into township-level divisions.

== Administrative divisions ==
All of these administrative divisions are explained in greater detail at Administrative divisions of the People's Republic of China. This chart lists only prefecture-level and county-level divisions of Hubei.

Prefecture level	County Level				
Prefecture level	Name	Chinese	Hanyu Pinyin	Division code	
Wuhan city 武汉市; Wǔhàn Shì (Capital – Sub-provincial) (4201 / WUH)	Jiang'an District	江岸区	Jiāng'àn Qū	420102	JAA
Wuhan city 武汉市; Wǔhàn Shì (Capital – Sub-provincial) (4201 / WUH)	Jianghan District	江汉区	Jiānghàn Qū	420103	JHN
Wuhan city 武汉市; Wǔhàn Shì (Capital – Sub-provincial) (4201 / WUH)	Qiaokou District	硚口区	Qiáokǒu Qū	420104	QKQ
Wuhan city 武汉市; Wǔhàn Shì (Capital – Sub-provincial) (4201 / WUH)	Hanyang District	汉阳区	Hànyáng Qū	420105	HYA
Wuhan city 武汉市; Wǔhàn Shì (Capital – Sub-provincial) (4201 / WUH)	Wuchang District	武昌区	Wǔchāng Qū	420106	WCQ
Wuhan city 武汉市; Wǔhàn Shì (Capital – Sub-provincial) (4201 / WUH)	Qingshan District	青山区	Qīngshān Qū	420107	QSN
Wuhan city 武汉市; Wǔhàn Shì (Capital – Sub-provincial) (4201 / WUH)	Hongshan District	洪山区	Hóngshān Qū	420111	HSQ
Wuhan city 武汉市; Wǔhàn Shì (Capital – Sub-provincial) (4201 / WUH)	Dongxihu District	东西湖区	Dōngxīhú Qū	420112	DXH
Wuhan city 武汉市; Wǔhàn Shì (Capital – Sub-provincial) (4201 / WUH)	Hannan District	汉南区	Hànnán Qū	420113	HNQ
Wuhan city 武汉市; Wǔhàn Shì (Capital – Sub-provincial) (4201 / WUH)	Caidian District	蔡甸区	Càidiàn Qū	420114	CDN
Wuhan city 武汉市; Wǔhàn Shì (Capital – Sub-provincial) (4201 / WUH)	Jiangxia District	江夏区	Jiāngxià Qū	420115	JXQ
Wuhan city 武汉市; Wǔhàn Shì (Capital – Sub-provincial) (4201 / WUH)	Huangpi District	黄陂区	Huángpí Qū	420116	HPI
Wuhan city 武汉市; Wǔhàn Shì (Capital – Sub-provincial) (4201 / WUH)	Xinzhou District	新洲区	Xīnzhōu Qū	420117	XNZ
Huangshi city 黄石市; Huángshí Shì (4202 / HIS)	Huangshigang District	黄石港区	Huángshígǎng Qū	420202	HSG
Huangshi city 黄石市; Huángshí Shì (4202 / HIS)	Xisaishan District	西塞山区	Xīsàishān Qū	420203	XAI
Huangshi city 黄石市; Huángshí Shì (4202 / HIS)	Xialu District	下陆区	Xiàlù Qū	420204	XAL
Huangshi city 黄石市; Huángshí Shì (4202 / HIS)	Tieshan District	铁山区	Tiěshān Qū	420205	TSH
Huangshi city 黄石市; Huángshí Shì (4202 / HIS)	Yangxin County	阳新县	Yángxīn Xiàn	420222	YXE
Huangshi city 黄石市; Huángshí Shì (4202 / HIS)	Daye city	大冶市	Dàyě Shì	420281	DYE
Shiyan city 十堰市; Shíyàn Shì (4203 / SYE)	Maojian District	茅箭区	Máojiàn Qū	420302	MJN
Shiyan city 十堰市; Shíyàn Shì (4203 / SYE)	Zhangwan District	张湾区	Zhāngwān Qū	420303	ZWQ
Shiyan city 十堰市; Shíyàn Shì (4203 / SYE)	Yunyang District	郧阳区	Yúnyáng Qū	420304	YYH
Shiyan city 十堰市; Shíyàn Shì (4203 / SYE)	Yunxi County	郧西县	Yúnxī Xiàn	420322	YNX
Shiyan city 十堰市; Shíyàn Shì (4203 / SYE)	Zhushan County	竹山县	Zhúshān Xiàn	420323	ZHS
Shiyan city 十堰市; Shíyàn Shì (4203 / SYE)	Zhuxi County	竹溪县	Zhúxī Xiàn	420324	ZXX
Shiyan city 十堰市; Shíyàn Shì (4203 / SYE)	Fangxian County (Note: Official name registered by the Ministry of Civil Affairs.)	房县	Fángxiàn	420325	FAG
Shiyan city 十堰市; Shíyàn Shì (4203 / SYE)	Danjiangkou city	丹江口市	Dānjiāngkǒu Shì	420381	DJK
Yichang city 宜昌市; Yíchāng Shì (4205 / YCO)	Xiling District	西陵区	Xīlíng Qū	420502	XLQ
Yichang city 宜昌市; Yíchāng Shì (4205 / YCO)	Wujiagang District	伍家岗区	Wǔjiāgǎng Qū	420503	WJG
Yichang city 宜昌市; Yíchāng Shì (4205 / YCO)	Dianjun District	点军区	Diǎnjūn Qū	420504	DJN
Yichang city 宜昌市; Yíchāng Shì (4205 / YCO)	Xiaoting District	猇亭区	Xiāotíng Qū	420505	XTQ
Yichang city 宜昌市; Yíchāng Shì (4205 / YCO)	Yiling District	夷陵区	Yílíng Qū	420506	YIQ
Yichang city 宜昌市; Yíchāng Shì (4205 / YCO)	Yuan'an County	远安县	Yuǎn'ān Xiàn	420525	YAX
Yichang city 宜昌市; Yíchāng Shì (4205 / YCO)	Xingshan County	兴山县	Xīngshān Xiàn	420526	XSX
Yichang city 宜昌市; Yíchāng Shì (4205 / YCO)	Zigui County	秭归县	Zǐguī Xiàn	420527	ZGI
Yichang city 宜昌市; Yíchāng Shì (4205 / YCO)	Changyang County (Note: Conventional name: Changyang Tujia Autonomous County; Chinese: 长阳土家族自治县; pinyin: Chángyáng Tǔjiāzú Zìzhìxiàn)	长阳县	Chángyáng Xiàn	420528	CYA
Yichang city 宜昌市; Yíchāng Shì (4205 / YCO)	Wufeng County (Note: Conventional name: Wufeng Tujia Autonomous County; Chinese: 五峰土家族自治县; pinyin: Wǔfēng Tǔjiāzú Zìzhìxiàn)	五峰县	Wǔfēng Xiàn	420529	WFG
Yichang city 宜昌市; Yíchāng Shì (4205 / YCO)	Yidu city	宜都市	Yídū Shì	420581	YID
Yichang city 宜昌市; Yíchāng Shì (4205 / YCO)	Dangyang city	当阳市	Dāngyáng Shì	420582	DYS
Yichang city 宜昌市; Yíchāng Shì (4205 / YCO)	Zhijiang city	枝江市	Zhījiāng Shì	420583	ZIJ
Xiangyang city 襄阳市; Xiāngyang Shì (4206 / XYB)	Xiangcheng District	襄城区	Xiāngchéng Qū	420602	XXF
Xiangyang city 襄阳市; Xiāngyang Shì (4206 / XYB)	Fancheng District	樊城区	Fánchéng Qū	420606	FNC
Xiangyang city 襄阳市; Xiāngyang Shì (4206 / XYB)	Xiangzhou District	襄州区	Xiāngzhōu Qū	420607	XZA
Xiangyang city 襄阳市; Xiāngyang Shì (4206 / XYB)	Nanzhang County	南漳县	Nánzhāng Xiàn	420624	NZH
Xiangyang city 襄阳市; Xiāngyang Shì (4206 / XYB)	Gucheng County	谷城县	Gǔchéng Xiàn	420625	GUC
Xiangyang city 襄阳市; Xiāngyang Shì (4206 / XYB)	Baokang County	保康县	Bǎokāng Xiàn	420626	BKG
Xiangyang city 襄阳市; Xiāngyang Shì (4206 / XYB)	Laohekou city	老河口市	Lǎohékǒu Shì	420682	LHK
Xiangyang city 襄阳市; Xiāngyang Shì (4206 / XYB)	Zaoyang city	枣阳市	Zǎoyáng Shì	420683	ZOY
Xiangyang city 襄阳市; Xiāngyang Shì (4206 / XYB)	Yicheng city	宜城市	Yíchéng Shì	420684	YCW
Ezhou city 鄂州市; Èzhōu Shì (4207 / EZS)	Liangzihu District	梁子湖区	Liángzǐhú Qū	420702	LZI
Ezhou city 鄂州市; Èzhōu Shì (4207 / EZS)	Huarong District	华容区	Huáróng Qū	420703	HRQ
Ezhou city 鄂州市; Èzhōu Shì (4207 / EZS)	Echeng District	鄂城区	Èchéng Qū	420704	ECQ
Jingmen city 荆门市; Jīngmén Shì (4208 / JMS)	Dongbao District	东宝区	Dōngbǎo Qū	420802	DBQ
Jingmen city 荆门市; Jīngmén Shì (4208 / JMS)	Duodao District	掇刀区	Duōdāo Qū	420804	DOQ
Jingmen city 荆门市; Jīngmén Shì (4208 / JMS)	Shayang County	沙洋县	Shāyáng Xiàn	420822	SYF
Jingmen city 荆门市; Jīngmén Shì (4208 / JMS)	Zhongxiang city	钟祥市	Zhōngxiáng Shì	420881	ZXS
Jingmen city 荆门市; Jīngmén Shì (4208 / JMS)	Jingshan city	京山市	Jīngshān Shì	420882	
Xiaogan city 孝感市; Xiàogǎn Shì (4209 / XGE)	Xiaonan District	孝南区	Xiàonán Qū	420902	XNA
Xiaogan city 孝感市; Xiàogǎn Shì (4209 / XGE)	Xiaochang County	孝昌县	Xiàochāng Xiàn	420921	XOC
Xiaogan city 孝感市; Xiàogǎn Shì (4209 / XGE)	Dawu County	大悟县	Dàwù Xiàn	420922	DWU
Xiaogan city 孝感市; Xiàogǎn Shì (4209 / XGE)	Yunmeng County	云梦县	Yúnmèng Xiàn	420923	YMX
Xiaogan city 孝感市; Xiàogǎn Shì (4209 / XGE)	Yingcheng city	应城市	Yìngchéng Shì	420981	YCG
Xiaogan city 孝感市; Xiàogǎn Shì (4209 / XGE)	Anlu city	安陆市	Ānlù Shì	420982	ALU
Xiaogan city 孝感市; Xiàogǎn Shì (4209 / XGE)	Hanchuan city	汉川市	Hànchuān Shì	420984	HCH
Jingzhou city 荆州市; Jīngzhōu Shì (4210 / JGZ)	Shashi District	沙市区	Shāshì Qū	421002	SSJ
Jingzhou city 荆州市; Jīngzhōu Shì (4210 / JGZ)	Jingzhou District	荆州区	Jīngzhōu Qū	421003	JZQ
Jingzhou city 荆州市; Jīngzhōu Shì (4210 / JGZ)	Gong'an County	公安县	Gōng'ān Xiàn	421022	GGA
Jingzhou city 荆州市; Jīngzhōu Shì (4210 / JGZ)	Jiangling County	江陵县	Jiānglíng Xiàn	421024	JLX
Jingzhou city 荆州市; Jīngzhōu Shì (4210 / JGZ)	Shishou city	石首市	Shíshǒu Shì	421081	SSO
Jingzhou city 荆州市; Jīngzhōu Shì (4210 / JGZ)	Honghu city	洪湖市	Hónghú Shì	421083	HHU
Jingzhou city 荆州市; Jīngzhōu Shì (4210 / JGZ)	Songzi city	松滋市	Sōngzī Shì	421087	SZF
Jingzhou city 荆州市; Jīngzhōu Shì (4210 / JGZ)	Jianli city	监利市	Jiànlì Shì	421088	
Huanggang city 黄冈市; Huánggāng Shì (4211 / HGE)	Huangzhou District	黄州区	Huángzhōu Qū	421102	HZC
Huanggang city 黄冈市; Huánggāng Shì (4211 / HGE)	Tuanfeng County	团风县	Tuánfēng Xiàn	421121	TFG
Huanggang city 黄冈市; Huánggāng Shì (4211 / HGE)	Hong'an County	红安县	Hóng'ān Xiàn	421122	HGA
Huanggang city 黄冈市; Huánggāng Shì (4211 / HGE)	Luotian County	罗田县	Luótián Xiàn	421123	LTE
Huanggang city 黄冈市; Huánggāng Shì (4211 / HGE)	Yingshan County	英山县	Yīngshān Xiàn	421124	YSE
Huanggang city 黄冈市; Huánggāng Shì (4211 / HGE)	Xishui County	浠水县	Xīshuǐ Xiàn	421125	XSE
Huanggang city 黄冈市; Huánggāng Shì (4211 / HGE)	Qichun County	蕲春县	Qíchūn Xiàn	421126	QCN
Huanggang city 黄冈市; Huánggāng Shì (4211 / HGE)	Huangmei County	黄梅县	Huángméi Xiàn	421127	HGM
Huanggang city 黄冈市; Huánggāng Shì (4211 / HGE)	Macheng city	麻城市	Máchéng Shì	421181	MCS
Huanggang city 黄冈市; Huánggāng Shì (4211 / HGE)	Wuxue city	武穴市	Wǔxué Shì	421182	WXE
Xianning city 咸宁市; Xiánníng Shì (4212 / XNS)	Xian'an District	咸安区	Xián'ān Qū	421202	XAN
Xianning city 咸宁市; Xiánníng Shì (4212 / XNS)	Jiayu County	嘉鱼县	Jiāyú Xiàn	421221	JYX
Xianning city 咸宁市; Xiánníng Shì (4212 / XNS)	Tongcheng County	通城县	Tōngchéng Xiàn	421222	TCX
Xianning city 咸宁市; Xiánníng Shì (4212 / XNS)	Chongyang County	崇阳县	Chóngyáng Xiàn	421223	CGY
Xianning city 咸宁市; Xiánníng Shì (4212 / XNS)	Tongshan County	通山县	Tōngshān Xiàn	421224	TSA
Xianning city 咸宁市; Xiánníng Shì (4212 / XNS)	Chibi city	赤壁市	Chìbì Shì	421281	CBI
Suizhou city 随州市; Suízhōu Shì (4213 / SZR)	Zengdu District	曾都区	Zēngdū Qū	421303	ZED
Suizhou city 随州市; Suízhōu Shì (4213 / SZR)	Suixian County	随县	Suíxiàn	421321	SUA
Suizhou city 随州市; Suízhōu Shì (4213 / SZR)	Guangshui city	广水市	Guǎngshuǐ Shì	421381	GSS
Enshi Prefecture (Note: Conventional name: Enshi Tujia and Miao Autonomous Prefecture; Chinese: 恩施土家族苗族自治州; pinyin: Ēnshī Tǔjiāzú Miáozú Zìzhìzhōu) 恩施州; Ēnshī Zhōu (4228 / ESH)	Enshi city	恩施市	Ēnshī Shì	422801	ESS
Enshi Prefecture 恩施州; Ēnshī Zhōu (4228 / ESH)	Lichuan city	利川市	Lìchuān Shì	422802	LCE
Enshi Prefecture 恩施州; Ēnshī Zhōu (4228 / ESH)	Jianshi County	建始县	Jiànshǐ Xiàn	422822	JSE
Enshi Prefecture 恩施州; Ēnshī Zhōu (4228 / ESH)	Badong County	巴东县	Bādōng Xiàn	422823	BDG
Enshi Prefecture 恩施州; Ēnshī Zhōu (4228 / ESH)	Xuan'en County	宣恩县	Xuān'ēn Xiàn	422825	XEN
Enshi Prefecture 恩施州; Ēnshī Zhōu (4228 / ESH)	Xianfeng County	咸丰县	Xiánfēng Xiàn	422826	XFG
Enshi Prefecture 恩施州; Ēnshī Zhōu (4228 / ESH)	Laifeng County	来凤县	Láifèng Xiàn	422827	LFG
Enshi Prefecture 恩施州; Ēnshī Zhōu (4228 / ESH)	Hefeng County	鹤峰县	Hèfēng Xiàn	422828	HEF
Directly administered (4290)	Xiantao city	仙桃市	Xiāntáo Shì	429004	XNT
Directly administered (4290)	Qianjiang city	潜江市	Qiánjiāng Shì	429005	QNJ
Directly administered (4290)	Tianmen city	天门市	Tiānmén Shì	429006	TMS
Directly administered (4290)	Shennongjia Forestry District	神农架林区	Shénnóngjià Línqū	429021	SNJ

== Recent changes in administrative divisions ==
Date	Before	After	Note	Reference
1980-04-20	Hefeng County	Hefeng County (Aut.)	reorganized	
1981-11-07	Chengguan, Enshi (CC-Town)	Enshi (PC-City)	reorganized	
1983-01-18	all Province-controlled city (P-City) → Prefecture-level city (PL-City)			Civil Affairs Announcement
1983-01-18	all Prefecture-controlled city (PC-City) → County-level city (CL-City)			Civil Affairs Announcement
1983-08-19	Xiaogan Prefecture	Wuhan (PL-City)	transferred	
1983-08-19	↳ Huangpi County	↳ Huangpi County	transferred	
1983-08-19	Huanggang Prefecture	Wuhan (PL-City)	transferred	
1983-08-19	↳ Xinzhou County	↳ Xinzhou County	transferred	
1983-08-19	Xiangyang Prefecture	Xiangfan (PL-City)	merged into	
1983-08-19	Sui County	Suizhou (CL-City)	merged into	
1983-08-19	Guanghua County	Laohekou (CL-City)	merged into	
1983-08-19	parts of Huanggang Prefecture	Ezhou (PL-City) city district	established	
1983-08-19	↳ Echeng (CL-City)	Ezhou (PL-City) city district	disestablished	
1983-08-19	↳ Echeng County	Ezhou (PL-City) city district	disestablished	
1983-08-19	parts of Jingzhou Prefecture	Jingmen (PL-City) city district	established	
1983-08-19	↳ Jingmen County	Jingmen (PL-City) city district	disestablished	
1983-08-19	Yunyang Prefecture	provincial-controlled	transferred	
1983-08-19	↳ Shennongjia Forestry District	↳ Shennongjia Forestry District	transferred	
1983-08-19	Xiaogan County	Xiaogan (CL-City)	reorganized	
1983-08-19	Xianning County	Xianning (CL-City)	reorganized	
1983-08-19	Jun County	Danjiangkou (CL-City)	reorganized	
1983-08-19	Enshi Prefecture	Exi Prefecture (Aut.)	reorganized & renamed	
1983-08-19	Hefeng County (Aut.)	Hefeng County	transferred & reorganized	
1983-08-19	Laifeng County (Aut.)	Laifeng County	transferred & reorganized	
1983-08-19	Enshi County	Enshi (CL-City)	merged into	
1984-04-27	Xiangfan (PL-City) city district	Xiangcheng District	established	
1984-04-27	Xiangfan (PL-City) city district	Xiangdong District	established	
1984-04-27	Xiangfan (PL-City) city district	Xiangxi District	established	
1984-04-27	Xiangfan (PL-City) city district	Jiao District, Xiangfan	established	
1984-04-27	Shiyan (PL-City) city district	Maojian District	established	
1984-04-27	Shiyan (PL-City) city district	Zhangwan District	established	
1984-04-27	parts of Hanyang County	Hannan District	established	
1984-07-13	Wufeng County	Wufeng County (Aut.)	reorganized	
1984-07-13	Changyang County	Changyang County (Aut.)	reorganized	
1985-??-??	Ezhou (PL-City) city district	Echeng District	established	
1985-??-??	Ezhou (PL-City) city district	Huangzhou District	established	
1985-??-??	Jingmen (PL-City) city district	Dongbao District	established	
1985-??-??	Jingmen (PL-City) city district	Shayang District	established	
1986-05-27	Lichuan County	Lichuan (CL-City)	reorganized	
1986-05-27	Macheng County	Macheng (CL-City)	reorganized	
1986-05-27	Mianyang County	Xiantao (CL-City)	reorganized	
1986-05-27	Puqi County	Puqi (CL-City)	reorganized	
1986-05-27	Shishou County	Shishou (CL-City)	reorganized	
1986-05-27	Yingcheng County	Yingcheng (CL-City)	reorganized	
1986-12-13	Yichang (PL-City) city district	Xiling District	established	
1986-12-13	Yichang (PL-City) city district	Wujiagang District	established	
1986-12-13	Yichang (PL-City) city district	Dianjun District	established	
1987-02-27	parts of Ezhou (PL-City)	Huanggang Prefecture	transferred	
1987-02-27	↳ Huangzhou District	↳ Huanggang County	transferred & merged into	
1987-07-31	Honghu County	Honghu (CL-City)	reorganized	
1987-08-03	Tianmen County	Tianmen (CL-City)	reorganized	
1987-08-10	parts of Echeng District	Liangzihu District	established	
1987-08-10	parts of Echeng District	Huarong District	established	
1987-09-04	Anlu County	Anlu (CL-City)	reorganized	
1987-10-23	Guangji County	Wuxue (CL-City)	reorganized	
1987-11-30	Yidu County	Zhicheng (CL-City)	reorganized	
1988-01-08	Zaoyang County	Zaoyang (CL-City)	reorganized	
1988-05-25	Qianjiang County	Qianjiang (CL-City)	reorganized	
1988-10-11	Yingshan County	Guangshui (CL-City)	reorganized	
1988-10-22	Dangyang County	Dangyang (CL-City)	reorganized	
1990-12-26	Huanggang County	Huangzhou (CL-City)	reorganized	
1992-05-20	Yichang Prefecture	Yichang (PL-City)	merged into	State Council [1992]72
1992-09-12	Hanyang County	Caidian District	reorganized	Civil Affairs [1992]101
1993-04-04	Exi Prefecture (Aut.)	Enshi Prefecture (Aut.)	renamed	State Council [1993]36
1993-04-10	Xiaogan Prefecture	Xiaogan (PL-City)	reorganized	State Council [1993]46
1993-04-10	Xiaogan (CL-City)	Xiaonan District	reorganized	State Council [1993]46
1994-02-18	Daye County	Daye (CL-City)	reorganized	Civil Affairs [1994]29
1994-06-10	Yicheng County	Yicheng (CL-City)	reorganized	Civil Affairs [1994]93
1994-09-29	Shiyan Prefecture	Shiyan (PL-City)	merged into	State Council [1994]98
1994-04-10	Jingzhou Prefecture	Jingsha (PL-City)	reorganized	State Council [1993]99
1994-04-10	Sha (CL-City)	Shashi District	reorganized	State Council [1993]99
1994-04-10	Xiaogan (CL-City)	Jingzhou District	reorganized	State Council [1993]99
1994-04-10	Xiaogan (CL-City)	Jiangning District	reorganized	State Council [1993]99
1994-04-10	parts of Jingzhou Prefecture	provincial-controlled	transferred	State Council [1993]99
1994-04-10	↳ Xiantao (CL-City)	↳ Xiantao (CL-City)	transferred	State Council [1993]99
1994-04-10	↳ Qianjiang (CL-City)	↳ Qianjiang (CL-City)	transferred	State Council [1993]99
1994-04-10	↳ Tianmen (CL-City)	↳ Tianmen (CL-City)	transferred	State Council [1993]99
1995-03-21	parts of Yichang County	Xiaoting District	established	State Council [1995]5
1995-03-28	Wuchang County	Jiangxia District	reorganized	State Council [1995]23
1995-10-22	Jiao District, Xiangfan	Xiangcheng District	merged into	State Council [1995]100
1995-10-22	Fandong District	Fancheng District	disestablished & merged	State Council [1995]100
1995-10-22	Fanxi District	Fancheng District	disestablished & merged	State Council [1995]100
1995-12-23	Huanggang Prefecture	Huanggang (PL-City)	reorganized	State Council [1995]130
1995-12-23	Huangzhou (CL-City)	Huangzhou District	reorganized	State Council [1995]130
1995-12-29	Songzi County	Songzi (CL-City)	reorganized	Civil Affairs [1995]86
1996-07-30	Zhijiang County	Zhijiang (CL-City)	reorganized	Civil Affairs [1996]51
1996-12-29	Jingsha (PL-City)	Jingzhou (PL-City)	renamed	State Council [1996]99
1996-12-29	parts of Jingzhou (PL-City)	Jingmen (PL-City)	transferred	State Council [1996]111
1996-12-29	↳ Jingshan County	↳ Jingshan County	transferred	State Council [1996]111
1996-12-29	↳ Zhongxiang (CL-City)	↳ Zhongxiang (CL-City)	transferred	State Council [1996]111
1996-12-29	parts of Xianning Prefecture	Huangshi (PL-City)	transferred	State Council [1996]112
1996-12-29	↳ Yangxin County	↳ Yangxin County	transferred	State Council [1996]112
1997-03-12	Hanchuan County	Hanchuan (CL-City)	reorganized	
1998-06-11	Zhicheng (CL-City)	Yidu (CL-City)	renamed	
1998-06-11	Puqi (CL-City)	Chibi (CL-City)	renamed	Civil Affairs [1998]22
1998-07-02	Jiangling District	Jiangling County	reorganized	
1998-09-15	Xinzhou County	Xinzhou District	reorganized	State Council [1998]77
1998-09-15	Huangpi County	Huangpi District	reorganized	State Council [1998]77
1998-12-06	Xianning Prefecture	Xianning (PL-City)	reorganized	
1998-12-06	Xianning (CL-City)	Xian'an District	reorganized	
1998-12-09	Shayang District	Shayang County	reorganized	
2000-06-25	provincial-controlled	Suizhou (PL-City)	established	
2000-06-25	↳ Suizhou (CL-City)	↳ Zengdu District	transferred & reorganized	
2000-06-25	parts of Xiaogan (PL-City)	Suizhou (PL-City)	transferred	
2000-06-25	↳ Guangshui (CL-City)	↳ Guangshui (CL-City)	transferred	
2001-03-19	parts of Dongbao District	Duodao District	established	State Council [2001]25
2001-03-22	Yichang County	Yiling District	reorganized	State Council [2001]28
2001-08-31	Xiangzhou County	Xiangzhou District	reorganized	State Council [2001]93
2001-10-20	Shihuiyao District	Xisaishan District	renamed	Civil Affairs [2001]301
2009-03-23	parts of Zengdu District	Sui County	established	State Council [2009]35
2010-11-26	Xiangfan (PL-City)	Xiangyang (PL-City)	renamed	State Council [2010]129
2010-11-26	Xiangyang District	Xiangzhou District	renamed	State Council [2010]129
2014-09-09	Yun County	Yunyang District	reorganized	State Council [2014]118
2018-02-22	Jingshan County	Jingshan (CL-city)	reorganized	Civil Affairs [2018]51
2020-07-??	Jianli County	Jianli (CL-city)	reorganized	

== Population composition ==
=== Prefectures ===
Prefecture	2010	2000
Wuhan	9,785,392	8,048,091
Ezhou	1,082,653	
Huanggang	7,442,450	7,256,674
Huangshi	2,429,318	
Jingmen	2,873,687	
Jingzhou	5,691,707	
Shiyan	3,340,843	
Suizhou	2,162,222	
Xiangyang	5,500,307	
Xianning	2,462,583	
Xiaogan	4,814,542	
Yichang	4,059,686	
Enshi	3,290,294	

=== County level divisions ===
Name	Prefecture	2010
Jiang'an	Wuhan	895,635
Jianghan	Wuhan	683,492
Qiaokou	Wuhan	828,644
Hanyang	Wuhan	792,183
Wuchang	Wuhan	1,199,127
Qingshan	Wuhan	485,375
Hongshan	Wuhan	1,549,917
Dongxihu	Wuhan	451,880
Hannan	Wuhan	114,970
Caidian	Wuhan	410,888
Jiangxia	Wuhan	644,835
Huangpi	Wuhan	874,938
Xinzhou	Wuhan	848,760
Huangshigang	Huangshi	362,611
Xisaishan	Huangshi	233,708
Xialu	Huangshi	110,925
Tieshan	Huangshi	57,327
Yangxin	Huangshi	827,631
Daye	Huangshi	837,116
Maojian	Shiyan	399,449
Zhangwan	Shiyan	368,471
Yun(xian)	Shiyan	558,355
Yunxi	Shiyan	447,484
Zhushan	Shiyan	417,081
Zhuxi	Shiyan	315,257
Fang(xian)	Shiyan	390,991
Danjiangkou	Shiyan	443,755
Xiling	Yichang	512,074
Wujiagang	Yichang	214,194
Dianjun	Yichang	103,696
Xiaoting	Yichang	61,230
Yiling	Yichang	520,186
Yuan'an	Yichang	184,532
Xingshan	Yichang	170,630
Zigui	Yichang	367,107
Changyang	Yichang	388,228
Wufeng	Yichang	188,923
Yidu	Yichang	384,598
Dangyang	Yichang	468,293
Zhijiang	Yichang	495,995
Xiangcheng	Xiangyang	485,934
Fancheng	Xiangyang	808,798
Xiangyang → Xiangzhou	Xiangyang	904,957
Nanzhang	Xiangyang	533,661
Gucheng	Xiangyang	523,607
Baokang	Xiangyang	254,597
Laohekou	Xiangyang	471,482
Zaoyang	Xiangyang	1,004,741
Yicheng	Xiangyang	512,530
Liangzihu	Ezhou	142,608
Huarong	Ezhou	237,333
Echeng	Ezhou	668,731
Dongbao	Jingmen	360,984
Duodao	Jingmen	271,970
Jingshan	Jingmen	636,776
Shayang	Jingmen	581,443
Zhongxiang	Jingmen	1,022,514
Xiaonan	Xiaogan	908,266
Xiaochang	Xiaogan	588,666
Dawu	Xiaogan	614,902
Yunmeng	Xiaogan	524,799
Yingcheng	Xiaogan	593,812
Anlu	Xiaogan	568,590
Hanchuan	Xiaogan	1,015,507
Shashi	Jingzhou	600,330
Jingzhou	Jingzhou	553,756
Gong'an	Jingzhou	881,128
Jianli	Jingzhou	1,162,770
Jiangling	Jingzhou	331,344
Shishou	Jingzhou	577,022
Honghu	Jingzhou	819,446
Songzi	Jingzhou	765,911
Huangzhou	Huanggang	366,769
Tuanfeng	Huanggang	338,613
Hong'an	Huanggang	602,156
Luotian	Huanggang	544,650
Yingshan	Huanggang	357,296
Xishui	Huanggang	872,650
Qichun	Huanggang	727,821
Huangmei	Huanggang	858,806
Macheng	Huanggang	849,092
Wuxue	Huanggang	644,219
Xian'an	Xianning	512,517
Jiayu	Xianning	319,196
Tongcheng	Xianning	380,758
Chongyang	Xianning	410,623
Tongshan	Xianning	361,079
Chibi	Xianning	478,410
Zengdu	Suizhou	618,582
Sui(xian)	Suizhou	755,910
Guangshui	Suizhou	787,730
Enshi	Enshi	749,609
Lichuan	Enshi	654,197
Jianshi	Enshi	411,936
Badong	Enshi	420,798
Xuan'en	Enshi	310,390
Xianfeng	Enshi	300,648
Laifeng	Enshi	242,920
Hefeng	Enshi	199,796
Xiantao	Directly administered	1,175,085
Qianjiang	Directly administered	946,277
Tianmen	Directly administered	1,418,913
Shennongjia	Directly administered	76,140
