= Meidian Reservoir =

- Location within China
- Location: Northern suburbs of Huangpi District, Wuhan
- Coordinates: 31.203°N 114.310°E
- Construction began: September 1965

Meidian Reservoir (simplified Chinese: 梅店水库; traditional Chinese: 梅店水庫; pinyin: Méidiàn shuǐkù), also known as Sunshine Lake, is a large-sized reservoir in Huangpi District, Wuhan City, Hubei Province, China, located on the Lishu River, a tributary of Sheshui River.

The main project of Meidian Reservoir started in September 1965 and was basically completed in March 1969. It is the largest reservoir in Wuhan. The dam of the Reservoir is 31.4 meters high, with a water surface area of 1333.3 hectares and a total storage capacity of 163.54 million cubic meters.
