= Xiajiasi Reservoir =

- Interactive map of Xiajiasi Reservoir
- Location: Huangpi District, Wuhan City
- Coordinates: 31.095°N 114.475°E
- Purpose: irrigation, flood control
- Construction began: November 1959

Xiajiasi Reservoir (simplified Chinese: 夏家寺水库; traditional Chinese: 夏家寺水庫; pinyin: Yuànjī sì shuǐkù), also known as Mulan Lake, is a large-sized reservoir in Mulan Township, northeast of Huangpi District, Wuhan City, Hubei Province, China, located at the upper reaches of Xajiasi River, a tributary of the She River. It is a large water conservancy project mainly for irrigation and flood control, and also has comprehensive benefits such as breeding and tourism.

The construction of Xiajiasi Reservoir started in November 1959 and was completed in November 1965. The reservoir has a dam height of 30.8 meters, with a surface area of 2,000 hectares and a storage capacity of 253.5 million cubic meters.
