= Daxin, Hubei =

Daxin 大新镇
- Town
- Location in Hubei
- Coordinates: 31°43′15″N 114°9′17″E
- Country: People's Republic of China
- Province: Hubei
- Prefecture-level city: Xiaogan
- County: Dawu County
- Time zone: UTC+8 (China Standard)

Daxin (Chinese: 大新; pinyin: Dàxīn) is a town under the administration of Dawu County, Hubei, China. As of 2020, it administers Daxin Residential Neighborhood and the following 23 villages:

- Daxin Village
- Shidun Village (十墩村)
- Shencheng Village (沈城村)
- Shanghe Village (上河村)
- Changshan Village (长山村)
- Sugu Village (粟谷村)
- Yufan Village (余畈村)
- Tangfan Village (汤畈村)
- Xinhe Village (新河村)
- Taoyuan Village (桃园村)
- Jiangshan Village (江山村)
- Yaohe Village (窑河村)
- Yaotang Village (窑塘村)
- Tuqiao Village (土桥村)
- Xiangyang Village (向阳村)
- Wutong Village (五童村)
- Heping Village (和平村)
- Jiugang Village (九岗村)
- Louwan Village (楼湾村)
- Jianxin Village (建新村)
- Bakoutang Village (八口塘村)
- Xinqiao Village (新桥村)
- Shangchong Village (上冲村)
