= Dading =

Dading (Wade–Giles: Ta-ting) may refer to:

- Da Ding, second king of the Shang dynasty
- Dafang County, Guizhou, China, formerly called Dading
- Dading (TV series), a 2014 Filipino family drama series
- Dading Subdistrict (大定街道), a subdistrict in Mengzhou, Henan, Henan, China
- Dading, a village in Liuji, Dawu County, Xiaogan, Hubei, China

== Historical eras ==
- Dading (大定, 555–562), era name used by Emperor Xuan of Western Liang
- Dading (大定, 581), era name used by Emperor Jing of Northern Zhou
- Dading (大定, 1161–1189), era name used by Emperor Shizong of Jin
- Dading (大定, 1361–1363), era name used by Chen Youliang, emperor of Dahan
