= DXH =

DXH or dxh can refer to:

- East Star Airlines, a now-defunct airline from 2005 to 2009 based in Wuhan, Hubei, China, by ICAO code
- Dubai Health Experience, which contains Thumbay Hospital
- Duhai, a train station in Uttar Pradesh, India; see List of railway stations in India#D
- dxh (ᶢᵏǁʰ), a click consonant in the Juǀʼhoan language of Botswana and Namibia
- Dongxihu District, a district of Wuhan, Hubei, China; see List of administrative divisions of Hubei
