= Huarong =

Huarong may refer to the following locations in China:

- Huarong County (华容县), Hunan
- Huarong District (华容区), Ezhou, Hubei
  - Huarong Town (华容镇), town in and seat of Huarong District

== See also ==
- China Huarong Asset Management
