= Liuji =

Liuji (simplified Chinese: 刘集; traditional Chinese: 劉集; pinyin: Liújí), derived from the Standard Mandarin pinyin 'Liújí', may refer to:

== China ==
- Liuji Community, Liuji, in Liuji, Dawu County, Xiaogan, Hubei
- Liuji Subdistrict, in Xiangzhou District, Xiangyang, Hubei

=== Towns ===
The following towns are known as Liújí (simplified Chinese: 刘集镇; traditional Chinese: 劉集鎮; pinyin: Liújí Zhèn) in Standard Mandarin pinyin:

- Liuji, Guzhen County, in Guzhen County, Bengbu, Anhui
- Liuji, Dengzhou, in Dengzhou, Nanyang, Henan
- Liuji, Zhongmu County, in Zhongmu County, Zhengzhou, Henan
- Liuji, Xiaogan, in Dawu County, Xiaogan, Hubei
- Liuji, Shuyang County, in Shuyang County, Suqian, Jiangsu
- Liuji, Xuzhou, in Tongshan District, Xuzhou, Jiangsu
- Liuji, Yizheng, in Yizheng, Yangzhou, Jiangsu
- Liuji, Shaanxi, in Fuping County, Weinan, Shaanxi
- Liuji, Shandong, in Dong'e County, Liaocheng, Shandong

=== Townships ===
The following locations are known as Liuji Township (simplified Chinese: 刘集乡; traditional Chinese: 劉集鄉; pinyin: Liújí Xiāng):

- Liuji Township, Fengtai County, in Fengtai County, Huainan, Anhui
- Liuji Township, Yingshang County, in Yingshang County, Fuyang, Anhui
- Liuji Township, Gansu, in Jishishan Bonan, Dongxiang and Salar Autonomous County, Linxia Hui Autonomous Prefecture, Gansu
- Liuji Township, Hebei, in Jing County, Hengshui, Hebei
- Liuji Township, Henan, in Yucheng County, Shangqiu, Henan

=== Villages ===
- Liuji, Wulipu, in Wulipu, Shayang County, Jingmen, Hubei
- Liuji Village, Liuji, in Liuji, Dawu County, Xiaogan, Hubei
- Liuji, Zhucheng, in Zhucheng Subdistrict, Xinzhou District, Wuhan, Hubei

== See also ==
- Dongliuji, a town in Wuhe County, Bengbu, Anhui
- Xiangyang Liuji Airport, an airport in Xiangyang, Hubei
