= Yuanjisi Reservoir =

Dam in Huangpi District, Wuhan

- Interactive map of Yuanjisi Reservoir
- Location: Huangpi District, Wuhan
- Coordinates: 31.107°N 114.303°E
- Construction began: October 1958

Yuanjisi Reservoir (simplified Chinese: 院基寺水库; traditional Chinese: 院基寺水庫; pinyin: Yuànjī sì shuǐkù), or Yuanji Temple Reservoir, also known as Moon Lake, is a middle-sized reservoir in Huangpi District, Wuhan City, Hubei Province, China, located in the upper reaches of Bomogang River, a tributary of Sheshui River.

The reservoir has a water surface area of 533.3 hectares with a total storage capacity of 104.8 million cubic meters.

== History ==
The construction of Yuanjisi Reservoir started in October 1958, employing more than 20,000 people in Huangpi County at the time, and was completed in January 1961.
