= Mulan, Huangpi =

Mulan 木兰乡
- Township
- Location in Hubei
- Coordinates: 31°6′7″N 114°27′24″E
- Country: People's Republic of China
- Province: Hubei
- Prefecture-level city: Wuhan
- District: Huangpi
- Time zone: UTC+8 (China Standard)

Mulan (simplified Chinese: 木兰乡; traditional Chinese: 木蘭鄉; pinyin: Mùlán Xiāng) is a township of Huangpi District in northeastern Hubei province, China.
