= Baokang County =

Baokang County 保康县 Paokang
- County
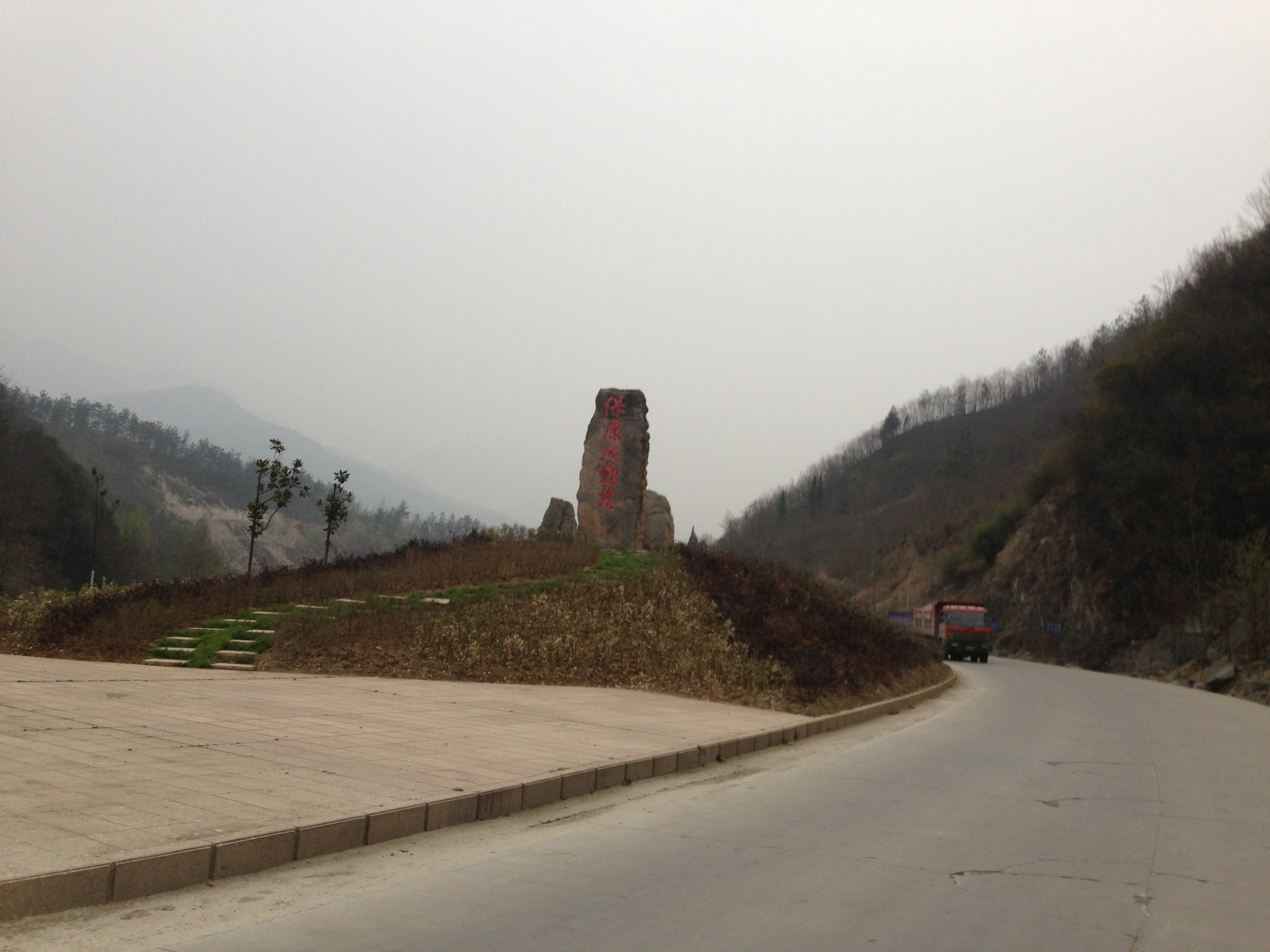
- Baokang County

- Location in Hubei
- Coordinates: 31°43′N 111°11′E
- Country: People's Republic of China
- Province: Hubei
- Prefecture-level city: Xiangyang

Area
  - Total: 3,225 km^{2} (1,245 sq mi)

Population (2020)
  - Total: 223,622
  - Density: 69.34/km^{2} (179.6/sq mi)
- Time zone: UTC+8 (China Standard)
- Website: baokang.gov.cn

Baokang County (simplified Chinese: 保康县; traditional Chinese: 保康縣; pinyin: Bǎokāng Xiàn) is a county of northwestern Hubei province, People's Republic of China. It is under the administration of Xiangyang City.

== Administrative divisions ==
Ten towns:

- Chengguan (*Chengguan (城关镇), Huangbao (黄堡镇)城关镇), Huangbao (黄堡镇), Houping (后坪镇), Longping (龙坪镇), Dianya (店垭镇), Maliang (马良镇), Xiema (歇马镇), Maqiao (马桥镇), Siping (寺坪镇), Guoduwan (过渡湾镇)

The only township is Liangyu Township (两峪乡)

== Climate ==
Climate data for Baokang, elevation 328 m (1,076 ft), (1991–2020 normals, extremes 1981–present)
Month	Jan	Feb	Mar	Apr	May	Jun	Jul	Aug	Sep	Oct	Nov	Dec	Year
Record high °C (°F)	21.6 (70.9)	25.1 (77.2)	36.2 (97.2)	37.0 (98.6)	40.0 (104.0)	40.5 (104.9)	41.2 (106.2)	40.6 (105.1)	41.6 (106.9)	33.5 (92.3)	29.6 (85.3)	23.2 (73.8)	41.6 (106.9)
Mean daily maximum °C (°F)	9.2 (48.6)	12.2 (54.0)	17.5 (63.5)	23.8 (74.8)	27.6 (81.7)	31.0 (87.8)	33.0 (91.4)	31.6 (88.9)	27.2 (81.0)	22.2 (72.0)	16.7 (62.1)	11.3 (52.3)	21.9 (71.5)
Daily mean °C (°F)	3.2 (37.8)	5.8 (42.4)	10.6 (51.1)	16.4 (61.5)	20.6 (69.1)	24.4 (75.9)	26.8 (80.2)	25.6 (78.1)	21.3 (70.3)	16.0 (60.8)	10.2 (50.4)	5.0 (41.0)	15.5 (59.9)
Mean daily minimum °C (°F)	−0.5 (31.1)	1.7 (35.1)	5.9 (42.6)	11.2 (52.2)	15.7 (60.3)	19.9 (67.8)	23.0 (73.4)	22.1 (71.8)	17.8 (64.0)	12.4 (54.3)	6.4 (43.5)	1.2 (34.2)	11.4 (52.5)
Record low °C (°F)	−7.4 (18.7)	−7.1 (19.2)	−3.4 (25.9)	−0.9 (30.4)	5.6 (42.1)	11.8 (53.2)	15.6 (60.1)	13.9 (57.0)	10.2 (50.4)	−0.5 (31.1)	−3.2 (26.2)	−11.7 (10.9)	−11.7 (10.9)
Average precipitation mm (inches)	14.0 (0.55)	20.7 (0.81)	43.5 (1.71)	63.9 (2.52)	105.6 (4.16)	109.1 (4.30)	154.1 (6.07)	177.9 (7.00)	83.8 (3.30)	71.2 (2.80)	38.1 (1.50)	13.3 (0.52)	895.2 (35.24)
Average precipitation days (≥ 0.1 mm)	6.8	7.4	9.4	10.7	12.6	12.6	15.4	14.5	11.8	11.1	8.7	6.3	127.3
Average snowy days	6.1	4.5	1.7	0.1	0	0	0	0	0	0	0.9	2.9	16.2
Average relative humidity (%)	69	69	68	69	72	74	78	79	79	78	76	71	74
Mean monthly sunshine hours	101.3	97.4	126.9	148.7	155.7	150.2	161.9	154.7	118.1	110.5	107.6	108.4	1,541.4
Percentage possible sunshine	32	31	34	38	36	35	38	38	32	32	34	35	35
Source: China Meteorological Administration

== Regional Specialty ==
=== Crepe Myrtle ===
Native in the mountains, Crepe Myrtle is named as the official flower for the county. Crepe Myrtle in Baokang is known for its varieties and long history. Baokang county has six species of Crepe Myrtle.Some specimens are reportedly over 1,000 years old, though this requires further botanical verification.

=== Hotsprings ===
The county possesses geothermal resources, particularly in the Guoduwan area, where mineral-rich hot springs have been developed into local eco-tourism attractions.

=== Mineral Resources ===
Baokang County possesses significant mineral reserves. Geological surveys have identified 24 types of mineral resources in the area, with the potential volume of 12 types having been determined, making it a notable phosphorus-producing region in Hubei Province. Metal mineral resources in this area include iron, manganese, vanadium, copper, lead and zinc, multi-metal, and alumina. Non-metal mineral resources include phosphorus, coal, sulfur, calcite, rock crystal, barite, and fluorite.

=== Wood Ear ===
Wood ear, sometimes also called Jews ear, is a type of fungus that grow on logs and wet ground. Baokang county is known for its high quality product of both black wood ear and white wood ear.

=== Wild Calyx Canthus ===
The county is home to the Wild Flower Valley Natural Scenic Area, a protected nature reserve located north of the county seat. The area is noted for its biodiversity, including ancient plant communities and rare species such as wild peony, rhododendron, and various medicinal plants.
