= Xiaonan, Xiaogan =

Xiaonan 孝南区
- District
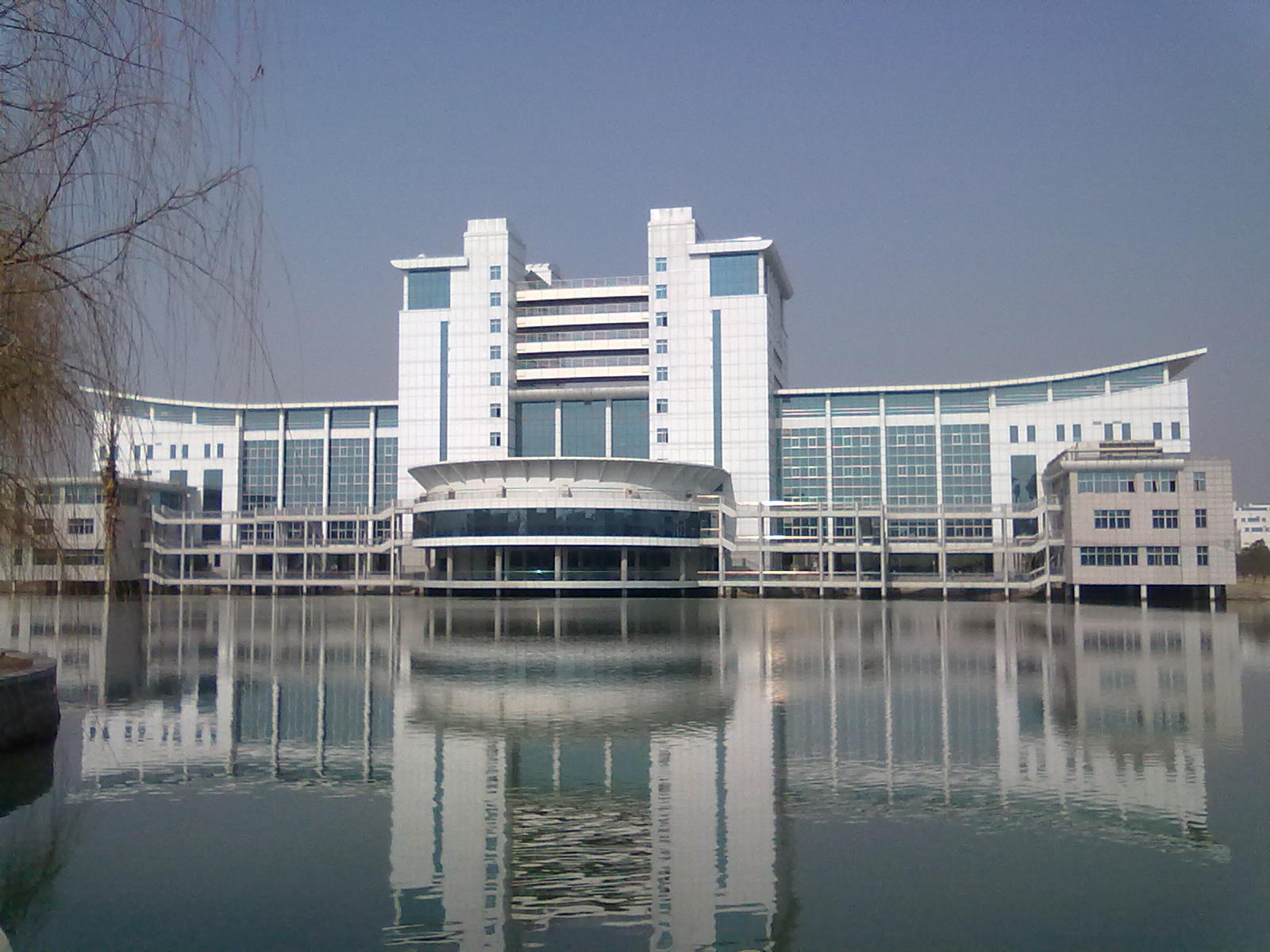
- Xiaogan University

- Location in Hubei
- Coordinates: 30°58′31″N 113°56′38″E
- Country: China
- Province: Hubei
- Prefecture-level city: Xiaogan
- District seat: Shuyuan Subdistrict

Area
  - Total: 1,018.32 km^{2} (393.18 sq mi)

Population (2020 census)
  - Total: 988,479
  - Density: 970.696/km^{2} (2,514.09/sq mi)
- Time zone: UTC+8 (China Standard)
- Website: www.xiaonan.gov.cn

Xiaonan District (simplified Chinese: 孝南区; traditional Chinese: 孝南區; pinyin: Xiàonán Qū) is a district of the city of Xiaogan, Hubei, China. It is under the administration of Xiaogan City.

== Administrative divisions ==
The district is divided into 4 subdistricts, 8 towns, 3 townships and 6 township-level areas.

Four subdistricts are: Shuyuan Subdistrict (书院街道), Xinhua Subdistrict (新华街道), Guangchang Subdistrict (广场街道), Chezhan Subdistrict (车站街道).

Eight towns are: Xinpu (新铺镇), Xihe (西河镇), Yangdian (杨店镇), Dougang (陡岗镇), Xiaogang (肖港镇), Maochen (毛陈镇), Sancha (三汊镇), Zhuzhan (祝站镇).

Three townships are: Pengxing Township (朋兴乡), Wolong Township (卧龙乡), Minji Township (闵集乡).

Six other areas: Xiaonan Economic Development Area (孝南区经济开发区), Zhuhu Farm (朱湖农场), Dongshantou Stock Station (东山头原种场), Danyang Management Office (孝感开发区丹阳办事处), Xiaotian Management Office (孝感开发区孝天办事处), Huaiyin Management Office (孝感开发区槐荫办事处).
