= Huarong, Ezhou =

Huarong 华容区
- District
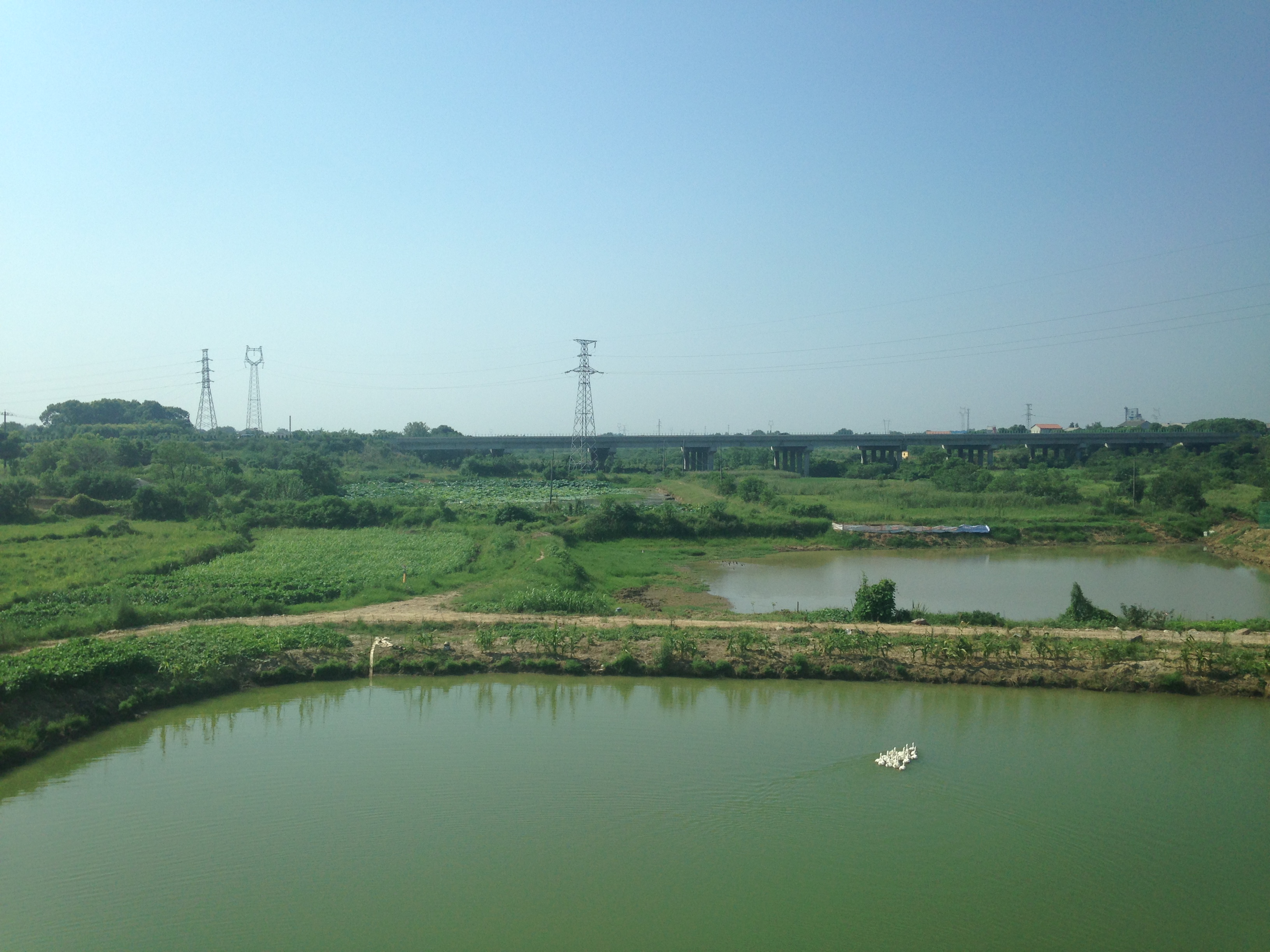
- View near Huarong Town

- Location in Hubei
- Coordinates: 30°32′03″N 114°43′48″E
- Country: People's Republic of China
- Province: Hubei
- Prefecture-level city: Ezhou

Area
  - Total: 482.5 km^{2} (186.3 sq mi)

Population (2020 census)
  - Total: 256,834
  - Density: 532.3/km^{2} (1,379/sq mi)
- Time zone: UTC+8 (China Standard)
- Website: 华容区政府门户网站 (translation: Huarong District Government Web Portal (in Simplified Chinese)

Huarong District (simplified Chinese: 华容区; traditional Chinese: 華容區; pinyin: Huáróng Qū) is a district of the city of Ezhou, Hubei province, People's Republic of China. The district is named after Huarong Town, the name of which is of disputed origin. Huarong (華容) is mentioned in the Romance of the Three Kingdoms.

Huarong is mostly rural. It is mostly located on the right (southern) bank of the Yangtze River, between Ezhou's main urban area (Echeng District) and Liangzihu District in the south and Hongshan District and Jiangxia District of the city of Wuhan in the west. Huarong District faces Xinzhou District and Tuanfeng County across the Yangtze to the north, and Huangzhou District to the east. The district administers islands in the Yangtze including part of Sand Islet (沙洲) near Echeng District and part of People's Islet (人民洲) near Tuanfeng County.

== Geography ==
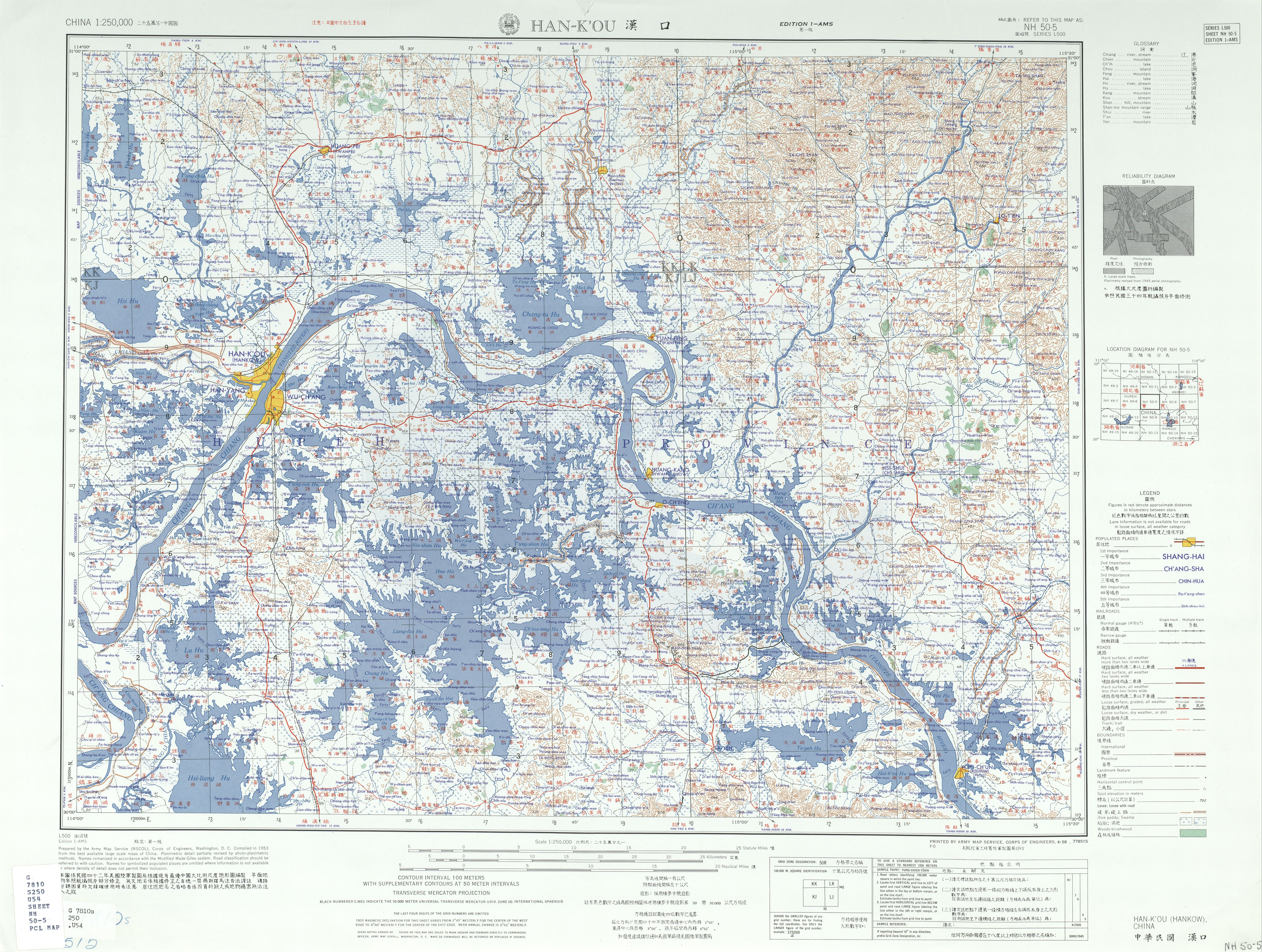
Map including Huarong (labeled as Hua-jung-chen 華容鎮) (1953)

=== Administrative divisions ===
As of 2017, Huarong District administered three towns and two townships:

#	Name	Chinese (S)	Pinyin Romanization
Towns
1	Huarong Town (Hua-jung) meaning disputed	华容镇/华蓉镇	Huáróng Zhèn
2	Duandian Town (Tuan-chia-tien) Duan Store	段店镇	Duàndiàn Zhèn
3	Miaoling Town (Miao-ling) Temple Ridge	庙岭镇	Miàolǐng Zhèn
former	Gedian Town Ge Store	葛店镇	Gědiàn Zhèn
former	Hulin Town Hu Forest	胡林镇	Húlín Zhèn
Townships
4	Putuan Township Putuan	蒲团乡	Pútuán Xiāng
5	Linjiang Township Near the River (Yangtze)	临江乡	Línjiāng Xiāng
former	Dawan Township Great Bay	大湾乡	Dàwān Xiāng
former	Niji Township Mud Rock (now Niji Village)	泥矶村 (formerly 泥矶乡)	Níjī Cūn(Xiāng)

== Transportation ==
Huarong is served by the Wuhan–Jiujiang Railway and Wuhan–Jiujiang passenger railway.

== Gallery ==
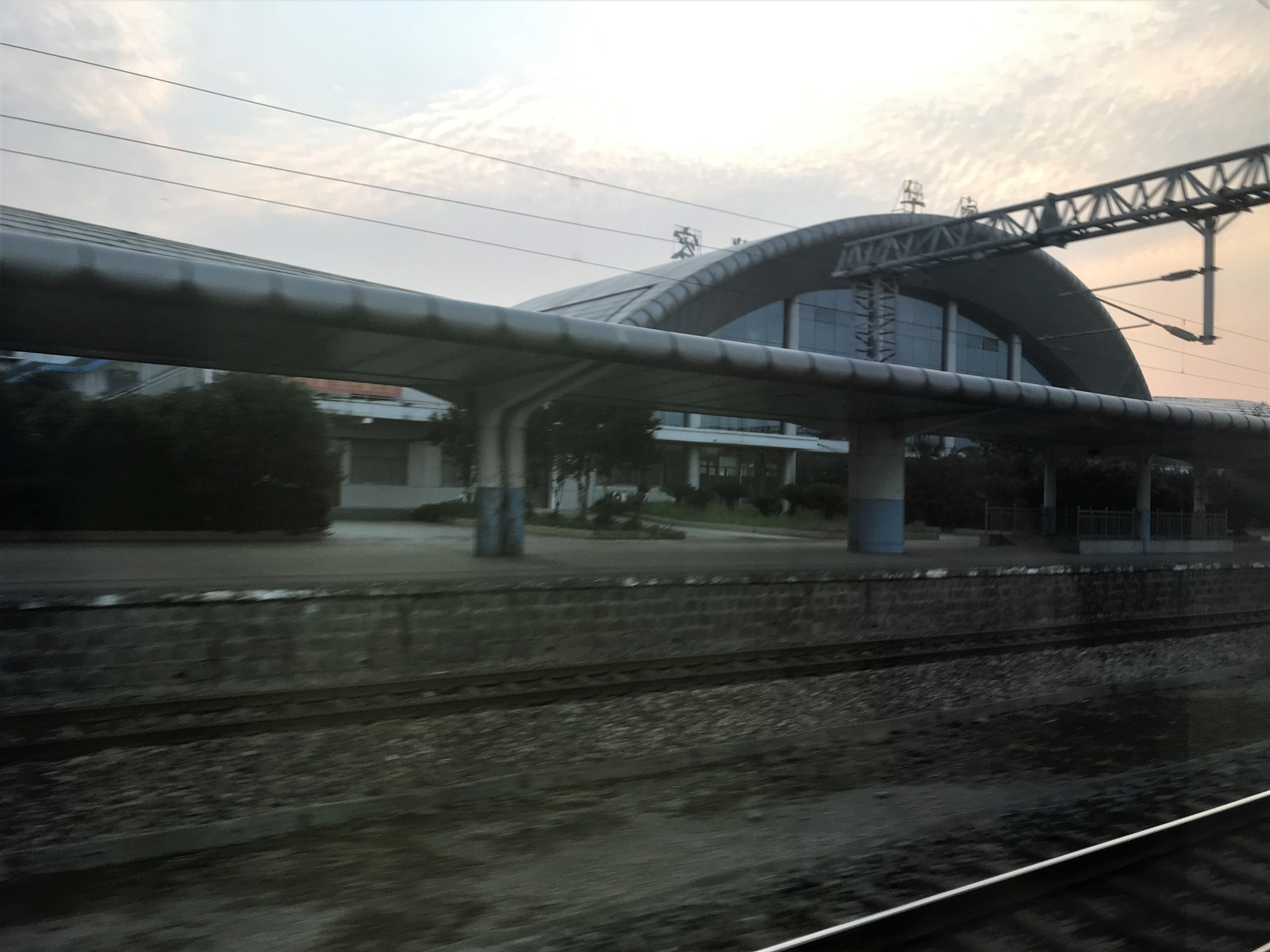
View of Huarong Station

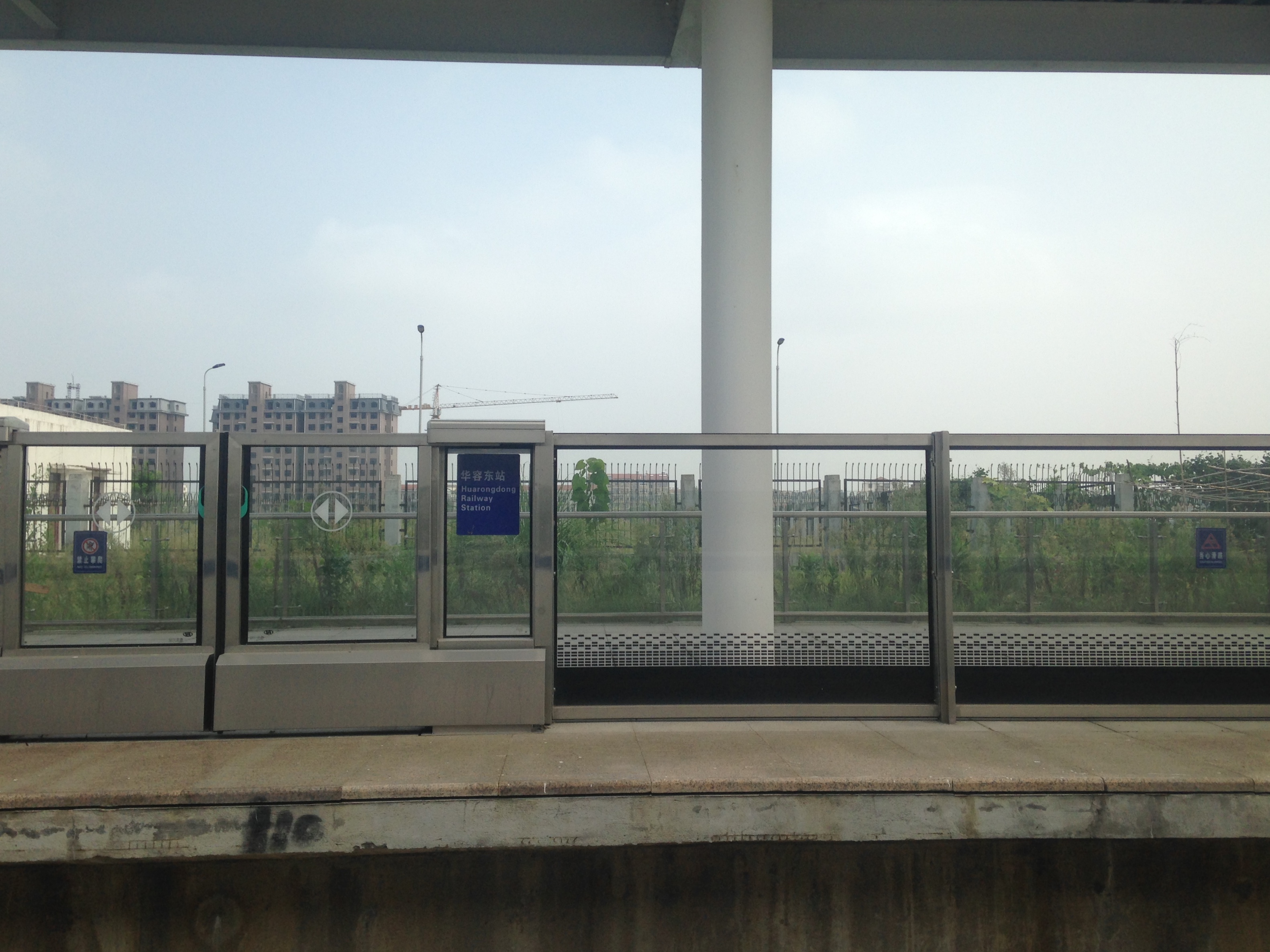
Platform of Huarong East Station

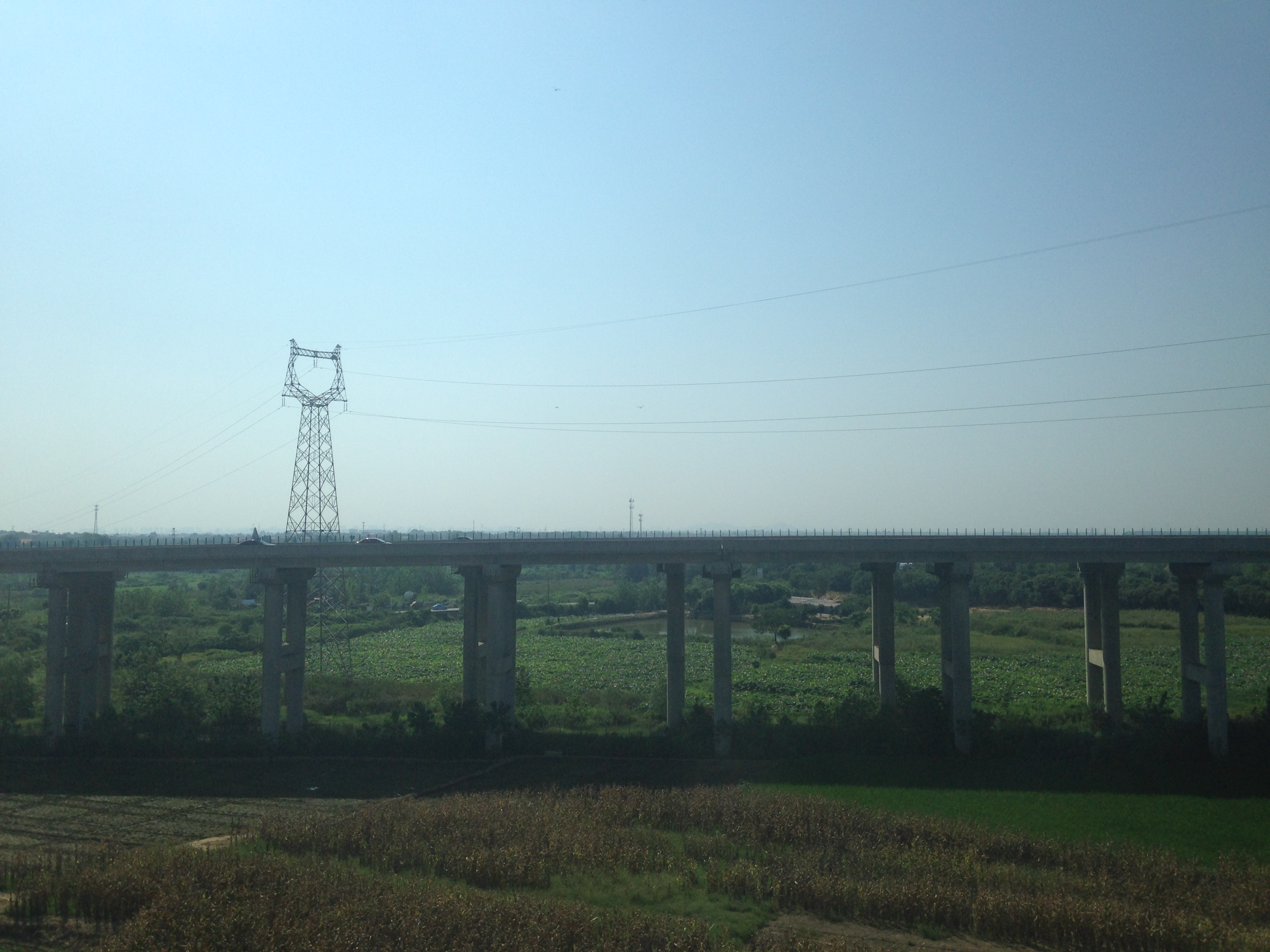
View near Huarong Town, Huarong

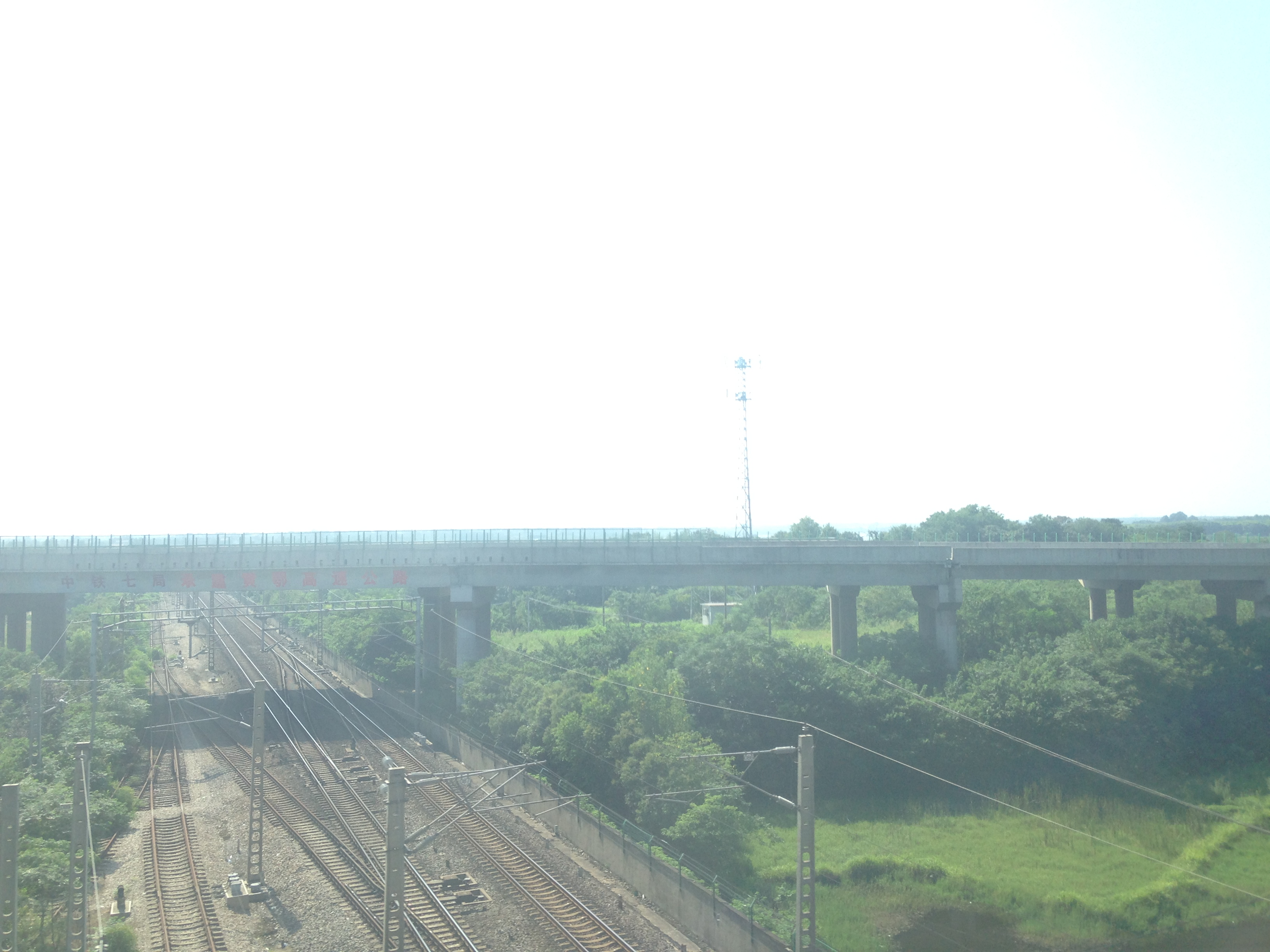
View near Huarong Town, Huarong

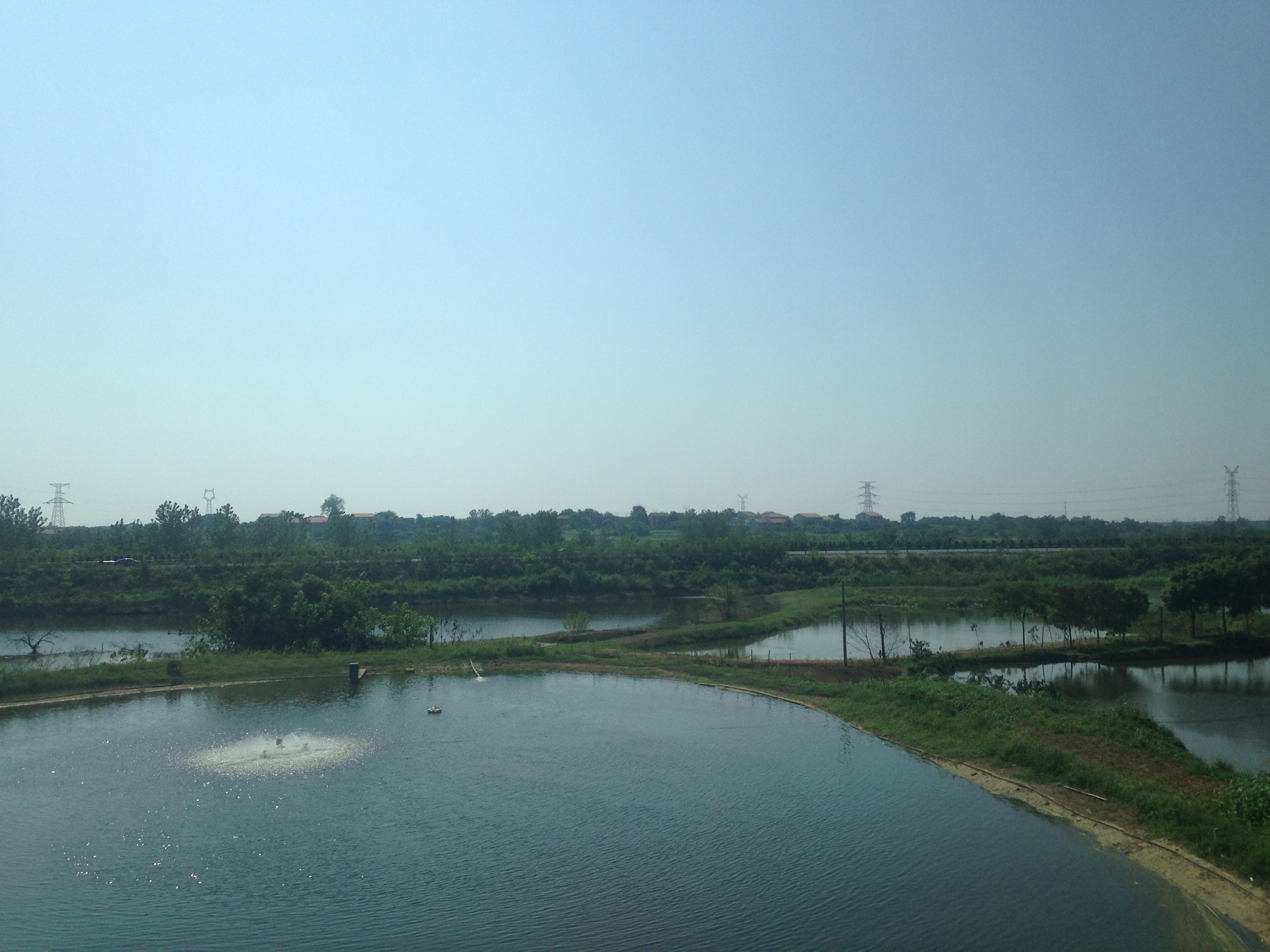
View near Huarong Town, Huarong

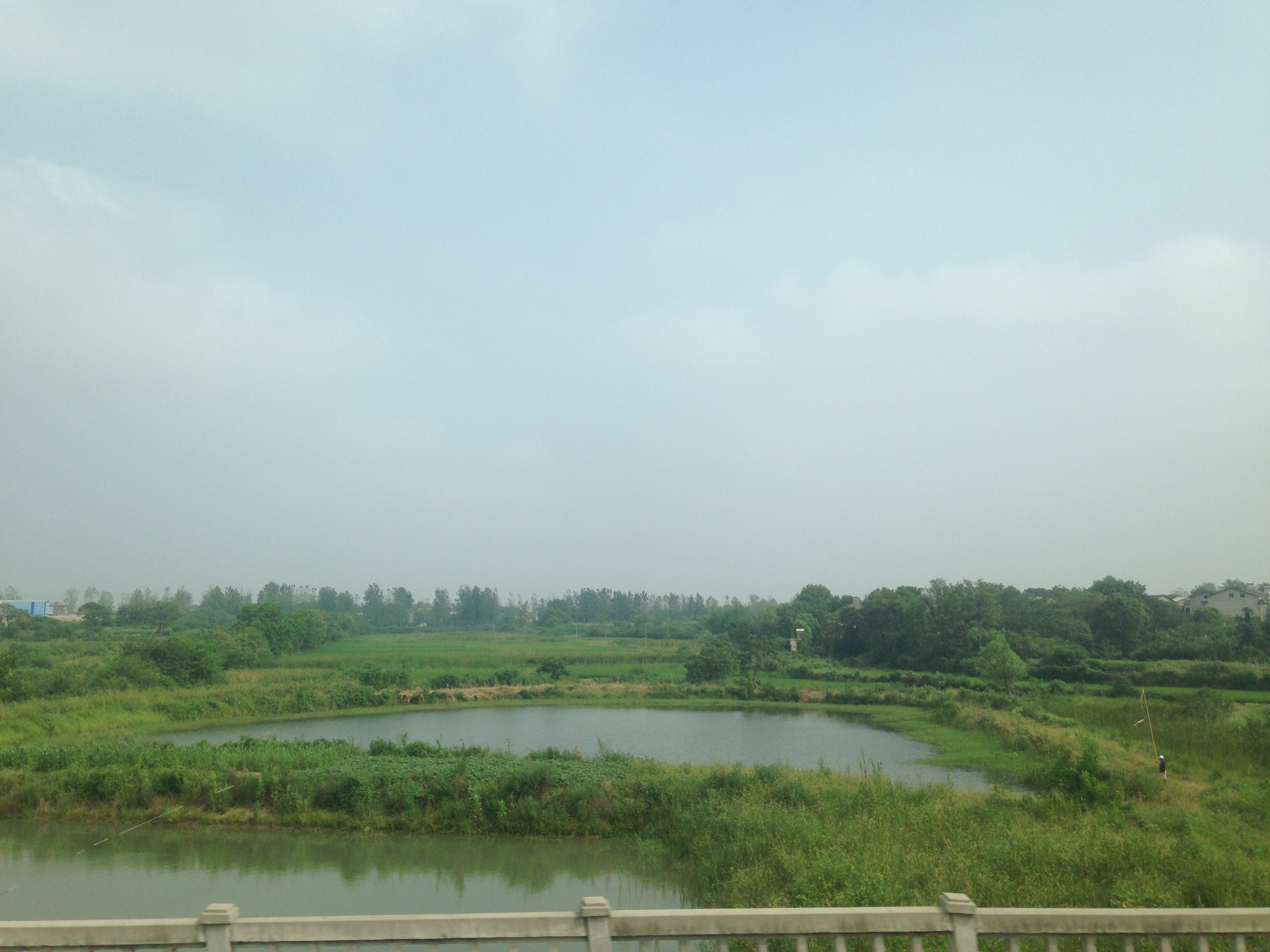
View near Huarong Town, Huarong

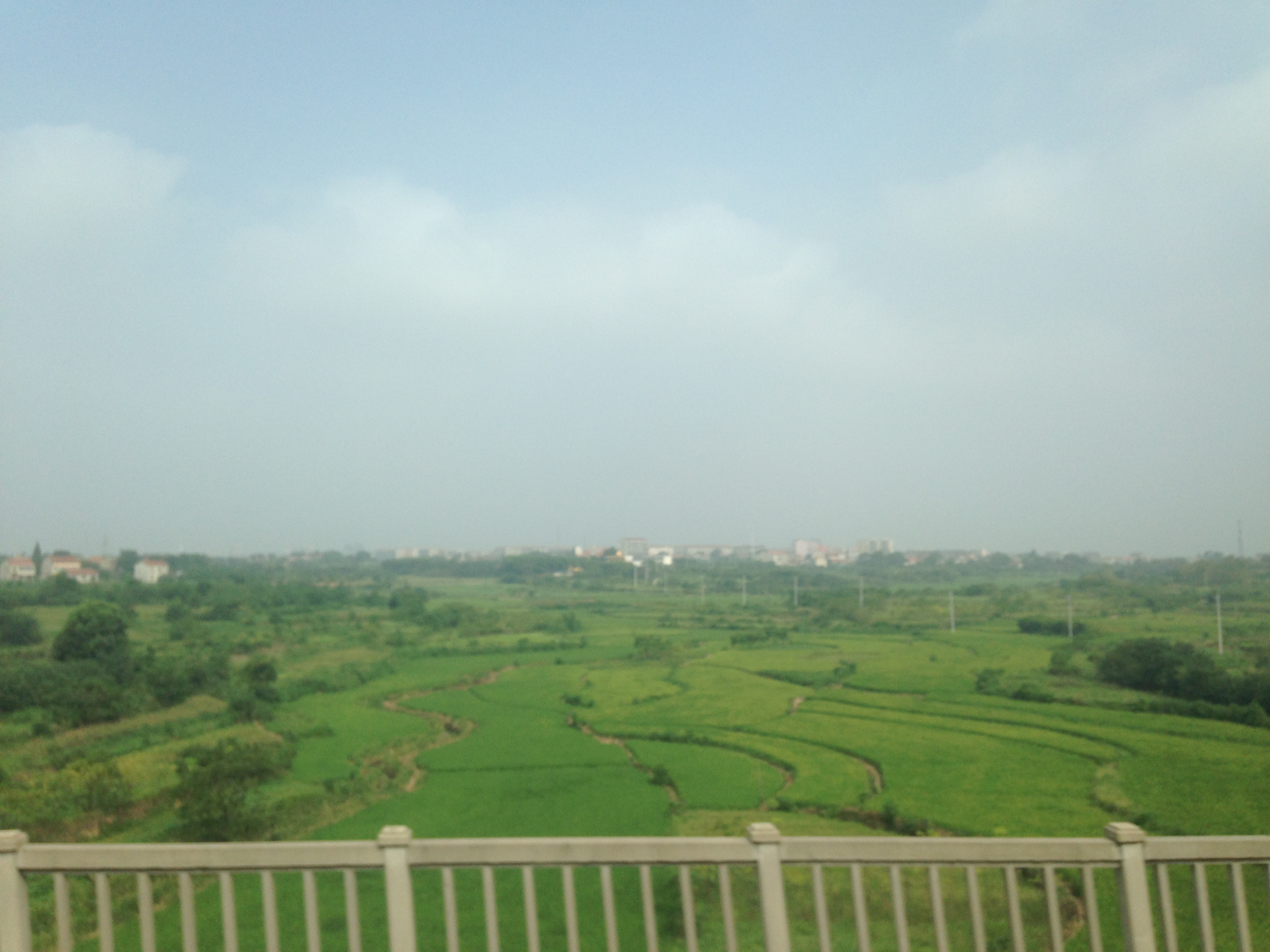
View near Huarong Town, Huarong

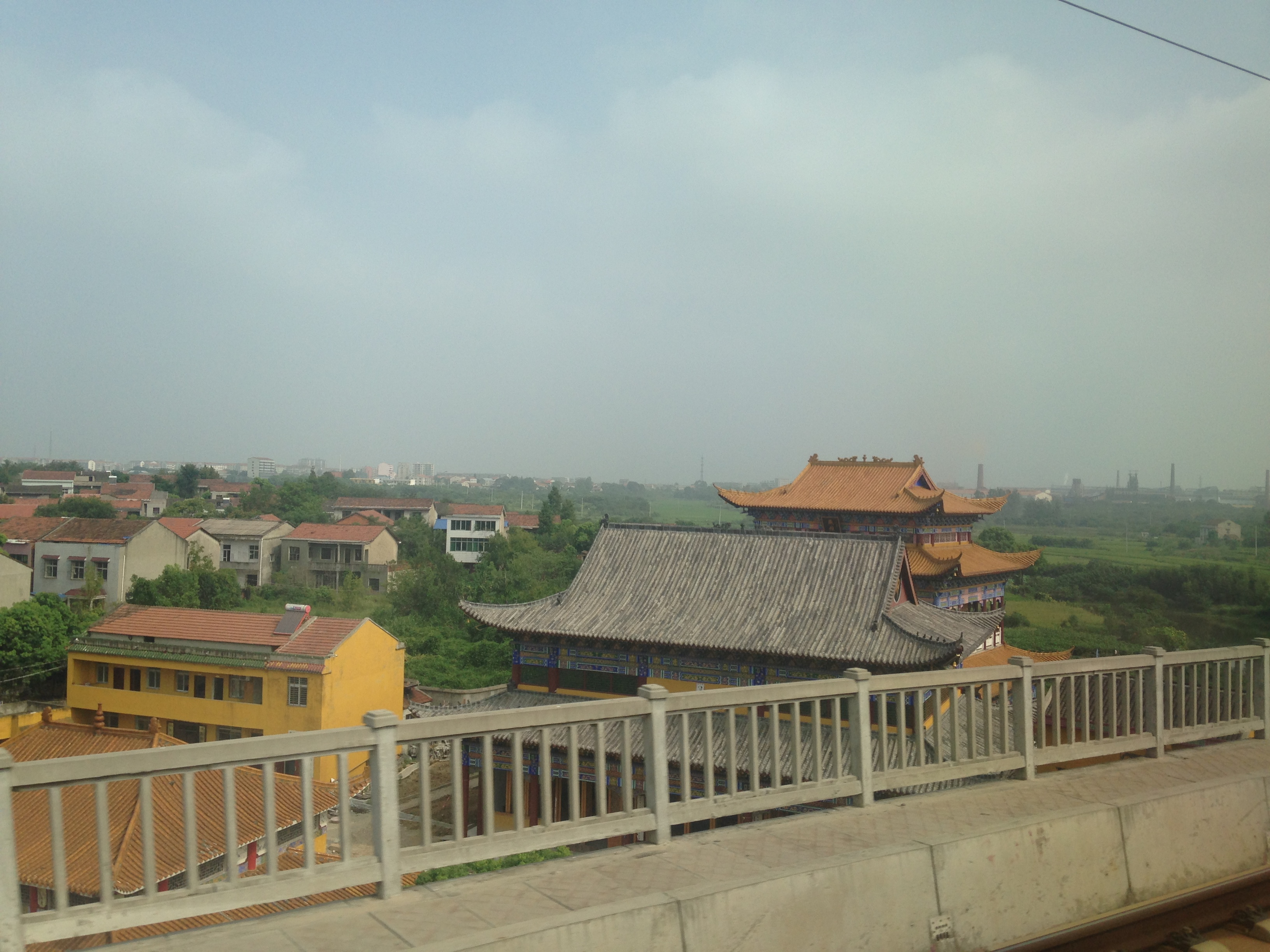
View near Huarong Town, Huarong

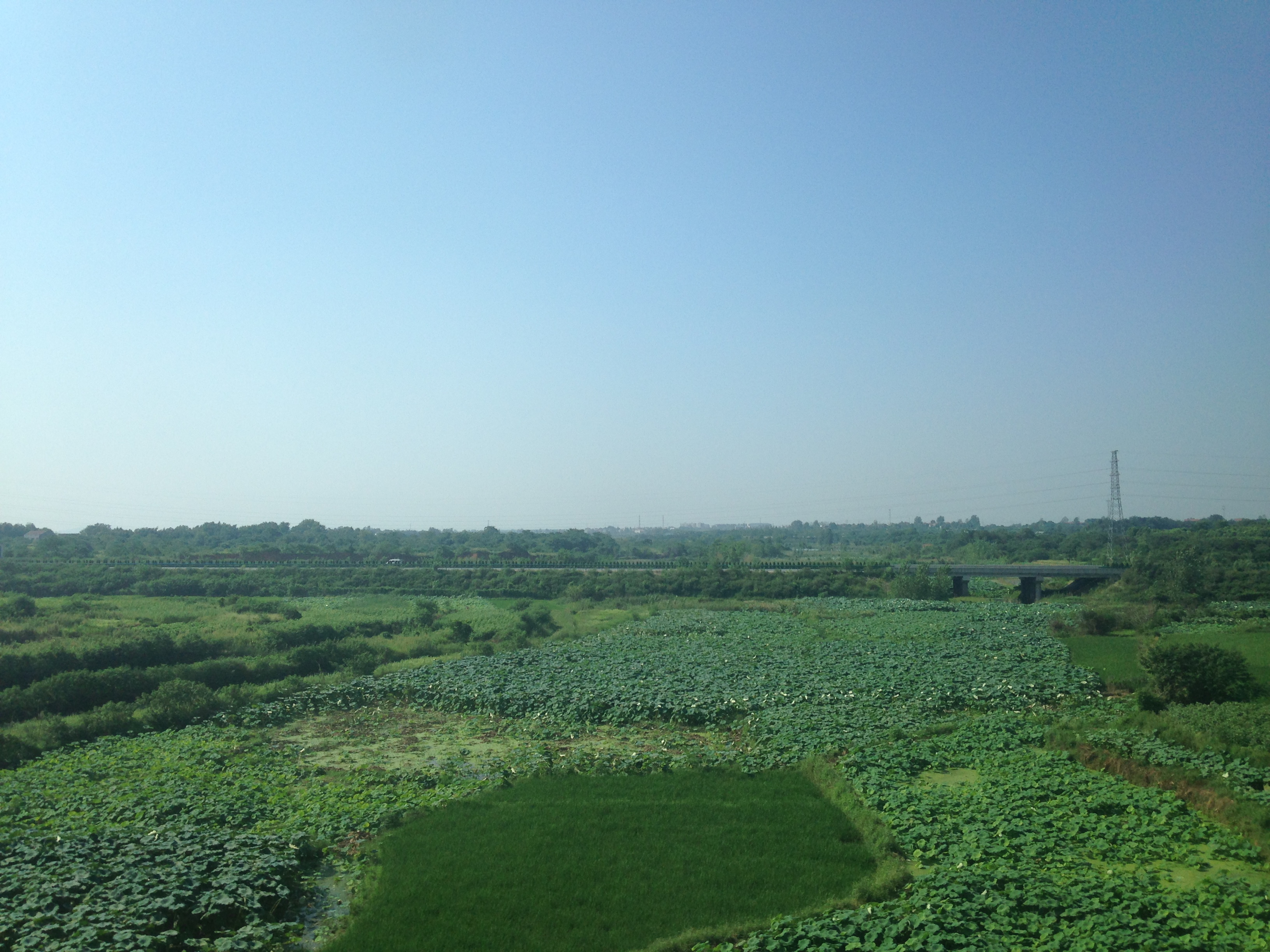
View near Duandian Town, Huarong
