= Cheng Shicai =

Chinese military general

- 程世才
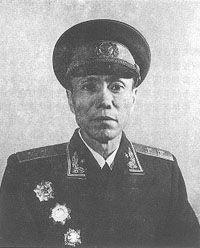
- Born: August 8, 1912; Xuanhuadian, Dawu County, Republic of China
- Died: 15 November 1990 (aged 78); Beijing, People’s Republic of China
- Military career
- Allegiance: Communist China; Republic of China; China
- Branch: Chinese Red Army; People's Liberation Army
- Rank: lieutenant general
- Conflicts: Chinese Civil War; Second Sino-Japanese War

Cheng Shicai (Chinese: 程世才) (August 8, 1912 – November 15, 1990) was a People's Liberation Army lieutenant general. He was born in Xingchong village (杏冲村), Xuanhuadian, Dawu County, Hubei. Cheng joined the Chinese Red Army (predecessor of the People's Liberation Army) in 1930, and the Chinese Communist Party later in the same year.

He graduated from the Counter-Japanese Military and Political University (1938), the Central Party School (1944) and (after the founding of the People's Republic of China) the Advanced Course of the Nanjing Military Academy of the PLA (1951).

A veteran of both the Second Sino-Japanese War and the Chinese Civil War, he served as commander of the Andong Province Military District and participated in the Liaoshen Campaign. In April 1949, he was made commander of the Liaoxi Province Military District.

After the Communist victory in the Civil War and the establishment of the People's Republic of China, he served as deputy commander of the People's Public Security Forces (1950–1957), commander of the Shenyang city garrison (1957–1959), and, most notably, deputy commander of the PLA Armored Forces for 23 years (1959–1982).

He did not appear in public from 1966 to 1974 because of the Cultural Revolution.

He was a member of the 5th Standing Committee of the National People's Congress and of the Central Advisory Commission from September 1982. He died on 15 November 1990.
