= Liuji, Xiaogan =

Liuji 刘集镇
- Town
- Location in Hubei
- Coordinates: 31°21′53″N 114°23′03″E
- Country: People's Republic of China
- Province: Hubei
- Prefecture-level city: Xiaogan
- County: Dawu
- Elevation: 52 m (171 ft)
- Time zone: UTC+8 (China Standard)

Liuji (simplified Chinese: 刘集; traditional Chinese: 劉集; pinyin: Liújí) is a town of Dawu County in northeastern Hubei province, China, located 33 kilometres (21 mi) southeast of the county seat.

== Administrative Divisions ==
As of 2016, Liuji had one residential community and (社区) and 15 villages under its administration. The following list is an approximate rendering of the names of the village-level divisions of Liuji into a romanized form derived from Standard Mandarin pinyin:

One community:

- Liuji (刘集街道居委会)

Fifteen villages:

- Jinhe (金河村), Jingu (金鼓村), Dading (大顶村), Kuaigang (or Huigang) (会岗村), Tiezhai (铁寨村), Heshan (合山村), Diangang (店岗村), Liuji (刘集村), Lanchong (兰冲村) (including Shangtouhe (上头河)), Magang (马岗村), Shahe (沙河村), Wangsi (汪寺村), Changchong (长冲村), Jianshe (建设村), and Liupeng (刘棚村).

== See also ==
- List of township-level divisions of Hubei
