= Sheshui =

She River Sheshui
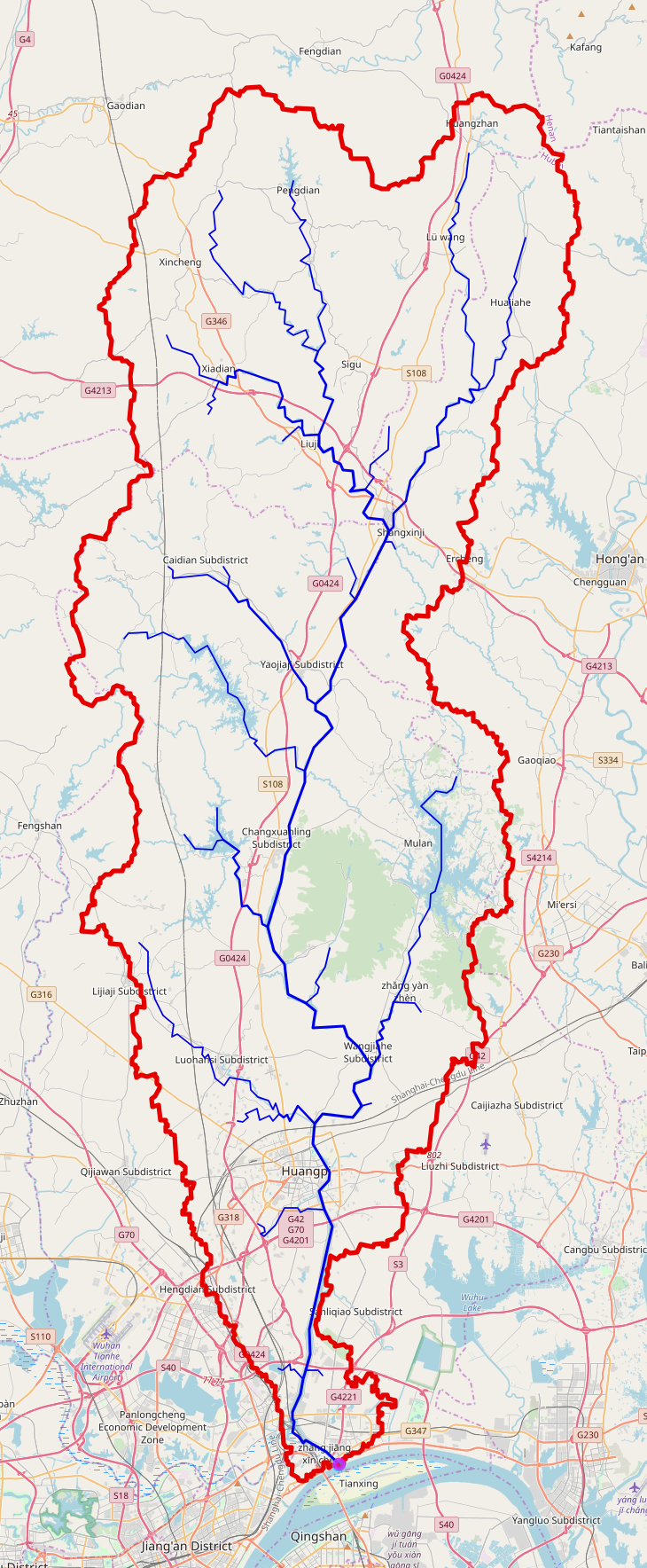
- She river basin
- Native name: 滠水

Location
- Country: China
- Region: Hubei
- District: Wuhan
- Cities: Dawu County, Hubei, Xiaogan, Huanggang, Wuhan

Physical characteristics
- Source: Mount Sanjiao ('Triangle Mountain')
  - location: Dawu County, border area of Hubei and Henan
- Mouth: Yangtze River
  - location: Wuhan, Hubei
  - coordinates: 30°40′N 114°22′E
- Length: 112 km (70 mi), North-south
- Basin size: 2,312 km^{2} (893 sq mi)

Basin features
- River system: Yangtze River basin

Sheshui
- Traditional Chinese: 灄水
- Simplified Chinese: 滠水
- Literal meaning: She River
Transcriptions
Standard Mandarin
- Hanyu Pinyin: Shèshuǐ

The She River (She pronounced like "shuh"), also known by its Chinese name Sheshui, is a left tributary of the Yangtze in central China. It has a length of 112 km. The route of the She River was noted in the Commentary on the Water Classic.

It is the namesake of Shekou in Huangpi District, Wuhan. Shekouxincheng Station is located near the mouth of the She River.

== Geography ==
The headwaters of the She River flow from Mount Sanjiao ('Triangle Mountain') in Dawu County, Hubei in Xiaogan. The river then travels east across Hong'an County in Huanggang, then entering the Huangpi District of Wuhan. Its watershed area is roughly rectangular in shape. On the lower reaches of the She River, there are several archaeological sites including the Masai archaeological site dating from the Warring States period, the Chengmentan archaeological site (New Stone Age), and the Sangujing archaeological site.

== Warm Winter on the She River ==
The Warm Winter on the She River (滠水冬温) is one of the ten important aspects of Huangpi District, as recognized from the Qing dynasty.

Huanglong, one of the Eight Immortals was named Qi Tianlong, and married Ho Xiangu. They lived on a boat, and often helped others. One year, the rain came down in torrents, the mountains burst, the fertile fields flooded, and the animals were slaughtered. Qi Tianlong and his wife rescued many villagers from the calamities. But the two of them became very tired, and were swept away by the floodwaters. Their bodies were found in the county in the north, and the couple were buried on the banks of the She River. In honor of the couple who saved their lives, the villagers built the Xianyou Tai and Xian You cave in front of the couple's tomb, dedicated to their memory. This touched the Eight Immortals, and every winter solstice after the couple's death, the group gathered here and give a wine libation as a sacrifice.
