= Dawu County, Hubei =

Dawu County 大悟县
- County
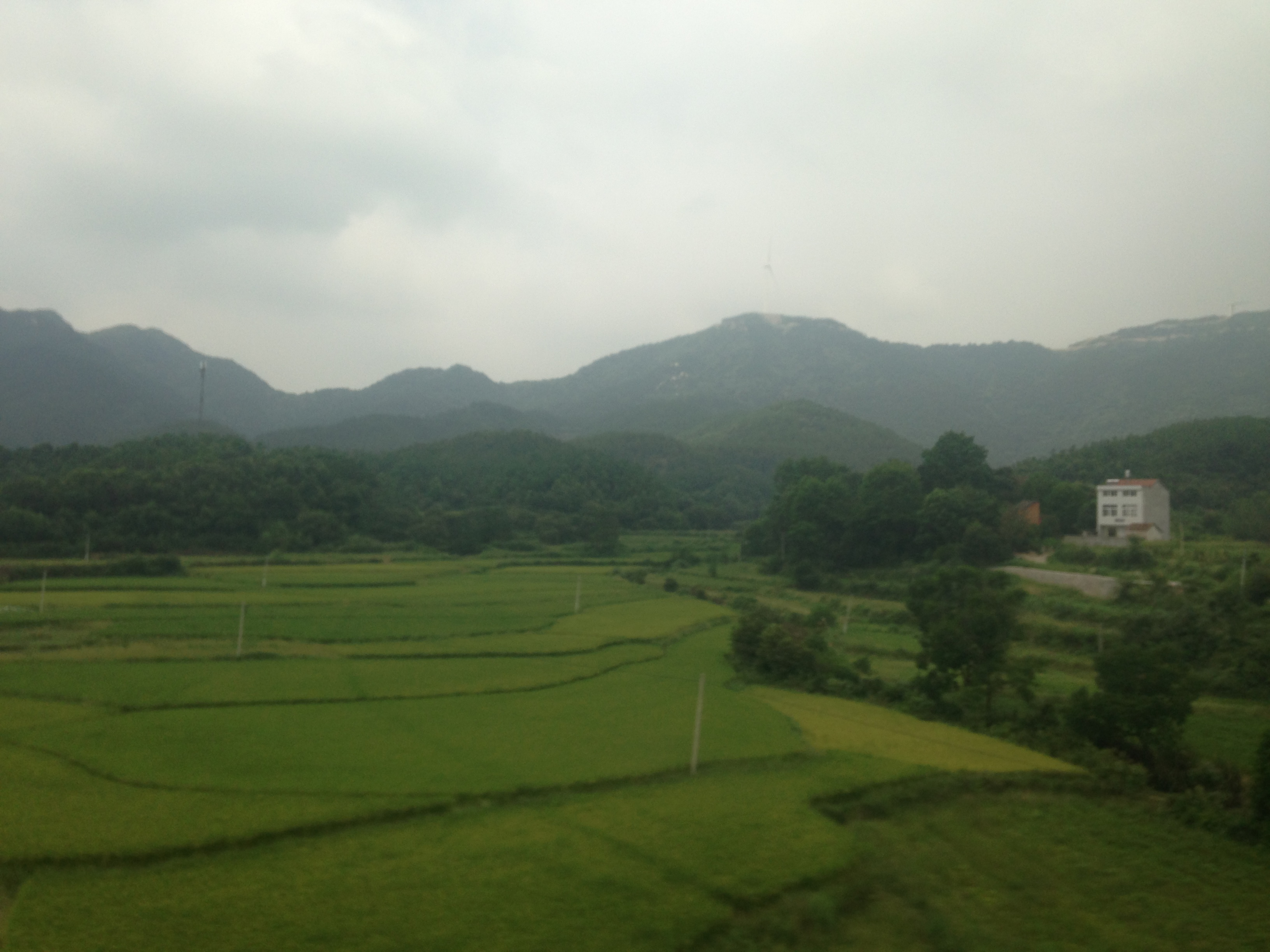
- View near Xiadian, Dawu County

- Location of the seat in Hubei
- Coordinates: 31°37′N 114°19′E
- Country: People's Republic of China
- Province: Hubei
- Prefecture-level city: Xiaogan

Area
  - Total: 1,980 km^{2} (760 sq mi)

Population (2020)
  - Total: 486,153
  - Density: 246/km^{2} (636/sq mi)
- Time zone: UTC+8 (China Standard)
- Postal code: 432800
- Website: www.hbdawu.gov.cn

Dawu County (simplified Chinese: 大悟县; traditional Chinese: 大悟縣; pinyin: Dàwù Xiàn) is a county of northeastern Hubei, People's Republic of China, bordering the prefecture-level city of Xinyang in Henan province to the north. It is under the administration of Xiaogan City.

== Administrative divisions ==
Dawu County comprises 19 township-level divisions including 14 towns, 3 townships and 2 other areas.

Towns:

- Chengguan (城关镇), Yangping (阳平镇), Fangfan (芳畈镇), Xincheng (新城镇), Xiadian (夏店镇), Liuji (刘集镇), Hekou (河口镇), Sigu (四姑镇), Lüwang (吕王镇), Huangzhan (黄站镇), Xuanhuadian (宣化店镇), Fengdian (丰店镇), Daxin (大新镇), Sanli (三里镇)

Townships:

- Gaodian Township (高店乡), Pengdian Township (彭店乡), Dongxin Township (东新乡)

Other areas:

- Economic Development District (经济开发区), High speed Railway New Area (高铁新区)

== Climate ==
Climate data for Dawu, elevation 120 m (390 ft), (1991–2020 normals, extremes 1981–2010)
Month	Jan	Feb	Mar	Apr	May	Jun	Jul	Aug	Sep	Oct	Nov	Dec	Year
Record high °C (°F)	20.0 (68.0)	27.2 (81.0)	30.7 (87.3)	33.8 (92.8)	37.3 (99.1)	37.9 (100.2)	39.4 (102.9)	39.3 (102.7)	37.7 (99.9)	34.1 (93.4)	29.2 (84.6)	22.6 (72.7)	39.4 (102.9)
Mean daily maximum °C (°F)	7.7 (45.9)	10.8 (51.4)	16.0 (60.8)	22.5 (72.5)	27.1 (80.8)	30.2 (86.4)	32.3 (90.1)	31.8 (89.2)	27.5 (81.5)	22.4 (72.3)	16.0 (60.8)	10.1 (50.2)	21.2 (70.2)
Daily mean °C (°F)	2.8 (37.0)	5.6 (42.1)	10.6 (51.1)	16.8 (62.2)	21.7 (71.1)	25.4 (77.7)	28.0 (82.4)	26.8 (80.2)	22.4 (72.3)	17.1 (62.8)	10.9 (51.6)	4.9 (40.8)	16.1 (60.9)
Mean daily minimum °C (°F)	−0.6 (30.9)	1.8 (35.2)	6.3 (43.3)	12.0 (53.6)	17.2 (63.0)	21.5 (70.7)	24.6 (76.3)	23.2 (73.8)	18.8 (65.8)	13.4 (56.1)	7.2 (45.0)	1.1 (34.0)	12.2 (54.0)
Record low °C (°F)	−11.3 (11.7)	−9.2 (15.4)	−4.1 (24.6)	−0.3 (31.5)	6.0 (42.8)	11.3 (52.3)	18.1 (64.6)	14.6 (58.3)	9.5 (49.1)	0.2 (32.4)	−5.4 (22.3)	−14.2 (6.4)	−14.2 (6.4)
Average precipitation mm (inches)	29.4 (1.16)	41.1 (1.62)	60.6 (2.39)	91.5 (3.60)	124.4 (4.90)	173.2 (6.82)	246.6 (9.71)	160.3 (6.31)	95.5 (3.76)	82.1 (3.23)	47.2 (1.86)	20 (0.8)	1,171.9 (46.16)
Average precipitation days (≥ 0.1 mm)	6.9	8.6	9.7	9.8	11.1	10.7	11.5	10.8	8.0	8.7	7.7	6.2	109.7
Average snowy days	4.7	3.3	1.0	0	0	0	0	0	0	0	0.7	2.1	11.8
Average relative humidity (%)	72	72	71	71	73	78	81	80	78	77	76	70	75
Mean monthly sunshine hours	113.0	109.7	147.1	172.7	180.4	173.2	204.0	209.3	168.5	157.5	142.2	126.8	1,904.4
Percentage possible sunshine	35	35	39	44	42	41	47	51	46	45	45	41	43
Source: China Meteorological Administration

== Notable people from Dawu County ==
- Cheng Shicai
