= Huangpi, Wuhan =

Huangpi 黄陂区
- District
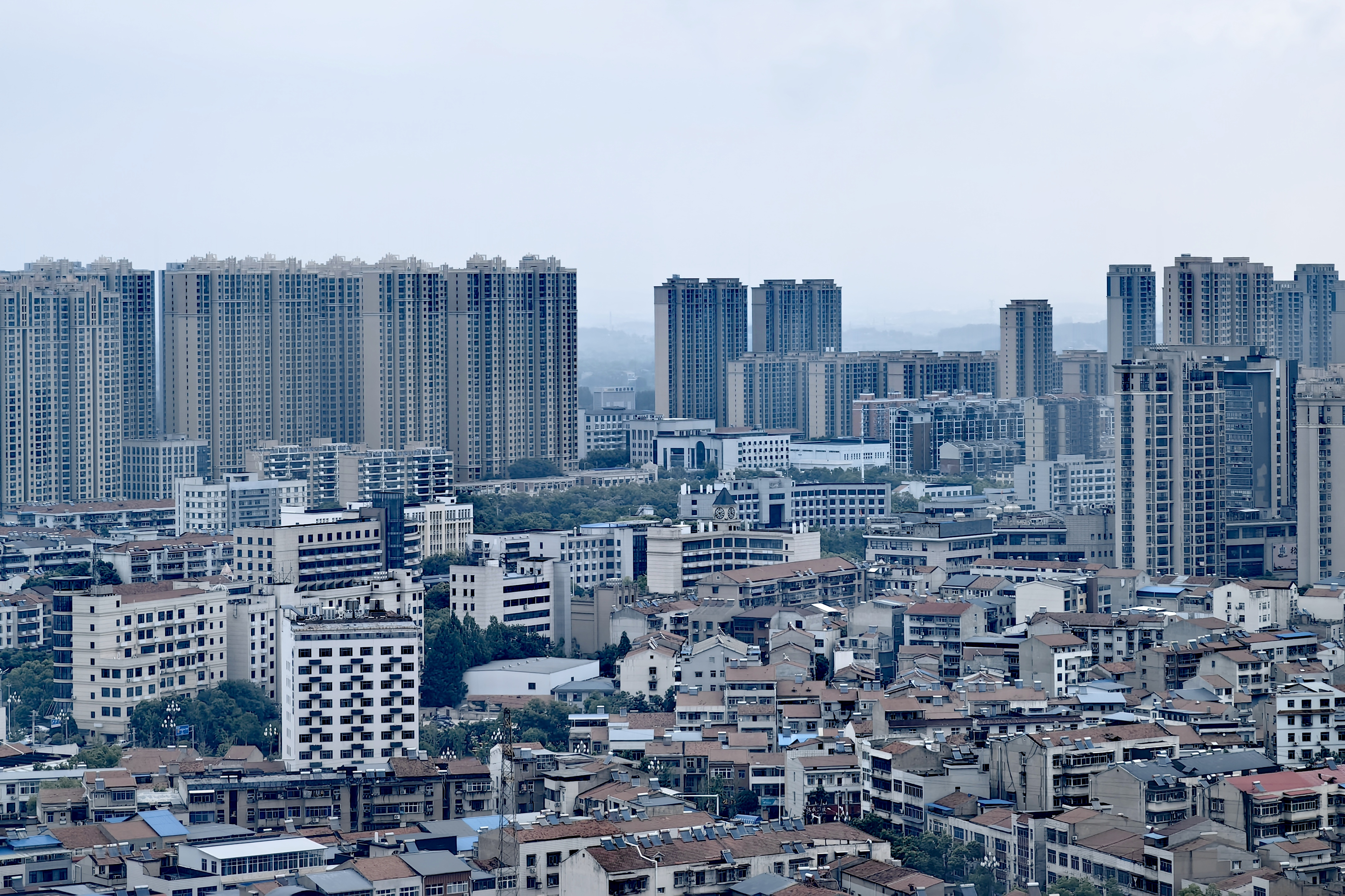
- Huangpi Skyline
- Interactive map of Huangpi
- Location in Hubei
- Coordinates: 30°52′30″N 114°22′30″E
- Country: People's Republic of China
- Province: Hubei
- Sub-provincial city: Wuhan

Area
  - Total: 2,261.00 km^{2} (872.98 sq mi)

Population (2020 census)
  - Total: 1,151,644
  - Density: 509.352/km^{2} (1,319.21/sq mi)
- Time zone: UTC+8 (China Standard)
- Postal code: 4303XX
- Website: http://www.huangpi.gov.cn/

Huangpi District (Chinese: 黄陂区; pinyin: Huángpí Qū) is one of 13 urban districts of the prefecture-level city of Wuhan, the capital of Hubei Province, China, situated on the northern (left) bank of the Yangtze River. The Sheshui enters the Yangtze at Huangpi. The district is primarily rural, but also includes important infrastructure facilities, such as Wuhan Tianhe International Airport and Wuhan North Railway Station, which is one of the main freight stations and classification yards on the Beijing–Guangzhou Railway. It is the northernmost of Wuhan's districts as well as the most spacious. On the left bank of the Yangtze, it borders the districts of Xinzhou to the east, and Jiang'an to the south, and Dongxihu to the southwest; on the opposite bank, it borders Hongshan. It also borders the prefecture-level cities of Huanggang to the northeast and Xiaogan to the northwest. The Sheshui (She River) enters the Yangtze River at Shekou in Huangpi.

The use of the character pi (陂) in Huangpi is cited in the Contemporary Chinese Dictionary as an example of usage of this infrequently encountered pronunciation for the character.

The Wuhan–Xiaogan Intercity Railway, one of the lines of the Wuhan Metropolitan Area Intercity Railway, serves parts of Huangpi District, in particular Wuhan Tianhe Airport. The rail line opened on December 1, 2016.

== History ==
In 845 BC Marquis Wen (文侯) Huang Meng (黃孟, aka Huang Zhang (黃璋)) moved the capital of the State of Huang from Yicheng to Huangchuan (present-day Huangchuan, Henan). Huang Xi's descendants ruled State of Huang until 648 BC when it was destroyed by the State of Chu. The Marquis of Huang, Marquis Mu (穆侯) Huang Qisheng (黃企生), fled to the state of Qi. The people of Huang were forced to relocate to Chu. They settled in the region of present-day Hubei province, in a region known as the Jiangxia Prefecture (江夏郡) during the Han dynasty (206 BC-AD 220). There are many places in this region today that were named after Huang e.g. Huanggang, Huangpi, Huangmei, Huangshi, Huangan, Huangzhou etc. A large number of the people of Huang were also relocated to regions south of the Yangtze River.

== Geography ==
=== Administrative divisions ===
Huangpi District administers:

Name	Chinese (S)
Qianchuan Subdistrict	前川街道
Qijiawan Subdistrict	祁家湾街道
Hengdian Subdistrict	横店街道
Luohan Subdistrict	罗汉街道
Shekou Subdistrict (She-k'ou)	滠口街道
Liuzhi Subdistrict	六指街道
Tianhe Subdistrict	天河街道
Wangjiahe Subdistrict	王家河街道
Changxuanling Subdistrict	长轩岭街道
Lijiaji Subdistrict	李家集街道
Yaojiaji Subdistrict	姚家集街道
Caijiazha Subdistrict	蔡家榨街道
Wuhu Farm	武湖农场
Sanliqiao Subdistrict	三里桥街道
Caidian Subdistrict	蔡店街道
Mulan Township	木兰乡

== Climate ==
Climate data for Huangpi District, elevation 31 m (102 ft), (1991–2020 normals)
Month	Jan	Feb	Mar	Apr	May	Jun	Jul	Aug	Sep	Oct	Nov	Dec	Year
Mean daily maximum °C (°F)	8.0 (46.4)	11.1 (52.0)	15.9 (60.6)	22.2 (72.0)	26.9 (80.4)	29.8 (85.6)	32.6 (90.7)	32.6 (90.7)	28.7 (83.7)	23.2 (73.8)	16.9 (62.4)	10.5 (50.9)	21.5 (70.8)
Daily mean °C (°F)	3.7 (38.7)	6.5 (43.7)	11.1 (52.0)	17.2 (63.0)	22.2 (72.0)	25.6 (78.1)	28.5 (83.3)	28 (82)	23.7 (74.7)	17.8 (64.0)	11.5 (52.7)	5.7 (42.3)	16.8 (62.2)
Mean daily minimum °C (°F)	0.4 (32.7)	2.9 (37.2)	7.1 (44.8)	12.9 (55.2)	18.1 (64.6)	22.2 (72.0)	25.1 (77.2)	24.5 (76.1)	20.0 (68.0)	13.8 (56.8)	7.5 (45.5)	2.1 (35.8)	13.1 (55.5)
Average precipitation mm (inches)	45.5 (1.79)	56.6 (2.23)	84.3 (3.32)	123.7 (4.87)	144.9 (5.70)	208.7 (8.22)	248.8 (9.80)	104.6 (4.12)	73.1 (2.88)	60.2 (2.37)	53.4 (2.10)	28.0 (1.10)	1,231.8 (48.5)
Average precipitation days (≥ 0.1 mm)	9.1	9.5	12.4	10.9	11.8	11.9	11.1	9.5	7.8	9.0	8.8	6.9	118.7
Average snowy days	4.3	2.2	1.0	0	0	0	0	0	0	0	0.4	1.1	9
Average relative humidity (%)	75	75	76	76	78	83	83	81	78	77	77	74	78
Mean monthly sunshine hours	108.7	106.1	131.9	158.6	170.9	161.9	206.8	219.2	174.7	158.2	140.9	128.0	1,865.9
Percentage possible sunshine	34	34	35	41	40	38	48	54	48	45	45	41	42
Source: China Meteorological Administration

== See also ==
- Yuanjisi Reservoir
