= Tuanfeng County =

Tuanfeng County 团风县 Twanfeng
- County
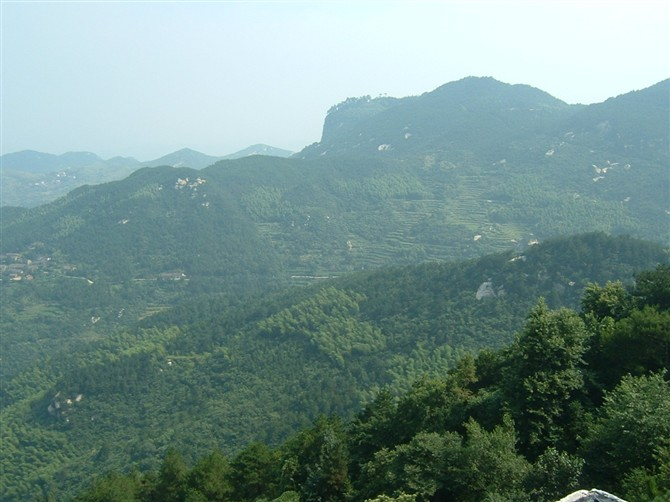
- Mount Daqishan

- Location in Hubei
- Coordinates (Tuanfeng government): 30°38′37″N 114°52′20″E
- Country: People's Republic of China
- Province: Hubei
- Prefecture-level city: Huanggang

Area
  - Total: 838.4 km^{2} (323.7 sq mi)

Population (2020)
  - Total: 266,218
  - Density: 317.5/km^{2} (822.4/sq mi)
- Time zone: UTC+8 (China Standard)
- Website: 团风县人民政府门户网站 (Tuanfeng County People's Government Web Portal) (in Simplified Chinese)

Tuanfeng County (simplified Chinese: 团风县; traditional Chinese: 團風縣; pinyin: Tuánfēng Xiàn) is a county under the administration of the prefecture-level city of Huanggang, in the east of Hubei province, situated on the north (left) bank of the Yangtze River. There is a famous high school, named Tuanfeng High School. It provides many good students to universities all over China.

The local economy is agricultural, with cotton, wheat and rice being the primary crops. There is little industry in the area.

As of the 2000 census, the county had a population of 380,000. The population had declined to 266,000 in 2020.

== Geography ==
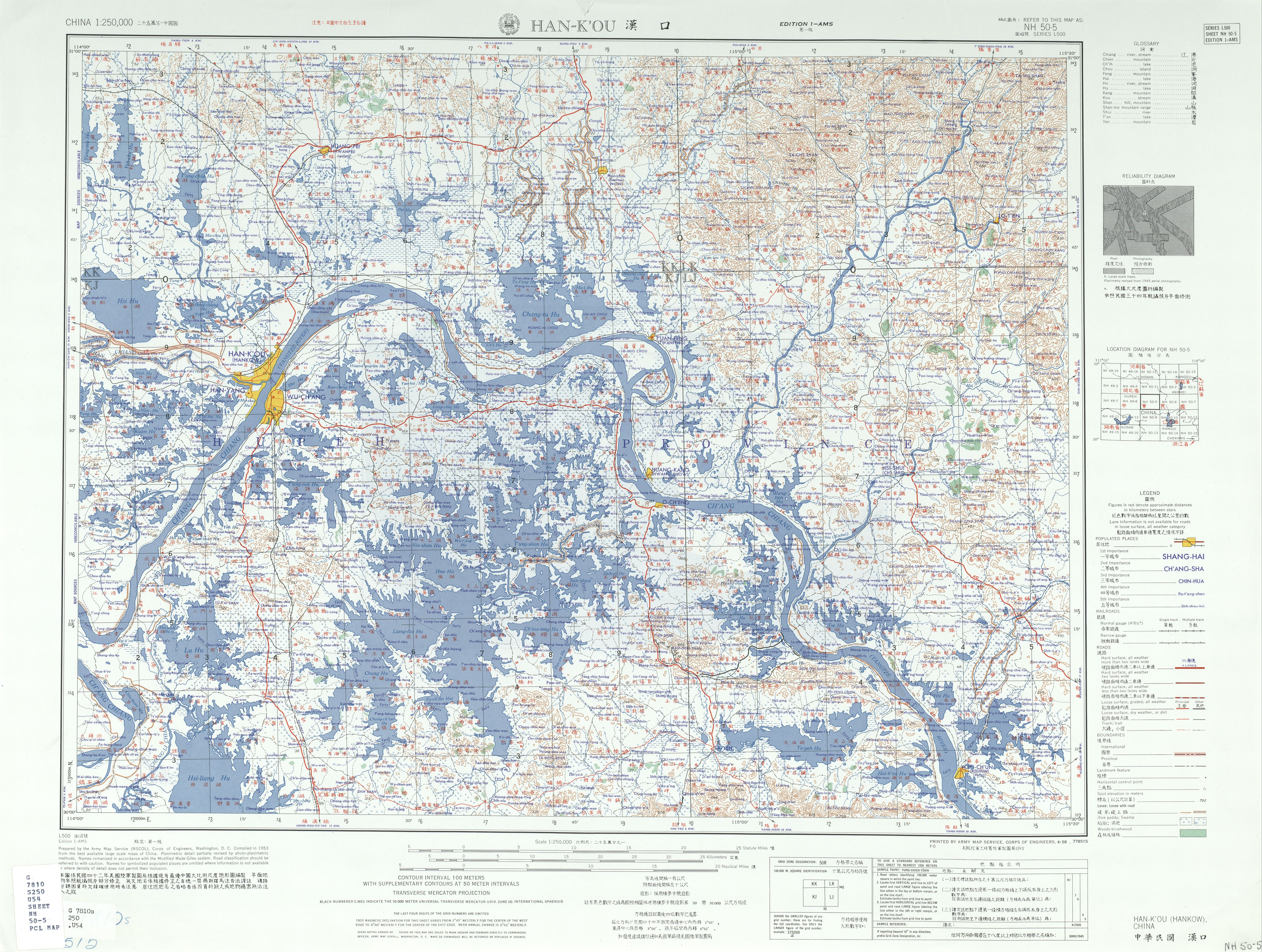
Map including Tuanfeng (labeled as T'UAN-FENG (TWANFENG) 團風) (1953)

== Demographics ==
According to the 2020 census, the permanent population of Tuanfeng County is 266,218, down from 338,609 in the 2010 census. The population is largely rural, with many residents engaged in agricultural activities.

== Economy ==
The local economy relies primarily on agriculture, with cotton, wheat, and rice being the principal crops. While the county has limited industrial development, it reported a government revenue of 781 million RMB in 2023, up from 608.17 million in 2022.

== Education ==
Tuanfeng High School is a key educational institution in the county, known for preparing students for entrance into top Chinese universities.

=== Administrative divisions ===
Tuanfeng County administers eight towns and two townships:

#	Name	Chinese (S)
Towns
1	Tuanfeng	团风镇
2	Linshanhe (Lin-shan-ho)	淋山河镇
3	Fanggaoping	方高坪镇
4	Huilongshan	回龙山镇
5	Macaodian	马曹庙镇
6	Shangbahe	上巴河镇
7	Zongluzui Town	总路咀镇 (总路嘴镇)
8	Dandian	但店镇
Townships
9	Gu/Jiamiao	贾庙乡
10	Dupi	杜皮乡

== Climate ==
Climate data for Tuanfeng, elevation 28 m (92 ft), (1991–2020 normals, extremes 1991–present)
Month	Jan	Feb	Mar	Apr	May	Jun	Jul	Aug	Sep	Oct	Nov	Dec	Year
Record high °C (°F)	24.6 (76.3)	27.7 (81.9)	31.1 (88.0)	34.7 (94.5)	36.8 (98.2)	38.2 (100.8)	39.1 (102.4)	40.6 (105.1)	37.9 (100.2)	35.2 (95.4)	28.5 (83.3)	22.7 (72.9)	40.6 (105.1)
Mean daily maximum °C (°F)	8.3 (46.9)	11.4 (52.5)	17.2 (63.0)	22.8 (73.0)	27.5 (81.5)	30.2 (86.4)	33.1 (91.6)	33.5 (92.3)	29.1 (84.4)	23.6 (74.5)	17.2 (63.0)	10.8 (51.4)	22.1 (71.7)
Daily mean °C (°F)	4.3 (39.7)	7.1 (44.8)	12.3 (54.1)	17.8 (64.0)	22.8 (73.0)	26.0 (78.8)	28.9 (84.0)	28.7 (83.7)	24.3 (75.7)	18.7 (65.7)	12.3 (54.1)	6.3 (43.3)	17.5 (63.4)
Mean daily minimum °C (°F)	1.5 (34.7)	4.0 (39.2)	8.7 (47.7)	13.8 (56.8)	19.0 (66.2)	22.8 (73.0)	25.7 (78.3)	25.4 (77.7)	20.9 (69.6)	15.2 (59.4)	8.9 (48.0)	3.1 (37.6)	14.1 (57.4)
Record low °C (°F)	−7.5 (18.5)	−6.5 (20.3)	−2.0 (28.4)	4.3 (39.7)	9.8 (49.6)	15.9 (60.6)	18.8 (65.8)	17.1 (62.8)	12.2 (54.0)	6.0 (42.8)	−2.1 (28.2)	−6.2 (20.8)	−7.5 (18.5)
Average precipitation mm (inches)	45.1 (1.78)	74.4 (2.93)	93.5 (3.68)	135.1 (5.32)	176.8 (6.96)	196.5 (7.74)	240.3 (9.46)	85.8 (3.38)	84.9 (3.34)	71.1 (2.80)	61.4 (2.42)	26.0 (1.02)	1,290.9 (50.83)
Average precipitation days (≥ 0.1 mm)	9.7	10.8	12.7	10.9	11.9	12.1	11.5	9.7	8.1	9.3	9.5	6.9	123.1
Average snowy days	3.1	1.8	0.2	0	0	0	0	0	0	0	0.1	1.0	6.2
Average relative humidity (%)	76	76	74	73	75	80	80	79	77	76	77	72	76
Mean monthly sunshine hours	94.3	98.8	138.2	161.3	165.4	161.3	216.4	234.8	170.5	162.4	140.3	126.4	1,870.1
Percentage possible sunshine	29	31	37	42	39	38	51	58	47	46	45	40	42
Source: China Meteorological Administrationall-time extreme temperatureall-time May low
