= Xiaogan =

Xiaogan 孝感市 Siaokan
- Prefecture-level city
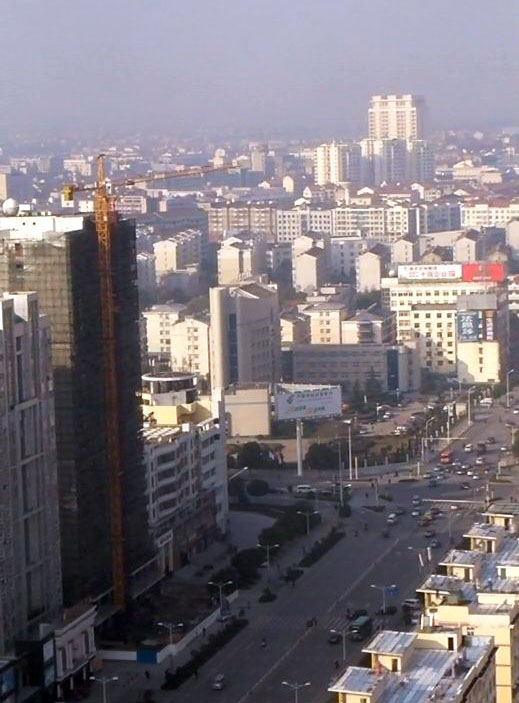
- view west towards city's south central area

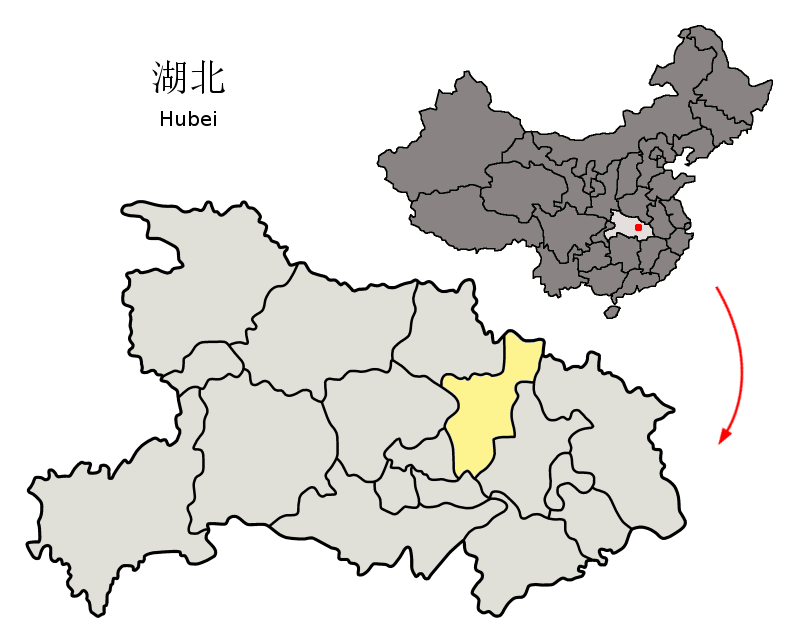
- Location of Xiaogan City in Hubei and the PRC

- Location of the city centre in Hubei
- Coordinates (Xiaogan municipal government): 30°55′05″N 113°57′25″E
- Country: People's Republic of China
- Province: Hubei
- Municipal seat: Xiaonan District

Area
  - Prefecture-level city: 8,922.72 km^{2} (3,445.08 sq mi)
  - Urban: 1,034.8 km^{2} (399.5 sq mi)
  - Metro: 1,034.8 km^{2} (399.5 sq mi)

Population (2020 census)
  - Prefecture-level city: 4,270,371
  - Density: 478.595/km^{2} (1,239.56/sq mi)
  - Urban: 988,479
  - Urban density: 955.24/km^{2} (2,474.1/sq mi)
  - Metro: 988,479
  - Metro density: 955.24/km^{2} (2,474.1/sq mi)

GDP
  - Prefecture-level city: CN¥ 145.7 billion US$ 23.4 billion
  - Per capita: CN¥ 29,924; US$ 4,804
- Time zone: UTC+8 (China Standard)
- Postal code: 432100
- Area code: 712
- ISO 3166 code: CN-HB-09
- Website: www.xiaogan.gov.cn

Xiaogan (Chinese: 孝感; pinyin: Xiàogǎn) is a prefecture-level city in east-central Hubei province, People's Republic of China, some 60 kilometres (37 mi) northwest of the provincial capital of Wuhan. According to the 2020 census, its population totaled 4,270,371, of whom 988,479 lived in the built-up (or metro) area of Xiaonan District.

== Etymology ==
The city name Xiaogan, meaning Filial Piety Moves Tian (Chinese: 孝行感天), originates from the story of Dong Yong, who sold himself for his father's funeral, in The Twenty-four Filial Exemplars.

== History ==
In 1961, the 15th Airborne Corps, renamed the People's Liberation Army Air Force Airborne Corps in April 2017, established its headquarters in Xiaogan. It is an airborne and air assault force.

== Culture ==
On the third day of the third month of the lunar calendar, many in Wuhan eat 'di cai zhu ji dan' (地菜煮鸡蛋) which is supposed to prevent illness in the coming year. This practice is related to a story involving Shennong in Xiaogan.

== Geography ==
The Sheshui River originates in Xiaogan's Dawu County.

== Administrative divisions ==
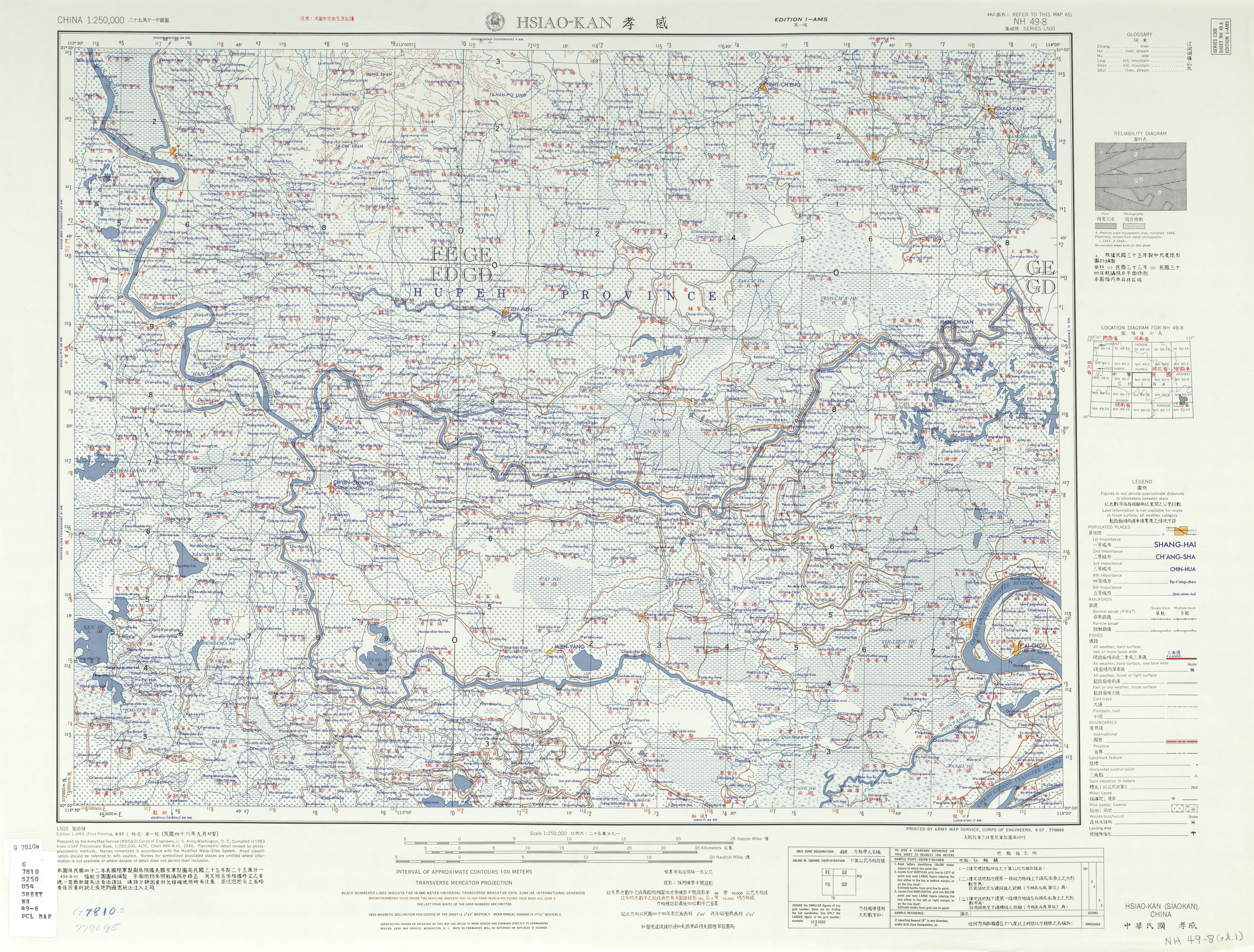
Map of Xiaogan (labeled as HSIAO-KAN (SIAOKAN) 孝感) and nearby areas (1953)

Since 2000, Xiaogan has been divided into 1 district, 3 county-level cities and 3 counties:

- Xiaonan District (孝南区)
- Yingcheng City (应城市)
- Anlu City (安陆市)
- Hanchuan City (汉川市)
- Xiaochang County (孝昌县)
- Dawu County (大悟县)
- Yunmeng County (云梦县)

Map
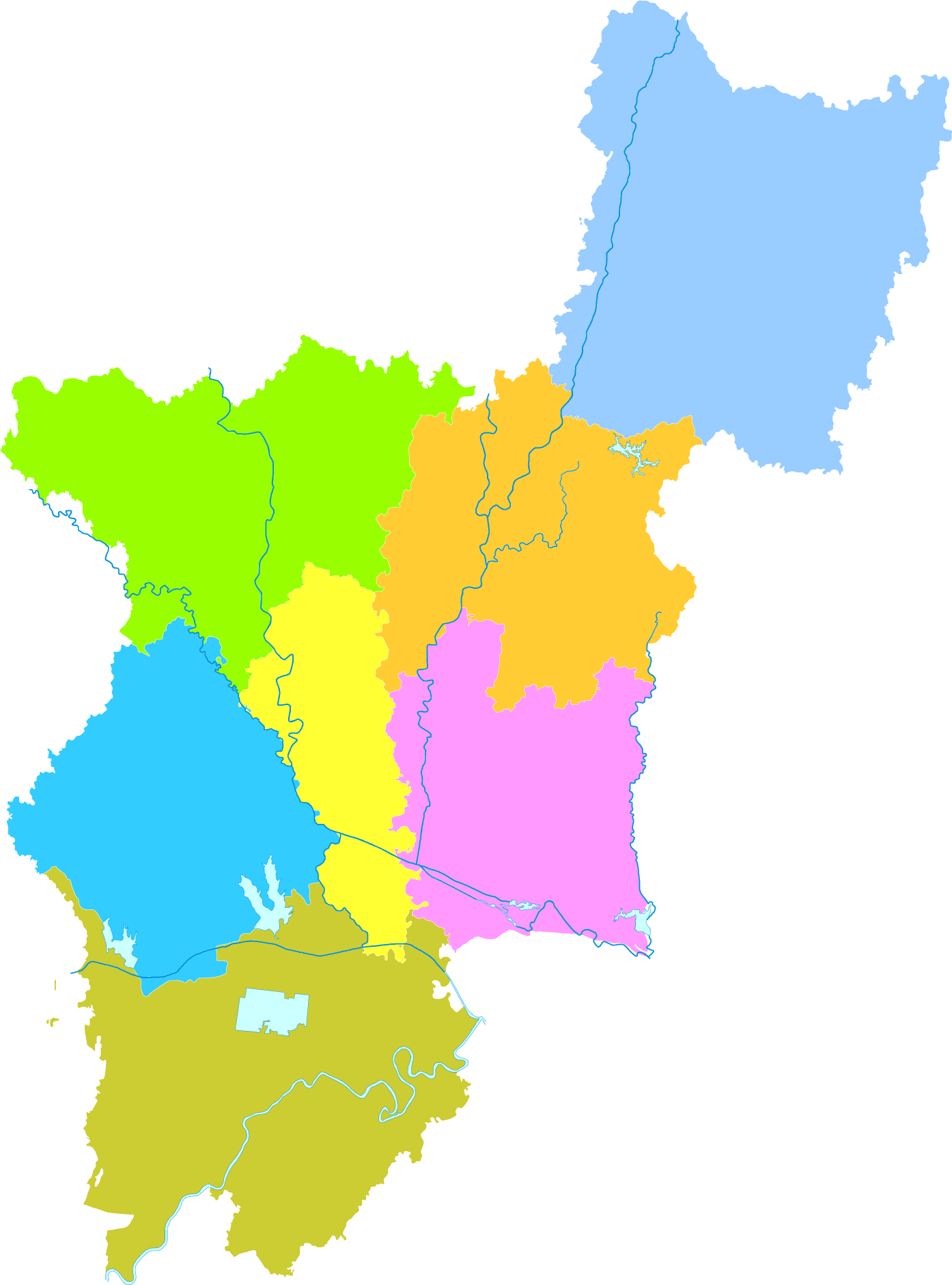

== Climate ==
Climate data for Xiaogan, elevation 26 m (85 ft), (1991–2020 normals, extremes 1981–present)
Month	Jan	Feb	Mar	Apr	May	Jun	Jul	Aug	Sep	Oct	Nov	Dec	Year
Record high °C (°F)	20.6 (69.1)	27.5 (81.5)	33.0 (91.4)	33.8 (92.8)	35.3 (95.5)	37.5 (99.5)	39.4 (102.9)	39.5 (103.1)	38.4 (101.1)	34.0 (93.2)	28.8 (83.8)	21.9 (71.4)	39.5 (103.1)
Mean daily maximum °C (°F)	8.1 (46.6)	11.1 (52.0)	16.0 (60.8)	22.3 (72.1)	27.0 (80.6)	29.9 (85.8)	32.5 (90.5)	32.4 (90.3)	28.7 (83.7)	23.2 (73.8)	16.9 (62.4)	10.6 (51.1)	21.6 (70.8)
Daily mean °C (°F)	3.7 (38.7)	6.5 (43.7)	11.2 (52.2)	17.2 (63.0)	22.2 (72.0)	25.8 (78.4)	28.5 (83.3)	27.9 (82.2)	23.6 (74.5)	17.7 (63.9)	11.4 (52.5)	5.7 (42.3)	16.8 (62.2)
Mean daily minimum °C (°F)	0.5 (32.9)	2.9 (37.2)	7.3 (45.1)	13.0 (55.4)	18.2 (64.8)	22.5 (72.5)	25.4 (77.7)	24.7 (76.5)	19.9 (67.8)	13.8 (56.8)	7.5 (45.5)	2.1 (35.8)	13.2 (55.7)
Record low °C (°F)	−13.7 (7.3)	−7.3 (18.9)	−2.7 (27.1)	0.8 (33.4)	8.3 (46.9)	12.9 (55.2)	18.6 (65.5)	15.9 (60.6)	10.7 (51.3)	1.5 (34.7)	−3.8 (25.2)	−14.9 (5.2)	−14.9 (5.2)
Average precipitation mm (inches)	42.3 (1.67)	52.3 (2.06)	78.5 (3.09)	117.0 (4.61)	144.3 (5.68)	183.0 (7.20)	209.3 (8.24)	113.3 (4.46)	68.3 (2.69)	61.0 (2.40)	47.4 (1.87)	25.6 (1.01)	1,142.3 (44.98)
Average precipitation days (≥ 0.1 mm)	8.5	9.7	11.3	10.6	12.1	11.2	10.8	9.1	7.2	8.9	8.3	6.6	114.3
Average snowy days	3.9	2.3	0.9	0	0	0	0	0	0	0	0.3	1.1	8.5
Average relative humidity (%)	76	76	76	76	77	82	82	80	77	77	77	74	78
Mean monthly sunshine hours	109.0	105.8	134.3	156.5	166.3	153.7	203.8	211.6	167.1	153.2	137.4	127.2	1,825.9
Percentage possible sunshine	34	33	36	40	39	36	47	52	46	44	44	41	41
Source: China Meteorological Administration all-time extreme temperature

== Food ==
- Xiaogan Rice wine (孝感米酒)

== Notable people from Xiaogan ==
- Cheng Shicai
- Liu Zhen

== Sister cities ==
- Brest, Belarus
