= Sanxi =

Sanxi, may refer to the following places:

== Anhui ==
- Sanxi, Jingde County

== Chongqing ==
- Sanxi, Dianjiang County

== Guangdong ==
- Sanxi, Lechang

== Hubei ==
- Sanxi, Yangxin County

== Jiangxi ==
- Sanxi Township, Nanfeng County

== Shaanxi ==
- Sanxi, Zhenba County

== Sichuan ==
- Sanxi, Jintang County
- Sanxi, Wusheng County
