= G106 =

G106 may refer to:

- China National Highway 106
- WCFS-FM, an AC-formatted radio station licensed to Elmwood Park, Illinois
