= Xialu =

Xialu may refer to:

- Xialu District, in Huangshi, Hubei, China
- Xialu Monastery, or Ṣalu Monastery, in Shigatse, Tibet
