= Yangxin railway station (Hubei) =

Railway station in Huangshi, Hubei

Yangxin 阳新
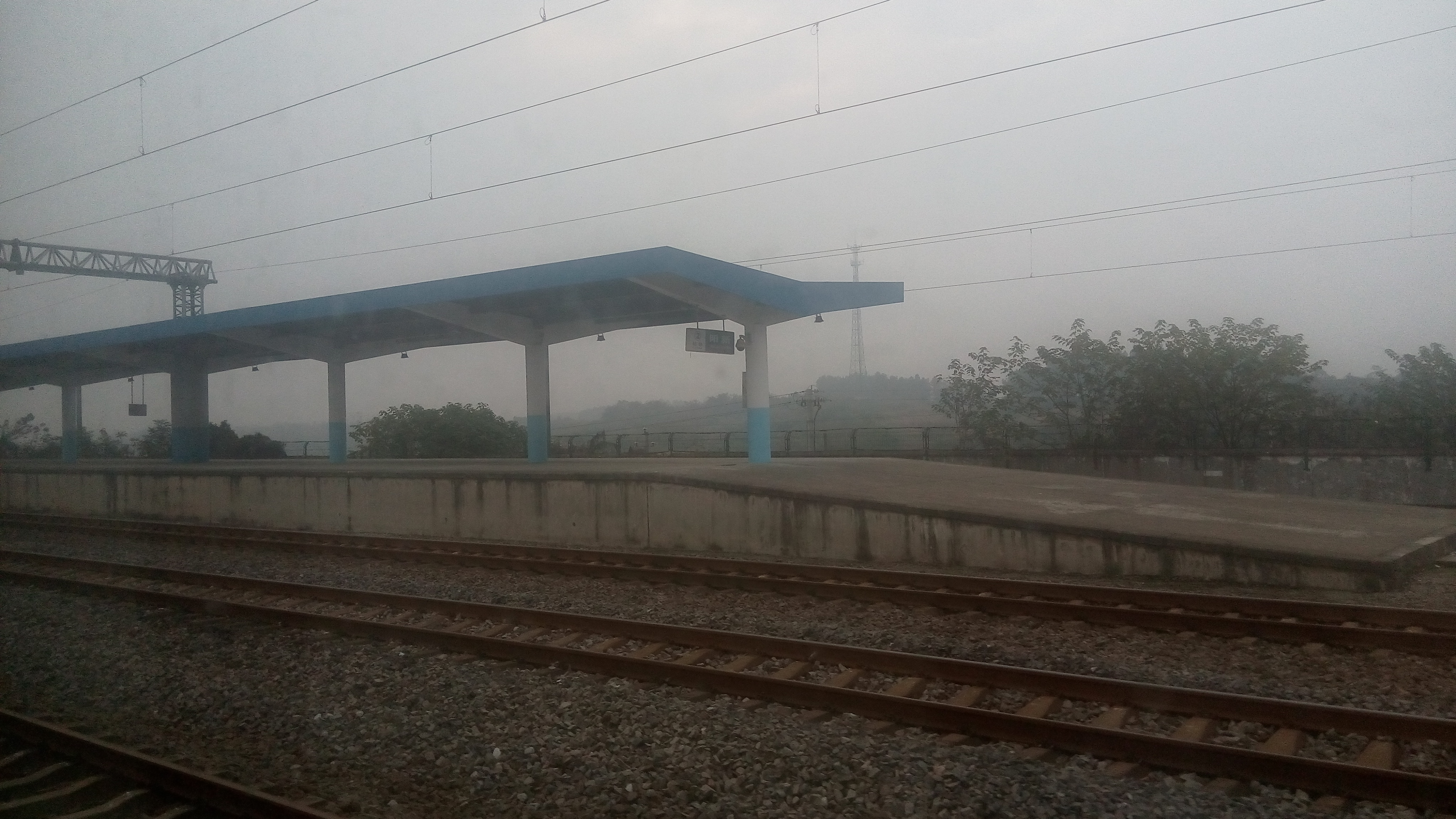

General information
- Location: Yangxin County, Huangshi, Hubei; China
- Coordinates: 29°51′42.00″N 115°10′28.00″E
- Lines: Wuhan–Jiujiang railway; Wuhan–Jiujiang passenger railway
Location

Yangxin railway station (Chinese: 阳新站) is a railway station in Yangxin County, Huangshi, Hubei, China. It is an intermediate stop on the Dezhou–Dajiawa railway and the Wuhan–Jiujiang passenger railway.

== History ==
In 2005, the station was relocated 3 kilometres (1.9 mi) north along the line.

On 21 September 2017, the Wuhan–Jiujiang passenger railway opened and faster services began calling at the station.

| Preceding station | China Railway | Following station |
|---|---|---|
| Huangshi towards Wuchang | Wuhan–Jiujiang railway | Ruichang towards Lushan |
| Preceding station | China Railway High-speed | Following station |
| Baishapu towards Wuhan | Wuhan–Jiujiang high-speed railway | Ruichang West towards Jiujiang or Lushan |
