= Linjiang (disambiguation) =

Linjiang (临江市) is a county-level city of Jilin, China.

Linjiang may refer to:

- Zhong County, formerly named Linjiang (临江), county of Chongqing Municipality

Subdistricts (临江街道)

- Linjiang Subdistrict, Cangshan District, Fuzhou, Fujian
- Linjiang Subdistrict, Licheng District, Quanzhou, Fujian
- Linjiang Subdistrict, Xisaishan District, Huangshi, Hubei
- Linjiang Subdistrict, Chuanying District, Jilin City, Jilin
- Linjiang Subdistrict, Ningjiang District, Songyuan, Jilin
- Linjiang Subdistrict, Zhenxing District, Dandong, Liaoning

Towns (临江镇)

- Linjiang, Kai County, Chongqing
- Linjiang, Yongchuan District, Chongqing
- Linjiang, Tongjiang City, Jiamusi, Heilongjiang
- Linjiang, Lanxi County, Suihua, Heilongjiang
- Linjiang, Pucheng County, Nanping, Fujian
- Linjiang, Shanghang County, Longyan, Fujian
- Linjiang, Zijin County, Heyuan, Guangdong
- Linjiang, Haimen City, Nantong, Jiangsu
- Linjiang, Zhangshu City, Yichuan, Jiangxi
- Linjiang, Shizhong District, Leshan, Sichuan
- Linjiang, Yanjiang District, Leshan, Sichuan
- Linjiang, Lucheng District, Wenzhou, Zhejiang
