= Sanxi, Yangxin County =

Sanxi 三溪镇
- Town
- Location in Hubei.
- Coordinates: 29°49′46″N 114°57′28″E
- Country: People's Republic of China
- Province: Hubei
- Prefecture-level city: Huangshi
- County: Yangxin County

Area
  - Total: 144.71 km^{2} (55.87 sq mi)

Population (2017)
  - Total: 38,387
  - Density: 265.27/km^{2} (687.04/sq mi)
- Time zone: UTC+08:00 (China Standard)
- Postal code: 435234
- Area code: 0714

Chinese name
- Traditional Chinese: 三溪鎮
- Simplified Chinese: 三溪镇
Transcriptions
Standard Mandarin
- Hanyu Pinyin: Sānxī Zhèn

Sanxi (Chinese: 三溪镇) is a town in Yangxin County, Hubei, China. As of the 2017 census it had a population of 38,387 and an area of 144.71-square-kilometre (55.87 sq mi). It is surrounded by Yinzu Town of Daye City on the north, Wangying Town on the west, Futu Town on the east, and Military Reclamation State Farm on the south.

== Etymology ==
Sanxi means three streams. It is named Sanxi because Wangying Stream (王英河), Daye Stream (大冶河), and Guohe Stream (国和河) meet in the town.

== History ==
It was incorporated as a town in the Jiajing period (1522–1566) of the Ming dynasty (1368–1644). It was called Sanxikou Town (三溪口镇) in the Ming dynasty. In the Qing dynasty (1644–1911), it was renamed "Sanxikou City" (三溪口市). In 1935, it was the district seat of the Third District (第三区). In 1952, it came under the jurisdiction of the Seventh District (第七区). It was renamed "Sanxi Commune" (三溪公社) in 1958 and was renamed "Sanxi District" (三溪区) in 1961.

== Administrative division ==
The town is divided into one community and fifteen villages:

- Sanxikou Community (三溪社区)
- Longquan (龙泉村)
- Shangyu (上余村)
- Guankuang (冠圹村)
- Baishu (柏树村)
- Junlin (军林村)
- Jiangfu (姜福村)
- Gaoqiao (高桥村)
- Changhe (长河村)
- Yaji (丫吉村)
- Hengshan (横山村)
- Lizhong (立中村)
- Baxiang (八湘村)
- Zhulin (竹林村)
- Huangchong (黄冲村)
- Sanxikou (三溪口村)

== Geography ==
The highest point in the town is Mount Dawo (大窝山) which stands 479 metres (1,572 ft) above sea level. The lowest point is Li Lake (里湖), which, at 20 metres (66 ft) above sea level.

Wangying Stream (王英河), Daye Stream (大冶河), and Guohe Stream (国和河) flow through the town.

The town is in the subtropical monsoon climate zone.

== Economy ==
The town's agriculture is mainly rice, corn and vegetables.

The town is rich in manganese, coal, limestone, calcite, crystal stone, and marble.

== Transport ==
G45 Daqing–Guangzhou Expressway passes across the town north to south.

Provincial Highway S317 travels through the town.

== Attractions ==
Sanjiaoshan (三教山) is a Buddhist temple in the town.

== Notable people ==
- Wu Guolun, Ming dynasty writer.
- Wu Fusheng (吴甫生), Qing dynasty politician.
- Pan Guangzao (潘光藻), Qing dynasty politician.
- Wang Bochao (王伯超), a legendary soldier during the Republic of China.
