= Baisha, Huangshi =

Baisha 白沙镇
- Town
- Location in Hubei
- Coordinates: 29°57′38″N 115°3′57″E
- Country: People's Republic of China
- Province: Hubei
- Prefecture-level city: Huangshi
- County: Yangxin County
- Time zone: UTC+8 (China Standard)

Baisha (Chinese: 白沙) is a town of Yangxin County, Huangshi, Hubei, China. As of 2018, it has one residential community and 38 villages under its administration.
