= Chutian Times =

Chinese newspaper

Chutian Times 楚天时报
- Type: Daily newspaper
- Founded: December 28, 2010
- Language: Chinese
- Headquarters: Huangshi
- Website: www.cttimes.cn

Chutian Times (Chinese: 楚天时报), also known as Chutian Shibao, was a simplified Chinese newspaper published in the People's Republic of China. It was launched in Huangshi on December 28, 2010, as the Eastern Hubei edition of Chutian Metropolis Daily (楚天都市报). It was a metropolitan newspaper mainly for readers in Huangshi and eastern Hubei. Currently, it has ceased publication.

== History ==
Chutian Times was approved by the National Press and Publication General Administration of China. The newspaper was jointly supervised by the Propaganda Department of the Hubei Provincial Committee of the Chinese Communist Party (中共湖北省委宣传部) and the Information Office of the Hubei Provincial People's Government (湖北省人民政府新闻办公室), and sponsored by Hubei Daily Media Group.

On March 11, 2011, www.cttimes.cn, the official website of Chutian Times officially went live, the domain name of the website was created on January 26 of the same year.
