= Yangxin railway station =

Yangxin railway station may refer to:

- Yangxin railway station (Hubei)
- Yangxin railway station (Shandong)
