= Tieshan, Huangshi =

Tieshan 铁山区
- District
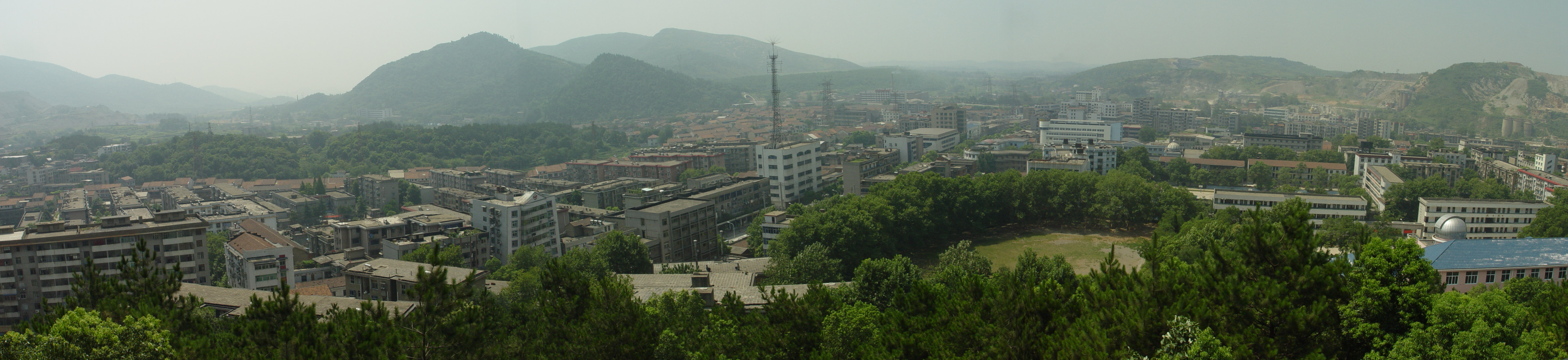
- General view of Tieshan

- Location in Hubei
- Coordinates: 30°12′23″N 114°54′01″E
- Country: People's Republic of China
- Province: Hubei
- Prefecture-level city: Huangshi

Area
  - Total: 28.7 km^{2} (11.1 sq mi)

Population (2020)
  - Total: 41,907
  - Density: 1,460/km^{2} (3,780/sq mi)
- Time zone: UTC+8 (China Standard)
- Postal code
- Website: www.hsts.gov.cn (in Chinese)

Tieshan District (simplified Chinese: 铁山区; traditional Chinese: 鐵山區; pinyin: Tiěshān Qū) is a district of the prefecture-level city of Huangshi, Hubei province, People's Republic of China. Small in area (28.7 square kilometres (11.1 sq mi)), it is squeezed between the "county-level city" Daye to the south and west, Huangshi's Xialu District to the east, and the prefecture-level city of Ezhou to the north. Physically, it is a small mining town.

As its name indicates ("Tieshan" means "Iron Mountain"), the district owes its existence to iron-ore mines.

The town is served by China National Highway 106, which also doubles as China National Highway 316 in this part of Hubei.

The only administrative direct subdivision is a town-simulating village (区直辖村模拟镇).
