= Edong Yangtze River Bridge =

Edong Bridge 鄂东长江大桥
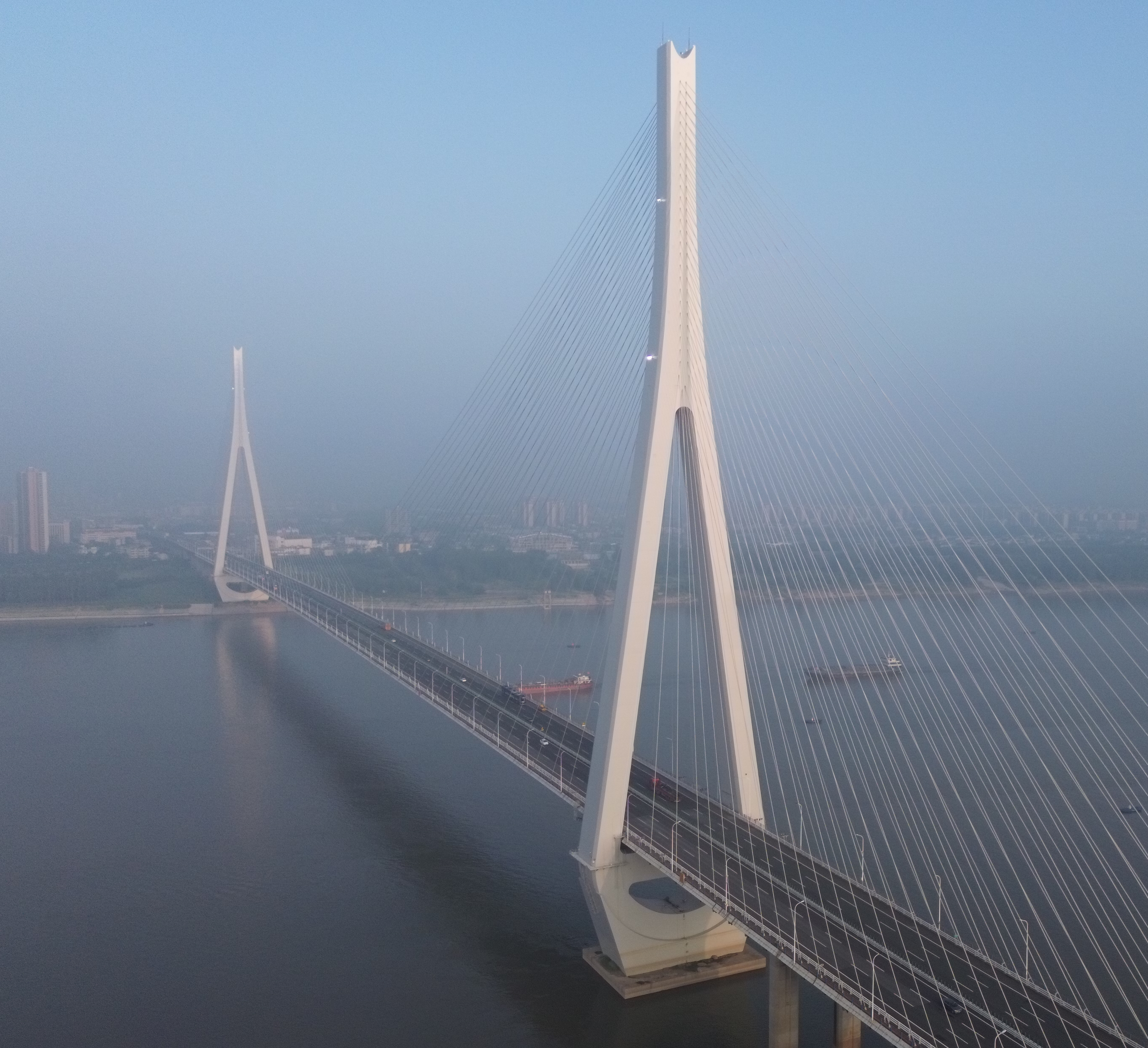
- Coordinates: 30°15′38″N 115°04′20″E
- Carries: G45 Daqing–Guangzhou Expressway; G50 Shanghai–Chongqing Expressway
- Crosses: Yangtze River
- Locale: Huangshigang, Hubei, China

Characteristics
- Design: Cable-stayed
- Material: Concrete
- Total length: span length 1,486 m (4,875 ft)
- Width: 33 m (108 ft)
- Height: 242.5 m (796 ft)
- Longest span: 926 m (3,038 ft)

History
- Construction start: 2008
- Opened: 2010

Location
- Interactive map of Edong Bridge

The Edong Yangtze River Bridge (Chinese: 鄂东长江大桥) is a cable-stayed bridge across the Yangtze River in Hubei Province in eastern China. The bridge connects Huangshi and Xishui County and forms part of the G45 Daqing–Guangzhou Expressway and the G50 Shanghai–Chongqing Expressway. Construction of the bridge started in 2008 and it was completed in 2010. With a main span of 926 m (3,038 ft) it is currently the fourth longest cable-stayed bridge in the world.

== See also ==
- Yangtze River bridges and tunnels
- List of largest cable-stayed bridges
- List of tallest bridges in the world
