= China National Highway 106 =

Road in China

National Highway 106
- 106国道

Route information
- Length: 2,466 km (1,532 mi)

Major junctions
- From: Beijing
- To: Guangzhou, Guangdong

Location
- Country: China

Highway system
- National Trunk Highway System; Primary; Auxiliary
← G105	→ G107

China National Highway 106 (G106; Chinese: 106国道, 106 Guo Dao) is a road from Beijing to Guangzhou.

It leaves Beijing at Yuquanying and heads to Gu'an County, Bazhou (Hebei), Kaifeng (Henan), Ezhou (Hubei), and eventually Guangzhou (Guangdong) on the south China coast, in total spanning approximately 2466 km.,

Within the Huangshi prefecture-level city In eastern Hubei (from near Ezhou and to the Jiangxi border), G106 coincides with G316.

== Route and distance ==
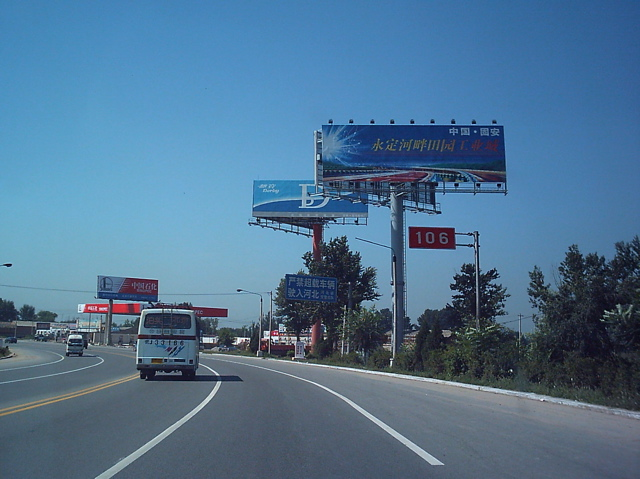
G106 in Gu'an County, Hebei (August 2004 image)

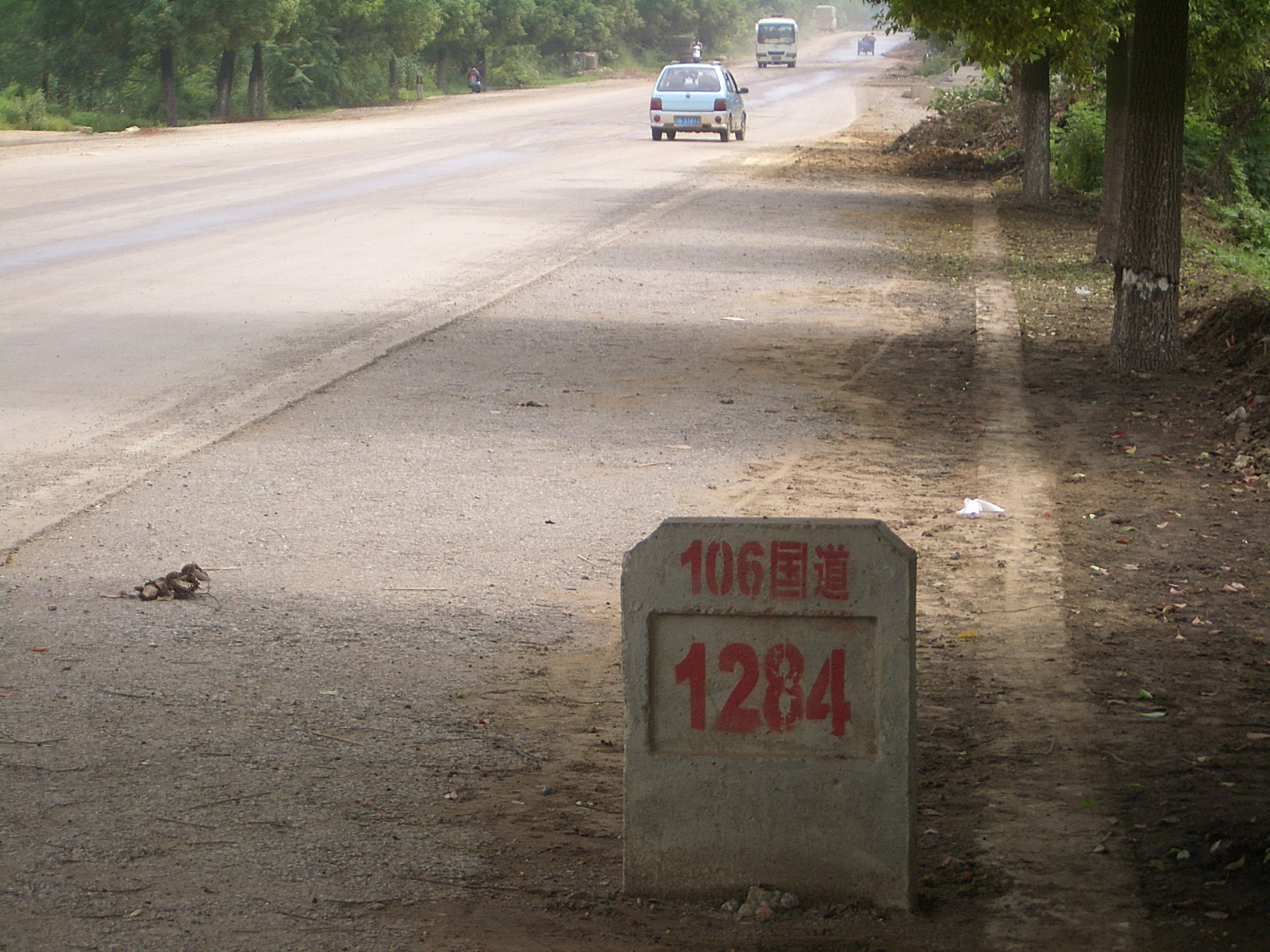
1284 km from Beijing (near Daye, Hubei)

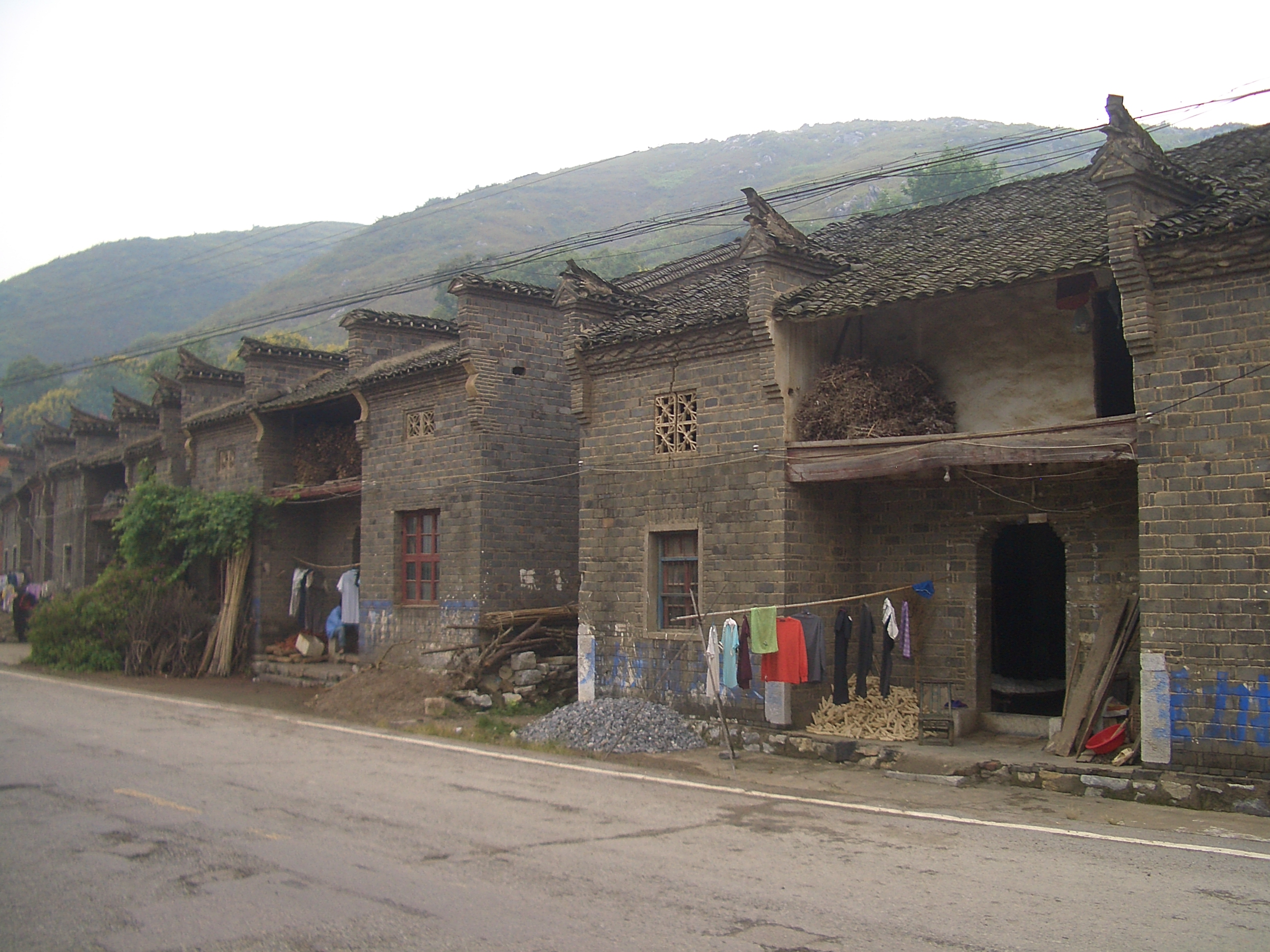
Combined G106/G316 forms the main street of many villages in Yangxin County, Hubei

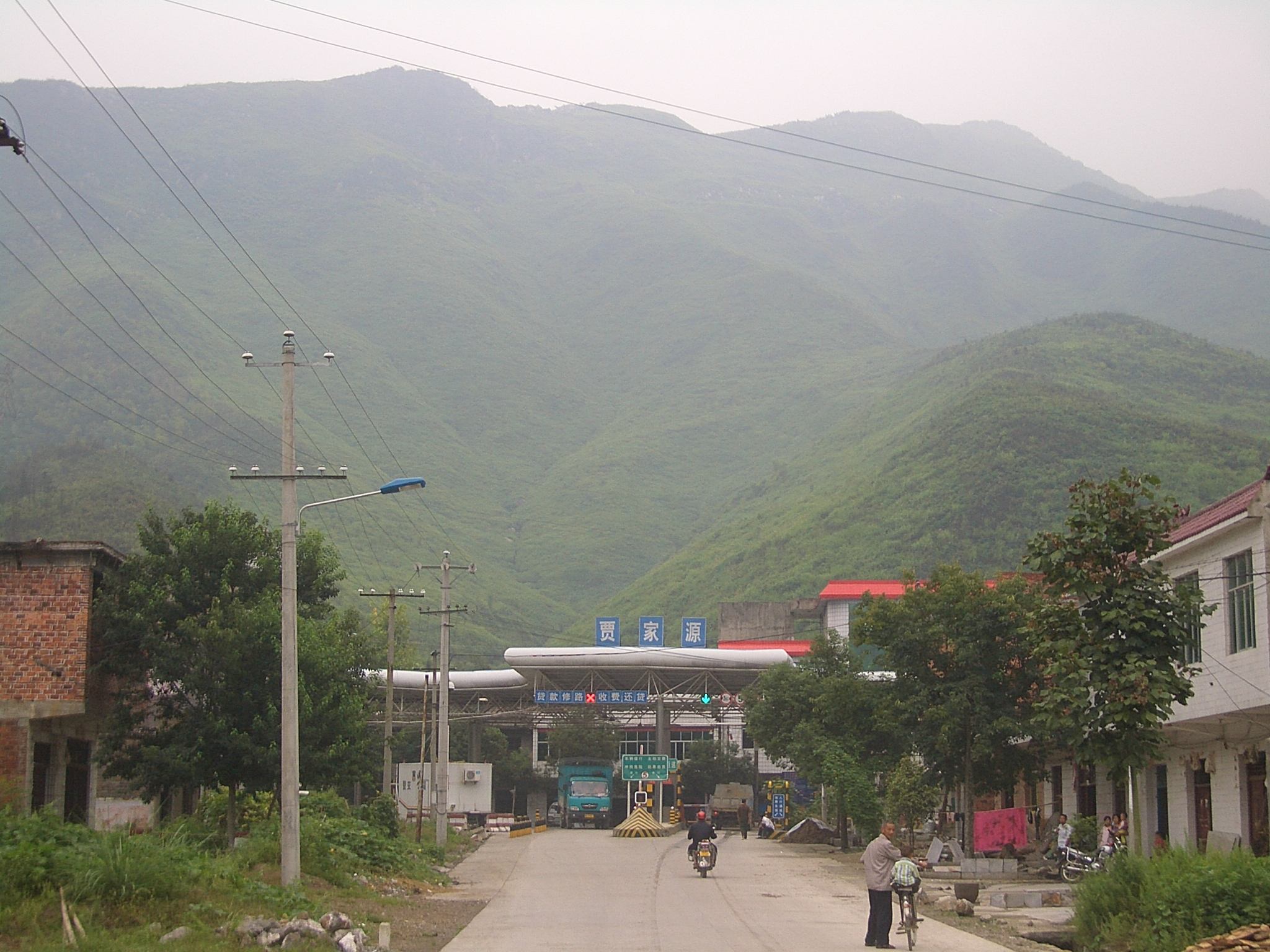
Near junction with G316 in Tongshan County, Hubei

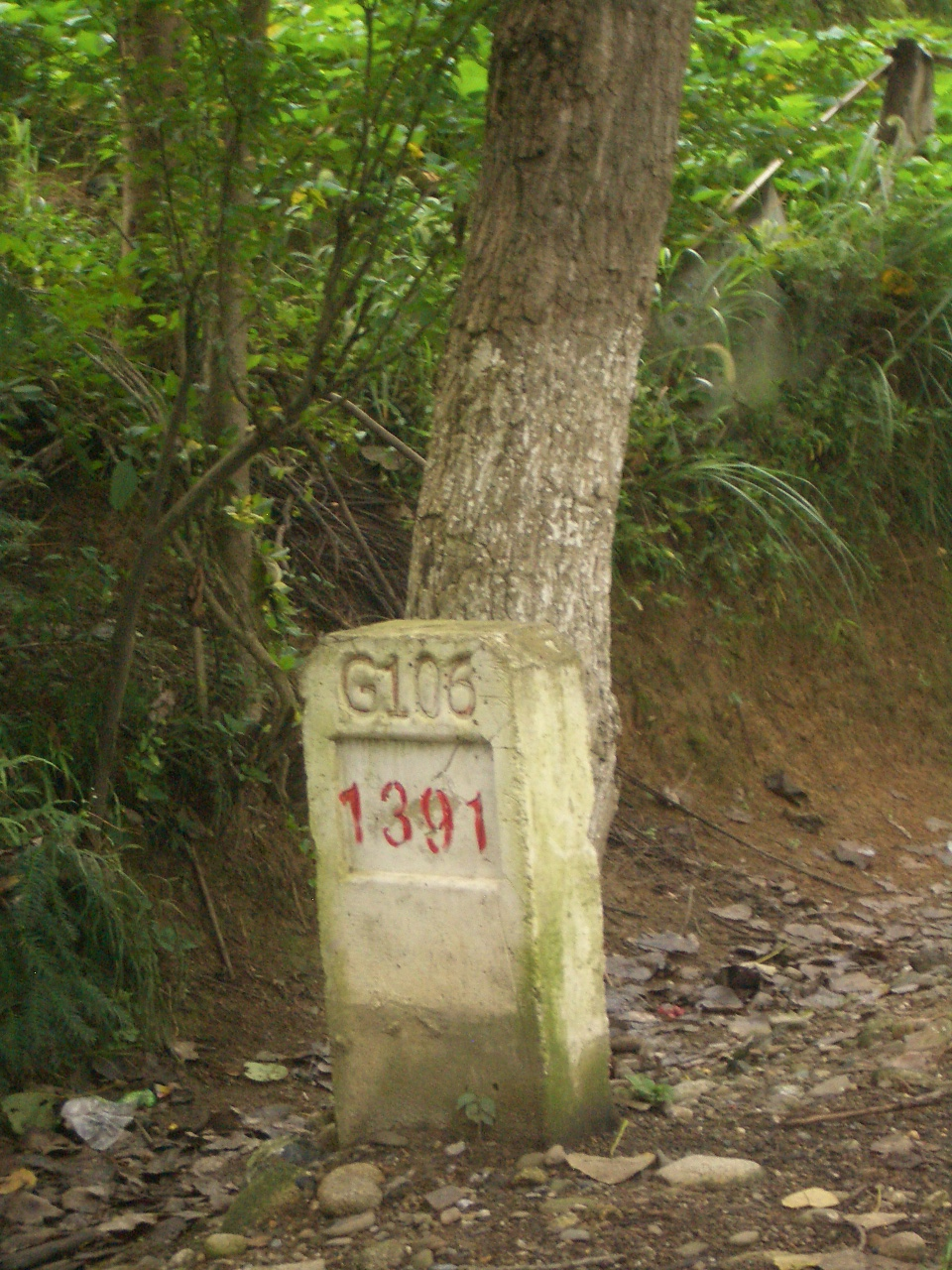
1391 km from Beijing (between Honggang and Jiugongshan in Tongshan County, Hubei)

Route and distance

City	Distance (km)
Beijing, Beijing	0
Daxing, Beijing	16
Gu'an County, Hebei	50
Bazhou, Hebei	86
Renqiu, Hebei	141
Hejian, Hebei	170
Wuyi County, Hebei	252
Hengshui, Hebei	280
Jizhou, Hebei	310
Nangong, Hebei	339
Wei County, Hebei	387
Guantao, Hebei	440
Nanle, Henan	497
Qingfeng, Henan	521
Puyang, Henan	540
Dongming, Shandong	606
Lankao, Henan	671
Qi County, Kaifeng, Henan	701
Taikang County, Henan	759
Huaiyang, Henan	796
Xiangcheng, Henan	834
Xincai, Henan	920
Huangchuan, Henan	993
Macheng, Hubei	1115
Xinzhou, Hubei	1173
Huanggang, Hubei	1234
Ezhou, Hubei	1239
Tieshan District, Hubei	1273
Daye, Hubei	1290
Tongshan County, Hubei	1423
Chongyang County, Hubei	1473
Tongcheng County, Hubei	1519
Pingjiang County, Hunan	1597
Liuyang, Hunan	1687
Liling, Hunan	1756
You County, Hunan	1836
Chaling, Hunan	1873
Yanling, Hunan	1930
Guidong, Hunan	2020
Rucheng, Hunan	2101
Renhua, Guangdong	2178
Shaoguan, Guangdong	2232
Qujiang, Guangdong	2249
Fogang, Guangdong	2412
Huadu, Guangdong	2439
Guangzhou, Guangdong	2466

== See also ==
- China National Highways
