= Wuhan–Jiujiang railway =

Railway line in China

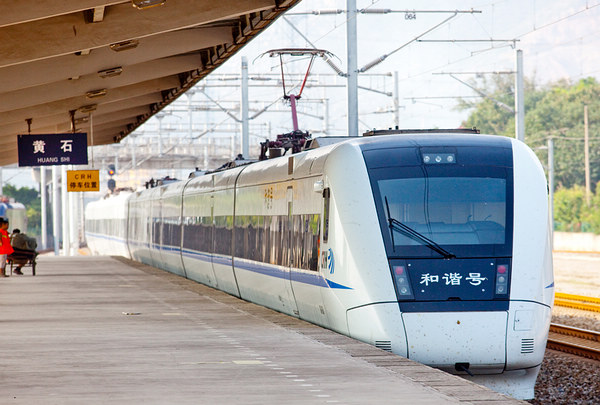
- At Huangshi Station

Overview
- Native name: 武九铁路
- Locale: Hubei; Jiangxi
- Termini: Wuchang; Lushan

Service
- Operator(s): China Railway High-speed

History
- Opened: 1 July 1987

Technical
- Line length: 239 km (149 mi)
- Number of tracks: 2
- Track gauge: 1,435 mm (4 ft 8 1/2 in)
- Electrification: 25 kV/50 Hz AC overhead catenary
- Operating speed: 200 km/h (124 mph) (Heliu–Yangxin); 120 km/h (75 mph) (other sections)

The Wuhan–Jiujiang railway or Wujiu railway (simplified Chinese: 武九铁路; traditional Chinese: 武九鐵路; pinyin: wǔjǐu tiělù), is a double-track, electrified railroad in central China between Wuhan in Hubei Province and Jiujiang in Jiangxi Province. The line is 258 km (160 mi) long and follows the south bank of the Yangtze River from Wuchang District in Wuhan to Lushan Station in Jiujiang. Major cities and towns along the route include Wuhan, Huarong, Huanggang, Ezhou, Huangshi, Daye Yangxin, Ruichang and Jiujiang.

== History ==
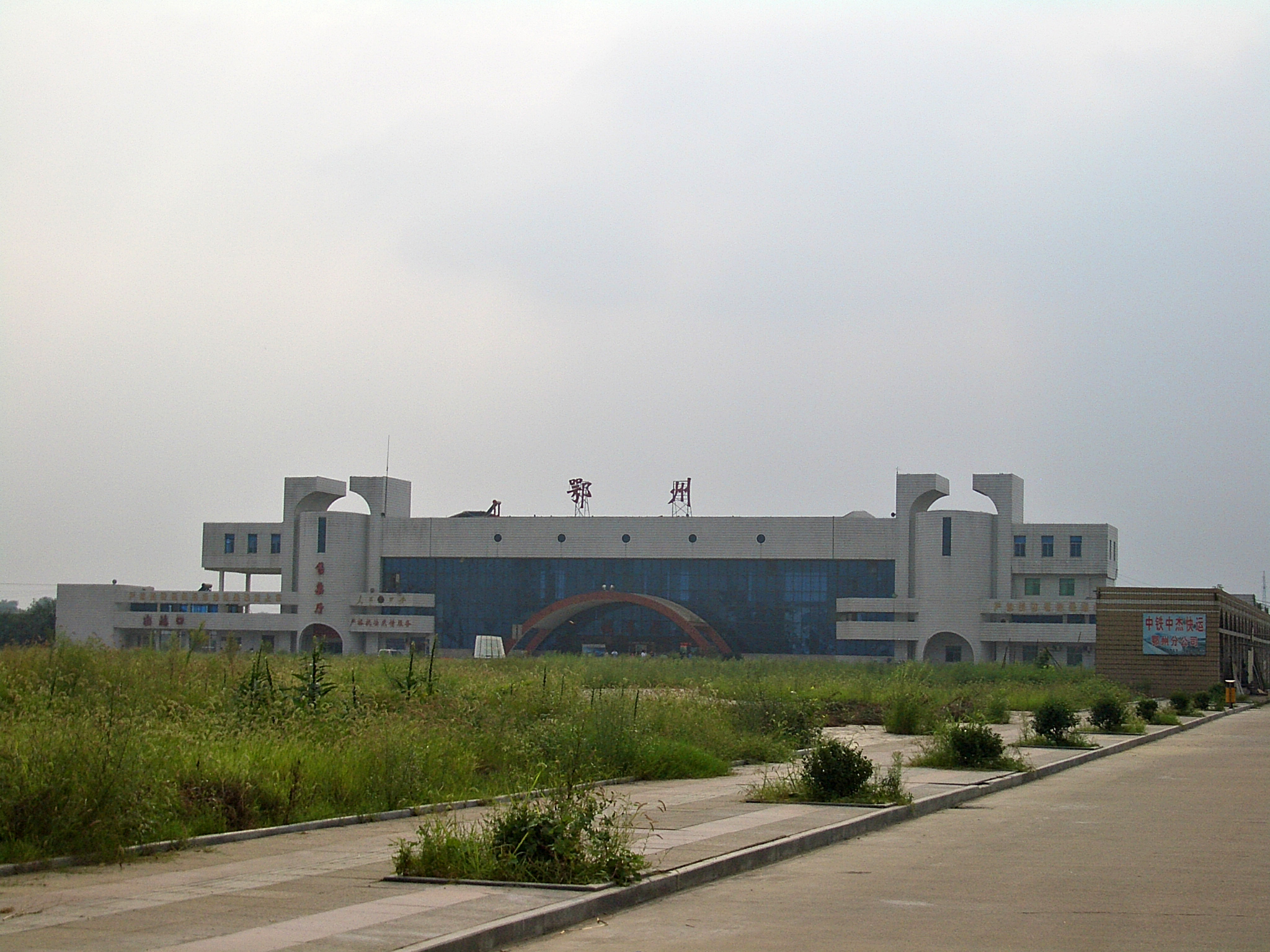
Ezhou railway station

The Wuhan–Jiujiang railway was created from the merger of the Wuhan–Daye and Daye–Shahejie railways in December 1989. The Wuhan–Daye or Wuda railway, from Wuchang to Daye, was built in 1958 to facilitate the transport of iron ore mined in Tieshan District near Daye. The Daye–Shahejie or Dasha railway, from Daye to Shahejie in Jiujiang, was built from 1983 to 1987. The eastern terminus of the line, Lushan Station, is located in Shahejie. The combined Wujiu Line was doubled-tracked from 2003 to 2005 and electrified from 2008 to 2010. Passenger trains can reach speeds of up to 250 km/h (155 mph) on the line.

The line was formerly used by the frequent D-series high-speed trains running from Wuhan (mostly, the Wuchang Station) to Nanchang and points south and east (throughout Fujian and Zhejiang).

The Wuhan–Jiujiang passenger railway, which was opened on 21 September 2017, has been built along a route generally similar to that of the Wuhan–Jiujiang railway. This has taken over much of the passenger service that formerly operated on the Wuhan–Jiujiang railway. The section from Wuchang to Nanmeimiao, passing through Shahu, Wuchang North and Badajia, was closed 11 May 2018. Dismantling commenced on 24 May and it is proposed to transform the corridor into a railway-themed landscape. Trains are now required to use the southern ring railway to reach Wuchang. Most stations on the remaining line are no longer served by passenger services.

== Rail connections ==
- Wuhan: Beijing–Guangzhou railway, Hankou–Danjiangkou railway, Beijing–Guangzhou–Shenzhen–Hong Kong high-speed railway, Hefei–Wuhan railway
- Jiujiang: Beijing–Kowloon railway, Hefei–Jiujiang railway, Tongling–Jiujiang railway, Nanchang–Jiujiang intercity railway

== See also ==
- List of railways in China
