= Huangshi Yangtze River Bridge =

Huangshi Bridge 黄石长江大桥
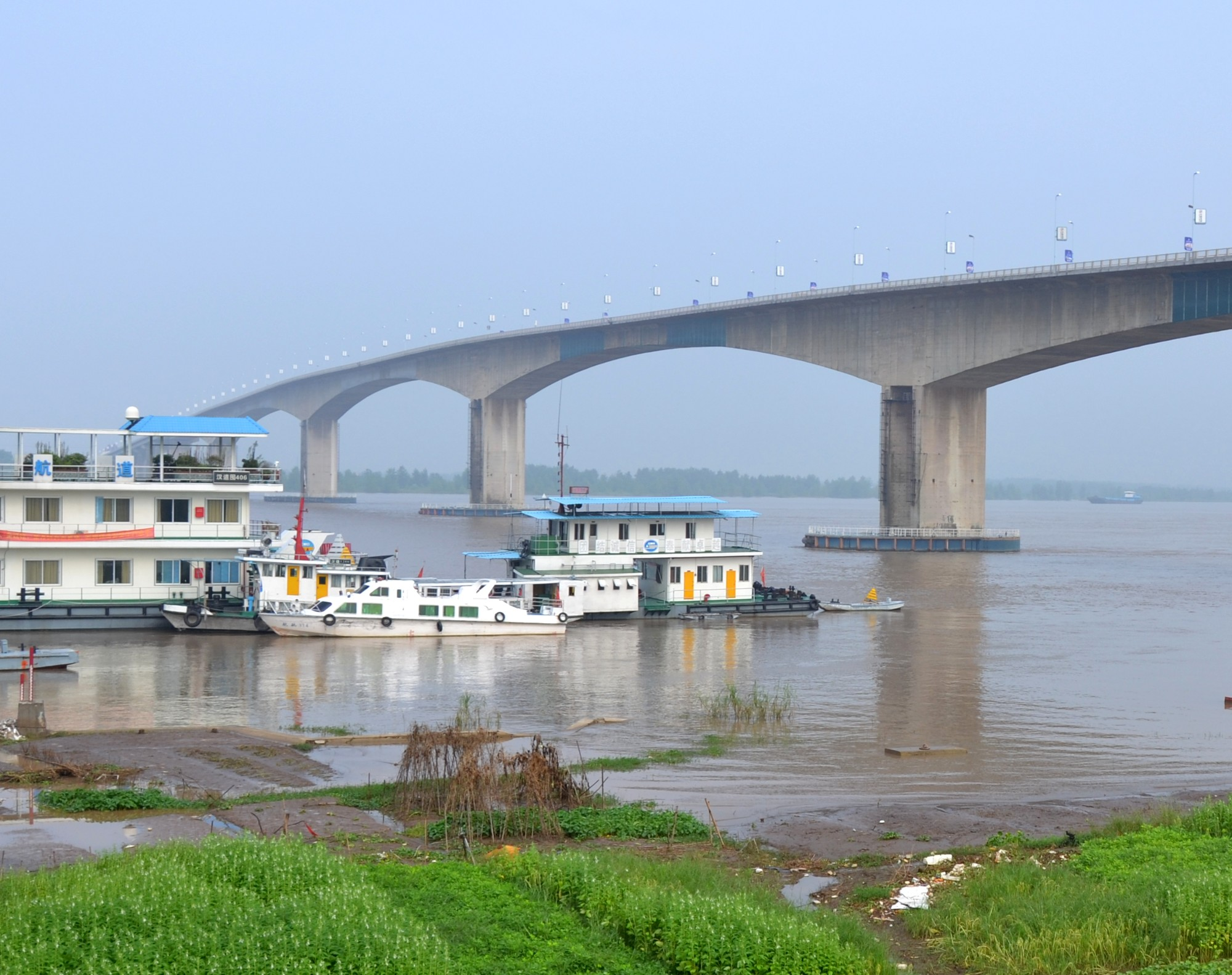
- Coordinates: 30.251245°N 115.072088°E
- Crosses: Yangtze River
- Locale: Huangshi, Hubei, China

Characteristics
- Design: box girder bridge
- Material: Prestressed concrete
- Total length: total span: 1,060 m (3,480 ft) total length: 2,580 m (8,460 ft)
- Longest span: 245 m (804 ft)

History
- Construction start: 1991
- Opened: 1995

The Huangshi Yangtze River Bridge (Chinese: 黄石长江大桥) is a box girder bridge across the Yangtze River in Huangshi, Hubei Province in central China. The bridge is made of prestressed concrete. The bridge has a total length of 2,580 m (8,460 ft), including a total span length of 1,060 m (3,480 ft), including three main spans each measuring 245 m (804 ft). The bridge was built from 1991 and 1995. In 2002, defects in the structure were discovered, prompting the need for renovation.

== See also ==
- Yangtze River bridges and tunnels
- List of largest cable-stayed bridges
- List of tallest bridges in the world
