= Xisaishan, Huangshi =

Xisaishan 西塞山区
- District
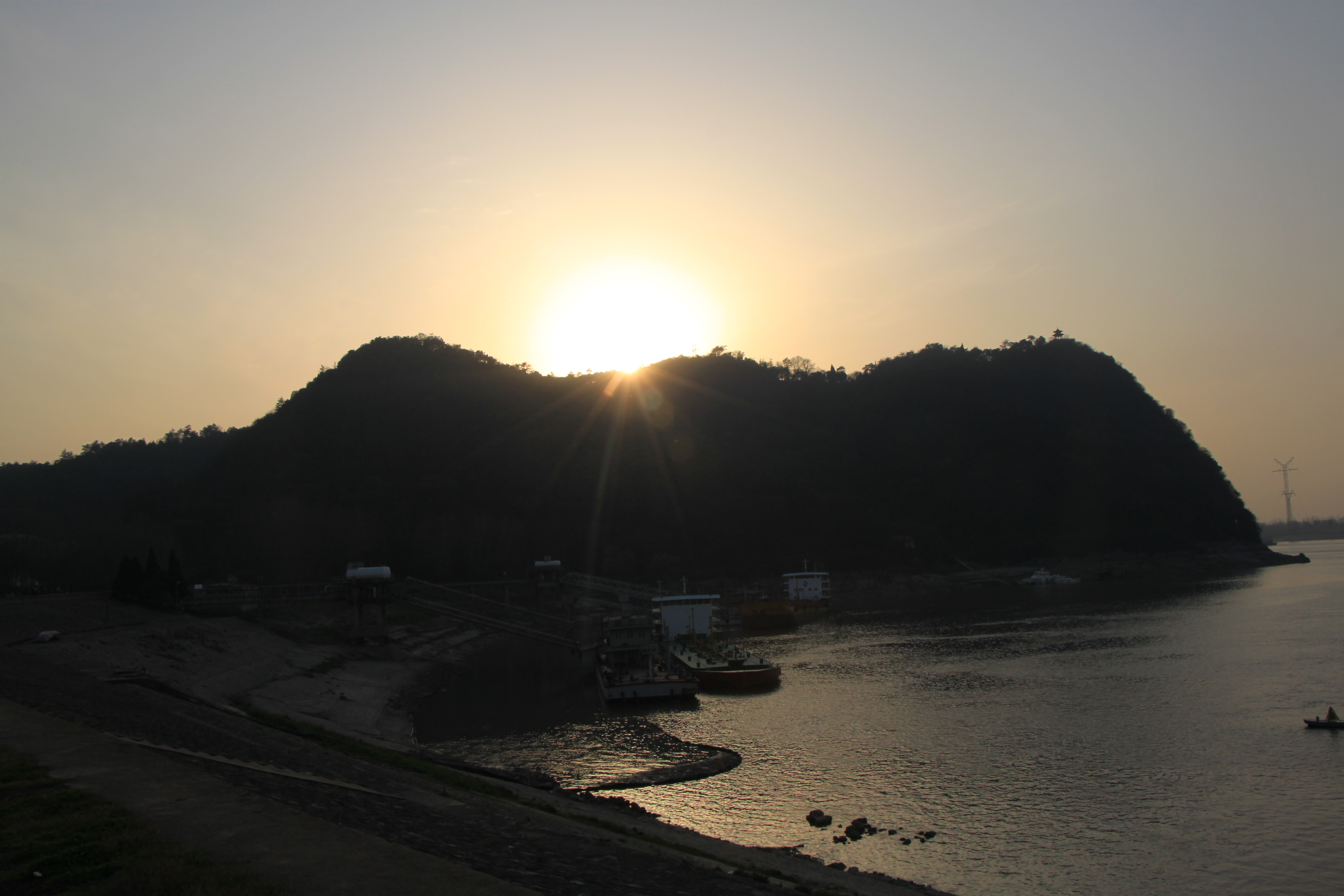
- Mount Xisai

- Location in Hubei
- Coordinates (Xisaishan Bureau of water usage (西塞山区水利局)): 30°12′19″N 115°06′37″E
- Country: People's Republic of China
- Province: Hubei
- Prefecture-level city: Huangshi

Area
  - Total: 113.2 km^{2} (43.7 sq mi)

Population (2020 census)
  - Total: 197,217
  - Density: 1,742/km^{2} (4,512/sq mi)
- Time zone: UTC+8 (China Standard)
- Website: 黄石市西塞山区人民政府

Xisaishan District (simplified Chinese: 西塞山区; traditional Chinese: 西塞山區; pinyin: Xīsàishān Qū) is a district of the city of Huangshi, Hubei, People's Republic of China. On April 19, 2012, a major reform of the district's administrative divisions was carried out. The district received the Chang'an Cup award in 2017.
