= Huangshigang, Huangshi =

Huangshigang 黄石港区
- District
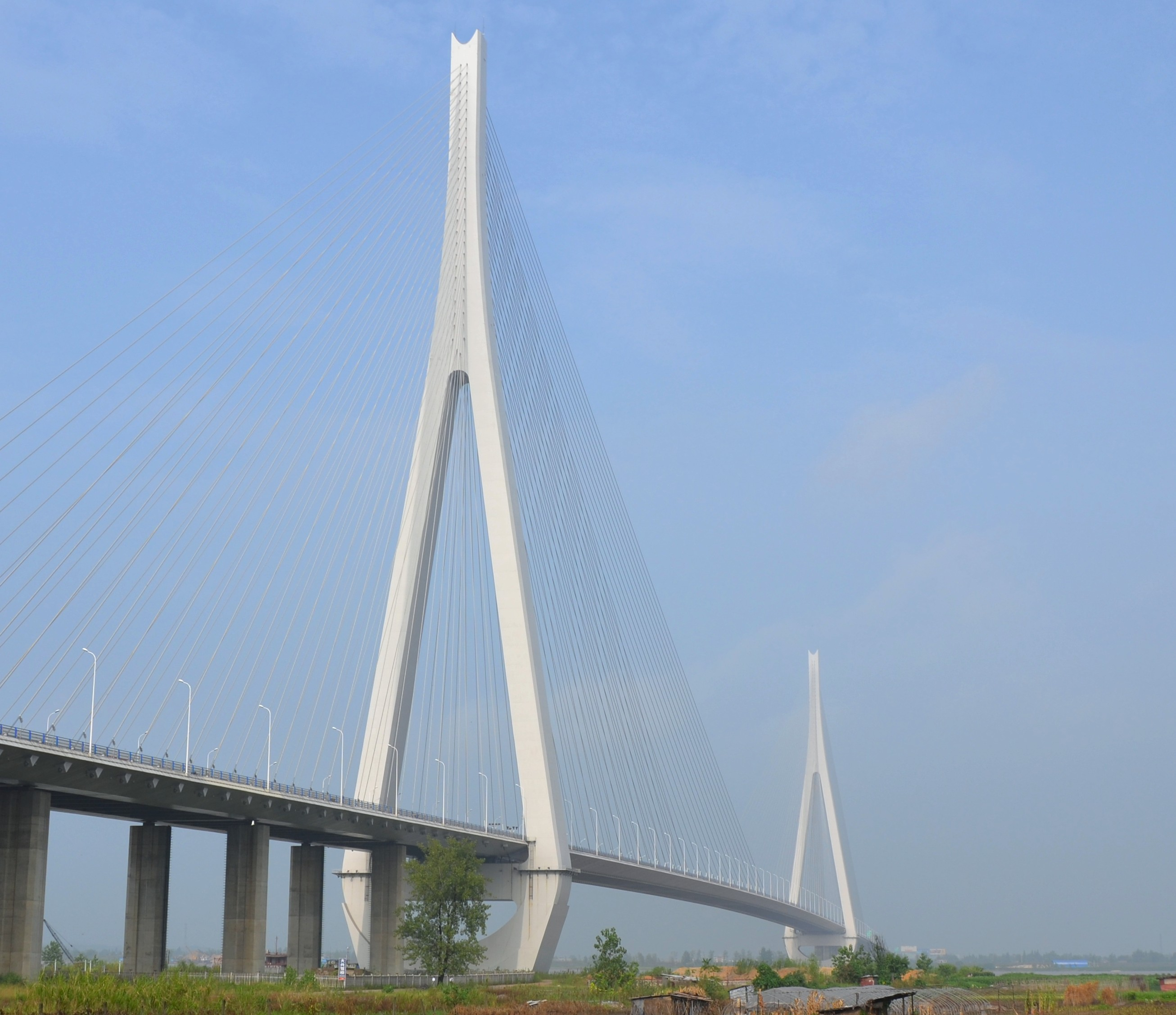
- Edong Yangtze River Bridge

- Location in Hubei
- Coordinates: 30°13′24″N 115°03′55″E
- Country: China
- Province: Hubei
- Prefecture-level city: Huangshi
- District seat: Shenjiaying Subdistrict

Area
  - Total: 23.5 km^{2} (9.1 sq mi)

Population (2020 census)
  - Total: 241,589
  - Density: 10,300/km^{2} (26,600/sq mi)
- Time zone: UTC+8 (China Standard)
- Website: www.huangshigang.gov.cn (in Chinese)

Huangshigang District (simplified Chinese: 黄石港区; traditional Chinese: 黃石港區; pinyin: Huángshígǎng Qū) is a district of the city of Huangshi, Hubei province, located on the western (right) bank of the Yangtze River. Edong Bridge is located in this district.

== Administrative subdivisions ==
Huangshigang District administers 4 subdistricts and 1 township-level management district:

- Shenjiaying Subdistrict (沈家营街道)
- Huangshigang Subdistrict (黄石港街道)
- Shengyanggang Subdistrict (胜阳港街道)
- Huahu Subdistrict (花湖街道)
- Jiangbei Management district (江北管理区)
