= Xialu, Huangshi =

Xialu 下陆区
- District
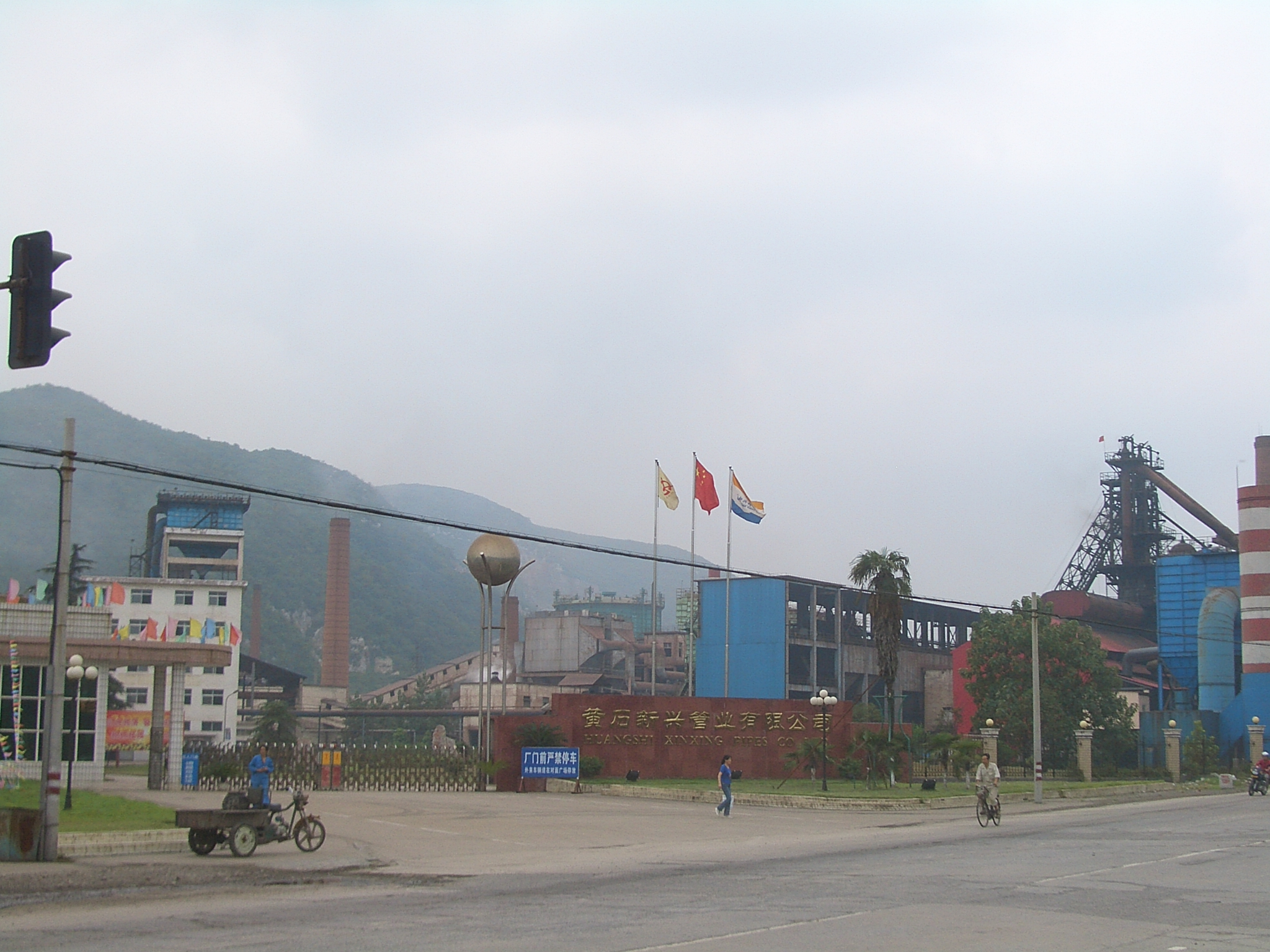
- A pipe factory in Xialu District

- Location in Hubei
- Coordinates (Xialu government / Xialu Square): 30°10′25″N 114°57′40″E
- Country: People's Republic of China
- Province: Hubei
- Prefecture-level city: Huangshi

Area
  - Total: 62.01 km^{2} (23.94 sq mi)

Population (2020)
  - Total: 215,181
  - Density: 3,470/km^{2} (8,988/sq mi)
- Time zone: UTC+8 (China Standard)
- Website: www.xialuqu.gov.cn(in Chinese)

Xialu District (simplified Chinese: 下陆区; traditional Chinese: 下陸區; pinyin: Xiàlù Qū) is an administrative district of the prefecture-level city of Huangshi, Hubei province, People's Republic of China. It is a fairly small industrial and residential district, located to the west of Huangshi's downtown Huangshigang District. Since the elimination of three subdistricts in May 2011, the district has been divided into four township-level divisions including Tuanchengshan Subdistrict (团城山街道).

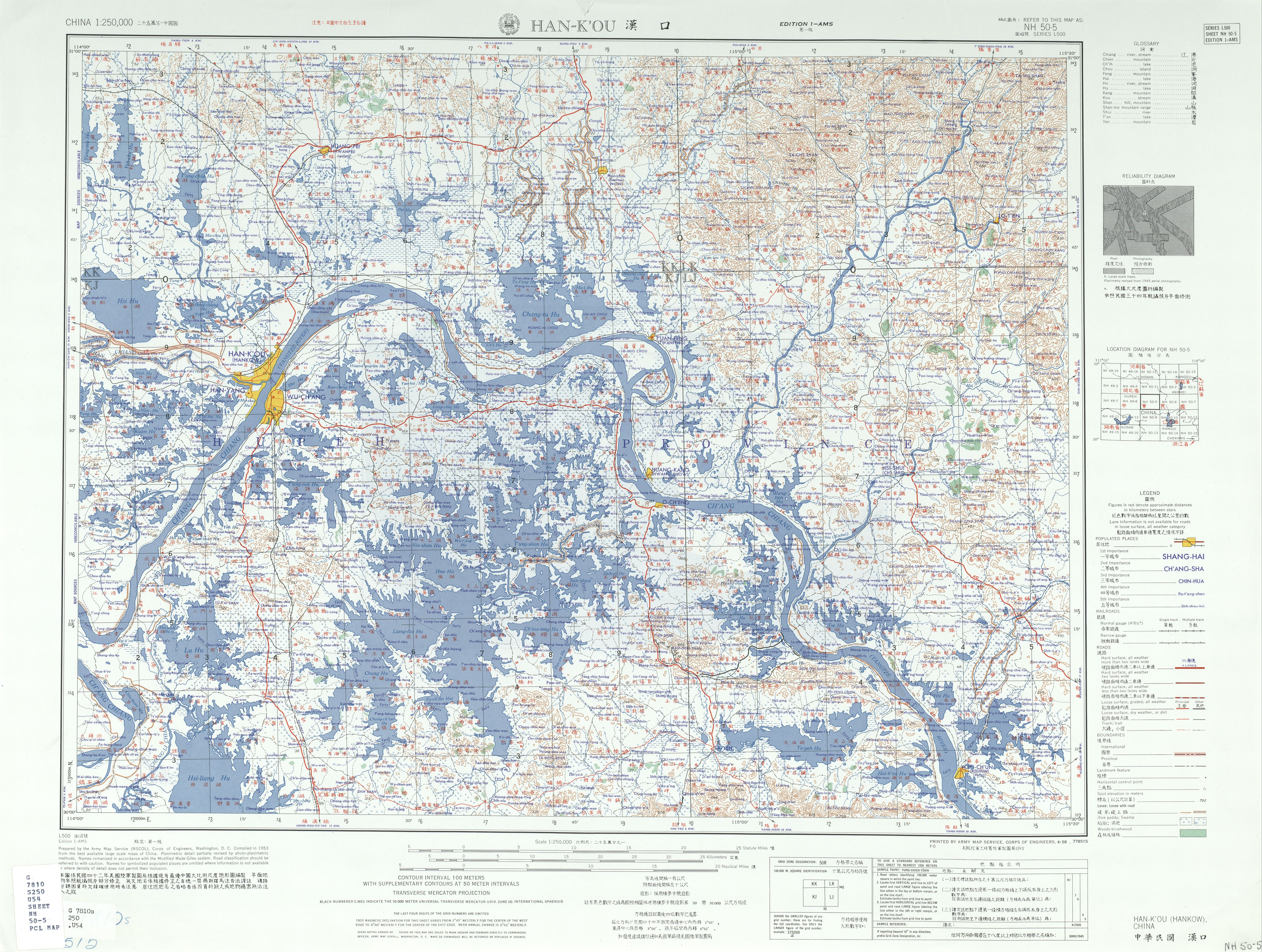
Map including Xialu (labeled as Hsia-lu 下陸) (1953)
