= Daye =

Daye 大冶市 Tayeh
- County-level city
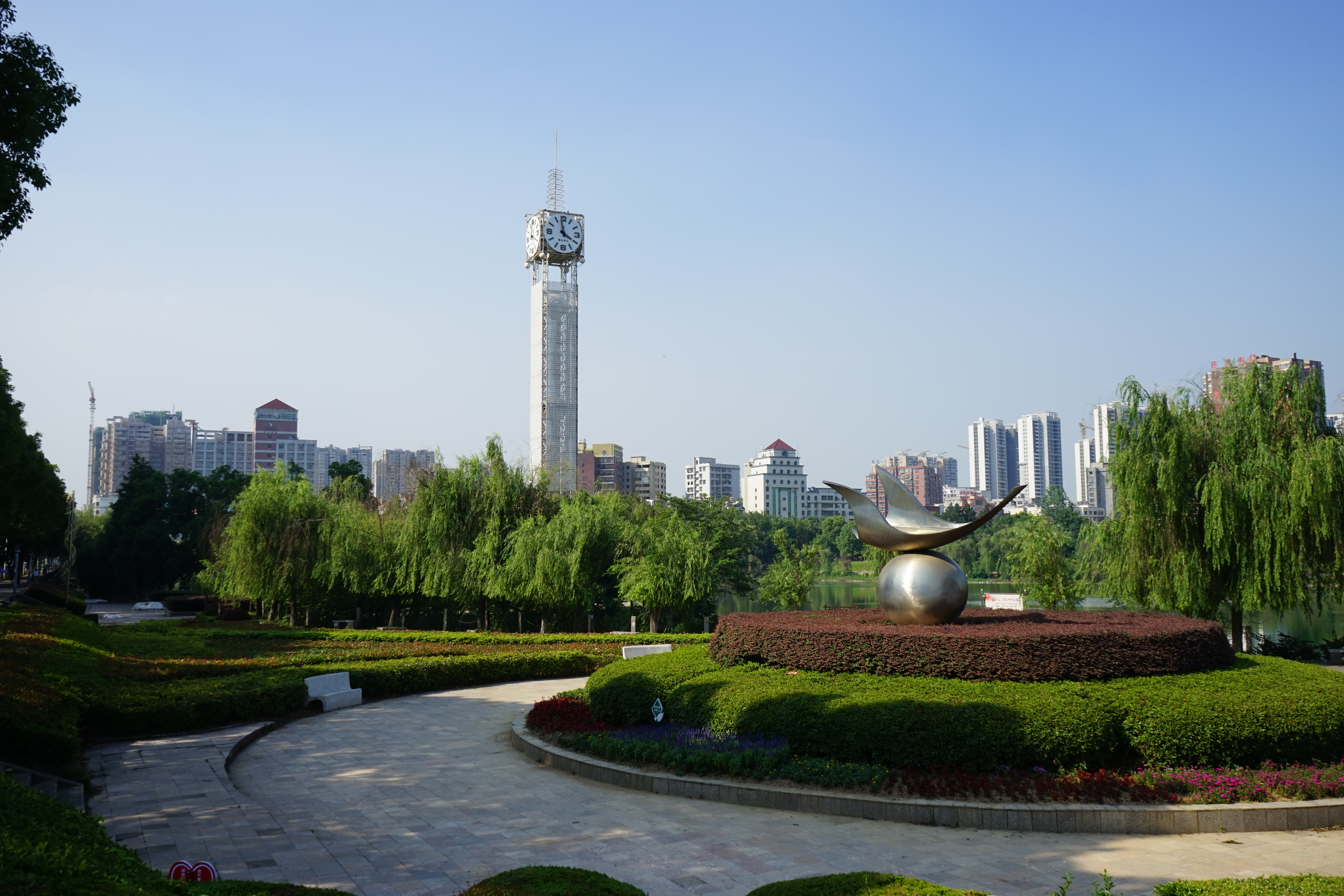
- Century Clock and nearby buildings

- Location in Hubei
- Coordinates (Daye municipal government): 30°05′46″N 114°58′49″E
- Country: People's Republic of China
- Province: Hubei
- Prefecture-level city: Huangshi

Area
  - County-level city: 1,566.0 km^{2} (604.6 sq mi)
  - Urban: 276.68 km^{2} (106.83 sq mi)
- Elevation: 25 m (82 ft)

Population (2020)
  - County-level city: 871,214
  - Density: 556.33/km^{2} (1,440.9/sq mi)
  - Urban: 529,170
- Time zone: UTC+08:00 (China Standard)
- Website: http://www.hbdaye.gov.cn/

Daye (Chinese: 大冶; pinyin: Dàyě) is a county-level city in eastern Hubei province, China. It is under the administration of the Huangshi prefecture-level city.

As it is usually the case with county-level cities, Daye includes both an urban core and a fair amount of rural land in all directions, with smaller townships (zhen) such as Dajipu (大箕铺). As of 2020, Daye spans an area of 1,566 square kilometres (605 mi^{2}), and has a population of about 871,214 residents. The city is made up of 18 township-level divisions.

The Daye Lake south of Daye's urban core is surrounded by parks and fishing ponds, and is a popular place for recreation.

For a traveler who goes on G316 from Wuhan toward the south-east, Daye appears as a border between the more urban and more rural parts of the province. Daye sits on the south-eastern border of the heavily industrialized Wuhan/Ezhou/Huangshi metropolitan area; south of it, the much more rural Yangxin County begins.

== Toponymy ==
The city's name means "great smelter" (大冶), referencing the metal smelting which took place in the area dating back to the Tang dynasty.

== History ==
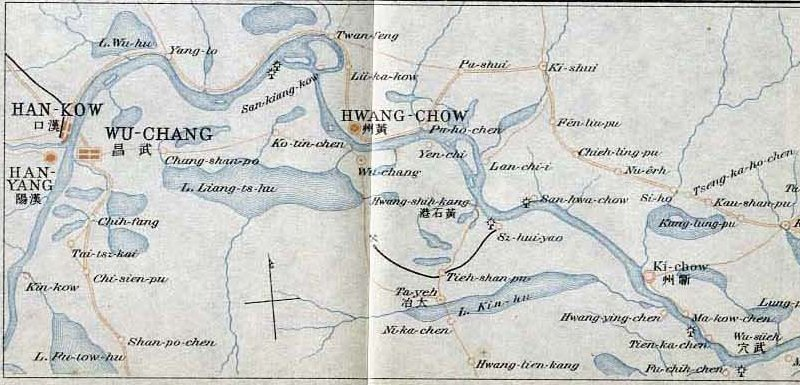
Ta-yeh (Daye) and Tie-shan-pu (Tieshan) shown in the middle of this 1915 map, along with an early railway. Lake Daye south of town is labeled as L. Kin-hu (i.e. Jinhu, "Golden Lake")

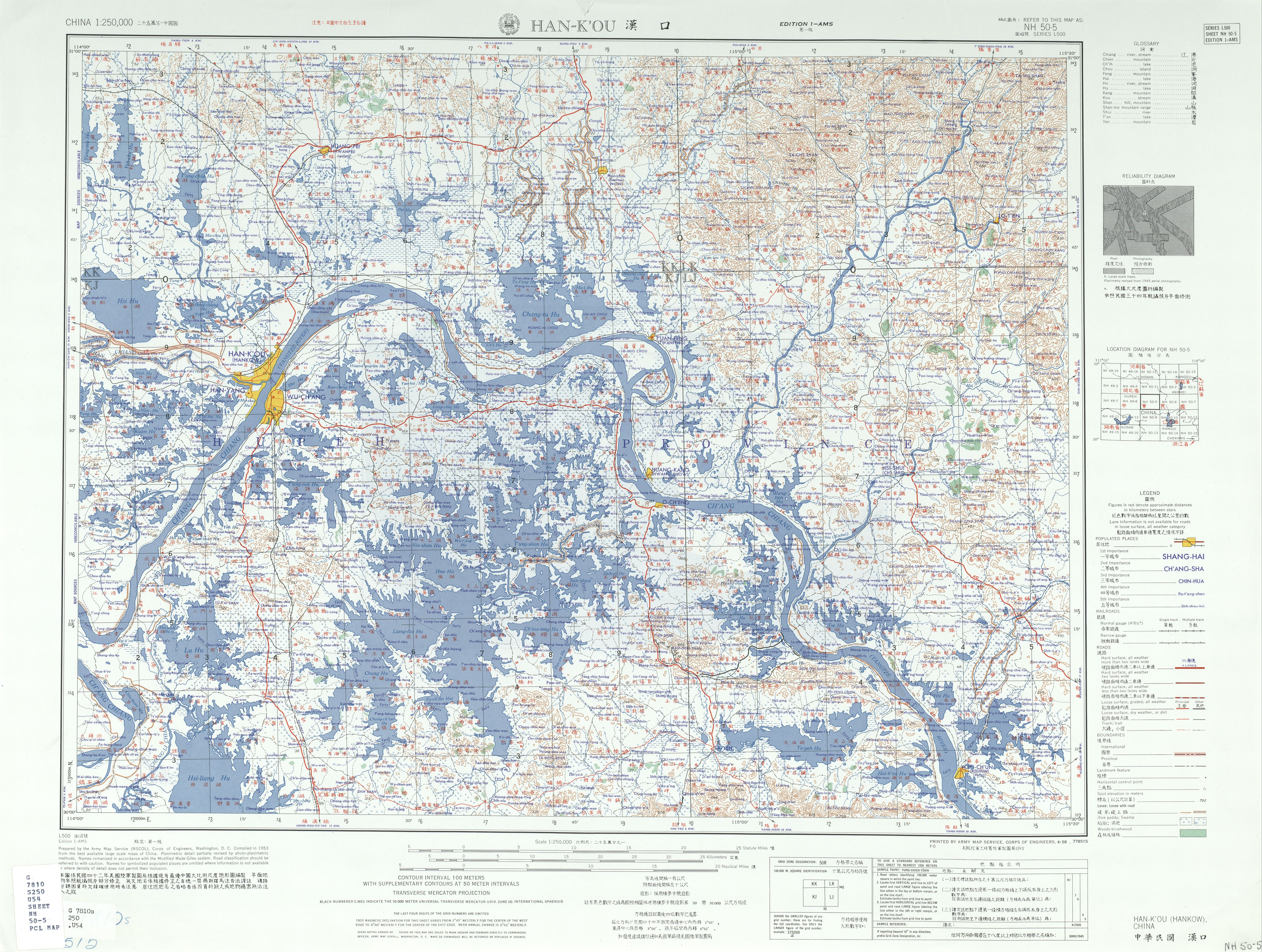
Map including Daye (labeled as TA-YEH 大冶) (1953)

During the Yin and Shang dynasties, the area of present-day Daye belonged to the ancient province of Jingzhou.

In 887 BCE, the area was incorporated as part of the Chu state.

During the Qin dynasty, the area belonged to the Nan Commandery as E County.

In the Han dynasty, E County was transferred to Jiangxia Commandery, where the area remained until the Three Kingdoms period, when it was transferred to Wuchang Commandery.

During the Tang dynasty, the area of present-day Daye was governed by Ezhou, which it remained under until the Yuan dynasty. It was during the Tang dynasty that historical records suggest metal smelting began in the area.

Daye gained great importance during the 1890s, when the city began producing iron en masse for the nascent Chinese railroad industry, a major hub of which was located shortly down the Yangtze River in Hankou. Despite the struggles of various mines and enterprises in Daye from the 1890s onwards through the early 20th century, Daye benefitted from its status as China's only major iron mining area. By the 1930s, this status was eroded by large-scale iron production in Japanese-occupied Manchuria.

As recently as the World War II period, Daye included much of today's prefecture-level city of Huangshi. This means that pre-1949 references to a location in "Daye" or "Tayeh" may refer to anywhere within today's Huangshi.

=== People's Republic of China ===
Daye was taken by the People's Liberation Army in May 1949, and the area was re-organized as Daye Prefecture in October the same year.

Daye Prefecture was abolished in 1952, and merged into Huanggang Prefecture, and in 1959, Daye County was abolished and merged into the city of Huangshi. During the 1950s, the area began producing steel, and began producing much iron and steel to be used in the nearby industrial hub of Wuhan.

Daye County was re-established in June, 1962, as part of Huangshi. On February 18, 1994, the State Council approved the conversion of Daye into a county-level city, which went into effect on January 1, 1995.

== Geography ==
Daye is located to the north of the Mufu Mountains, and has a largely hilly terrain. Daye's lowest point is 11 metres (36 ft) above sea level, and the city's highest point is 839.19 metres (2,753.2 ft) above sea level, although most of the city's terrain is between 120 metres (390 ft) to 200 metres (660 ft) above sea level.

Daye is also home to many swamps, rivers, and lakes.

=== Climate ===
Daye has a humid subtropical climate, with distinct temperature changes and dry and wet seasons. The city's average annual temperature is 17.5 °C (63.5 °F), with July being its hottest month with an average temperature of 29.4 °C (84.9 °F), and January being its coldest month with an average temperature of 4.7 °C (40.5 °F). The city experiences an average annual precipitation of 1,495.2 millimetres (58.87 in), and averages 139.7 days with precipitation per year.

Climate data for Daye, elevation 40 m (130 ft), (1991–2020 normals, extremes 1981–present)
Month	Jan	Feb	Mar	Apr	May	Jun	Jul	Aug	Sep	Oct	Nov	Dec	Year
Record high °C (°F)	20.5 (68.9)	29.9 (85.8)	37.0 (98.6)	35.0 (95.0)	37.3 (99.1)	38.2 (100.8)	40.5 (104.9)	40.6 (105.1)	38.9 (102.0)	37.7 (99.9)	29.6 (85.3)	22.8 (73.0)	40.6 (105.1)
Mean daily maximum °C (°F)	8.3 (46.9)	11.4 (52.5)	16.1 (61.0)	22.6 (72.7)	27.3 (81.1)	30.2 (86.4)	33.5 (92.3)	33.0 (91.4)	29.0 (84.2)	23.6 (74.5)	17.3 (63.1)	11.0 (51.8)	21.9 (71.5)
Daily mean °C (°F)	4.9 (40.8)	7.6 (45.7)	11.9 (53.4)	18.0 (64.4)	22.9 (73.2)	26.1 (79.0)	29.4 (84.9)	28.7 (83.7)	24.7 (76.5)	19.0 (66.2)	12.9 (55.2)	7.0 (44.6)	17.8 (64.0)
Mean daily minimum °C (°F)	2.3 (36.1)	4.7 (40.5)	8.6 (47.5)	14.2 (57.6)	19.2 (66.6)	23.0 (73.4)	26.1 (79.0)	25.4 (77.7)	21.4 (70.5)	15.6 (60.1)	9.7 (49.5)	4.1 (39.4)	14.5 (58.2)
Record low °C (°F)	−5.7 (21.7)	−5.9 (21.4)	−0.9 (30.4)	4.2 (39.6)	10.1 (50.2)	13.6 (56.5)	18.7 (65.7)	17.6 (63.7)	13.2 (55.8)	4.4 (39.9)	−1.8 (28.8)	−7.5 (18.5)	−7.5 (18.5)
Average precipitation mm (inches)	71.0 (2.80)	87.4 (3.44)	122.9 (4.84)	164.6 (6.48)	179.6 (7.07)	250.7 (9.87)	230.1 (9.06)	143.9 (5.67)	86.9 (3.42)	68.1 (2.68)	68.9 (2.71)	44.0 (1.73)	1,518.1 (59.77)
Average precipitation days (≥ 0.1 mm)	11.4	12.0	14.7	13.6	13.7	14.1	13.5	11.9	9.2	9.6	9.8	8.8	142.3
Average snowy days	4.0	1.9	0.5	0	0	0	0	0	0	0	0.2	1.3	7.9
Average relative humidity (%)	76	75	75	74	74	78	76	77	75	74	74	73	75
Mean monthly sunshine hours	83.5	90.2	112.5	143.1	158.7	146.1	195.6	193.2	160.4	143.5	124.9	111.6	1,663.3
Percentage possible sunshine	26	28	30	37	37	35	46	48	44	41	40	35	37
Source: China Meteorological Administration all-time October record

== Administrative divisions ==
As of 2020, Daye administers 5 subdistricts, 10 towns, 1 township, and 2 other township-level divisions.

=== Subdistricts ===
The city's 5 subdistricts are Dongyue Road Subdistrict, Dongfeng Road Subdistrict, Jinhu Subdistrict, Luojiaqiao Subdistrict, and Jinshan Subdistrict.

=== Towns ===
The city's 10 towns are Jinniu, Bao'an, Lingxiang, Jinshandian, Haidiqiao, Yinzu, Liurenba, Chengui, Dajipu, and Wangren.

=== Townships ===
The city's sole township is Mingshan Township.

=== Other township-level divisions ===
The city also administers the Dongfeng Farm Management Area (Chinese: 东风农场管理区) and the Siguzha Management Department (Chinese: 四顾闸管理处).

== Demographics ==
Daye's population is largely Han Chinese, with just 830 residents belonging to China's recognized ethnic minorities. These ethnic minorities comprise 27 different ethnic groups, with major ethnicities being the Tujia, Zhuang, Manchu, Miao and Hui people. In recent years, many ethnic minorities have moved to Daye seeking economic opportunities, and thus, largely reside in the city's urban areas.

== Economy ==
=== Industry ===
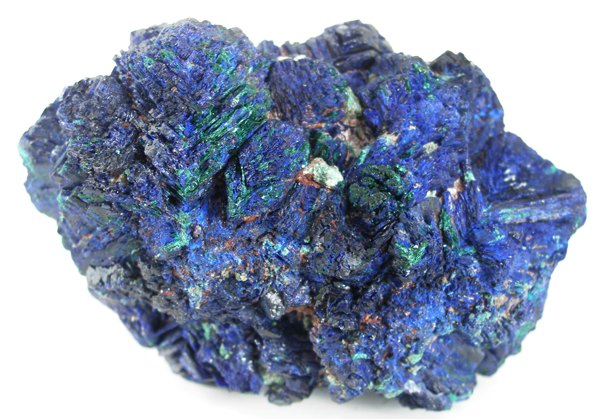
Azurite-malachite from Daye's Tongshankou Mine

Daye is an industrial center, particularly in regards to mining and metallurgy. In addition to iron and steel industries, large amounts of copper and coal are mined in the region. Daye's coal power plants provide a major source of electricity for large cities in the region, such as Huangshi and Wuhan.

Copper mining and smelting was conducted at Daye's Tonglüshan Mine (30°04′52″N 114°56′07″E) as early as the Spring and Autumn period (6th century B.C.E.), if not earlier. Tonglüshan Mine is located just southwest of the modern city, and now has a museum.

Although such copper-containing minerals as malachite and azurite are found here, the local ores are richer in iron than in copper, and the modern Daye is better known for its iron ore mining and processing.

Among the major employers is Huangshi Daye Non-ferrous Metals Co., Ltd.

Daye is also home to a large fertilizer plant, and a number of textile mills which use locally grown cotton.

=== Agriculture ===
Common crops grown in Daye include rice, wheat, sweet potato, maize, soybean, peas, mung bean, rapeseed, peanut, sesame, ramie, and cotton. Daye is also home to large amounts of domesticated animals, such as pigs, cows, sheep, dogs, chickens, ducks, geese, and pigeons.

=== Tourism ===
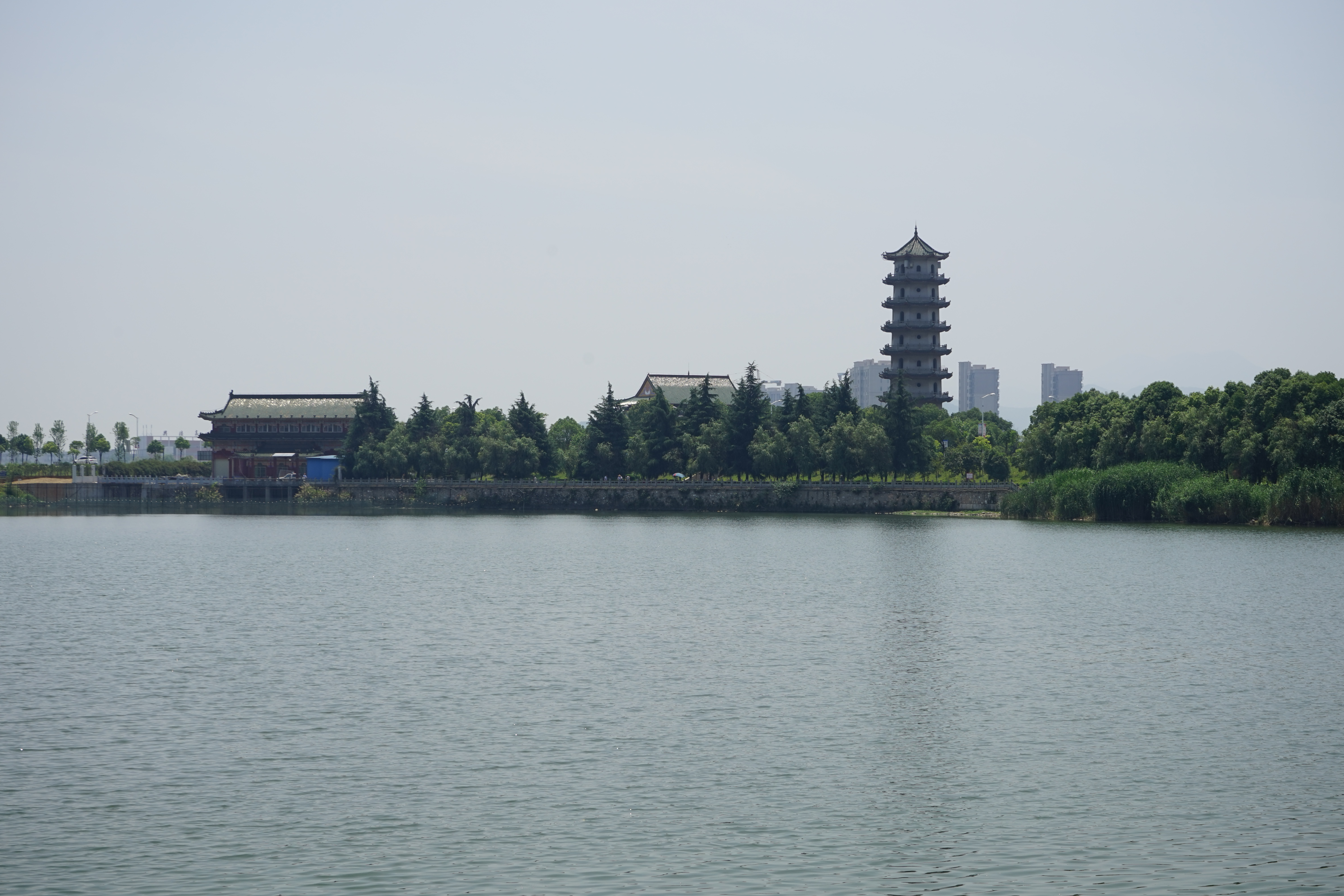
Qinglongshan Pagoda.

The city is home to a number of major tourist attractions, including historic sites such as the Tonglüshan Mine and the Ewang City Site (Chinese: 鄂王城城址), natural sites such as the AAAA-rated Leishan Scenic Area (Chinese: 雷山景区), and red tourism sites such as Nanshantou Revolutionary Memorial Hall (Chinese: 南山头革命纪念馆).

== Transportation ==
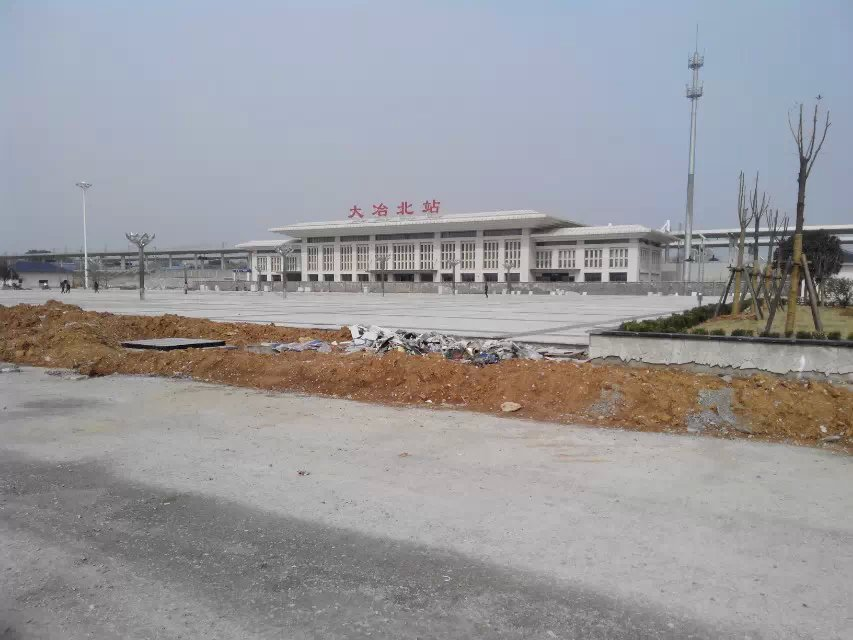
The newly built Daye North Railway Station

Daye was the junction of the Wuhan-Daye Railway (completed in 1958) and Daye-Shahejie Railway (completed in 1987), which merged in 1989 to form the Wuhan–Jiujiang Railway. Huangshi Railway Station, which is the main passenger station for the entire Huangshi metropolitan area, is located within Daye's administrative borders, about 6 km (3.7 mi) north of downtown Daye (30°9′23″N 114°56′5″E). It has fairly frequent service, with travel time to Wuhan being typically around 1 hour on a high-speed D-series train, or 1.5 hours on a "conventional" passenger train.

== Dialect ==
The speech of Daye and the adjacent counties farther south (toward the Jiangxi border) has been traditionally characterized as the Daye dialect, part of the Datong dialect group of Gan Chinese.
