= Yangxin County, Hubei =

Yangxin 阳新县 Yangsin
- County
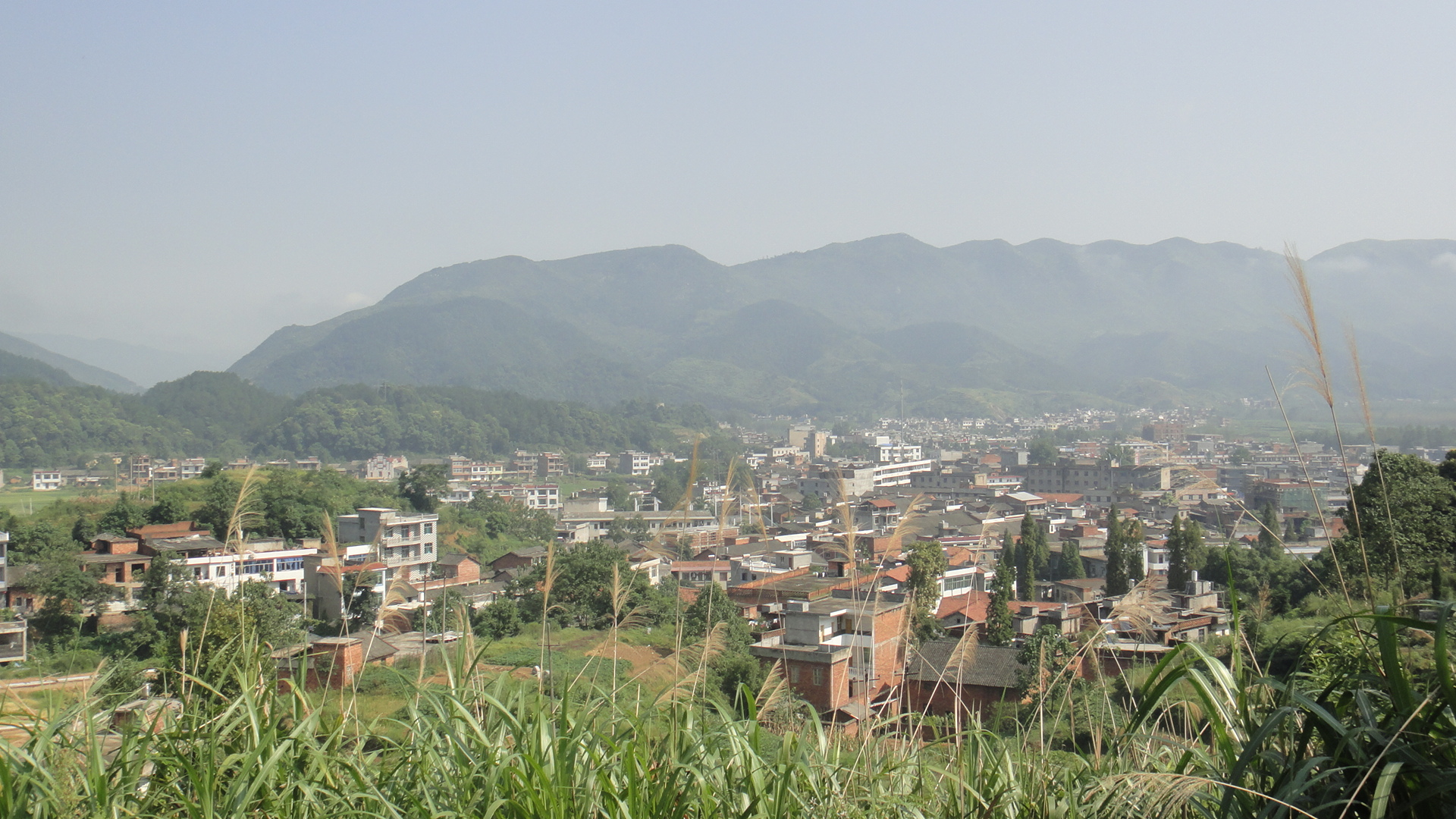
- Longgang Town in Yangxin County

- Location in Hubei
- Coordinates (Yangxin County government): 29°49′49″N 115°12′55″E
- Country: People's Republic of China
- Province: Hubei
- Prefecture-level city: Huangshi

Area
  - Total: 2,773 km^{2} (1,071 sq mi)

Population (2020 census)
  - Total: 901,971
  - Density: 325.3/km^{2} (842.4/sq mi)
- Time zone: UTC+8 (China Standard)
- Website: www.hbyxx.gov.cn (in Chinese)

Yangxin County (simplified Chinese: 阳新县; traditional Chinese: 陽新縣; pinyin: Yángxīn Xiàn) is a county within the prefecture-level city of Huangshi in southeastern Hubei province, People's Republic of China. The county is mostly rural but is more prosperous than its neighbor, Tongshan County. According to the Fifth Population Census of China (2000), the county's population was 949,102 giving it a population density of 341 people per square kilometer.

== History ==
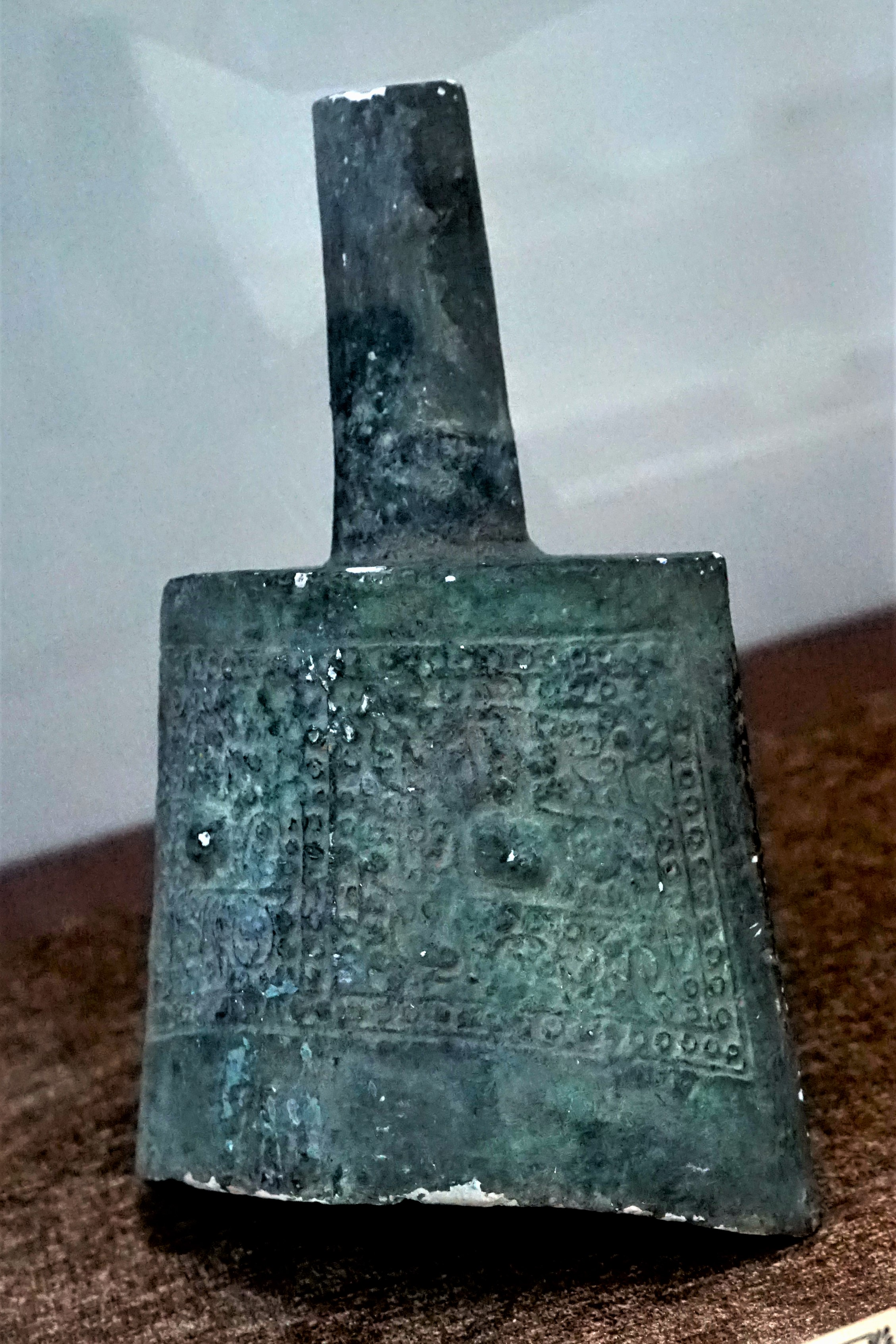
Bronze Nao. Shang dynasty. Unearthed from Liurongshan Village, Baisha Town.

Yangxin has seven neolithic sites and eight Shang-Zhou dynasties sites. In 201 BC, the county was built as Xiazhi (下雉); the name "Yangxin" first appeared during the Jin dynasty.

From the Northern and Southern dynasties period, Hubei province became a noteworthy tea-producing area. It became Xingguo Army (兴国军) during the Song dynasty. During this period, Confucian schools were introduced into Xingguo. In the Yuan dynasty, it was called Xingguo Road and had the biggest silver production among all roads in Hubei. During the Qing dynasty the Yangxin area became Xingguo Prefecture.

In the late Qing dynasty, Yangxin County served as the headquarters for the west march of Taiping Heavenly Kingdom. The prefecture was turned into a county in 1912 and changed its name to Yangxin County in 1914. In 1926, a Chinese Communist Party (CCP) committee was established, and Yangxin became a center of CCP activities in Southeast Hubei. In the Second Sino-Japanese War, the people of Yangxin formed four counter-Japanese base areas and fought the Battle of Wuhan in order to protect Wuhan. Yangxin was occupied by the 43rd Army, 15th Legion, Fourth Field Army of the People's Liberation Army on May 16, 1949.

== Administrative divisions ==
Township-level divisions:

- Xingguo (兴国镇), Fuchi (富池镇), Huangsangkou (黄颡口镇), Weiyuankou (𣲗源口镇 (韦源口镇)), Taizi (太子镇), Dawang (大王镇), Taogang (陶港镇), Baisha (白沙镇), Futu (浮屠镇), Sanxi (三溪镇), Longgang (龙港镇), Yanggang (洋港镇), Paishi (排市镇), Mugang (木港镇), Fenglin (枫林镇), Wangying (王英镇)

== Geography ==
Yangxin county occupies the southern half of the Huangshi City, bordering on Jiangxi in the south, with Tongshan County in the west. The Yangtze River flows along the county's eastern border.

The southern part of the county, located in the foothills of the Mufu Mountains, is riddled with many small hills.

The county's main urban area is Xingguo Town—usually referred to simply as Yangxin, as is normally the case in Chinese counties. Other large towns include Longgang (龙港) and Futu (浮屠).

== Climate ==
Climate data for Yangxin, elevation 57 m (187 ft), (1991–2020 normals, extremes 1981–present)
Month	Jan	Feb	Mar	Apr	May	Jun	Jul	Aug	Sep	Oct	Nov	Dec	Year
Record high °C (°F)	19.8 (67.6)	29.0 (84.2)	36.2 (97.2)	35.7 (96.3)	37.2 (99.0)	38.8 (101.8)	40.8 (105.4)	41.4 (106.5)	39.3 (102.7)	40.6 (105.1)	30.4 (86.7)	22.3 (72.1)	41.4 (106.5)
Mean daily maximum °C (°F)	8.6 (47.5)	11.4 (52.5)	15.8 (60.4)	22.5 (72.5)	27.5 (81.5)	30.2 (86.4)	33.8 (92.8)	32.9 (91.2)	29.0 (84.2)	24.0 (75.2)	17.5 (63.5)	11.4 (52.5)	22.1 (71.7)
Daily mean °C (°F)	5.0 (41.0)	7.6 (45.7)	11.6 (52.9)	17.8 (64.0)	22.9 (73.2)	26.2 (79.2)	29.6 (85.3)	28.7 (83.7)	24.8 (76.6)	19.4 (66.9)	13.1 (55.6)	7.3 (45.1)	17.8 (64.1)
Mean daily minimum °C (°F)	2.2 (36.0)	4.7 (40.5)	8.4 (47.1)	14.3 (57.7)	19.3 (66.7)	23.1 (73.6)	26.4 (79.5)	25.7 (78.3)	21.7 (71.1)	16.0 (60.8)	9.8 (49.6)	4.2 (39.6)	14.7 (58.4)
Record low °C (°F)	−5.2 (22.6)	−5.2 (22.6)	−1.2 (29.8)	3.0 (37.4)	9.7 (49.5)	13.8 (56.8)	18.6 (65.5)	18.5 (65.3)	12.8 (55.0)	3.7 (38.7)	−1.1 (30.0)	−9.5 (14.9)	−9.5 (14.9)
Average precipitation mm (inches)	72.1 (2.84)	85.1 (3.35)	131.1 (5.16)	159.1 (6.26)	174.0 (6.85)	233.3 (9.19)	216.1 (8.51)	146.6 (5.77)	90.9 (3.58)	66.4 (2.61)	68.7 (2.70)	43.7 (1.72)	1,487.1 (58.54)
Average precipitation days (≥ 0.1 mm)	12.0	12.3	14.6	13.8	14.3	14.5	13.4	12.0	8.8	9.3	9.8	9.2	144
Average snowy days	4.4	2.2	0.6	0	0	0	0	0	0	0	0.1	1.6	8.9
Average relative humidity (%)	77	76	76	75	76	79	76	77	76	74	76	74	76
Mean monthly sunshine hours	84.8	86.2	106.1	129.2	147.1	135.8	197.5	192.6	155.1	142.7	121.6	110.5	1,609.2
Percentage possible sunshine	26	27	28	33	35	32	46	48	42	41	38	35	36
Source: China Meteorological Administration all-time October record

== Infrastructure ==
=== Road network ===
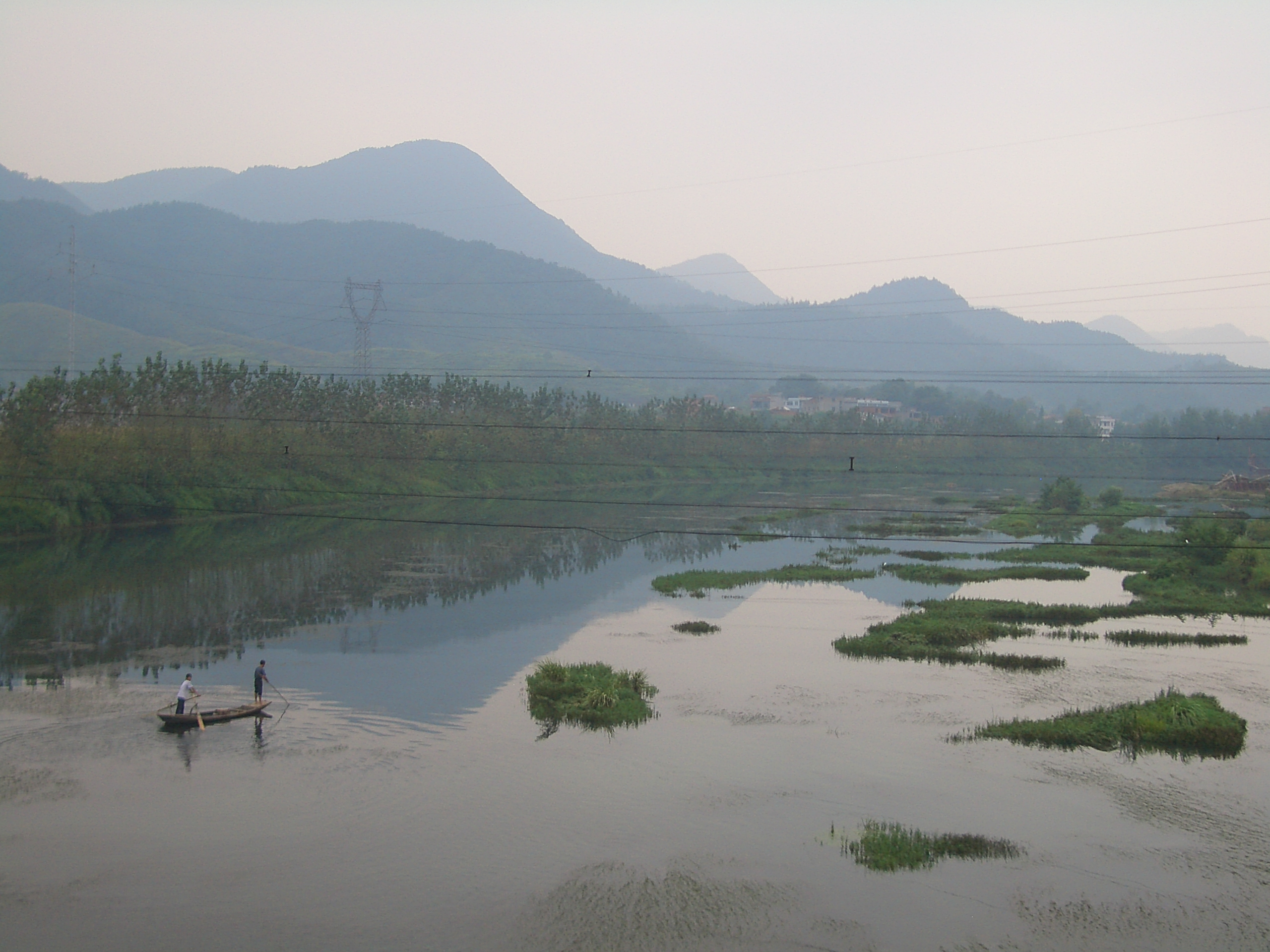
Fushui River

The main transportation artery of the county is China National Highway 106 which is also known as China National Highway 316 within the county. However, it does not pass through the Yangxin county seat, Xingguo town; the town is served by Hubei Provincial Highway 316 (not to be confused with the national highway of the same number).

=== Transport ===
Yangxin railway station is located on the Wuhan–Jiujiang railway, which runs from Wuhan to Jiujiang, Jiangxi. A number of passenger trains running from the Wuchang (or sometimes Hankou) station in Wuhan stop at the Yangxin Railway Station. The distance from the Yangxin station to Wuchang by rail is 153 km (95 mi) and the typical travel time by train is around two hours. The train regularly stops at the Huangshi station, Ezhou, and Huazhong.
