= Sanxi Township, Nanfeng County =

Chinese administrative unit

Sanxi Township (simplified Chinese: 三溪乡; traditional Chinese: 三溪鄉; pinyin: Sānxī Xiāng) is a township-level administrative unit under the jurisdiction of Nanfeng County, Fuzhou City, Jiangxi Province, People's Republic of China.

== Administrative Divisions ==
Sanxi Township administers the following divisions:

Sanxi Village, Shixing Village, Baicang Village, Chifeng Village, Miaoqian Village, Nanbao Village, Baofeng Village, Huanglianshan Village, Pingshang Village, Junfeng Village, Yunshan Village and Shangtan Village.
