= Huangshi =

Huangshi 黄石市 Hwangshih
- Prefecture-level city
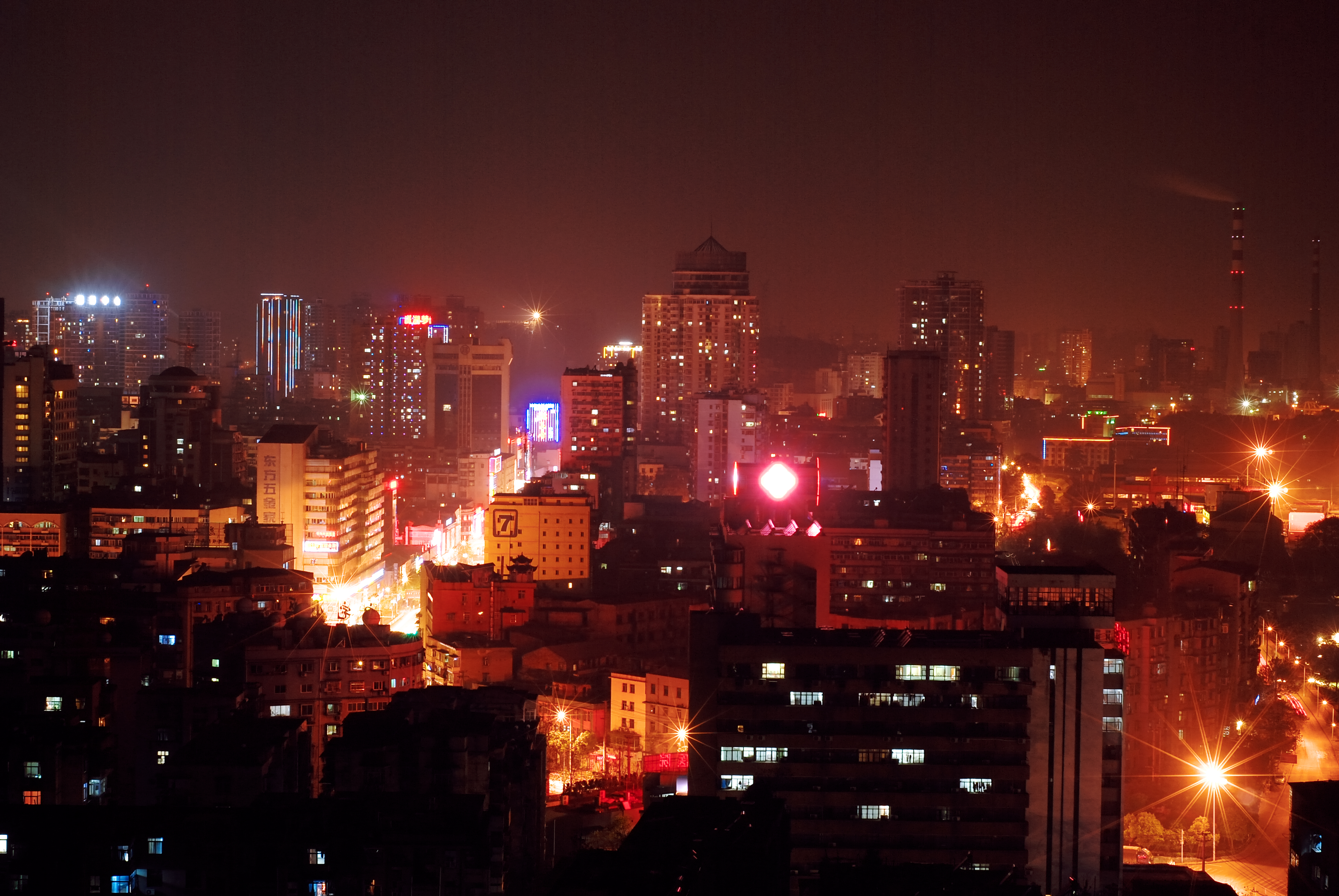
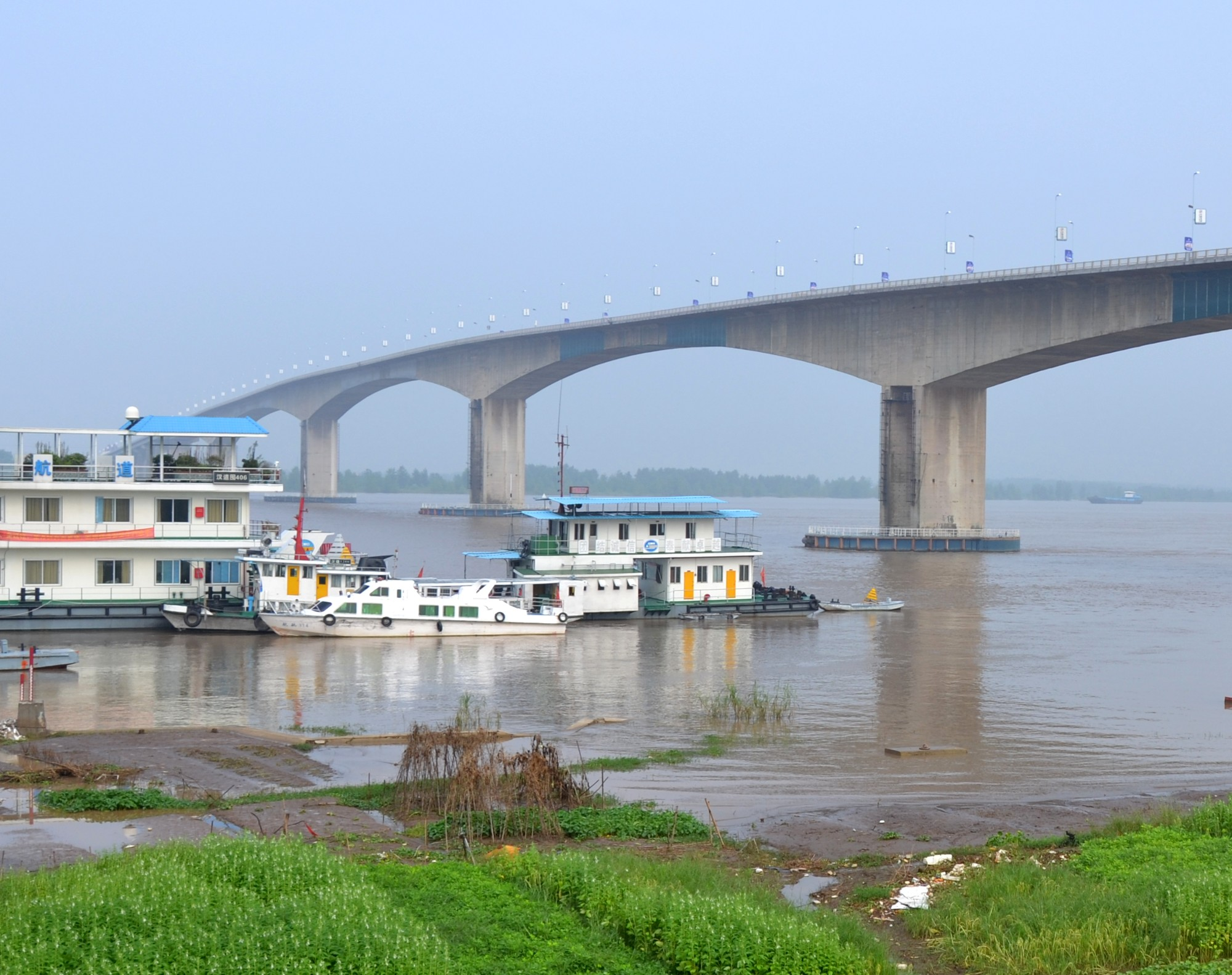
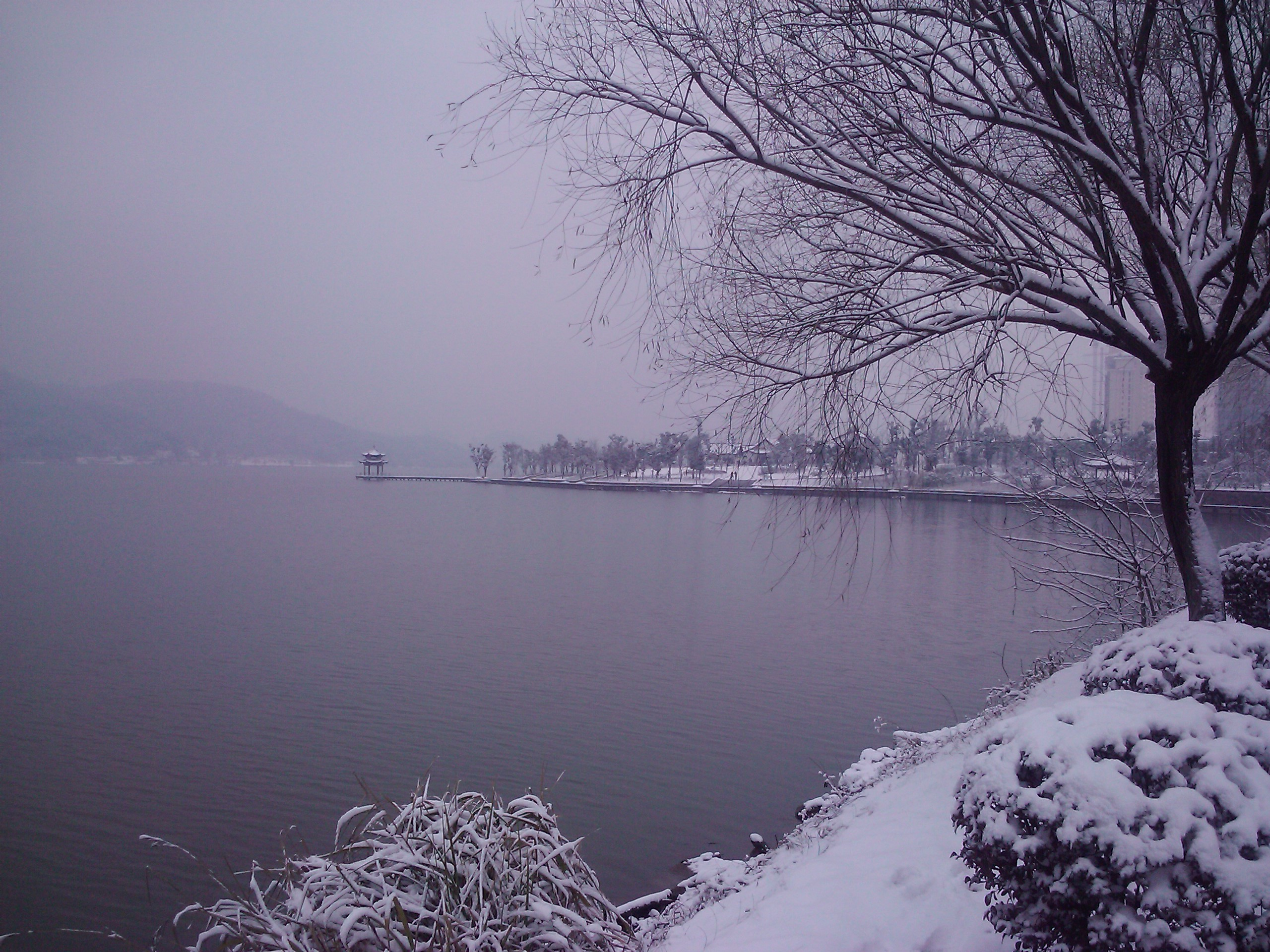
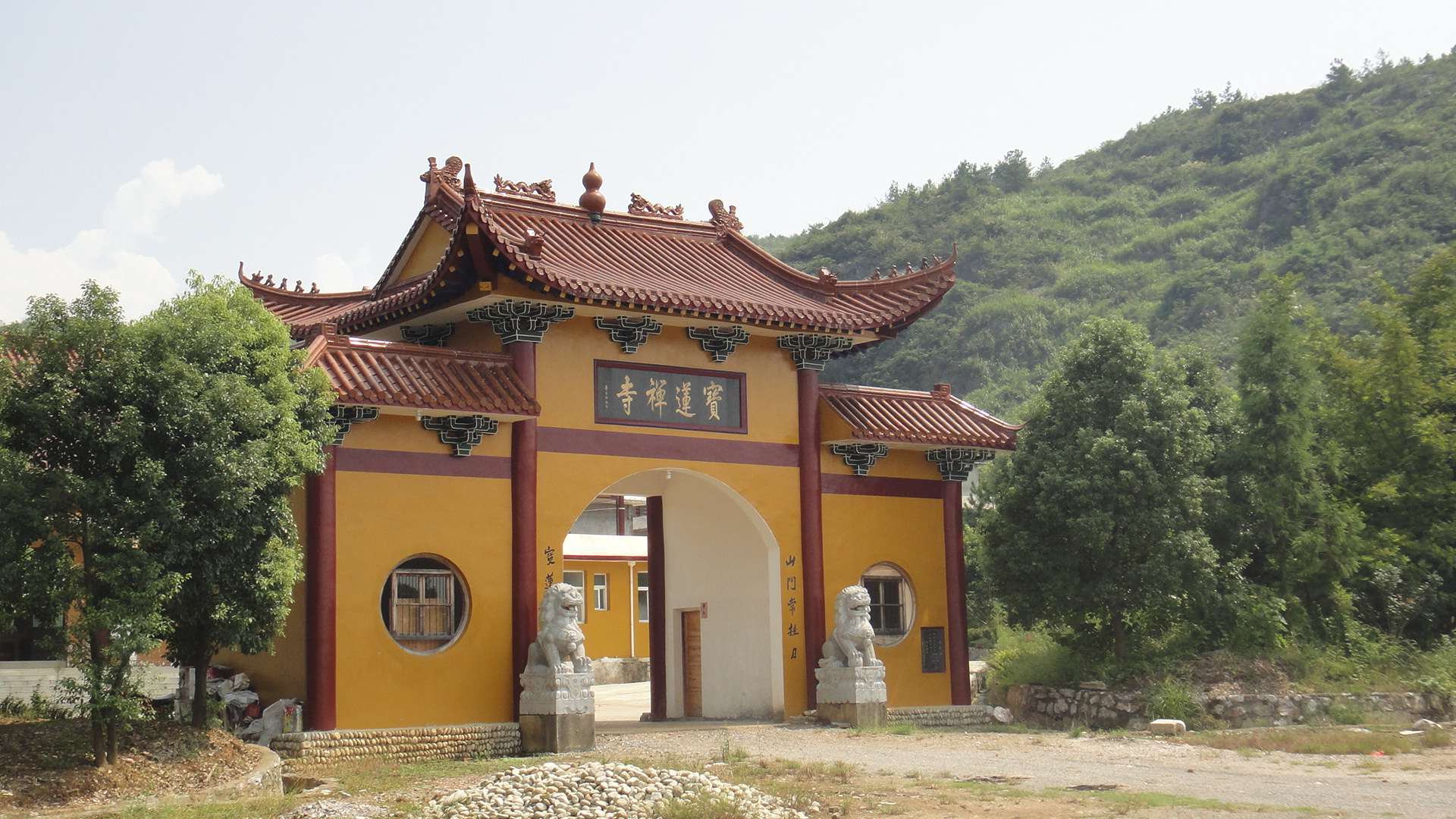
- From top, left to right: Downtown Huangshigang; Huangshibei Railway Station; Huangshi Yangtze River Bridge; Ci Lake in Winter; Po Lin Monastery, Yangxin County

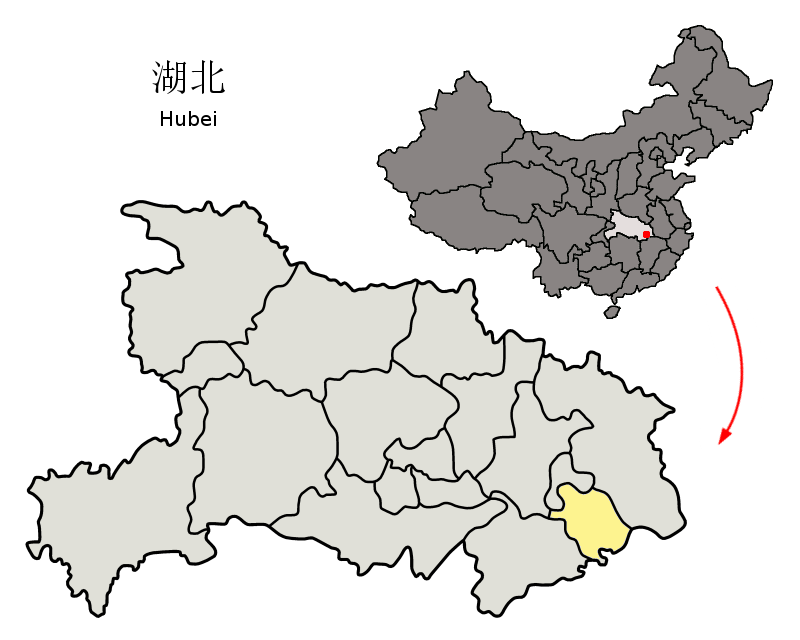
- Location of Huangshi City jurisdiction in Hubei

- Location of the city center in Hubei
- Coordinates (Huangshi Central Hospital (黄石市中心医院)): 30°12′46″N 115°05′04″E
- Country: People's Republic of China
- Province: Hubei
- Municipal seat: Xialu District

Area
  - Prefecture-level city: 4,582.85 km^{2} (1,769.45 sq mi)
  - Urban: 233.80 km^{2} (90.27 sq mi)
  - Metro: 1,800.1 km^{2} (695.0 sq mi)

Population (2020 census)
  - Prefecture-level city: 2,469,079
  - Density: 538.765/km^{2} (1,395.39/sq mi)
  - Urban: 695,894
  - Urban density: 2,976.4/km^{2} (7,709.0/sq mi)
  - Metro: 1,567,108
  - Metro density: 870.57/km^{2} (2,254.8/sq mi)

GDP
  - Prefecture-level city: CN¥ 122.8 billion US$ 19.7 billion
  - Per capita: CN¥ 50,053; US$ 8,036
- Time zone: UTC+8 (China Standard)
- ISO 3166 code: CN-HB-02
- Licence plate prefixes: 鄂B
- Website: 黄石市政府网 (Huangshi City Government Website) (in Simplified Chinese)

Huangshi (simplified Chinese: 黄石; traditional Chinese: 黃石; pinyin: Huángshí), alternatively romanized as Hwangshih, is a prefecture-level city in southeastern Hubei province, People's Republic of China. Its population was 2,469,079 inhabitants at the 2020 census; 1,567,108 of whom lived in the built-up (or metro) area made up of 4 urban districts plus the city of Daye, now being part of the agglomeration.

== History ==
In 845 BC, Marquis Wen (文侯) Huang Meng (黃孟), or Huang Zhang (黃璋) moved the capital of the State of Huang from Yicheng to Huangchuan (present-day Huangchuan, Henan). Huang Xi's descendants ruled State of Huang until 648 BC when it was destroyed by the State of Chu. The Marquis of Huang, Marquis Mu (穆侯) Huang Qisheng (黃企生), fled to the state of Qi. The people of Huang were forced to relocate to Chu. They settled in the region of present-day Hubei province, in a region known as the Jiangxia Prefecture (江夏郡) during the Han dynasty (206 BC-AD 220).

On 9 March 1944, 18 CACW B-25s escorted by 24 P-40s bombed a foundry and floating docks at Huangshi in Hubei. They were intercepted by Japanese fighters from the 25th and 9th Sentai and lost 2 P-40s.

== Geography ==
Huangshi is located in southeastern Hubei province, primarily along the southwestern bank of one of the major bends in the Yangtze River. It is located 100 kilometers (62 mi) southeast of Wuhan, and borders Jiangxi province to the south. Its area was reported by the local government as 4,583 square kilometers (1,770 sq mi); elsewhere, the number of 4,630 square kilometers (1,790 sq mi) was given. The terrain is mostly small mountains and hills. The tallest mountain is 7 Summit Mountain with an elevation of 860 meters (2,820 ft) above sea level. Huangshi is also located in a major lake district between Hunan's Dongting Lake and Jiangxi's Poyang lake and has dozens of large lakes.

=== Climate ===
Huangshi's climate is sub-temperate. Average annual temperature is 17 °C (63 °F) and precipitation is 1,400 mm (55.1 in). There are 264 frost free days. It is possible to see limited snowfall between December and February.

Climate data for Huangshi, elevation 32 m (105 ft), (1991–2020 normals)
Month	Jan	Feb	Mar	Apr	May	Jun	Jul	Aug	Sep	Oct	Nov	Dec	Year
Mean daily maximum °C (°F)	8.6 (47.5)	11.6 (52.9)	16.2 (61.2)	22.7 (72.9)	27.4 (81.3)	30.3 (86.5)	33.5 (92.3)	33.1 (91.6)	29.2 (84.6)	23.7 (74.7)	17.4 (63.3)	11.2 (52.2)	22.1 (71.8)
Daily mean °C (°F)	4.8 (40.6)	7.5 (45.5)	11.9 (53.4)	18.0 (64.4)	22.9 (73.2)	26.2 (79.2)	29.4 (84.9)	28.8 (83.8)	24.8 (76.6)	19.0 (66.2)	12.7 (54.9)	6.9 (44.4)	17.7 (63.9)
Mean daily minimum °C (°F)	2.1 (35.8)	4.5 (40.1)	8.4 (47.1)	14.1 (57.4)	19.0 (66.2)	22.9 (73.2)	25.9 (78.6)	25.4 (77.7)	21.4 (70.5)	15.5 (59.9)	9.4 (48.9)	3.8 (38.8)	14.4 (57.8)
Average precipitation mm (inches)	66.9 (2.63)	82.6 (3.25)	118.3 (4.66)	163.2 (6.43)	174.3 (6.86)	239.7 (9.44)	235.4 (9.27)	141.0 (5.55)	78.2 (3.08)	68.8 (2.71)	63.4 (2.50)	40.0 (1.57)	1,471.8 (57.95)
Average precipitation days (≥ 0.1 mm)	11.1	11.9	14.3	13.3	13.2	13.9	13.2	11.6	7.8	9.2	9.2	8.4	137.1
Average snowy days	3.8	2.1	0.5	0	0	0	0	0	0	0	0.2	1.1	7.7
Average relative humidity (%)	78	77	76	74	75	79	77	77	75	75	77	75	76
Mean monthly sunshine hours	81.1	86.1	111.1	141.4	152.3	138.9	192.3	195.2	157.3	144.4	120.4	109.6	1,630.1
Percentage possible sunshine	25	27	30	36	36	33	45	48	43	41	38	35	36
Source: China Meteorological Administration

== Administration ==
As of 2016, Huangshi had 4 districts, 1 county, and 1 county-level city:

NBS Area No.	Name (from Mand.)	Chinese (Simp.)
420201000000	city-administered area	市辖区
Districts
420202000000	Huangshigang District	黄石港区
420203000000	Xisaishan District	西塞山区
420204000000	Xialu District	下陆区
420205000000	Tieshan District	铁山区
former	Shihuiyao District	石灰窑区
County
420222000000	Yangxin County	阳新县
County-level City
420281000000	Daye	大冶市
Other Areas
-	Huangshi Economic Technology Development District	黄石经济技术开发区

Map
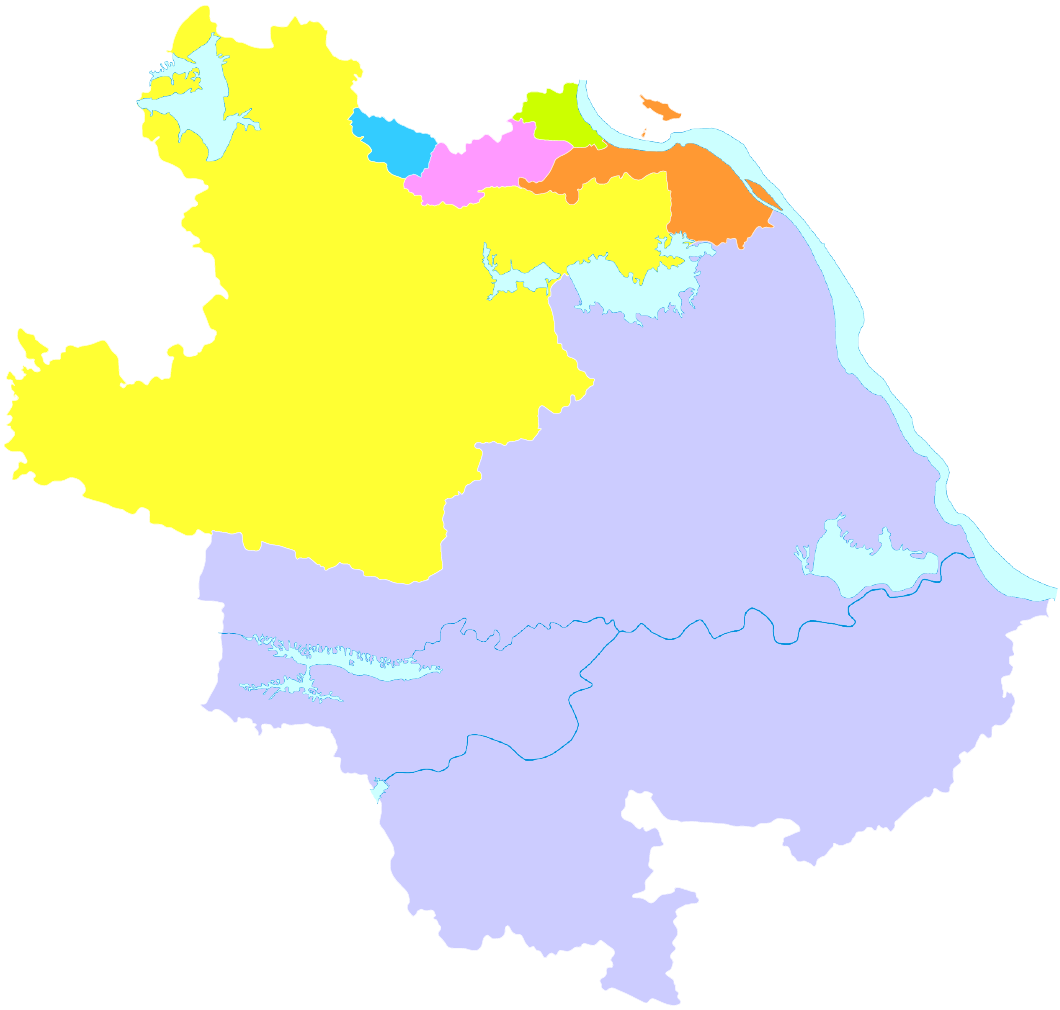

== Demographics ==
According to the Fifth Population Census of China (2000), the entire prefecture-level city of Huangshi had 2,476,400 people, making for the population density of 540 people per square kilometer. More than 99% of the population belong to the Han ethnic group.

According to Google Maps there are 686.894 people in Huangshi; this refers, presumably, to Huangshi's urban core (Huangshigang District 196,600 people, density 5757 people /km^{2}; West Fort Mountain (Xisaishan) Area, 244,000, density 2171 people /km^{2}; Xialu District, 146,600 people, density 2536 people /km^{2}), and excludes the far-flung Yangxin County, Daye, and Tieshan.

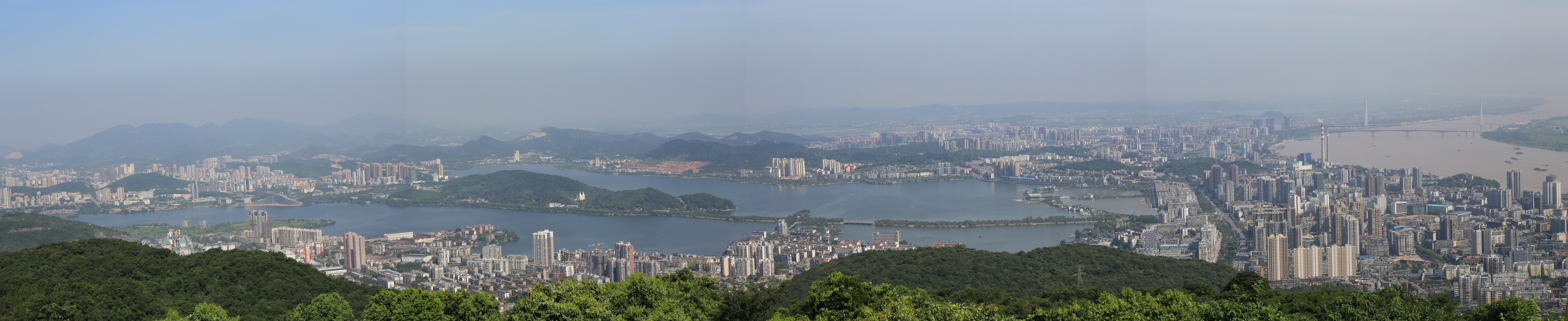
Panorama of the city of Huangshi, Hubei. Taken from Moon Mountain. Cihu Lake on the left, city of Huangshi in the middle, Yangtze River on the right.

== Economy ==
Huangshi's GDP for 2003 was 27.5 billion CNY. Its proximity to Wuhan and location along major rail lines and the Yangtze River make Huangshi an important logistics, distribution, and transportation hub. Mineral resources are plentiful in Huangshi giving it the nickname "The Southern Cornucopia". Metals include iron, manganese, gold, copper, tungsten, molybdenum, zinc, lead, cobalt, silver, gallium, and thallium. Other mineral resources include germanium, indium, selenium, tellurium, sulfur, calcite, limestone, celestine, plaster, and many others.

Agriculture is also a major part of Huangshi's economy. There are more than 3000 species of plants in Huangshi, many of them used for food, pharmaceuticals, and fragrance.

Other industries include metallurgy, textiles, construction materials, energy, light manufacturing, electronics, pharmaceuticals, chemicals, and food processing.

2 of the biggest companies in the city are the Daye Steel Co. Ltd (大冶特钢) and Huaxin Cement Co. Ltd (华新水泥股份有限公司).

== Transportation ==
The Huangshi North Station on the new Wuhan-Huanghshi commuter rail line

The prefecture-level city is served by G45 Daqing–Guangzhou Expressway, G50 Shanghai–Chongqing Expressway, National Highways 106 and 316 and Wuhan–Jiujiang Railway. The city has two Yangtze River crossings, the Huangshi Yangtze River Bridge and the Edong Yangtze River Bridge.

Many of the passenger trains traveling on the Wuhan–Jiujiang Railway between Wuhan (Wuchang and Wuhan Stations) and the points southeast make stops at the Huangshi and Yangxin stations. The Huangshi Station is located within the administrative borders of Daye County-level city (30°9′23″N 114°56′5″E), about 5 km (3 mi) north of downtown Daye and 10 km (6 mi) west of downtown Huangshi. The Yangxin Station is near Yangxin County's county seat, Xingguo Town.

Although Huangshi's main urban area is some distance away from the Wuhan–Jiujiang Railway mainline, it is connected to it by a dead-end branch, of considerable importance for the local industries. It runs all the way to Huangshi's river port on the Yangtze. There was even a downtown passenger station on this branch (Huangshi East Railway Station, 30°12′25″N 115°5′5″E), but, as of 2012, it was served by very few trains, and by 2015, was not in operation anymore.

In 2014, the Wuhan-Huangshi line of the Wuhan Metropolitan Area Intercity Railway opened. The three stations of this commuter rail system in the Huangshi area are Huahu (花湖站), Huangshi North and Daye North. Huahu, although technically situated within the boundaries of Ezhou City, is actually located on the north-western edge of Huangshi's central city (30.263600°N 115.016645°E); Haungshi North is in Xialu District, in the western part of Huangshi's central city; the Daye North station is north-east of Daye (30.125216°N 114.995895°E).

== Tourism ==
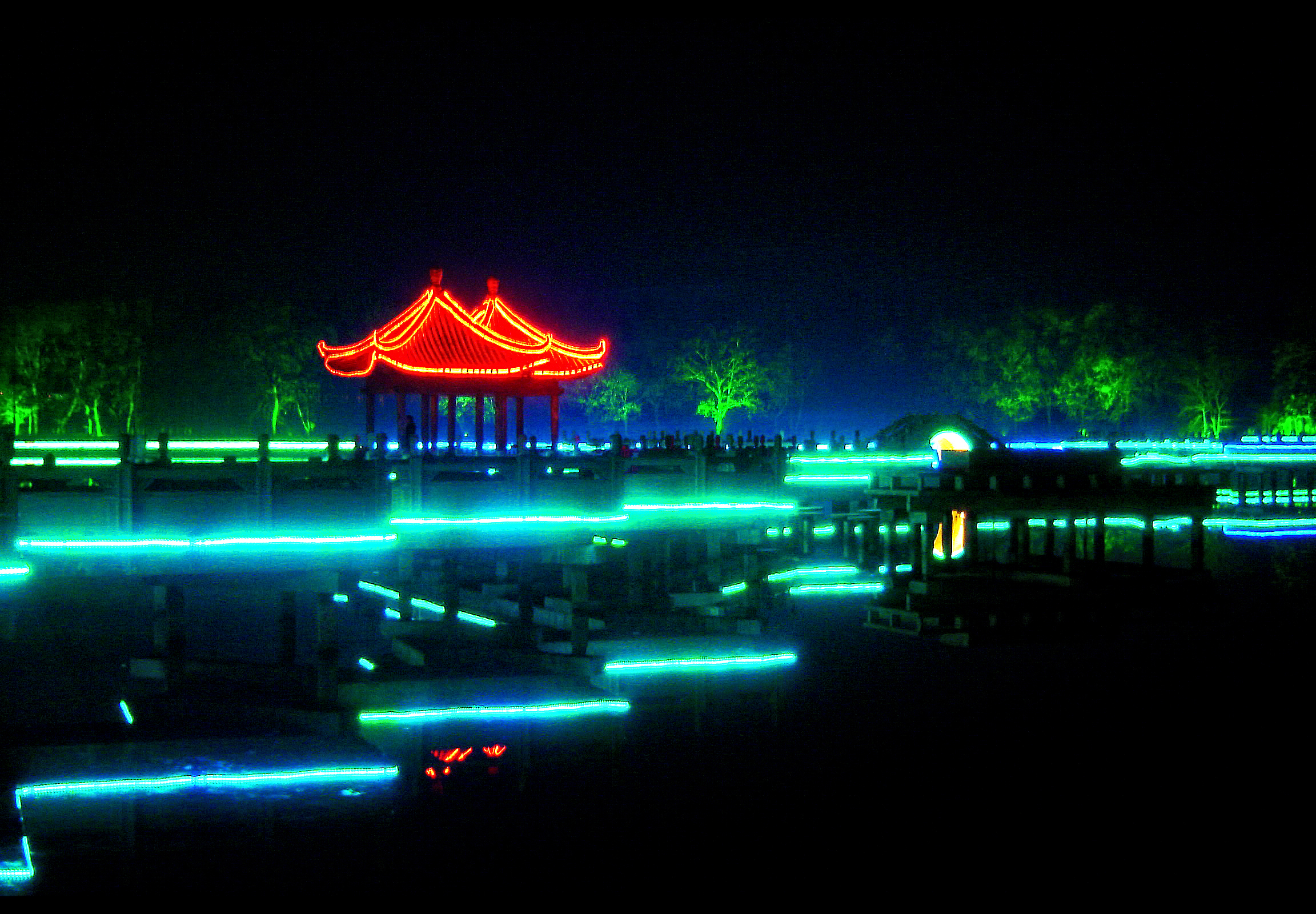
Ci Lake is the northernmost section of the larger Qingshan Lake (青山湖).

Huangshi is situated amongst numerous picturesque lakes and mountains. One of Huangshi's more famous sites is the Buddhist Temple on Dongfang Mountain (东方山风景区; 'East Mountain'), Cihu Lake, Xisaishan, TuanChengShan Park, and Qingshan Lake (青山湖) with connecting Ci Lake.

Cihu Lake with surrounding Cihu Lake Scenery Park (磁湖风景区) separates the older areas of Huangshi to the newer government development zone.

The former eastern pit of the Daye Iron Mine, which operated from the late 1890s until 2000, has been converted into Huangshi National Mining Park (黃石國家礦山公園), where visitors can see a variety of mining equipment from the past and the present.

Xisaishan, located on the south bank of the Yangtze River in the eastern part of the city, provides views of the city and Yangtze River below (considered a 3A class tourist attraction).

The Old Site of Huaxin Cement Plant (华新水泥旧址), which selected as the first batch of China's 20th century Architectural Heritage List. Led by the government and invested and operated by the City Development Group, it was built into Huaxin 1907 Cultural Park. Huaxin Cement is one of the earliest Chinese cement enterprises.

== Notable people ==
- Chen Shu, actress
- Cheng Fei, gymnast
- He Xiaopeng, entrepreneur
- Huang Zhe, rower
- Ke Hua, canoeist
- Ke Zhao, footballer
- Li Shanshan, gymnast
- Ling Tai, actress
- Liu Yun, footballer
- Ma Liuming, painter
- Shi Zhenglu, lieutenant general in the People's Liberation Army
- Tang Anqi, singer
- Wei Guangqing, painter
- Yin Congyao, footballer
- Yu Yangyi, Chess grandmaster
- Zhan Jian, Singaporean table tennis player
- Zhang Yongjun, basketball coach and former player
- Zhang Yuqi, singer
- Zheng Kaimu, footballer
