= List of prisons in Hubei =

This is a list of prisons within Hubei province of the People's Republic of China.

Name	Enterprise name	City/County/District	Village/Town	Established	Notes
Caidian Prison		Caidian District, Wuhan			
Chenjiashan Prison	Shayang Machine Tool Plant	Jingmen			
Enshi Prison	Limestone Materials Factory, Hongmiao Building Materials Factory, Brickyard, Nanmen Auto Repair Factory	Enshi Tujia and Miao Autonomous Prefecture	Enshi City		Partly in Jinzi Village, originally called Exi Prison
Ezhou Prison		Ezhou	Zelin		350 prisoners in 2003
Jiangbei Prison	Jiangbei Farm, Hubei Hongye Industrial Corporation	Jiangling County, Jingzhou		1951	
Jingzhou Prison	Chujiang Dyeing and Weaving Factory; Auto Repair Factory	Jingzhou			Produces cloth of Jingcheng brand, held more than 1,100 inmates as of April 2006
Hanxi Prison	Wuhan Zhongguang Printing Plant	Jianghan District, Wuhan			
Hanyang Prison	Prov. No. 2 Xinsheng Tile Factory, Electric Fan Factory	Caidian District, Wuhan			Some prisoners are from Hong Kong, Macao or Taiwan
Hongshan Prison					
Huangshi City Prison					Formerly a Reeducation through labor - labor camp
Huangzhou Prison	Huangzhou Printing Plant, Winery	Tuanfeng County, Huanggang City	Wangjiafang, Fangping		
Provincial Juvenile Offender Detachment Junshan Prison		Caidian District, Wuhan			Is result of a 2002 merger, usually holds about 4,000 inmates, of whom about a third are juvenile Laojiao and Laogai inmates
Provincial No. 1 Prison	Wuhan No. 1 Silk Mill	Wuhan		1959	Produces clothing of Three Colored Comforters and Baofeng brands
Qinduankou Prison	Hubei Fine Chemical Co.	Haiyang	Hanmiliang	1951	Also known as Jiangxia Prison
Shayang Changlin Prison	Chemical Fiber Plant; Woven Bag Plant	Shayang County, Jingmen			
Shayang Fanjiatai Prison	Shayang Xinsheng Brickyard	Shayang County, Jingmen			Exports to Taiwan and the United States
Shayang Guandang Prison	Shayang Huangtupo Farm	Shayang County, Jingmen	Guandang	1958	
Shayang Guanghua Prison	Shayang No.2 Farm Brick and Tile Factory; Shayang No.2 Farm; Construction Co.; Guanghuasi Farm				
Shayang Hanjiang Prison		Shayang County, Jingmen			
Shayang Hanjin Prison	Aluminum Goods Factory; Shayang Hanjin Trade and Ind. Ltd. Standard Clothing Plant; Construction Co.	Shayang County, Jingmen			2000 inmates as of 2006
Shayang Hehuayuan Prison	Hehuayuan Prison No.2 Brickyard	Shayang County, Jingmen			
Shayang Liujiaxiang Prison	Liujiaxiang Farm	Shayang County, Jingmen			
Shayang Maliang Prison	Maliang Farm	Shayang County, Jingmen	Maliang		
Shayang Miaozihu Prison	Shayang Miaozihu Farm	Shayang County, Jingmen			
Shayang Pinghu Prison	Hubei Prov. Shayang Chemical General Plant	Shayang County, Jingmen		1957	
Shayang Prison; Administration Branch	Shayang Farm	Shayang County, Jingmen		1952	Has been divided into a number of prisons
Shayang Qibaoshan Prison	Cement Plant	Shayang County, Jingmen			
Shayang Yangji Prison	Horticulture No.2 Fields	Zhongxiang, Jingmen	Jiukou		
Shayang Xiaojianghu Prison	Xiaojianghu Farm	Shayang County, Jingmen		1953	
Shayang Xiongwangtai Prison	Jiangdong Machine Works	Shayang County, Jingmen			
Shayang Zhanghuyuan Prison	Shayang Zhanghuyuan Farm	Shayang County, Jingmen	Lishi		
Wuchang Prison		Wuchang District, Wuhan			Also known as Baishazhou Prison
Wuhan Women's Prison		Wuhan			Houses about 3,000 prisoners
Xiangbei Prison	Xiangbei Farm	Xiangyang District, Xiangfan	Huangji	1953	Among its factories are Xinsheng Brickyard, Xinsheng Glass Works, Xinsheng Plastic Factory
Xiangfan Prison	Xiangyang Machine Tool Factory; Auto Repair Factory; Chemical Plant; Chengguang Foundry	Fancheng District, Xiangfan			The U.S. Customs Service banned importation of machine tool products from this camp.
Xiangnan Prison	Denglin Farm	Yicheng, Hubei	Liushui		
Xianning Prison		Xianning			
Xiaogan Prison		Xiaogan			
Yichang Prison	Sanxia Steel Ball Factory; Xinsheng Automobile Repair; Supply Works	Yichang		1955	In Wujia

== Sources ==
- "Laogai Handbook 2007-2008" (PDF) (in Chinese and English). Washington, D.C.: Laogai Research Foundation. October 2008. pp. 207–228. ISBN 978-1-931550-25-3.
