= Prince of Xing =

Prince of Xing 興王
- Creation date: 1487
- Created by: Chenghua Emperor
- Peerage: 1st-rank princely peerage for imperial son of Ming Dynasty
- First holder: Zhu Youyuan, Prince Xian
- Last holder: Zhu Houcong (the 2nd prince, the later Jiajing Emperor)
- Status: Extinct
- Extinction date: 1521 (absorbed into the crown)
- Seats: Anlu state (安陸州) (nowadays Zhongxiang, Hubei province)

Prince of Xing (Chinese: 興王), was a first-rank princely peerage used during Ming dynasty, the princedom was created by the Chenghua Emperor for his fourth son, Zhu Youyuan. As Zhu Youyuan only survived son, Zhu Houcong was enthroned as Jiajing Emperor, the princedom was absorbed into the crown.

== Generation name / poem ==
As members of this peerage were descendants of Yongle Emperor, their generation poem was:-

"Gao Zhan Qi Jian You, Hou Zai Yi Chang You. Ci He Yi Bo Zhong, Jian Jing Di Xian You"
高瞻祁見祐，厚載翊常由。慈和怡伯仲，簡靖迪先猷

== Members ==
- Zhu Youyuan (1st), the Chenghua Emperor's fourth son. He was made the Prince of Xing by his father on 30 July 1487 and he held the title until his death on 13 July 1519. He claimed his fiefdom which located at Anlu Prefecture in 1494. Before he was posthumously honored as an emperor, his original posthumous name was Prince Xian of Xing (興獻王)
  - Unnamed (7 - 12 Jul 1500), Zhu Youyuan's first son, he died five days after he was born. He was then posthumously bestowed him with the title "Prince Huai of Yue" (岳懷王) in 1525. and renamed "Zhu Houxi" (朱厚熙) on May 1560 by the Jiajing Emperor.
  - Zhu Houcong (2nd), he managed the princedom as Hereditary Prince of Xing as he was mourning for three years for his father's death. The imperial court approved him to succeed the princedom for succeeded the throne from the Zhengde Emperor. Before he enthroned, he had held the title of Prince of Xing for a month (15 Apr - 27 May 1521).

=== Female members ===
- Zhu Youyuan, first Prince of Xing
  - Name unknown (26 Nov 1501 - 16 Apr 1504), Zhu Youyuan's first daughter and full-sister to the Jiajing Emperor. She was posthumously bestowed as a first-rank princess by Jiajing Emperor under the title "Princess Changning" (長寧公主).
  - Name unknown (21 Jul 1503 - 15 May 1512), Zhu Youyuan's second daughter she and half-sister to the Jiajing Emperor. She was posthumously bestowed as a first-rank princess by Jiajing Emperor with the title "Princess Shanhua" (善化公主).
  - Name unknown (died 1525), Zhu Youyuan's third daughter, she was originally held the title of a princess commandery under the title Princess Changshou Comm.(長壽郡主). She was promoted to a first-rank princess (as the imperial sister) in 1523 by the Jiajing Emperor under the title Princess Yongfu (永福公主). She married an Embroidered Uniform Guard name Wu Jinghe (鄔景和; 1508 - 1568). The History of Ming wrongly recorded her as a daughter of the Hongzhi Emperor.
  - Name unknown (1510-1540), Zhu Youyuan's fourth daughter and full-sister to the Jiajing Emperor. She was promoted to the title of first-rank princess by the Jiajing Emperor in 1527 under the title Princess Yongchun (永淳公主).
