= Zhu Youyuan =

Chinese prince (1476–1519)

Zhu Youyuan 朱祐杬
- Prince of Xing
- A hanging scroll portrait of Zhu Youyuan, painted after his posthumous elevation to emperor, as reflected in his imperial robes. National Palace Museum, Taipei.
- Born: 21 July 1476
- Died: 13 July 1519 (aged 42)
- Burial: Xian Mausoleum (in present-day Zhongxiang, Hubei)
- Spouse: Empress Cixiaoxian (m. 1492)
- Issue Detail: Jiajing Emperor
Regnal name
- Emperor Bensheng Huangkao Gongmu Xian (Note: Simplified Chinese: 本生皇考恭穆献皇帝; traditional Chinese: 本生皇考恭穆獻皇帝)
Posthumous name
- Prince Xian (Note: Simplified Chinese: 献王; traditional Chinese: 獻王; pinyin: Xiàn Wáng) → Emperor Xingxian (Note: Simplified Chinese: 兴献帝; traditional Chinese: 興獻帝; pinyin: Xìngxiàn Dì) → Emperor Gongrui Yuanren Kuanmu Chuansheng Xian (Note: Simplified Chinese: 恭睿渊仁宽穆纯圣献皇帝; traditional Chinese: 恭睿淵仁寬穆純聖獻皇帝) → Emperor Zhitian Shoudao Hongde Yuanren Kuanmu Chunsheng Gongjian Jinwen Xian (Note: Simplified Chinese: 知天守道洪德渊仁宽穆纯圣恭简敬文献皇帝; traditional Chinese: 知天守道洪德淵仁寬穆純聖恭簡敬文獻皇帝)
Temple name
- Ruizong (Note: Chinese: 睿宗; pinyin: Ruìzōng)
- House: Zhu
- Father: Chenghua Emperor
- Mother: Lady Shao

Chinese name
- Chinese: 朱祐杬
Transcriptions
Standard Mandarin
- Hanyu Pinyin: Zhū Yòuyuán

Zhu Youyuan (21 July 1476 – 13 July 1519) was a prince of the Ming dynasty of China. He was the fourth son of the Chenghua Emperor and the father of the Jiajing Emperor.

Although Zhu Youyuan never reigned as emperor during his lifetime, the Jiajing Emperor posthumously elevated his father to imperial status after ascending the throne, despite opposition from several court officials. The dispute became known as the Great Rites Controversy. In 1538, the Jiajing Emperor granted his father the temple name Ruizong and the posthumous name Emperor Xian.

== Biography ==
Zhu Youyuan was born on 21 July 1476 as the fourth son of the Chenghua Emperor, the ninth emperor of China's Ming dynasty. His mother, Lady Shao, was one of the Emperor's concubines. The Emperor's two eldest sons died early, and his third son Zhu Youcheng succeeded him as the Hongzhi Emperor. When the Hongzhi Emperor ascended the throne in 1487, he gave Zhu Youyuan the title Prince of Xing (興王).

In 1492, Zhu Youyuan married Lady Jiang, the daughter of an officer of the imperial guard. From 1494, he resided in his estate in Anlu near Zhongxiang, which is now part of Jingmen in Hubei Province. He was a learned and cultured man with an interest in poetry and calligraphy. Zhu Youyuan died on 13 July 1519 and was succeeded by his younger son, Zhu Houcong. He was given the posthumous name of Prince Xian of Xing (興獻王), and buried in the Songlin Mountain, Zhongxiang.

== Posthumous elevation ==
In 1521, the Zhengde Emperor, son and successor of the Hongzhi Emperor, died without an heir. As the late emperor's closest surviving male relative, Zhu Houcong ascended the throne as the Jiajing Emperor. Soon afterward, a major political dispute known as the Great Rites Controversy emerged between the new emperor and court officials led by Grand Secretary Yang Tinghe. For three years, the central issue concerned the posthumous status of Zhu Youyuan. While court officials argued that the Jiajing Emperor, as the adopted son of the Hongzhi Emperor, should continue the main imperial line, the Emperor maintained that he was the son of Zhu Youyuan and sought imperial recognition for his biological father. After a prolonged political conflict, he crushed his opponents in 1524 and formally honored Zhu Youyuan as both his father and an imperial predecessor, thereby establishing a new imperial line that lasted until the fall of the dynasty in 1644.

In 1522, the Emperor first granted his father the title "Emperor Xingxian". Two years later, he further elevated Zhu Youyuan with the honorific title "Emperor Bensheng Huangkao Gongmu Xian", constructed a dedicated shrine for his worship, and accorded him sacrificial rites equivalent to those of the Imperial Ancestral Temple, while his tomb was renamed the Xian Mausoleum. In 1528, his posthumous title was expanded to "Emperor Gongrui Yuanren Kuanmu Chuansheng Xian". The process culminated in 1538, when the Jiajing Emperor bestowed upon him the title "Emperor Zhitian Shoudao Hongde Yuanren Kuanmu Chunsheng Gongjian Jinwen Xian", granted him the temple name Ruizong, and placed his spirit tablet in the Imperial Ancestral Temple above that of the Zhengde Emperor.

Under the Wanli Emperor and Tianqi Emperor, officials repeatedly petitioned for Zhu Youyuan's spirit tablet to be removed from the main ancestral temple and transferred to a secondary sacrificial hall, but these requests were consistently rejected.

== Family ==
- Empress Cixiaoxian (慈孝獻皇后) of the Jiang clan (蔣氏; d. 1538)
  - Zhu Houxi (朱厚熙), Prince Huai of Yue (岳懷王), first son
  - Princess Changning (長寧公主), first daughter
  - Zhu Houcong (朱厚熜), the Jiajing Emperor (嘉靖帝; 1507–1567), second son
  - Princess Yongchun (永淳公主; d. 14 April 1540), fourth daughter. According to Wanli yehuo bian (萬曆野獲編) and Veritable Records of Shizong, she was the daughter of Zhu Youyuan, but the History of Ming mistakenly recorded her as the daughter of the Hongzhi Emperor. Married in 1527 to Xie Zhao (謝詔).
- Consort Wenjingshu (溫靜淑妃) of the Wang clan (王氏; d. 1532)
  - Princess Shanhua (善化公主), second daughter
- Unknown
  - Princess Yongfu (永福公主; d. 20 June 1525), third daughter. According to Wanli yehuo bian (萬曆野獲編) and Veritable Records of Shizong, she was the daughter of Zhu Youyuan, (Note: Wanli yehuo bian, however, recorded Princess Yongfu as the second daughter of Zhu Youyuan.) but the History of Ming mistakenly recorded her as the daughter of the Hongzhi Emperor. Married in 1523 to Wu Jinghe (鄔景和).

== Notes ==
Zhu Youyuan House of Zhu Born: 21 July 1476 Died: 13 July 1519
Chinese royalty
New creation	Prince of Xing; 30 July 1487 – 13 July 1519	Succeeded by Zhu Houcong
