= Lianhe =

Lianhe may refer to:

- Lianhe Zaobao (联合早报), Singapore-based Chinese-language newspaper
- Lianhe Subdistrict, Guangzhou (联和街道), in Luogang District, Guangzhou, China
- Lianhe Subdistirct, Hengyang (联合街道), in Zhengxiang District, Hengyang, Hunan, China
- Lianhe, Wulipu, Shayang, Jingmen, Hubei, China
- Lianhe station, metro station on Line 3 of the Foshan Metro
