= Ergun Banner =

Ergun Banner was a banner of Inner Mongolia existing from 1948 to 1966. It was split into the following 2 banners in 1966 (from 1933 to 1948 there were also 2 separated banners):

- Ergun Left Banner, now known as Genhe City
- Ergun Right Banner, now known as Ergun City
