= Xinshi, Jingshan County =

Xinshi 新市镇
- Town
- Location in Hubei
- Coordinates: 31°01′23″N 113°06′43″E
- Country: People's Republic of China
- Province: Hubei
- Prefecture-level city: Jingmen
- County: Jingshan
- Village-level divisions: 10 residential communities 25 villages
- Elevation: 67 m (220 ft)

Population
  - Total: 143,186
- Time zone: UTC+8 (China Standard)
- Postal code: 431800
- Area code: 0724

Xinshi (Chinese: 新市; pinyin: Xīnshì; lit. 'new city') is a town in and the seat of Jingshan County in Jingmen, east-central Hubei province, China. The towns geographical coordinates are 31° 1' 19" North, 113° 6' 11".

== Administrative divisions ==
As of 2011, it has 10 residential communities (居委会) and 25 villages under its administration.

Communities:

- Yundu (云杜社区), Wenbifeng (文笔峰社区), Zhonggulou (钟鼓楼社区), Sanjiaozhou (三角洲社区), Guihuatai (桂花台社区), Dongguan (东关社区), Chengfan (城畈社区), Xinyang (新阳社区), Fenghuangyan (凤凰堰社区)

Villages:

- Gaochao (高潮村), Wusi (五四村), Shuixiakou (水峡口村), Baigudong (白谷洞村), Hongquan (洪泉村), Yanhao (鄢郝村), Siling (四岭村), Hehuayan (荷花堰村), Dingjiabang (丁家塝村), Gaoling (高岭村), Xiongtan (熊滩村), Chenbazi (陈八字村), Dazhu (大竹村), Tianwang (天王村), Bazimen (八字门村), Shengjing (胜境村), Wangjiaguai (汪家拐村), Longquanshan (龙泉山村), Huolong (火龙村), Xiaohuanling (小焕岭村)

== See also ==
- List of township-level divisions of Hubei
