= ALSV =

ALSV may refer to:

- Alongshan virus, a tick-borne virus
- Chenowth Advanced Light Strike Vehicle, an all-terrain light military vehicle
