= Alongshan town =

Alongshan 阿龙山镇
- Alongshan town
- Interactive map of Alongshan
- Coordinates: 51°41′42″N 121°51′53″E
- Country: China
- Province: Inner Mongolia Autonomous Region
- Province-level city: Hulunbuir
- Prefecture-level city: Genhe

Alongshan (Chinese: 阿龙山镇; pinyin: Ālóngshān zhèn) is a town in Inner Mongolia, China. It is administrated by the county-level city of Genhe under the prefecture-level city of Hulunbuir. The index patient of the tick-borne Alongshan virus came from the town of Alongshan and presented to a county hospital in Hulunbuir. This led the newly-discovered virus to be named after the town.

Alongshan is located on the southwestern part of the Aokeli man made mountain (Oroqen: Aokelitui, lit: Mountain at the Oriental scops owl).

== Administrative divisions ==
Alongshan town has three subdivisions, all of which are residential communities (社区): Zhenxi (镇西), Zhenbei (镇北), and Zhendong (镇东). The names mean "west of town", "north of town", and "east of town" respectively.
