= Jingmen West railway station =

Railway station in Hubei

Jingmen West 荆门西站
- Platforms 2 and 3

General information
- Location: Zhoujiapo, Zhanghe New District, Jingmen City, Hubei; China
- Coordinates: 31°00′10″N 112°06′29″E
- Operator: CR Wuhan Group
- Lines: Wuhan–Yichang HSR; Xiangyang–Jingmen HSR; Jingmen–Jingzhou HSR
- Platforms: 4

History
- Opened: 8 December 2024
Location

Jingmen West station (Chinese: 荆门西站) is located in Zhoujiapo, Zhanghe New District, Jingmen City, Hubei Province, China. It covers an area of about 40,000 m^{2} (430,000 sq ft) and is under the jurisdiction of China Railway Wuhan Group. It is a hub station where the Wuhan–Yichang, Xiangyang–Jingmen and the Jingmen–Jingzhou high-speed railways converge. The station was put into operation at the end of 2024 with the opening of the high-speed railway HSR.

== History ==
Construction of the station began on 3 July 2022. The station was put into operation on 8 December 2024.

== Station structure ==
The station is a side-platform station. The station has 5 platforms and 13 tracks (including 4 main tracks), with an effective length of 650 m (2,130 ft) for arrival and departure tracks. The comprehensive maintenance workshop is located on the left side of the main track towards Wuhan. The station has 5 platforms, each measuring 450 m (1,480 ft) × 12 m (39 ft) × 1.25 m (4 ft 1 in), with canopies the same length as the platforms. It also includes one 12m-wide underpass and one 12m-wide overpass.
