= Xiangyang–Jingmen high-speed railway =

Railway line in Hubei, China

Overview
- Native name: 襄荆高速铁路
- Locale: Hubei, China
- Termini: Xiangyang East; Jingmen West
- Stations: 4

History
- Opened: 28 September 2025

Technical
- Line length: 116.7 km (72.5 mi)
- Number of tracks: 2
- Operating speed: 350 km/h (220 mph)

Xiangyang–Jingmen high-speed railway (Chinese: 襄荆高速铁路), or Xiangyang–Jingmen section of Hohhot–Nanning high-speed railway, is a high-speed railway line in Hubei, China. It will be 116.7 kilometres (72.5 miles) long with a maximum speed of 350 kilometres per hour (220 miles per hour) and four stations.

Construction began in September 2022.

The line began operation on 28 September 2025.

== Route ==
The line will approximately follow the existing Jiaozuo–Liuzhou railway between Xiangyang and Jingmen.

== Stations ==
- Xiangyang East
- Yicheng North
- Shuanghe West
- Jingmen West
