= Jianghan Plain railway =

Railway line in China

The Jianghan Plain railway is a freight-only railway line in the Jianghan Plain, China. It has a length of 120.7 kilometres (75.0 mi) and was constructed as Hubei's priority infrastructure project as stated in the 12th five-year plan.

== History ==
The line opened on 21 December 2018.

== Route ==
The line splits from the Changjiangbu–Jingmen railway east of Tianmen railway station. At Tianmen East railway station, the line splits. One branch heads west to Qianjiang North railway station, while the other heads east to Xiantao East railway station. It comprises a total of 83.5 kilometres (51.9 mi) of track. The Xiantao branch will serve the currently under construction Xiantao Power Station.
