= Duodao, Jingmen =

Duodao 掇刀区
- District
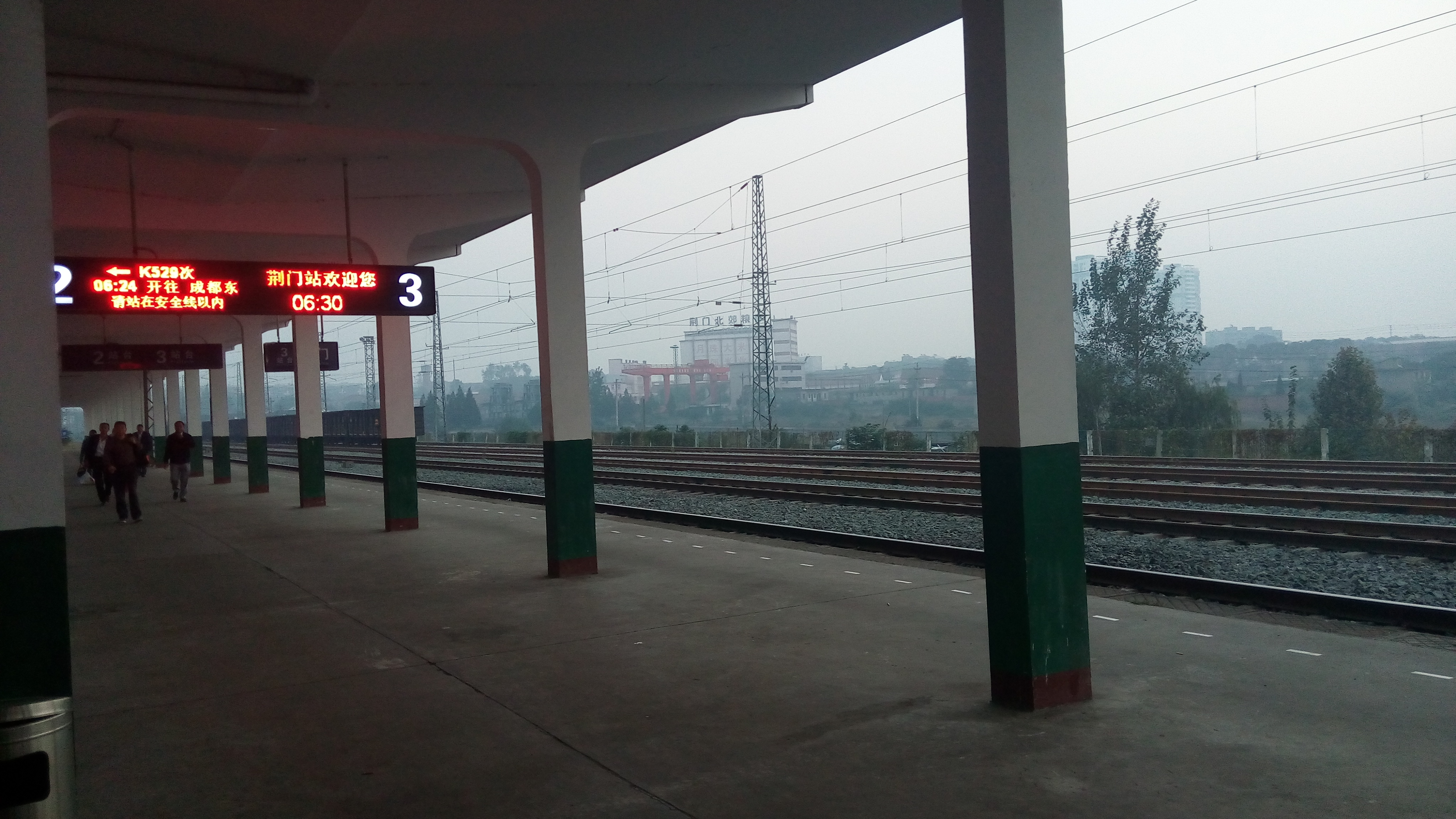
- Jingmen railway station

- Location in Hubei
- Coordinates: 30°58′31″N 112°20′04″E
- Country: People's Republic of China
- Province: Hubei
- Prefecture-level city: Jingmen

Population (2010)
  - Total: 271,970
- Time zone: UTC+8 (China Standard)
- Website: duodao.gov.cn

Duodao District (simplified Chinese: 掇刀区; traditional Chinese: 掇刀區; pinyin: Duōdāo Qū) is a district of the city of Jingmen, Hubei, People's Republic of China.

== History ==
The name 'Duodao' is derived from an incident involving Guan Yu said to have occurred in the area during the Three Kingdoms period. On March 17, 2001, Hechang Township, Macheng Town, Tuanlinpu Town, Duodaoshi Subdistrict and Baimiao Subdistrict, originally part of Dongbao District, were made into Duodao District.

== Administrative divisions ==
Four subdistricts:

- Duodaoshi/Duodao Subdistrict (掇刀石/掇刀街道), Baimiao Subdistrict (白庙街道), Xinglong Subdistrict (兴隆街道), Shuangxi Subdistrict (双喜街道)

Two towns:

- Tuanlinpu (团林铺镇), Macheng (麻城镇)

== Economy ==
Once an array of vegetation and fields, Duodao has developed rapidly over recent years. Apartment buildings and businesses have quickly cropped up and Duodao is soon to be home to Jingmen's first Walmart store.

Duodao is the location of Jingmen Hi-Tech Technology Industrial Park which hosts international companies such as Li Ning, which has its largest distribution centre here.

== Education ==
Duodao is home to some notable schools such as Duodaoshi Middle School (Chinese: 掇刀石中学), Jingmen Special Education School for children with special needs, The Medical School of Jingchu University of Technology (Chinese: 医学院), and Shilipai Primary School (Chinese: 十里牌小学)
