= Xiantao Power Station =

Coal-fired power station in Xiantao, China

Xiantao Power Station (Chinese: 仙桃电厂) is a coal-fired power station currently under construction in Xiantao, Hubei, China. Two 660 MW units are under construction. The first phase is expected to start operation in May 2022.

The power station will be connected to the Jianghan Plain railway.
