= Wulipu =

Wulipu 五里铺镇
- Town
- Location in Hubei
- Coordinates (Wulipu government): 30°44′07″N 112°12′26″E
- Country: People's Republic of China
- Province: Hubei
- Prefecture-level city: Jingmen
- County: Shayang

Area
  - Total: 200.8 km^{2} (77.5 sq mi)

Population (2016)
  - Total: 48,568
  - Density: 241.9/km^{2} (626.4/sq mi)
- Time zone: UTC+8 (China Standard)

Wulipu (Chinese: 五里铺镇; pinyin: Wǔlǐpù Zhèn; lit. 'five Li relay station for post horses') is a town in the northwest corner of Shayang County, Jingmen, Hubei Province, China. The name 'Wulipu' means 'a message relay station (zh:驿站) for post horses five Li away from the city'.

== History ==
In early 1928, elements from the Chinese Communist Party participated in a violent agrarian uprising that erupted in Wulipu's Jinjiahu (靳家湖).

In 2000, a cache of Chu (state) Warring States period funerary artifacts dating to 340-300 BC was unearthed in eastern Wulipu's Zuozhong village during the construction of the G55 Erenhot–Guangzhou Expressway, locally the Xiang(yang)-Jing(zhou) Highway (襄荆高速公路).

In March 2001, Shayang County's Caochang Township (草场乡) was disestablished. The former township became part of western Wulipu.

== Geography ==
Wulipu lies to the north of Shilipu (十里铺镇), and south of Tuanlinpu (团林铺镇).

== Administrative divisions ==
As of 2016, Wulipu comprised 21 village-level divisions including two communities and nineteen villages which were further divided into 250 villager groups and 18 residential groups:

Two residential communities:

- Wuli (五里社区), Caochang (草场社区) (formerly 草场村)

Nineteen villages:

- Zhaoji (赵集村), Xuchang (许场村), Shiling (十岭村), Bailing (白岭村), Yandian (严店村), Yangji (杨集村), Hexin (合心村), Zaodian (枣店村), Jintai (金台村), Liuji (刘集村), Xianling (显灵村), Zuozhong (左冢村), Chenchi (陈池村), Lianghe (两河村), Lianhe (联合村), Baihu (白虎村), Huolong (火龙村), Anquan (安全村), Taochang (陶场村)

== Economy ==
The two major incomes of the town are agriculture and tourism. The government of Shayang is trying to develop a tourism business based on cole flower fields in the area and holds an annual event for those interested in the flowers (油菜花旅游节).

== Demographics ==
Historical population
Year	Pop.	±% p.a.
2000	34,107	—
2010	43,825	+2.54%
2016	48,568	+1.73%
2000 & 2010 (Note: In the Fifth Census of China in 2000, the population of Wulipu was 34,107 while the population of Caochang Township was 18,912. Caochang Township would later be disestablished (2001) and now forms part of Wulipu.), 2016

In 2016, 433 births and 211 deaths were recorded in Wulipu. The birth rate was 8.9‰ and death rate was 4.3‰ resulting in a natural population increase of 4.6‰. In the results of a separate survey published by the Shayang County government, Wulipu's population had increased from 48,044 to 48,132 during a survey period. 424 children were born during the survey period resulting in a birth rate of 8.82‰. During the same period, 63 people died, resulting in death rate of 1.31‰. Of the births in the survey, 406 (95.75%) were in compliance with the family planning policy of China. 312 (73.58%) of the births were the firstborn in the family. (All of these births were in compliance with the family planning policy of China.) Among the firstborn children, 157 were female. 107 (25.24%) of the births were the second-born child in the family. 90 of these births were in compliance with the family planning policy of China. Among the second-born children, 47 were female. Five (1.18%) of the births surveyed were neither the firstborn nor second-born child in the family. Four of these births were in compliance with the family planning policy of China. Among the children born who were neither firstborn nor second-born, two were female.

== Transportation ==
North-South:

- China National Highway 207
- G55 Erenhot–Guangzhou Expressway
- Jiaozuo–Liuzhou railway

East-West:

- X020 (County Highway 20)

== Education ==
Wulipu Central Primary School (五里中心小学), abbreviated "Wuxiao" (五小) is a prominent school in Wulipu.

== See also ==
- List of township-level divisions of Hubei
