= Changjiangbu–Jingmen railway =

Railroad line in Hubei, China

Overview
- Status: Operational
- Termini: Jingmen; Xiaxindian

History
- Opened: 18 March 2005

Technical
- Line length: 176 km (109 mi)

The Changjiangbu–Jingmen railway (Chinese: 长荆铁路) is a railway line that connects the Jiaozuo–Liuzhou railway at Jingmen with the Hankou–Danjiangkou railway at Xiaxindian. It is 176 kilometres (109 mi) long.

Construction on the line began in November 1998. Passenger service was introduced in 2005. Electrification of the line was completed in 2012.

The Jianghan Plain railway splits from the line to the east of Tianmen railway station.
