= Empress Xiaohui (Ming dynasty) =

Chinese empress dowager (d. 1522)

Empress Xiaohui 孝惠皇后
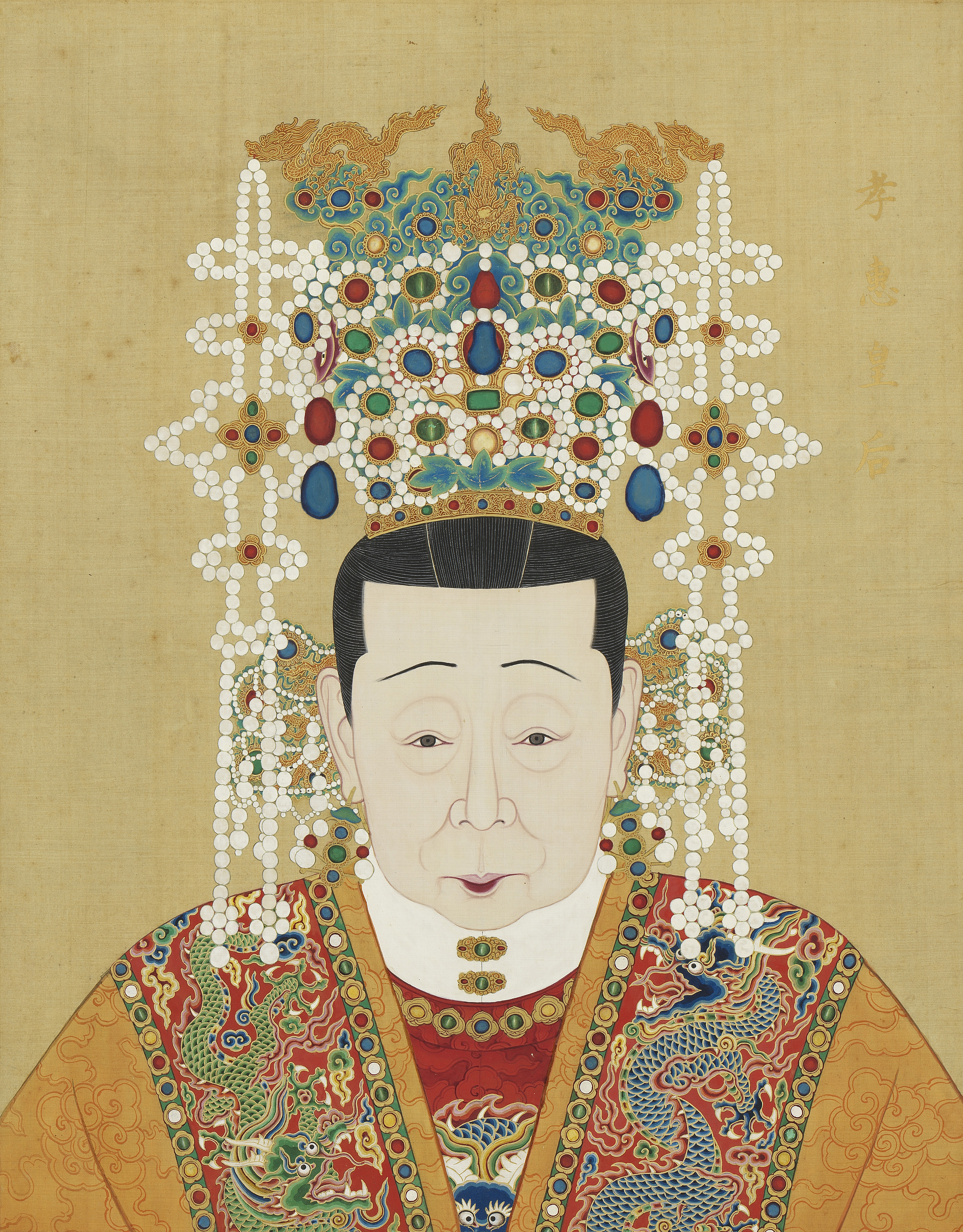

Empress Dowager of the Ming Dynasty
- Reign: 1521-1522
- Predecessor: Empress Dowager Wang
- Successor: Empress Dowager Rensheng; Empress Dowager Xiaoding
- Born: ? Changhua, Hangzhou
- Died: 5 December 1522
- Burial: Maoling Mausoleum, Changping District, Beijing
- Spouse: Chenghua Emperor
- Issue: Zhu Youyuan, Prince of Xing (Emperor Ruizong); Zhu Youlun, Prince Hui of Qi; Zhu Youyun, Prince Jing of Yong
Posthumous name
- Empress Xiaohui Kangsu Wenren Yishun Xietian Yousheng (孝惠康肅溫仁懿順協天祐聖皇后)
- Clan: Shao (邵)
- Father: Shao Lin, Earl of Changhua (昌化伯 邵林)
- Mother: Lady Yang (杨氏)

Empress Xiaohui (孝惠皇后; d. 5 December 1522), of the Shao clan, was a consort of the Chenghua Emperor.

== Life ==
Official history does not record the year of her birth. The ancestors of the Shao family were wealthy, and Lady Shao received a good education. For an unknown reason, her father Shao Lin lost his fortune overnight. He had to sell his daughter to the eunuch guarding Hangzhou. Seeing Lady Shao's beauty, the eunuch brought her to the palace. In the fourth year of Tianshun (1460), Lady Shao was selected to serve.

In the eighth year of Tianshun (1464), seventeen-year-old prince Zhu Jianshen succeeded to the throne as the Chenghua Emperor. After training in calligraphy and literature, Lady Shao was presented as a gift to the emperor. How she became his concubine remains unknown. Legends say that one night, Lady Shao recited a poem under the moon and was heard by the emperor.

In the 12th year of Chenghua (1476), Lady Shao gave birth to Zhu Youyan, Prince of Xin. Later that year, Lady Shao was granted the title Consort Chen. In the fourteenth year of Chenghua (1478), she birthed her second son, Zhu Youlin, Prince Hui of Xin. In the seventeenth year of Chenghua (1481), Consort Chen gave birth to her final child, Zhu Youyun, Prince Jing of Yong.

== Titles ==
- During the reign of the Zhengtong Emperor (r. 1435–1449)
  - Lady Shao (邵氏; from an unknown date)
- During the reign of the Chenghua Emperor (r. 1464–1487):
  - Concubine (嬪; after 1464)
  - Consort Chen (宸妃; from 1476)
  - Noble Consort (貴妃; from 1487)
- During the reign of the Jiajing Emperor (r. 1521–1567):
  - Empress dowager (皇太后; from 1521)
  - Empress Dowager Shou'an (壽安皇太后; from 1522)
  - Empress Dowager Xiaohui Kangsu Wenren Yishun Xietian Yousheng (孝惠康肅溫仁懿順協天祐聖皇太后; from 1522)
  - Grand Empress Dowager Xiaohui Kangsu Wenren Yishun Xietian Yousheng (孝惠康肅溫仁懿順協天祐聖太皇太后; from 1528)
  - Empress Xiaohui Kangsu Wenren Yishun Xietian Yousheng (孝惠康肅溫仁懿順協天祐聖皇后; from 1536)

== Descendants ==
As a concubine:

- Zhu Youyuan, Prince of Xing (興王 朱佑杬; 22 July 1476 – 13 July 1519), the Chengua Emperor's fourth son

As Noble Consort:

- Zhu Youlun, Prince Hui of Qi (岐惠王 朱佑棆; 12 November 1478 – 2 December 1501), the Chenghua Emperor's fifth son
- Zhu Youyun, Prince Jing of Yong (雍靖王 朱佑枟; 29 June 1481 – 17 January 1507), the Chenghua Emperor's eighth son

Zhu Youyuan was the biological father of Zhu Houcong, the Jiajing Emperor. When Zhu Houcong became emperor, Consort Chen was old and blind. In the first year of Jiajing, he honoured Lady Shao as Empress Dowager Shou'an. The next year, she died and was posthumously awarded the title Empress Xiaohui.
