= Aoluguya Evenk Ethnic Township =

Ethnic township in Inner Mongolia, China

Olguya Evenk Ethnic Township 敖鲁古雅鄂温克民族乡 • ᠣᠯᠭᠤᠶᠠ ᠡᠸᠡᠩᠬᠢ ᠦᠨᠳᠦᠰᠦᠲᠡᠨ ᠦ ᠰᠢᠶᠠᠩ
- Ethnic Township
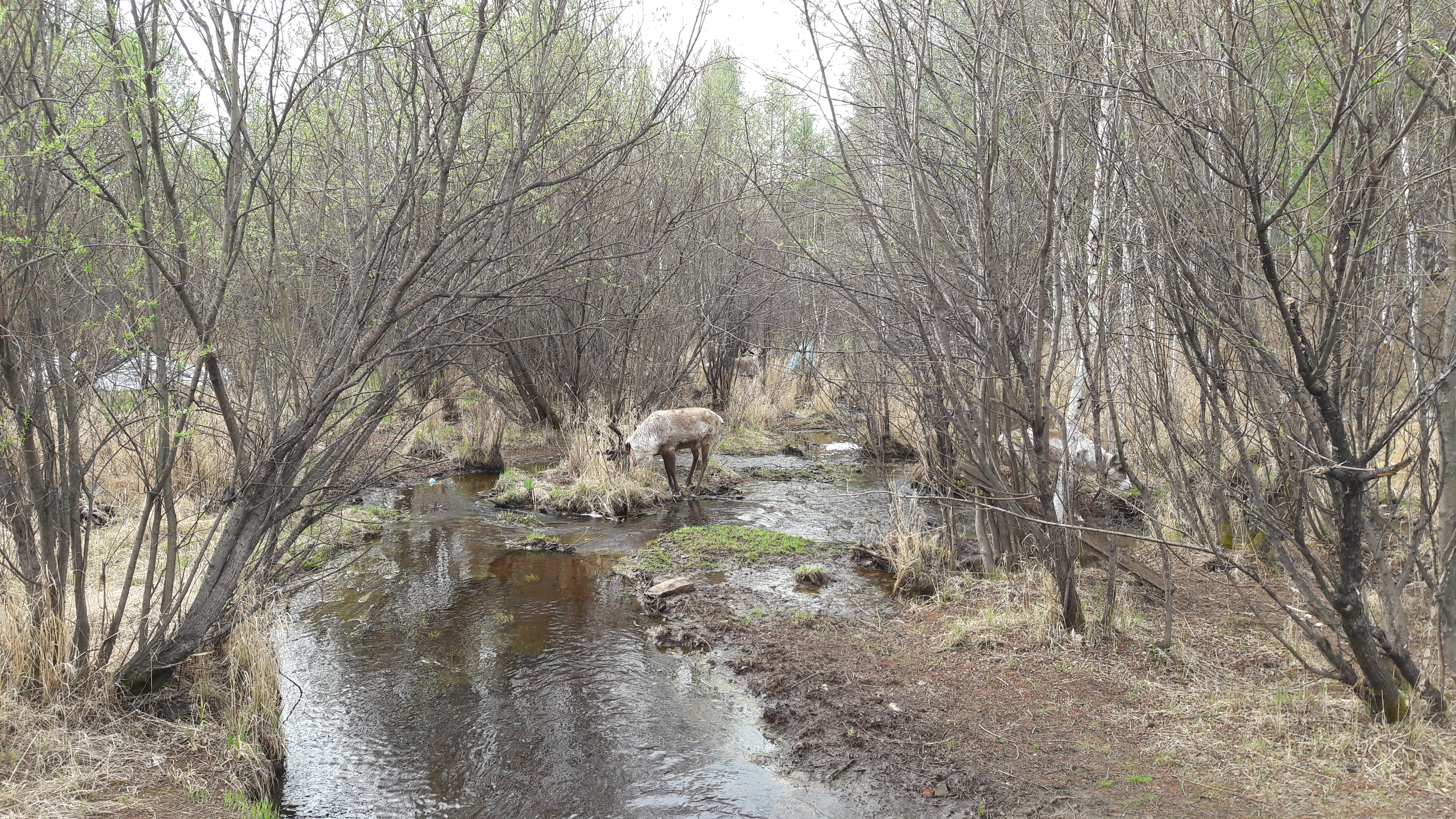

- Location within China
- Country: China
- Autonomous Region: Inner Mongolia
- Prefecture-level City: Hulunbuir
- County-level city: Genhe

Olguya Evenk Ethnic Township or Aoluguya, is an ethnic township under the administration of the county-level city of Genhe, Hulunbuir, Inner Mongolia, China.

== Toponymy ==
Olguya is Evenk for "place where the poplars flourish".

== History ==
In the mid-17th century, ethnic Evenk reindeer herders first migrated to the Argun River basin, where the township is located.
