= Dongbao, Jingmen =

Dongbao 东宝区
- District
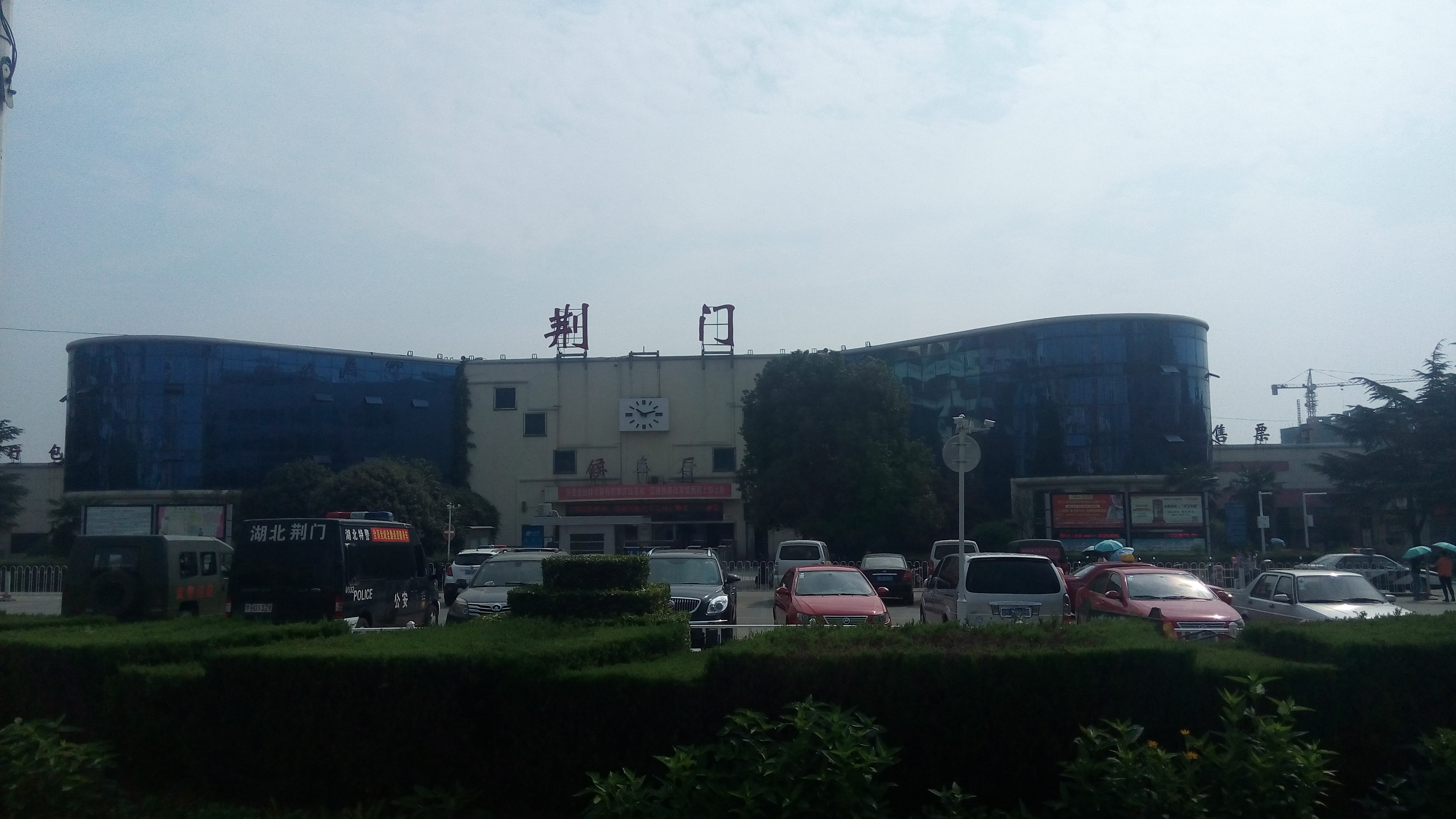
- Jingmen Railway Station from the west

- Location in Hubei
- Coordinates: 31°02′55″N 112°10′56″E
- Country: China
- Province: Hubei
- Prefecture-level city: Jingmen
- District seat: Quankou Subdistrict

Area
  - Total: 2,228 km^{2} (860 sq mi)

Population (2020 census)
  - Total: 328,088
  - Density: 147.3/km^{2} (381.4/sq mi)
- Time zone: UTC+8 (China Standard)
- Website: www.jmdbq.gov.cn

Dongbao District (simplified Chinese: 东宝区; traditional Chinese: 東寶區; pinyin: Dōngbǎo Qū) is a district of the city of Jingmen, Hubei, China.

== History ==
Dongbao District was established in 1985. 'Dongbao' refers to the 'Dongshan Baota' Pagoda established during the Sui dynasty. On March 17, 2001, Hechang Township, Macheng Town, Tuanlinpu Town, Duodaoshi Subdistrict and Baimiao Subdistrict were made into Duodao District.

== Administrative divisions ==
The district is divided into 2 subdistricts, 6 towns and 1 township.

Two subdistricts are: Longquan Subdistrict (龙泉街道), Quankou Subdistrict (泉口街道).

Six towns are: Lixi (栗溪镇), Ziling (子陵镇), Zhanghe (漳河镇), Mahe (马河镇), Shiqiaoyi (石桥驿镇), Pailou (牌楼镇).

The only township is Xianju Township (仙居乡)
