= Hedong Subdistrict, Genhe =

Hedong Subdistrict 河东街道
- Subdistrict
- Location in Inner Mongolia
- Coordinates: 50°47′11″N 121°31′10″E
- Country: People's Republic of China
- Region: Inner Mongolia
- Prefecture-level city: Hulunbuir
- County-level city: Genhe
- Village-level divisions: 3 residential communities
- Elevation: 718 m (2,356 ft)
- Time zone: UTC+8 (China Standard)
- Postal code: 022300
- Area code: 0470

Hedong Subdistrict (simplified Chinese: 河东街道; traditional Chinese: 河東街道; pinyin: Hédōng Jiēdào; lit. 'river east') is a subdistrict in the heart of the city of Genhe, Inner Mongolia, People's Republic of China. The subdistrict derives its name from its location east of the Gen River (根河) which flows through Genhe. As of 2018, it has three residential communities (居委会) under its administration.

== See also ==
- List of township-level divisions of Inner Mongolia
