= Jingshan, Hubei =

City in Hubei, China

Jingshan 京山市 Kingshan
- County-level city
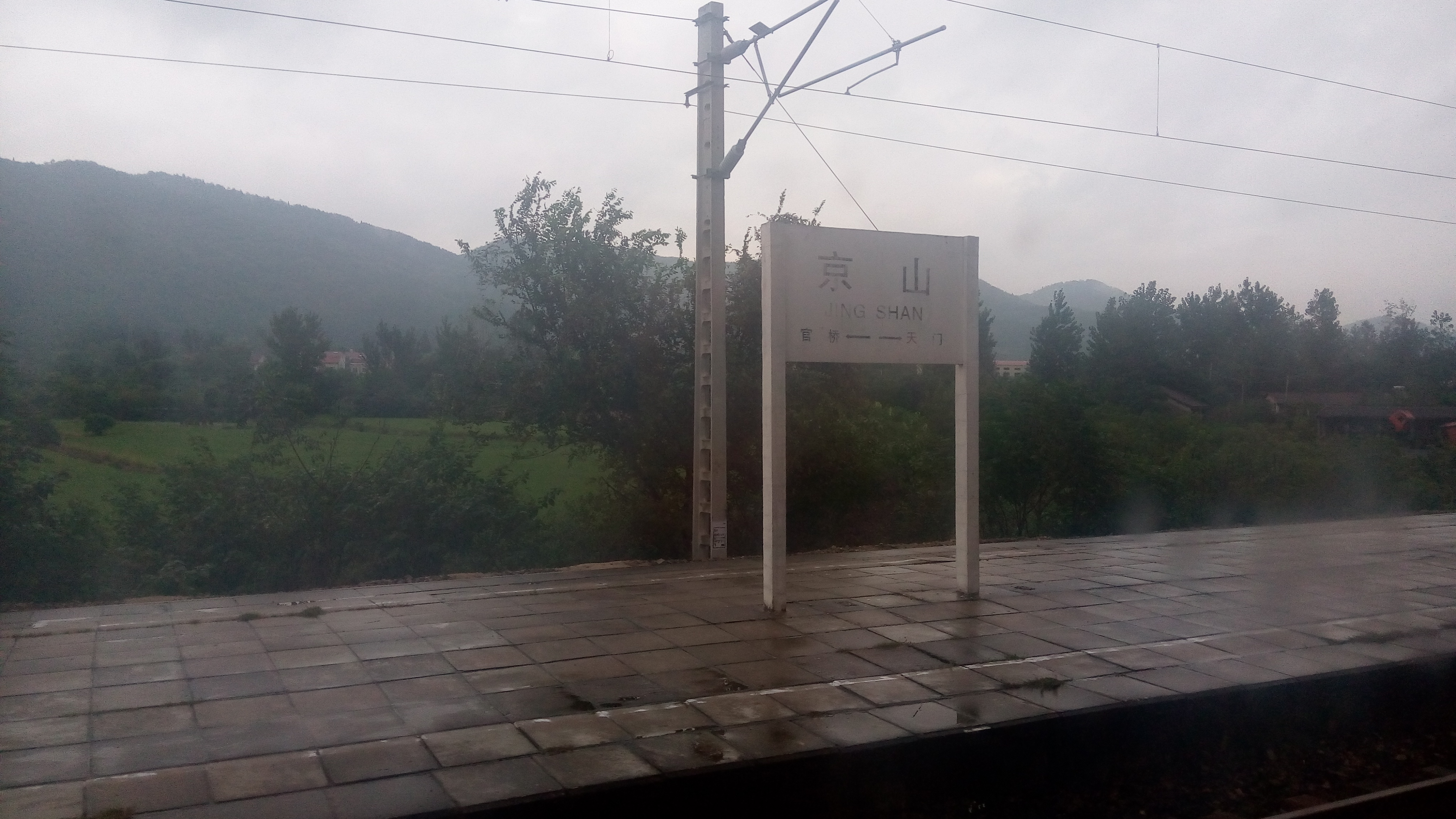
- Jingshan Railway Station

- Location in Hubei
- Coordinates: 31°08′N 113°07′E
- Country: People's Republic of China
- Province: Hubei
- Prefecture-level city: Jingmen
- Towns: 14

Area
  - Total: 3,520 km^{2} (1,360 sq mi)

Population (2016)
  - Total: 645,900
  - Density: 183/km^{2} (475/sq mi)
- Time zone: UTC+8 (China Standard)
- Postal code: 431800
- Website: (In Chinese) Jingshan County government website

Jingshan, Hubei
- Chinese: 京山市
- Literal meaning: Mount Jīngyuán City
Transcriptions
Standard Mandarin
- Hanyu Pinyin: Jīngshān Shì

Jingshan is a county-level city of Jingmen City, in central Hubei Province, People's Republic of China. It is named after nearby Mount Jingyuan (京源山). It is bordered on the north by the Dahong Mountain and on the south by the Jianghan Plain. The county has an area of over 3,520 square kilometres (1,360 sq mi). It has one economic development zone, jurisdiction 14 towns. Jingshan is located approximately one hour's drive from the provincial capital Wuhan.

== Administrative divisions ==
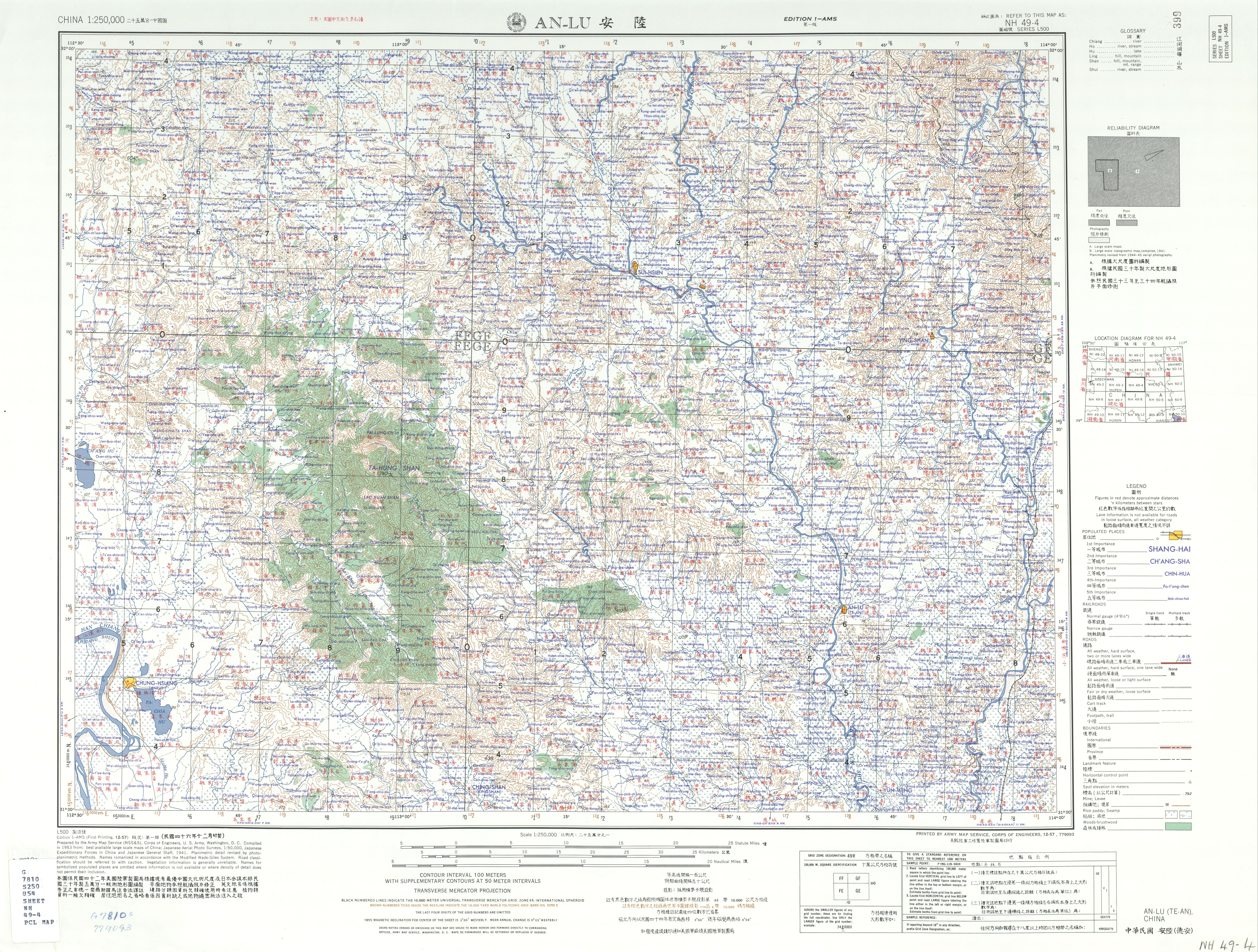
Map including Jingshan (labeled as CHING-SHAN (KINGSHAN) 京山) (1953)

There are 14 towns in Jingshan:

Name	Chinese (S)	Hanyu Pinyin
Xinshi	新市镇	Xīnshì
Yongxing	永兴镇	Yǒngxīng
Caowu	曹武镇	Cáowǔ
Luodian	罗店镇	Luódiàn
Songhe	宋河镇	Sònghé
Pingba	坪坝镇	Píngbà
Sanyang	三阳镇	Sānyáng
Lulin	绿林镇	Lùlín
Yangji	杨集镇	Yángjí
Sunqiao	孙桥镇	Sūnqiáo
Shilong	石龙镇	Shílóng
Yonglong	永漋镇	Yǒnglóng
Yanmenkou	雁门口镇	Yànménkǒu
Qianchang	钱场镇	Qiánchǎng

== Climate ==
Climate data for Jingshan, elevation 85 m (279 ft), (1991–2020 normals, extremes 1981–present)
Month	Jan	Feb	Mar	Apr	May	Jun	Jul	Aug	Sep	Oct	Nov	Dec	Year
Record high °C (°F)	20.9 (69.6)	25.9 (78.6)	32.6 (90.7)	34.1 (93.4)	35.9 (96.6)	37.9 (100.2)	38.7 (101.7)	39.0 (102.2)	37.9 (100.2)	34.1 (93.4)	28.6 (83.5)	21.6 (70.9)	39.0 (102.2)
Mean daily maximum °C (°F)	8.7 (47.7)	11.2 (52.2)	17.3 (63.1)	22.8 (73.0)	27.1 (80.8)	29.9 (85.8)	32.4 (90.3)	33.0 (91.4)	28.4 (83.1)	23.4 (74.1)	16.9 (62.4)	11.2 (52.2)	21.9 (71.3)
Daily mean °C (°F)	4.1 (39.4)	6.4 (43.5)	11.8 (53.2)	17.3 (63.1)	22.0 (71.6)	25.5 (77.9)	28.3 (82.9)	28.2 (82.8)	23.5 (74.3)	17.9 (64.2)	11.7 (53.1)	5.9 (42.6)	16.9 (62.4)
Mean daily minimum °C (°F)	0.6 (33.1)	2.8 (37.0)	7.5 (45.5)	12.7 (54.9)	17.7 (63.9)	21.9 (71.4)	25.0 (77.0)	24.7 (76.5)	19.9 (67.8)	14.0 (57.2)	7.9 (46.2)	2.2 (36.0)	13.1 (55.5)
Record low °C (°F)	−7.6 (18.3)	−7.9 (17.8)	−4.2 (24.4)	0.5 (32.9)	7.9 (46.2)	13.2 (55.8)	18.5 (65.3)	16.5 (61.7)	11.0 (51.8)	1.3 (34.3)	−3.2 (26.2)	−9.4 (15.1)	−9.4 (15.1)
Average precipitation mm (inches)	30.3 (1.19)	41.0 (1.61)	58.1 (2.29)	100.2 (3.94)	129.6 (5.10)	180.3 (7.10)	207.6 (8.17)	129.8 (5.11)	64.3 (2.53)	64.3 (2.53)	45.9 (1.81)	21.1 (0.83)	1,072.5 (42.21)
Average precipitation days (≥ 0.1 mm)	7.6	8.8	10.5	10.7	12.8	10.9	11.5	9.6	8.4	9.7	8.3	6.5	115.3
Average snowy days	4.2	2.6	1.1	0	0	0	0	0	0	0	0.4	1.5	9.8
Average relative humidity (%)	70	71	71	72	72	78	79	77	73	72	73	69	73
Mean monthly sunshine hours	113.4	110.9	140.9	165.9	179.4	169.2	209.8	213.9	163.0	154.1	139.4	130.4	1,890.3
Percentage possible sunshine	35	35	38	43	42	40	49	53	44	44	44	42	42
Source: China Meteorological Administration

== Population ==
In 2002, 636,100 people lived in Jingshan. 403,100 of them were rural inhabitants whilst 233,000 formed the urban population. 320,100 of them were male and 316,000 female. The central towns have a total population of 233,200 inhabitants, 15,500 of them are mobile. In Jingshan the population density is 181 people per km^{2} with an average life expectancy of 74.12 years.

By the end of 2016, 645,900 people lived in Jingshan; 332,272 male and 313,713 female.

== Natural resources ==
=== Land resources ===
At the end of 2002, the city had 98846.37 hectares (1482695.6 acres) of farmland (29.56% of the total area), 31776.07 hectares (476641.00 acres) of water (9.51%) and 43040.54 hectares of unused land (645608.10 acres) accounting for 12.88% of the total.

=== Mineral resources ===
Jingshan has rich mineral resources. After years of extensive geological studies, more than 20 kinds of minerals have been found in Jingshan. The main non-metallic mineral mines in the city include limestone (500 million tons), dolomite (700 million tons) and Silica (300 million tons).

=== Water resources ===
The rivers of Jingshan are mainly fed by surface water and groundwater. The annual precipitation averages 1179 mm and the average annual runoff adds up to 350.5 mm, equivalent to 1.173 billion cubic meters. There are more than 500 rivers, 68 of them more than 10 kilometers long. Inside the county, the Block Reservoir, Ponds contain a total 1.329 billion cubic meters of water.

=== Animal and plant resources ===
Major crops are rice, barley, broad beans, soybeans, and many varieties of corn . Native products are mainly mushrooms, fungi, bridge meters, chestnut, tea and seedless watermelons.

The flora in Jingshan derive from 73 branches, 146 genera and 247 species.

Pangolins, wolves, bifurcates, leopards, parrots and wildlife in general are protected according to law within the territory of the state.

== Industry and economy ==
In 2005, the city achieved a GDP of 7.1 billion. There are more than 100 enterprises, eleven of which are 10 million euro enterprises. 39 of them are 10 million yuan enterprises. Yearly exports reached 48 million U.S. dollars in 2005.

Construction, machinery manufacturing, materials processing, textiles and garments, chemical metallurgy and food processing shape the five industrial clusters.
