= Zhongxiang =

Zhongxiang 钟祥市 Chungsiang
- County-level City
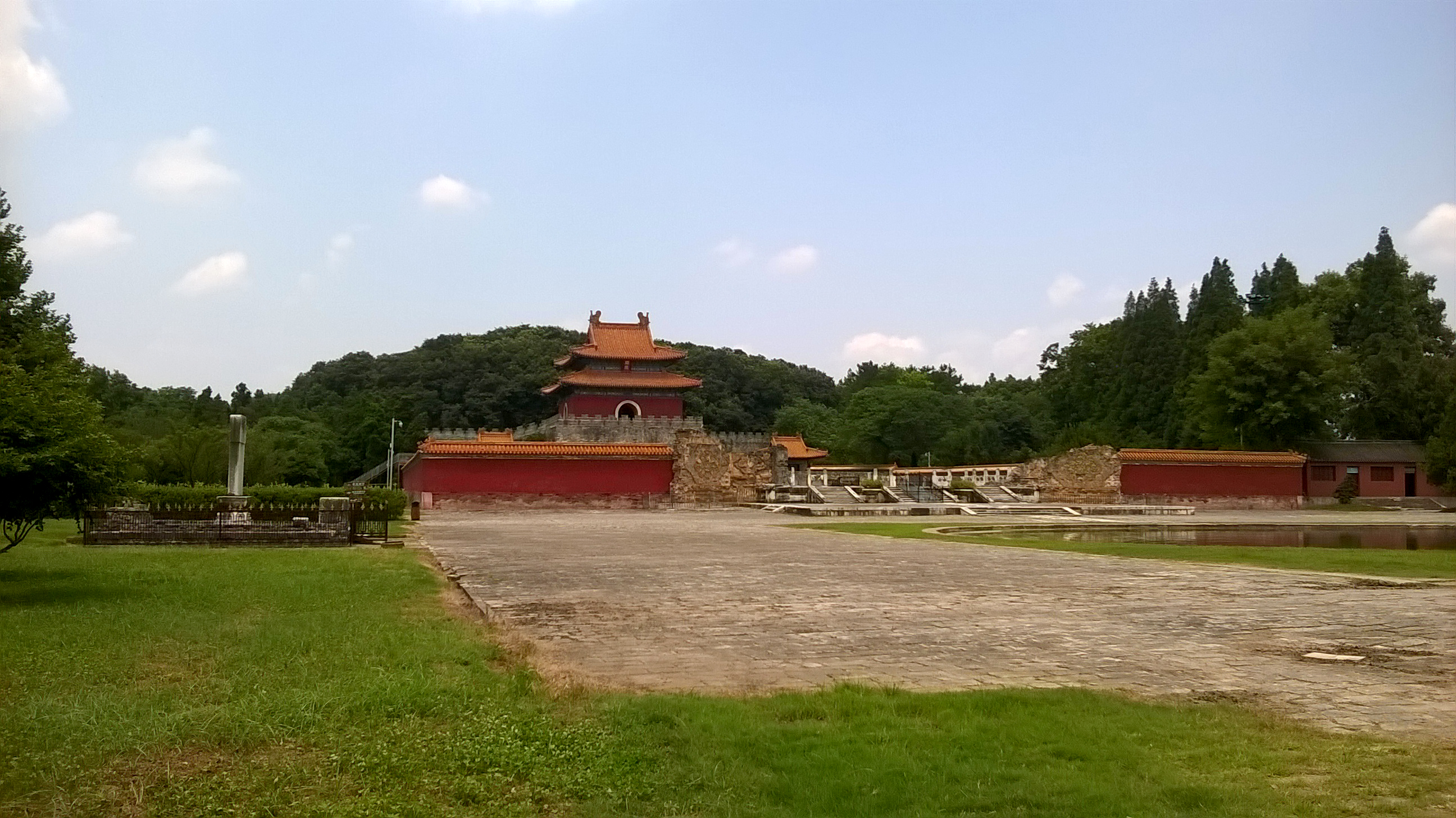
- Ming Xianling

- Location in Hubei
- Coordinates (Zhongxiang government): 31°10′05″N 112°35′17″E
- Country: People's Republic of China
- Province: Hubei
- Prefecture-level city: Jingmen
- Township-level divisions: 1 subdistrict 15 towns 1 township
- Seat: Yingzhong Subdistrict (郢中街道)

Area
  - County-level City: 4,488 km^{2} (1,733 sq mi)
  - Urban: 175.00 km^{2} (67.57 sq mi)
- Elevation: 66 m (217 ft)

Population (2020 census)
  - County-level City: 868,897
  - Density: 193.6/km^{2} (501.4/sq mi)
  - Urban: 439,394
- Time zone: UTC+8 (China Standard)
- Postal code: 431900
- Area code: 0724
- Website: http://www.zhongxiang.gov.cn/

Zhongxiang (simplified Chinese: 钟祥; traditional Chinese: 鍾祥; pinyin: Zhōngxiáng; Wade–Giles: Chung^{¹}-hsiang^{²}) is a county-level city of Jingmen, central Hubei province, People's Republic of China. The name Zhongxiang means "Blessed with propitious omen", and was given to the city by the Jiajing Emperor in the Ming dynasty.

== History ==
Zhongxiang is one of the cradles of Chu culture. It was the alternate capital of the Chu state in the Spring and Autumn period and the Warring States period.

Because the Jiajing Emperor (r. 1521–1566) of the Ming dynasty was born and had lived in the city before he succeeded to the throne, Zhongxiang, the place where the Chengtian Prefecture (fu) Government Office was located, became one of the three major prefectures directly under the central government. Once on the throne, the Jiajing Emperor controversially had his dead father Zhu Youyuan (1476–1519) retroactively styled as the Gongruixian Emperor; his mother became the Zhangsheng empress dowager. They were buried at a sumptuous mausoleum, knowns as the Xianling Tomb, a few kilometers northeast of Zhongxiang.

During the Jiajing Emperor's reign, a large estate owned by the emperor occupied a significant part of Chengtian Prefecture, and was run by the same eunuch who was in charge of the protection of the mausoleum.

The mausoleum complex is now a tourist site; it was included on the List of UNESCO World Heritage Sites in 2000, as one of the Imperial Tombs of the Ming and Qing Dynasties.

== Geography ==
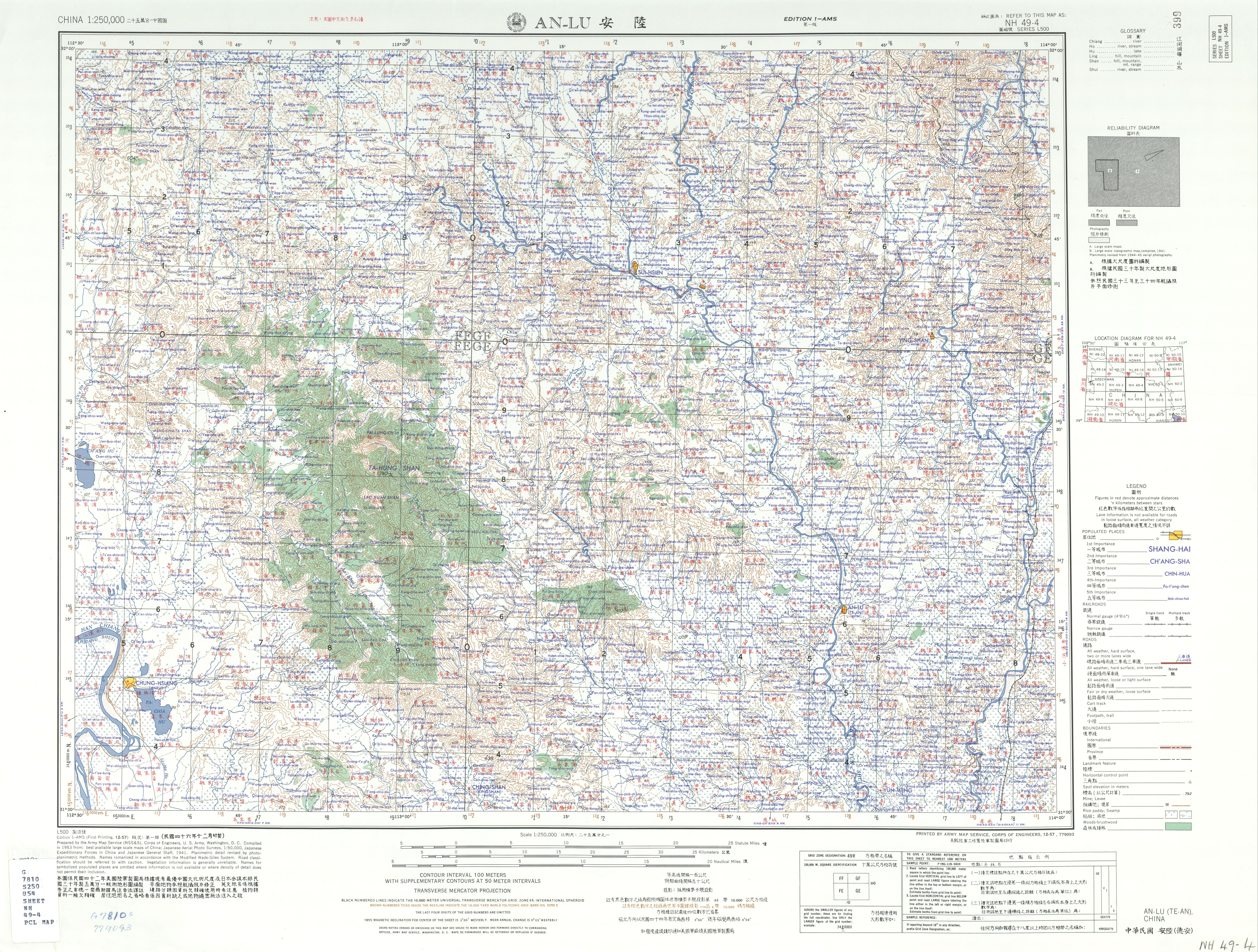
Map including Zhongxiang (labeled as CHUNG-HSIANG (ANLU) 鍾祥(安陸)) (1953)

Zhongxiang, with a total land area of 4,488 square kilometres (1,733 sq mi), is situated in the central part of Hubei. It lies at the north of Jianghan Plain, and the middle reaches of the Han River, with latitude ranging from 30° 42' to 31° 36' N and longitude 112° 07' to 113° 00' E, and a maximum north–south extent of 100.6 km (62.5 mi) and east–west width of 83.5 km (51.9 mi). The urban area is at 66 m (217 ft) above sea level. After the building of the Three Gorges Dam a number of people from the Gaoyang area moved to the area around Zhongxiang. It borders Suizhou to the northeast, Jingshan County to the east, Tianmen to the south, the two districts (urban area) of Jingmen to the west, and Yicheng to the northwest.

=== Climate ===
Zhongxiang has a four-season humid subtropical climate (Köppen Cfa), with cold, damp (but comparatively dry), winters, and hot, humid summers. The average annual temperature is 16.5 °C (61.7 °F). July is the hottest month, with an average temperature 27.8 °C (82.0 °F). January is the coldest month, with an average temperature of 3.7 °C (38.7 °F). The coldest temperature ever recorded in Zhongxiang was −15.3 °C (4 °F) on January 30, 1977.

Zhongxiang has abundant precipitation throughout the year, with average precipitation of 972.3 millimetres (38.28 in) every year. Rain and heat are occurring in the same season. Snow is infrequent. Zhongxiang receives plenty of sunshine, with about 1930.8 to 2114.3 hours every year.

Climate data for Zhongxiang, elevation 108 m (354 ft), (1991–2020 normals, extremes 1971–present)
Month	Jan	Feb	Mar	Apr	May	Jun	Jul	Aug	Sep	Oct	Nov	Dec	Year
Record high °C (°F)	21.1 (70.0)	25.3 (77.5)	31.5 (88.7)	33.8 (92.8)	35.6 (96.1)	38.4 (101.1)	38.6 (101.5)	38.5 (101.3)	38.0 (100.4)	33.4 (92.1)	28.9 (84.0)	21.6 (70.9)	38.6 (101.5)
Mean daily maximum °C (°F)	7.8 (46.0)	11.0 (51.8)	15.6 (60.1)	22.1 (71.8)	27.0 (80.6)	30.1 (86.2)	32.1 (89.8)	31.6 (88.9)	27.8 (82.0)	22.7 (72.9)	16.1 (61.0)	10.1 (50.2)	21.2 (70.1)
Daily mean °C (°F)	3.9 (39.0)	6.6 (43.9)	11.1 (52.0)	17.2 (63.0)	22.2 (72.0)	25.9 (78.6)	28.1 (82.6)	27.3 (81.1)	23.2 (73.8)	17.9 (64.2)	11.7 (53.1)	6.1 (43.0)	16.8 (62.2)
Mean daily minimum °C (°F)	0.9 (33.6)	3.3 (37.9)	7.6 (45.7)	13.4 (56.1)	18.4 (65.1)	22.6 (72.7)	25.2 (77.4)	24.1 (75.4)	19.8 (67.6)	14.5 (58.1)	8.3 (46.9)	2.9 (37.2)	13.4 (56.1)
Record low °C (°F)	−15.3 (4.5)	−7.4 (18.7)	−2.1 (28.2)	0.0 (32.0)	8.4 (47.1)	12.7 (54.9)	17.9 (64.2)	15.4 (59.7)	11.0 (51.8)	2.9 (37.2)	−2.6 (27.3)	−8.4 (16.9)	−15.3 (4.5)
Average precipitation mm (inches)	28.2 (1.11)	36.3 (1.43)	51.9 (2.04)	89.4 (3.52)	128.3 (5.05)	140.4 (5.53)	173.8 (6.84)	142.4 (5.61)	62.5 (2.46)	68.3 (2.69)	42.0 (1.65)	19.7 (0.78)	983.2 (38.71)
Average precipitation days (≥ 0.1 mm)	7.0	8.4	9.8	10.7	12.0	10.9	11.0	9.7	8.5	9.4	7.9	6.3	111.6
Average snowy days	4.3	3.1	1.5	0	0	0	0	0	0	0	0.5	1.8	11.2
Average relative humidity (%)	73	72	73	74	72	78	81	80	76	74	73	71	75
Mean monthly sunshine hours	96.1	99.8	130.0	155.7	164.7	153.0	190.6	199.5	152.7	144.2	125.9	109.5	1,721.7
Percentage possible sunshine	30	32	35	40	39	36	44	49	42	41	40	35	39
Source 1: China Meteorological Administration
Source 2: Weather China

== Administrative divisions ==
Zhongxiang is administratively equal to a county and is divided into 17 township-level division: 1 subdistrict, 15 towns, and 1 township.

- Yingzhong Subdistrict (郢中街道), 49 square kilometres (19 sq mi), 170,991
- Yangzi (洋梓镇), 403 square kilometres (156 sq mi), 68,341
- Changshou (长寿镇), 275 square kilometres (106 sq mi), 27,535
- Fengle (丰乐镇), 162 square kilometres (63 sq mi), 68,700
- Huji (胡集镇), 393 square kilometres (152 sq mi), 129,891
- Shuanghe (双河镇), 235 square kilometres (91 sq mi), 46,220
- Linkuang (磷矿镇), 219 square kilometres (85 sq mi), 47,092
- Wenji (文集镇), 128 square kilometres (49 sq mi), 44,405
- Lengshui (冷水镇), 314 square kilometres (121 sq mi), 47,393
- Shipai (石牌镇), 295 square kilometres (114 sq mi), 84,296
- Jiukou (旧口镇), 201 square kilometres (78 sq mi), 103,514
- Chaihu (柴湖镇), 225 square kilometres (87 sq mi), 95,663
- Changtan (长滩镇), 153 square kilometres (59 sq mi), 20,338
- Dongqiao (东桥镇), 256 square kilometres (99 sq mi), 24,085
- Kedian (客店镇), 293 square kilometres (113 sq mi), 14,581
- Zhangji (张集镇), 289 square kilometres (112 sq mi), 22,805
- Jiuli Township (九里乡), 99 square kilometres (38 sq mi), 16,718

== Economy ==
=== Industry ===
After years of construction, an industrial structure has been initially formed by the development of machinery, building materials, chemicals, light industry, textile and food industry. Among more than 600 industrial products, 20 of them entered international markets, 45 species are at national leading level and 130 species are at the leading level in Hubei province.

As of 2009, 265 main industrial enterprises contribute 19.563 billion yuan to the city's industrial output value with a sales value of 18.9747 billion yuan, export delivery value of 307.16 million yuan.

=== Agriculture ===
ZhongXiang has diversified terrain and appropriate subtropical monsoon climate. The total land area is 4760 square kilometer, with 1300 square kilometer cultivated land 300 square kilometer uncultivated land. Area for forest, waters and pasture is 1300 square kilometer, 50 square kilometer and 1200 square kilometer respectively. The total amount of freshwater resources is 5104.2 billion cubic meters.

With diversified terrain, there are different kinds of agricultural products. Main agricultural products include grains, cotton, oil, pigs, poultry, fruits, vegetables, and edible fungus. Main crops includes rice, wheat, corn, soybean silkworm peas, and cotton, rapeseed, peanut, sesame, vegetables, citrus fruit, pears, grape, red jujube, peaches, tea, etc.

In 2009, the municipal agricultural output value reached 8.2 billion yuan. Total agricultural production includes 816500 tons total grain output, 144100 tons cotton output, 120700 tons oil production; 92000 tons animal production; 110,000 tons output of aquatic products; 193,300 tons fruit production.

== Sights ==
- Xianling Tomb (显陵)
- Mountain Dahong National Scenic Area (大洪山国家森林公园)
- Huangxian Cave (黄仙洞) famous for its karst landform
- Wenxia Reservoir (温峡水库)
