= Genhe =

Genhe 根河市 • ᢉᢉᠠᠠ ᠭᠣᠤᠯ ᠬᠣᠲᠠ
- County-level city
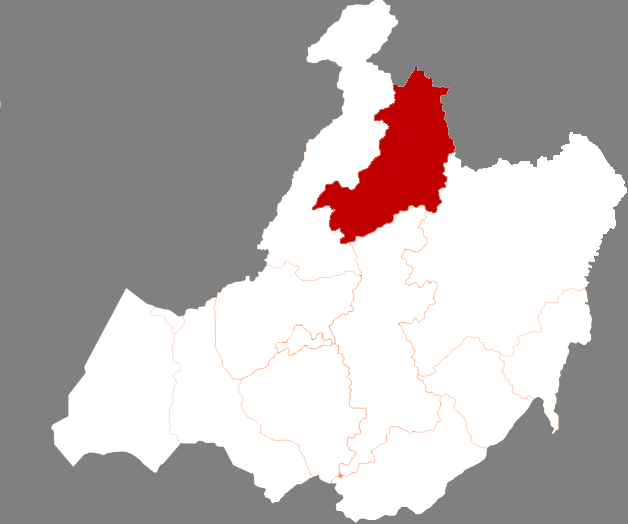
- Location of Genhe in Hulunbuir City

- Location of the city centre in Inner Mongolia Genhe (China)
- Coordinates: 50°47′N 121°31′E
- Country: China
- Autonomous region: Inner Mongolia
- Prefecture-level city: Hulunbuir
- Municipal seat: Hexi Subdistrict

Area
  - County-level city: 19,659.0 km^{2} (7,590.4 sq mi)
  - Urban: 350.00 km^{2} (135.14 sq mi)
- Elevation: 714 m (2,343 ft)

Population (2020)
  - County-level city: 71,437
  - Density: 3.6338/km^{2} (9.4115/sq mi)
  - Urban: 64,400
- Time zone: UTC+8 (China Standard)
- Postal code: 022300
- Area code: 0470
- Website: www.genhe.gov.cn

Genhe

Chinese name
- Chinese: 根河市
Transcriptions
Standard Mandarin
- Hanyu Pinyin: Gēnhé Shì

Former name
- Simplified Chinese: 额尔古纳左旗
- Traditional Chinese: 額爾古納左旗
Transcriptions
Standard Mandarin
- Hanyu Pinyin: É'ěrgǔnà Zuǒ Qí

Mongolian name
- Mongolian Cyrillic: Гэгээнгол хот
- Mongolian script: ᠭᠡᠭᠡᠨ ᠭᠣᠤᠯ ᠬᠣᠲᠠ
Transcriptions
- SASM/GNC: Gegen Gôûl Hôt

Genhe City or Gegengol (Mongolian: ᠭᠡᠭᠡᠨ ᠭᠣᠤᠯ ᠬᠣᠲᠠ; Chinese: 根河市), formerly Ergun Left Banner (Chinese: 额尔古纳左旗), is a county-level city in the far northeast of Inner Mongolia, China, under the administration of Hulunbuir City. The city spans an area of 19,659 square kilometres (7,590 mi^{2}), and has a total population of 130,722 as of 2019.

== Geography and climate ==
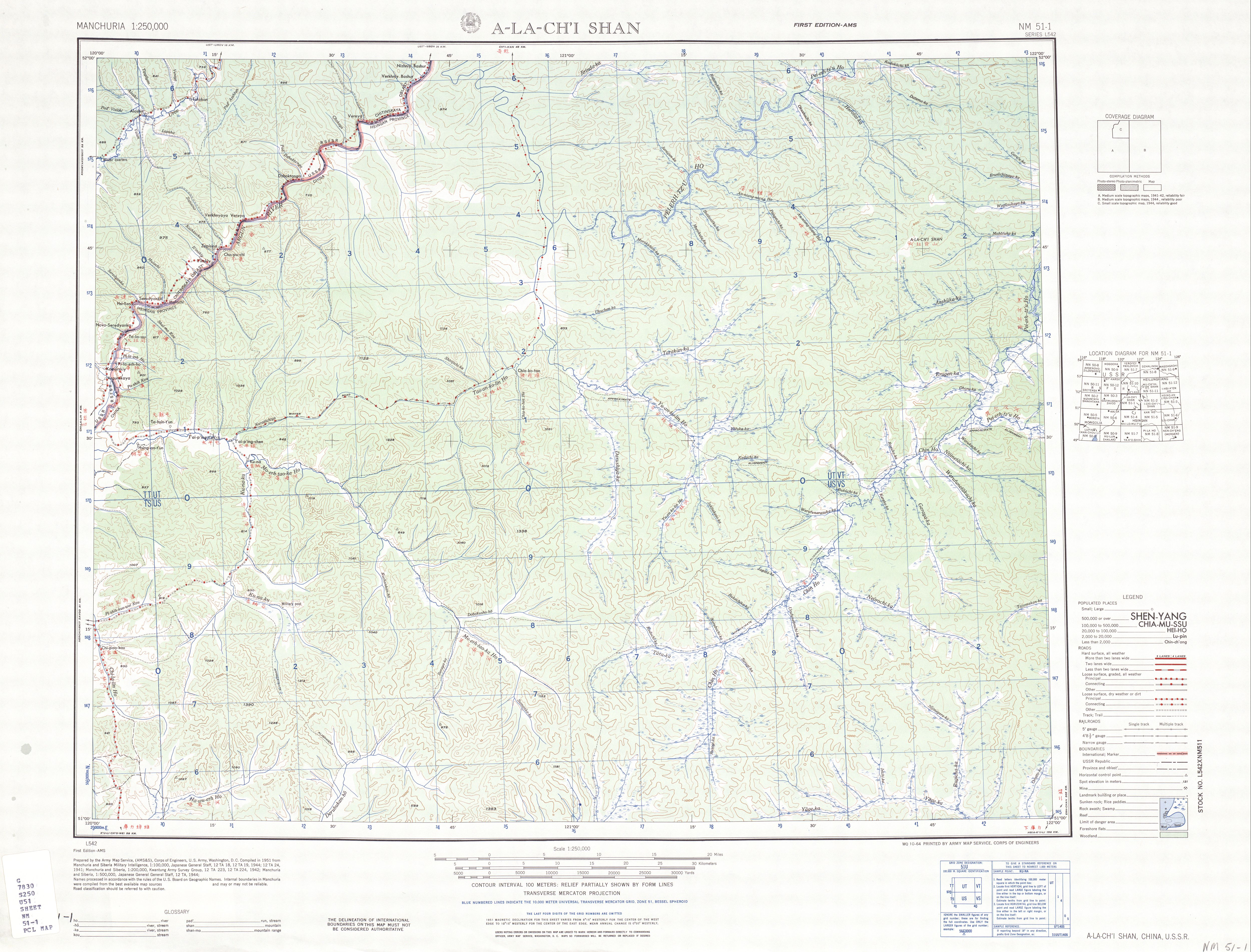
Alaqi Mountain (labelled as A-LA-CH'I SHAN 阿拉齊山) (1951)

Genhe has a monsoon-influenced subarctic climate (Köppen Dwc), making it one of the coldest locations nationally, with an annual mean temperature of −3.56 °C (25.6 °F). Winters are long, severely cold, and very dry in terms of total precipitation, while summers are short and warm; the normal monthly mean temperature ranges from −28.1 °C (−18.6 °F) in January to 17.6 °C (63.7 °F) in July. Over two-thirds of the annual precipitation of 438 mm (17.2 in) is distributed from June through August.

Climate data for Genhe, elevation 717 m (2,352 ft), (1991–2020 normals, extremes 1960–2010)
Month	Jan	Feb	Mar	Apr	May	Jun	Jul	Aug	Sep	Oct	Nov	Dec	Year
Record high °C (°F)	−4.7 (23.5)	2.5 (36.5)	15.2 (59.4)	24.4 (75.9)	34.5 (94.1)	34.5 (94.1)	35.7 (96.3)	33.3 (91.9)	31.4 (88.5)	24.8 (76.6)	7.8 (46.0)	−4.3 (24.3)	35.7 (96.3)
Mean daily maximum °C (°F)	−19.0 (−2.2)	−12.2 (10.0)	−2.0 (28.4)	8.6 (47.5)	17.7 (63.9)	23.6 (74.5)	25.7 (78.3)	23.3 (73.9)	17.2 (63.0)	6.6 (43.9)	−7.6 (18.3)	−18.4 (−1.1)	5.3 (41.5)
Daily mean °C (°F)	−27.7 (−17.9)	−22.8 (−9.0)	−11.4 (11.5)	1.0 (33.8)	9.8 (49.6)	15.7 (60.3)	18.4 (65.1)	15.7 (60.3)	8.3 (46.9)	−1.8 (28.8)	−15.6 (3.9)	−25.8 (−14.4)	−3.0 (26.6)
Mean daily minimum °C (°F)	−34.3 (−29.7)	−31.3 (−24.3)	−20.5 (−4.9)	−7.3 (18.9)	1.1 (34.0)	7.4 (45.3)	11.7 (53.1)	9.6 (49.3)	1.5 (34.7)	−8.4 (16.9)	−21.8 (−7.2)	−31.4 (−24.5)	−10.3 (13.5)
Record low °C (°F)	−58.0 (−72.4)	−47.5 (−53.5)	−39.5 (−39.1)	−26.6 (−15.9)	−14.7 (5.5)	−4.5 (23.9)	0.9 (33.6)	−3.1 (26.4)	−11.7 (10.9)	−26.4 (−15.5)	−42.0 (−43.6)	−45.2 (−49.4)	−58.0 (−72.4)
Average precipitation mm (inches)	3.7 (0.15)	3.2 (0.13)	5.7 (0.22)	17.4 (0.69)	39.9 (1.57)	81.0 (3.19)	129.8 (5.11)	98.6 (3.88)	50.0 (1.97)	14.9 (0.59)	9.2 (0.36)	6.2 (0.24)	459.6 (18.1)
Average precipitation days (≥ 0.1 mm)	6.5	5.7	6.1	7.3	11.2	15.9	16.9	15.9	11.2	7.1	9.4	9.2	122.4
Average snowy days	9.3	8.8	10.1	8.1	1.5	0.1	0	0	1.1	7.8	13.8	14.1	74.7
Average relative humidity (%)	67	64	60	50	52	68	75	78	72	65	71	71	66
Mean monthly sunshine hours	148.2	189.7	258.7	254.3	245.7	236.2	230.4	207.8	205.6	181.7	141.3	112.3	2,411.9
Percentage possible sunshine	56	66	70	61	51	48	47	47	55	56	54	46	55
Source: China Meteorological AdministrationWeather China

== Administrative divisions ==
Genhe is divided into 4 subdistricts, 4 towns, and 1 ethnic township.

Name	Simplified Chinese	Hanyu Pinyin	Mongolian (Hudum Script)	Mongolian (Cyrillic)	Administrative division code
Subdistricts
Hedong Subdistrict	河东街道	Hédōng Jiēdào	ᠾᠧ ᠳ᠋ᠦᠩ ᠵᠡᠭᠡᠯᠢ ᠭᠤᠳᠢᠮᠵᠢ	Ге дүн зээл гудимж	150785001
Hexi Subdistrict	河西街道	Héxī Jiēdào	ᠾᠧ ᠰᠢ ᠵᠡᠭᠡᠯᠢ ᠭᠤᠳᠤᠮᠵᠢ	Ге ший зээл гудамж	150785002
Sengong Subdistrict	森工街道	Sēngōng Jiēdào	ᠰᠧᠨᠭᠦ᠋ᠩ ᠵᠡᠭᠡᠯᠢ ᠭᠤᠳᠤᠮᠵᠢ	Сенхүн зээл гудамж	150785003
Holbo Subdistrict	好里堡街道	Hǎolǐbǎo Jiēdào	ᠬᠣᠯᠢᠪᠥ᠋ ᠵᠡᠭᠡᠯᠢ ᠭᠤᠳᠤᠮᠵᠢ	Холив зээл гудамж	150785004
Towns
Jinhe Town	金河镇	Jīnhé Zhèn	ᠵᠢᠨ ᠾᠧ ᠪᠠᠯᠭᠠᠰᠤ	Гийн ге балгас	150785101
Alongshan Town	阿龙山镇	Ālóngshān Zhèn	ᠠᠯᠦ᠋ᠩᠱᠠᠨ ᠪᠠᠯᠭᠠᠰᠤ	Алуншин балгас	150785102
Mangui Town	满归镇	Mǎnguī Zhèn	ᠮᠠᠨᠭᠦᠢ ᠪᠠᠯᠭᠠᠰᠤ	Мангүй балгас	150785103
Delbur Town	得耳布尔镇	Dé'ěrbù'ěr Zhèn	ᠳ᠋ᠧᠯᠪᠤᠷ ᠪᠠᠯᠭᠠᠰᠤ	Тельбор балгас	150785104
Ethnic Township
Olguya Evenk Ethnic Township	敖鲁古雅鄂温克民族乡	Áolǔgǔyǎ Èwēnkè Mínzúxiāng	ᠣᠯᠭᠤᠶᠠ ᠡᠸᠡᠩᠬᠢ ᠦᠨᠳᠦᠰᠦᠲᠡᠨ ᠦ ᠰᠢᠶᠠᠩ	Олгоё эвэнк үндэстэний шиян	150785200

== Demographics ==
As of 2019, Genhe is home to 130,722 inhabitants, the 72nd most of Inner Mongolia's 103 county-level divisions. As of 2017, 64,400 of Genhe's residents lived in urban areas.

== Economy ==
Genhe's gross domestic product in 2019 totaled 3,200,870,000 renminbi (RMB), growing at a rate of 2.0% over 2018. Of this, 16.87% came from the city's primary sector, 18.04% came from the city's secondary sector, and 65.09% came from the city's tertiary sector.

Consumer retail sales in Genhe for 2019 totaled 2,305,160,000 RMB.

Households in Genhe earned, on average, 28,375 RMB in disposable income in 2019.

Genhe reported 71,030,000 RMB in public budget revenue in 2019, the lowest of Inner Mongolia's 103 county-level divisions.

As of 2019, there are 119,000 mobile phone subscriptions and 29,200 internet subscriptions in Genhe.

=== Agriculture ===
In 2019, Genhe produced 5,000 tons of grain, ranking 86th among the 96 county-level divisions in Inner Mongolia which reported this statistic. The city also produced 1,167 tons of meat in 2019, ranking 97th among the Inner Mongolia's 103 county-level divisions.

== Education ==
As of 2019, Genhe has seven primary schools and nine secondary schools.

== Healthcare ==
Genhe's medical institutions have 477 beds staffed by 942 personnel, as of 2019.

== Culture ==
A small number of ethnic Evenk reindeer herders remain in the city's Aoluguya Evenk Ethnic Township.

== Transportation ==
2,698 kilometres (1,676 mi) of highway run through Genhe as of 2019.
