= Jingmen–Jingzhou high-speed railway =

High-speed rail line in China

Overview
- Native name: 荆荆铁路
- Status: Operational
- Termini: Jingmen West; Jingzhou
- Stations: 3

Service
- Operator: China Railway Wuhan Group

History
- Opened: 8 December 2024

Technical
- Line length: 77.6 km (48 mi)
- Track gauge: 1,435 mm (4 ft 8 1/2 in)
- Operating speed: 350 km/h (217 mph)

The Jingmen–Jingzhou high-speed railway is a high-speed railway line in Hubei, China. The railway is 77.6 kilometres (48.2 mi) long and have a design speed of 350 kilometres per hour (220 mph). The railway opened on 8 December 2024.

== Route ==
The railway runs from north to south, approximately parallel to the existing freight-only Jingmen–Shashi railway. The northern terminus is Jingmen West, the southern terminus is Jingzhou, and there is one intermediate station, Shayang West.

=== Stations ===
Station Name	Chinese	China Railway transfers/connections
Jingmen West	荆门西	
Shayang West	沙洋西	
Jingzhou	荆州	
