= Shayang County =

Shayang County 沙洋县
- County
- Location within China Location within Hubei
- Coordinates (Shayang government): 30°42′32″N 112°35′20″E
- Country: People's Republic of China
- Province: Hubei
- Prefecture-level city: Jingmen

Area
  - Total: 2,146 km^{2} (829 sq mi)

Population (2020)
  - Total: 395,717
  - Density: 184.4/km^{2} (477.6/sq mi)
- Time zone: UTC+8 (China Standard)
- Website: www.shayang.gov.cn

Shayang (Chinese: 沙洋; pinyin: Shāyáng) is a county of west-central Hubei province, People's Republic of China. Administratively, it is part of the prefecture-level city of Jingmen. The county is located south of the Jingmen city proper, west of the Han River, and north of the Chang Lake (Chang Hu).

The county seat is a town of the same name (Chinese: 沙洋镇; pinyin: Shāyáng Zhèn), situated near the Han River, which eventually flows into the Yangtze River. To the east of the town is a huge flat region which contains one of the largest prison farm systems in China (沙洋监狱管理局). A major provincial highway runs right through the middle of the prison region, and through the massive cotton fields that are tended by convict teams who march to and from the fields and the prisons on special paths separated from the highway by ditches.

== Administrative Divisions ==
Towns:

- Shayang Town (沙洋镇), Wulipu (五里铺镇), Shilipu (十里铺镇), Jishan (纪山镇), Shihuiqiao (拾迴桥镇/拾回桥镇), Hougang (后港镇), Maoli (毛李镇), Guandang (Chinese: 官垱镇/官当镇), Lishi (李市镇), Maliang (马良镇), Gaoyang (高阳镇), Shenji (沈集镇), Zengji (曾集镇)

Other Areas:

- Binjiang New Area (滨江新区), Xingangqu (New Port Area) (新港区), Shayang Economic Development District (沙洋经济开发区), Shayang Prison Management Bureau (沙洋监狱管理局)
