= Jingmen =

Jingmen 荆门市 Kingmen
- Prefecture-level city
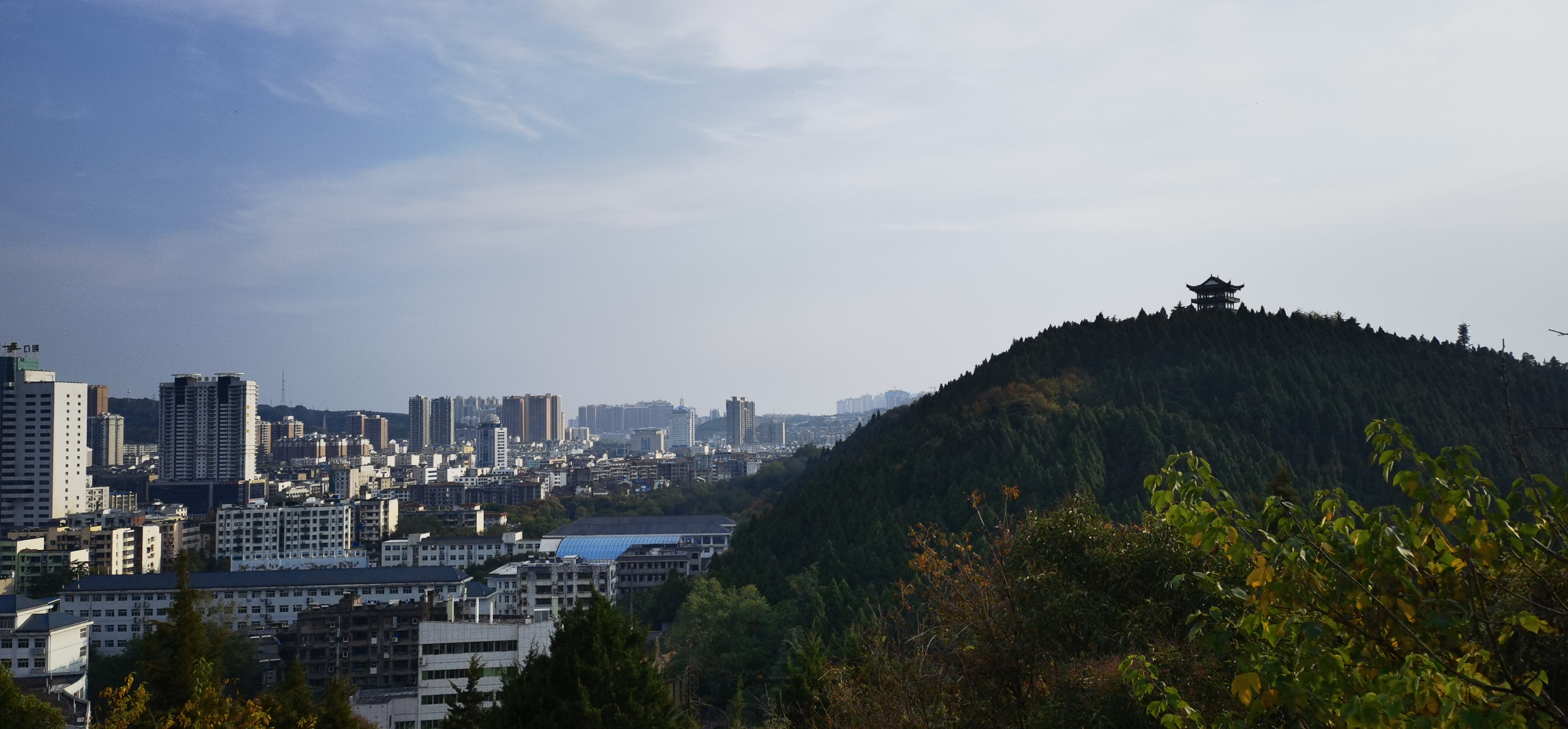
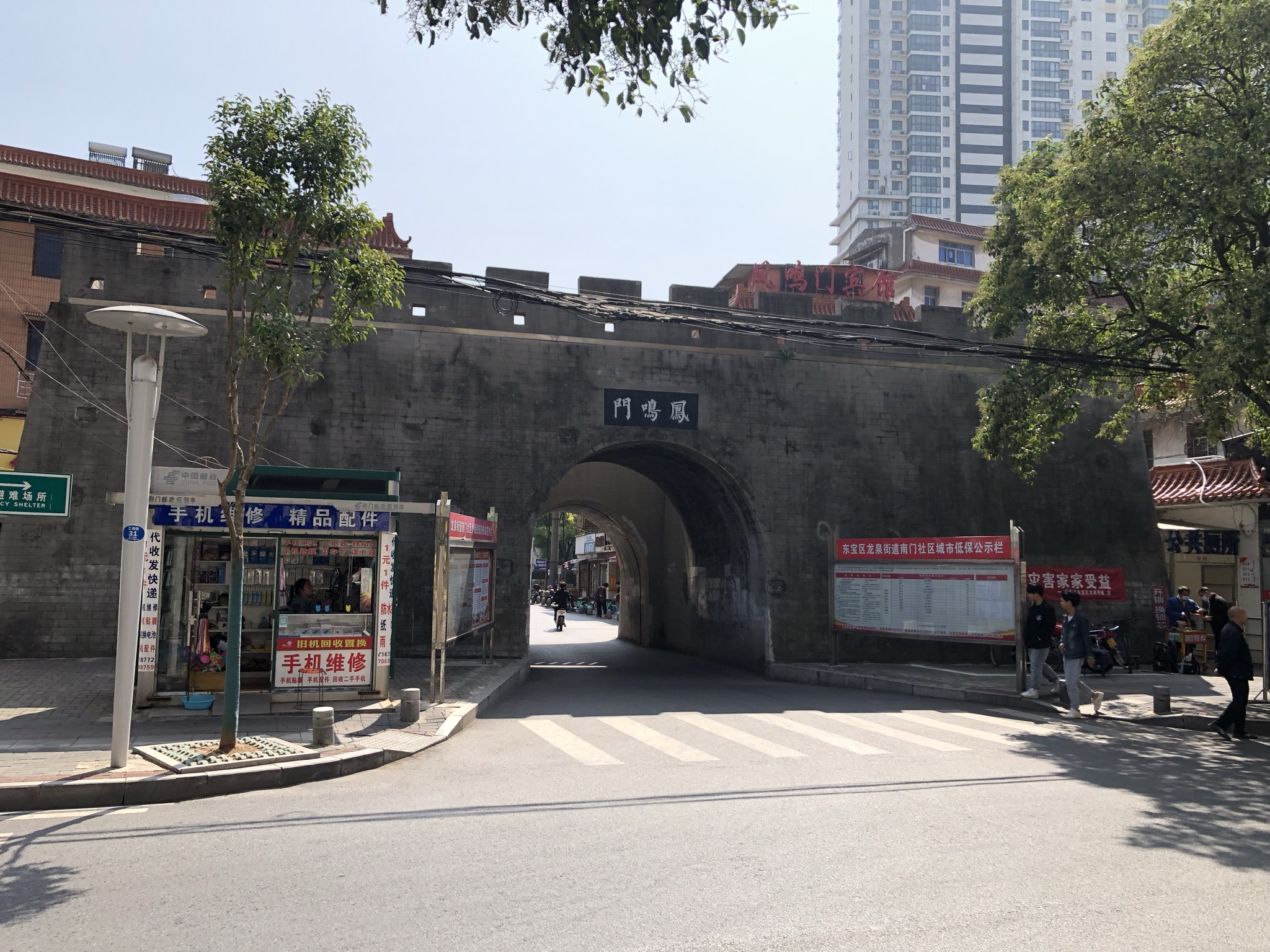
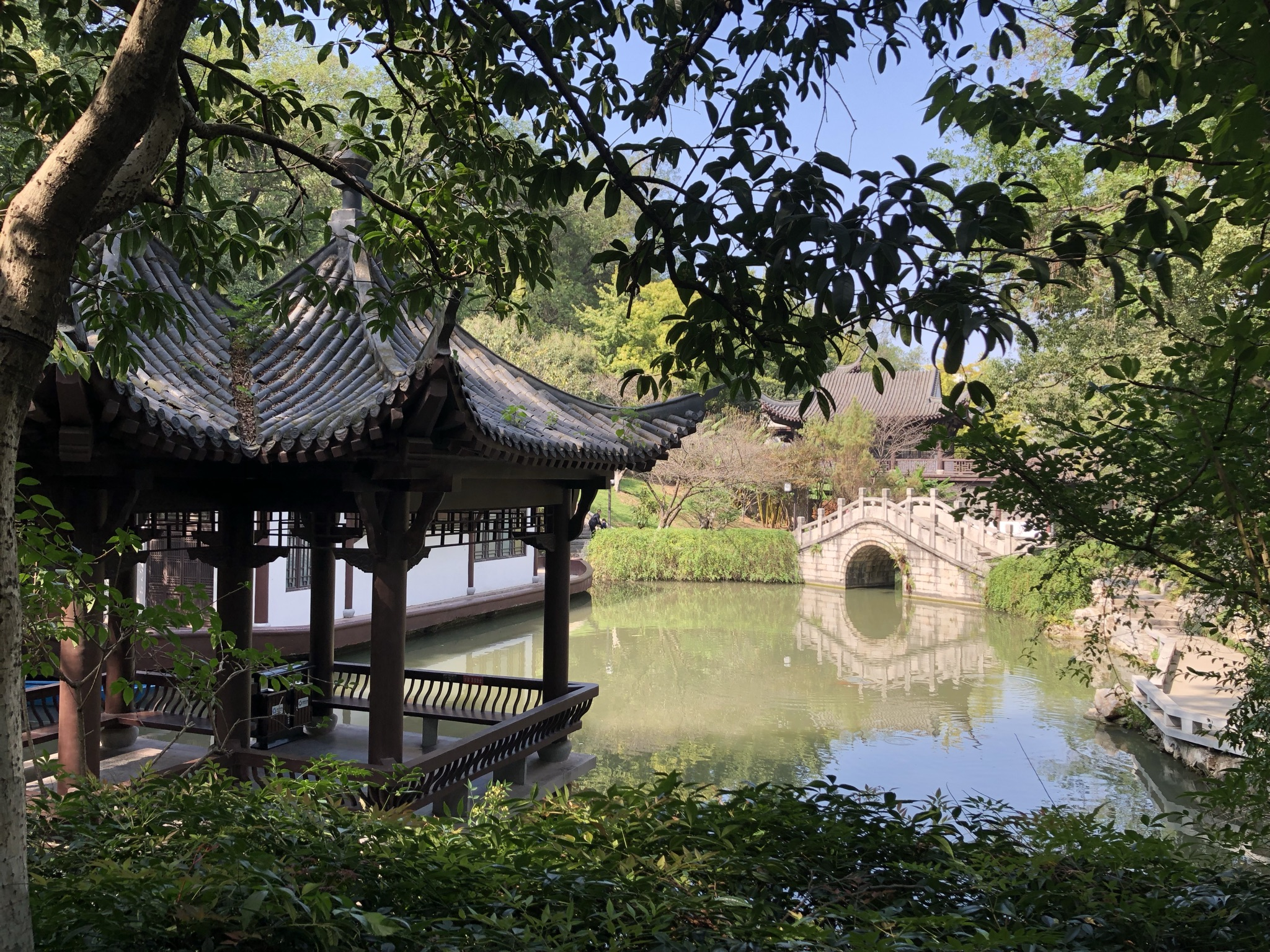
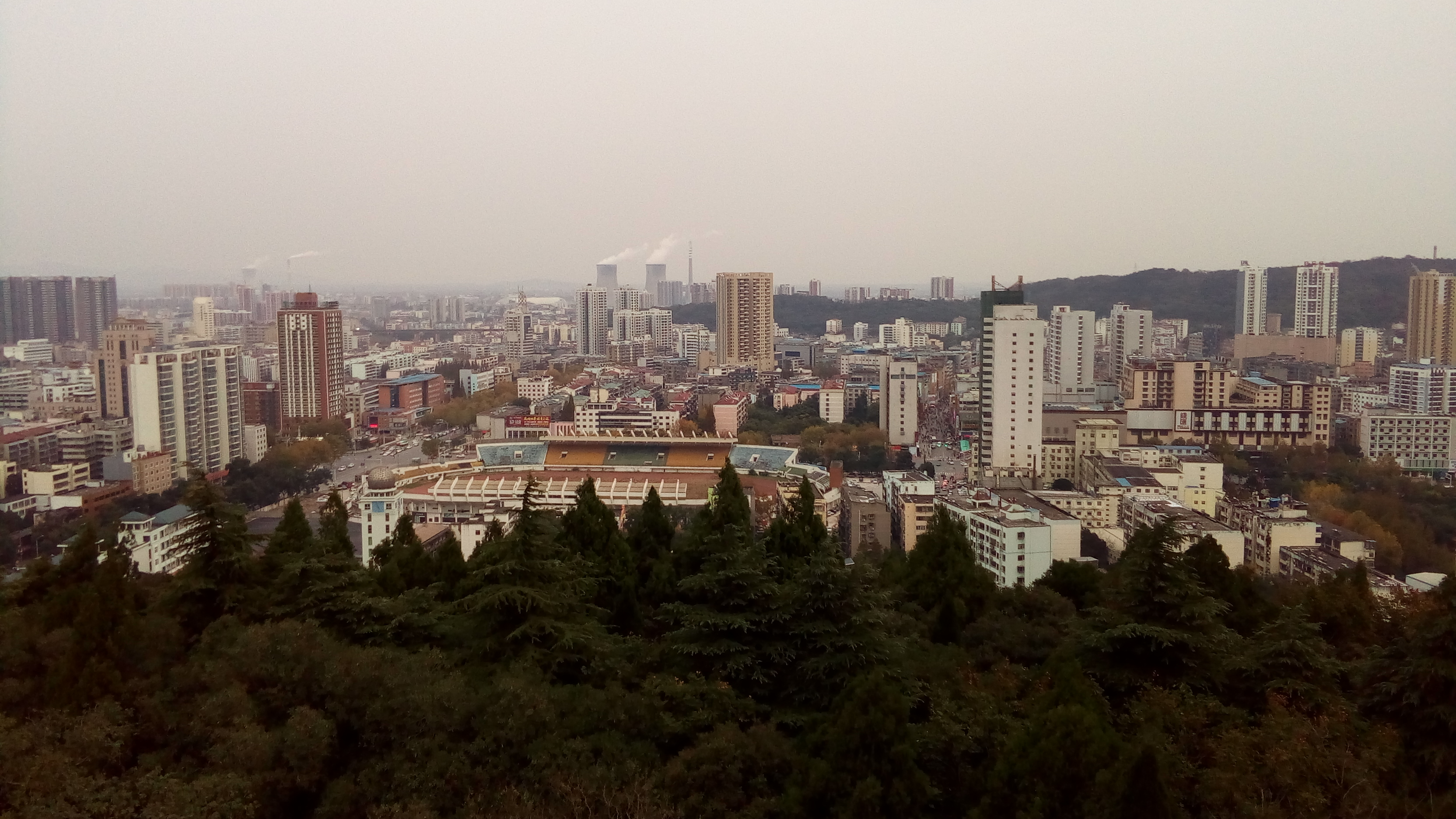
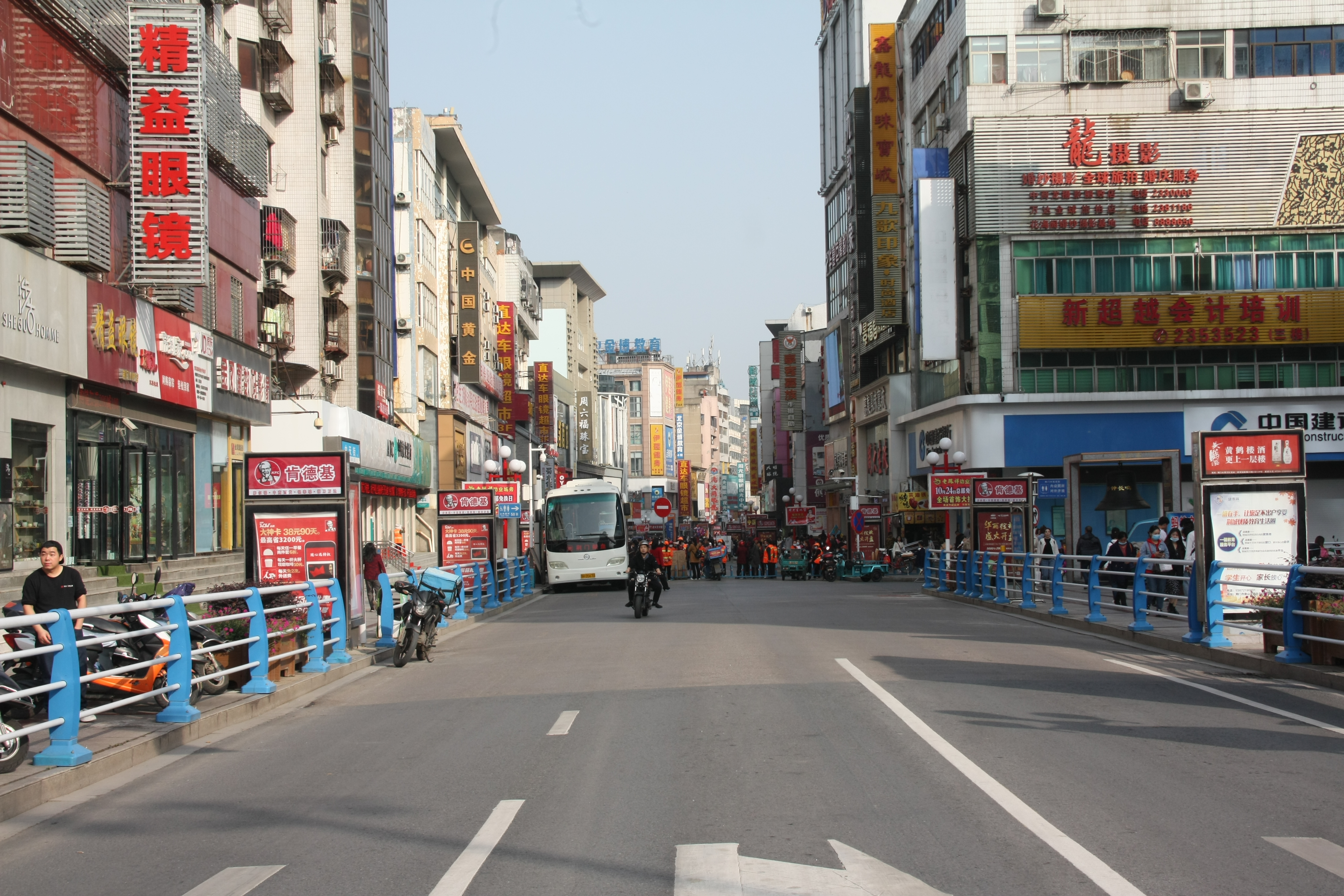
- From top, left to right: View from Bailong Mountain; Nanxun Gate on Zhongtian Street; Pavilion in Longquan Park; View from Languan Pavilion; Street in Dongbao

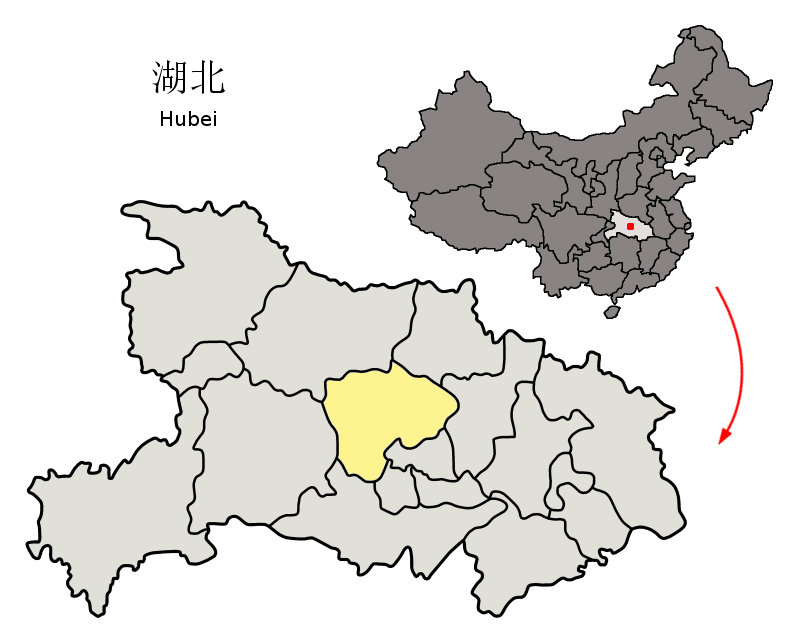
- Location of Jingmen City in Hubei and the PRC

- Location in Hubei
- Coordinates (Jingmen municipal government): 31°02′07″N 112°11′56″E
- Country: People's Republic of China
- Province: Hubei
- Municipal seat: Dongbao District

Area
  - Prefecture-level city: 12,404 km^{2} (4,789 sq mi)
  - Urban (2017): 248.70 km^{2} (96.02 sq mi)
  - Districts: 2,251.9 km^{2} (869.5 sq mi)

Population (2012)
  - Prefecture-level city: 3,023,000
  - Density: 243.7/km^{2} (631.2/sq mi)
  - Urban (2017): 553,400
  - Districts: 915,000

GDP
  - Prefecture-level city: CN¥ 138.8 billion US$ 22.3 billion
  - Per capita: CN¥ 47,999; US$ 7,706
- Time zone: UTC+08:00 (China Standard)
- Postal code: 448000
- Area code: 0724
- ISO 3166 code: CN-HB-08
- Licence plate prefixes: 鄂H
- Website: jingmen.gov.cn

Jingmen (simplified Chinese: 荆门; traditional Chinese: 荆門; pinyin: Jīngmén; Wade–Giles: Ching^{¹}mên^{²}) is a prefecture-level city in central Hubei province, People's Republic of China. Jingmen is within an area where cotton and oil crops are planted. The population of the prefecture is 2,873,687 (2010 population census). The urban area of Jingmen City has a population of about 400,000. It covers an area of 12,400 square kilometers and has a total population of more than 3 million. The maximum horizontal distance from east to west is 155 kilometers and the maximum vertical distance from north to south is 131 kilometers. Jingmen is so named as in ancient times it was the gateway to Jingzhou, one of the Nine Provinces and means literally Gateway to Jingzhou.

Jingmen is located in the middle of Hubei, overlooking Wuhan in the east, the Three Gorges in the west, Xiaoxiang in the south, and Sichuan and Shaanxi in the north. It is known as the "Gateway to Jingchu".

== History ==
Jingmen has a long history. As early as the Neolithic Age, there were human settlements in the three major water systems of Hanjiang, Changhu and Zhanghe.

Dangyang County was established in the Han Dynasty. In the 21st year of Zhenyuan of Tang Dynasty (805), Jingmen County was established and belonged to Jiangling Prefecture. The Jingmen Army was established in the Song Dynasty and became Jingmen Prefecture in the Yuan Dynasty. In the ninth year of Hongwu in the Ming Dynasty (1376), it was reduced to Jingmen County and belonged to Jingzhou Prefecture. In the thirteenth year of Hongwu (1380), it was restored to Jingmen Prefecture. In the eleventh year of Jiajing (1532), it belonged to Chengtian Prefecture. In the Qing Dynasty, it was the Zhili Prefecture of Jingmen. In 1912, it was demoted to a county and belonged to Xiangyang Road. In 1932, it belonged to the Seventh Administrative Supervision District. In 1936, it belonged to the Fourth Administrative Supervision District.

== Administrative divisions ==
Jingmen extends from 111°51′ to 113°29′ east longitude and 30°32′ to 31°36′ north latitude.

Jingmen municipality comprises two districts, two county-level cities, one county and three other non MoCA management areas:

- Dongbao District (东宝区)
- Duodao District (掇刀区)
- Zhongxiang city (钟祥市)
- Jingshan city (京山市)
- Shayang County (沙洋县)
- Jingmen Advanced Technology Area (荆门高新技术产业园区 or 荆门高新区)
- Zhanghe New Area (漳河新区)
- Qujialing Management District (屈家岭管理区)

Map
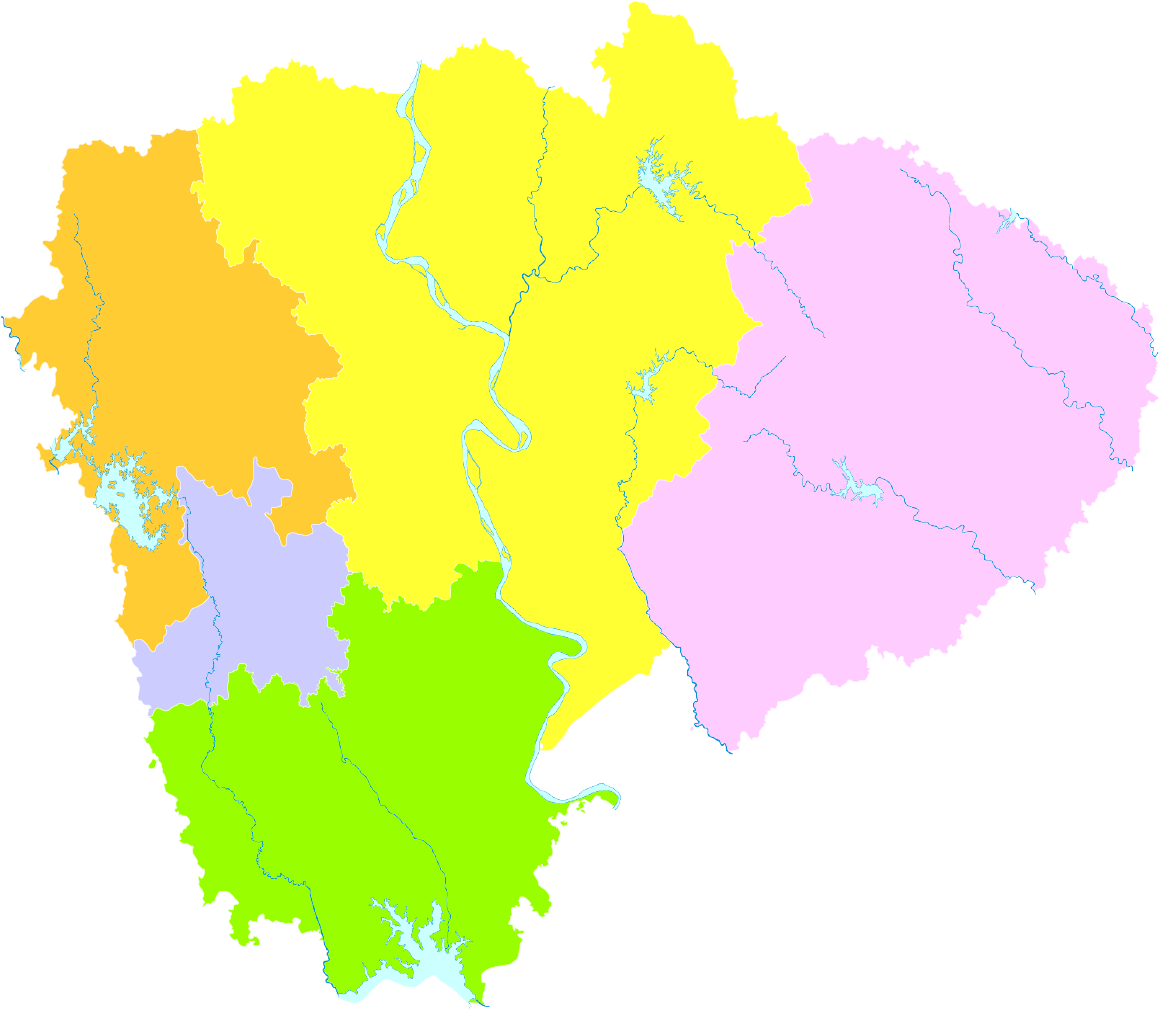

== City layout ==
Dongbao District "downtown" is located about 3 hours away from Wuhan by bus or rail. A new train service was introduced from Jingmen to Wuhan in 2004. Jingmen is very close to many great tourist attractions such as Changban Slope of Three Kingdoms fame, the Wudang Mountains, and the Ming Tomb in Zhongxiang (a World Heritage site only an hour away). As it is located in central China, Jingmen is within easy reach of almost anywhere in the country, taking about 18 hours to either Beijing or Guangzhou by train, or two hours by train to Yichang, home of the Gezhouba Dam project and Three Gorges Dam. From here travellers can fly to many destinations.

The Dongbao District "downtown" has three north–south parallel roads:

- Xiangshan Dadao - The main avenue of Jingmen City. Most governmental buildings are here. Most civil functions, including hospitals, recreational areas, hotels, and the only university in Jingmen - Jingchu University of Technology, are alongside the road.
- Changning Dadao - All big telecommunication companies set up there branches here. Also there are many cellphone shops. The Jingmen railway station is to the north of Changning Dadao.
- Baiyun Dadao - The inner city part of National Highway 207, and a route to the Xiangfan-Jingzhou Highway.
- Jinxia Lu - Not a main avenue, but an important street in the city centre with shops and schools.

Crisscrossing these three roads are the roads Xiangshan 1st to 3rd, so by using these main arteries it is possible to go almost anywhere in Jingmen. Xiangshan 3 road leads behind the Jingmen Foreign Language school and doesn't actually provide a direct link from Xiangshan Dadao to Changning Dadao.

The main commercial area is Zhongtian Street (formerly Jiefang (Liberty) Road), a pedestrian only street, which also crisscrosses the three main roads.

Jingmen is surrounded by hills within easy reach.

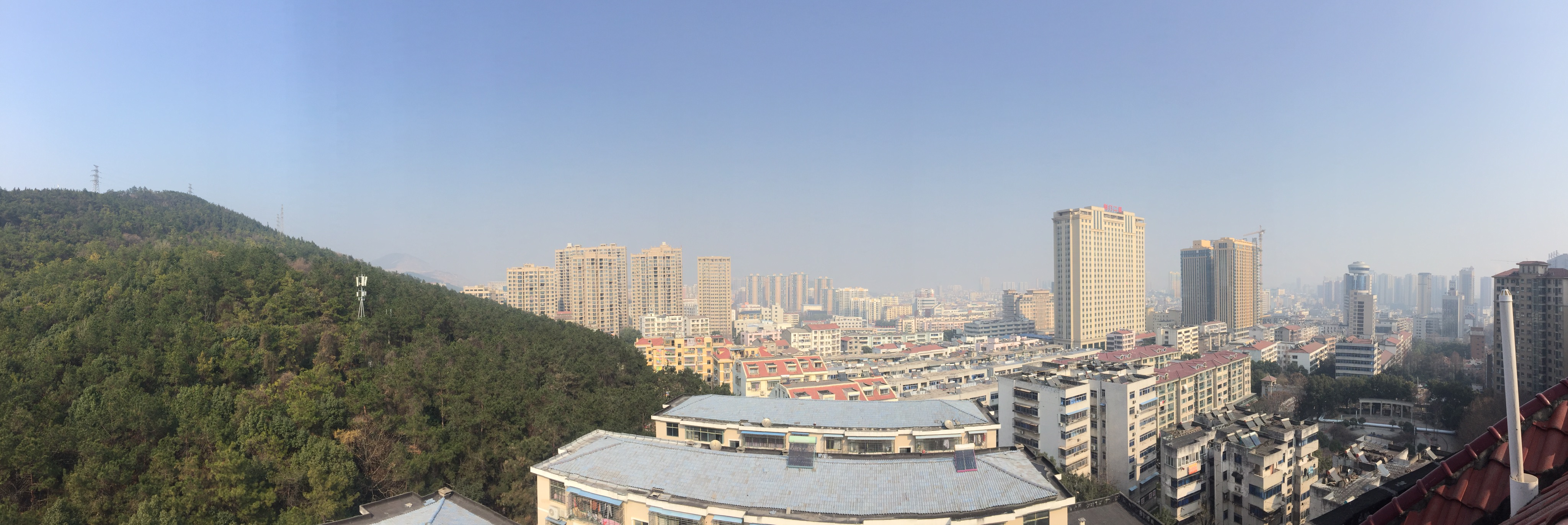
Panorama of Jingmen in 2021

== Climate ==
Jingmen has a typical humid subtropical climate, with January the coldest month and July the hottest month. The temperature goes up to 38 °C at noon with uncomfortable humidity in July, but also goes below 0 °C in winter, with snow every year. Rainfall is high in April to September, with less in autumn and winter. The annual average temperature is 15.6-16.3 °C, the annual sunshine time is 1997-2100h, and the annual average precipitation is 804-1067mm. The first member of the Jingmenvirus group was described in 2014 and named the Jingmen tick virus (JMTV) because it was isolated from a tick sampled in Jingmen.

Climate data for Jingmen, elevation 192 m (630 ft), (1991–2020 normals, extremes 1981–present)
| Month | Jan | Feb | Mar | Apr | May | Jun | Jul | Aug | Sep | Oct | Nov | Dec | Year |
|---|---|---|---|---|---|---|---|---|---|---|---|---|---|
| Record high °C (°F) | 19.9 (67.8) | 24.6 (76.3) | 32.8 (91.0) | 33.9 (93.0) | 36.0 (96.8) | 37.1 (98.8) | 37.9 (100.2) | 38.2 (100.8) | 38.5 (101.3) | 34.0 (93.2) | 28.3 (82.9) | 20.4 (68.7) | 38.5 (101.3) |
| Mean daily maximum °C (°F) | 7.8 (46.0) | 10.8 (51.4) | 15.8 (60.4) | 22.0 (71.6) | 26.6 (79.9) | 29.4 (84.9) | 31.5 (88.7) | 31.3 (88.3) | 27.4 (81.3) | 22.3 (72.1) | 16.0 (60.8) | 10.1 (50.2) | 20.9 (69.6) |
| Daily mean °C (°F) | 4.0 (39.2) | 6.6 (43.9) | 11.2 (52.2) | 17.1 (62.8) | 21.9 (71.4) | 25.4 (77.7) | 27.6 (81.7) | 27.1 (80.8) | 23.0 (73.4) | 17.8 (64.0) | 11.7 (53.1) | 6.2 (43.2) | 16.6 (62.0) |
| Mean daily minimum °C (°F) | 1.1 (34.0) | 3.3 (37.9) | 7.5 (45.5) | 13.1 (55.6) | 18.0 (64.4) | 22.1 (71.8) | 24.5 (76.1) | 23.9 (75.0) | 19.6 (67.3) | 14.3 (57.7) | 8.4 (47.1) | 3.1 (37.6) | 13.2 (55.8) |
| Record low °C (°F) | −8.3 (17.1) | −6.5 (20.3) | −2.2 (28.0) | −0.3 (31.5) | 8.3 (46.9) | 12.8 (55.0) | 17.6 (63.7) | 15.6 (60.1) | 11.0 (51.8) | 2.4 (36.3) | −2.5 (27.5) | −11.0 (12.2) | −11.0 (12.2) |
| Average precipitation mm (inches) | 24.5 (0.96) | 31.0 (1.22) | 50.7 (2.00) | 82.0 (3.23) | 125.6 (4.94) | 137.0 (5.39) | 182.3 (7.18) | 137.6 (5.42) | 69.4 (2.73) | 65.5 (2.58) | 40.4 (1.59) | 16.9 (0.67) | 962.9 (37.91) |
| Average precipitation days (≥ 0.1 mm) | 6.8 | 8.3 | 9.9 | 10.7 | 12.2 | 10.8 | 11.6 | 9.5 | 8.7 | 9.5 | 7.9 | 6.3 | 112.2 |
| Average snowy days | 4.4 | 3.3 | 1.2 | 0 | 0 | 0 | 0 | 0 | 0 | 0 | 0.5 | 2.0 | 11.4 |
| Average relative humidity (%) | 69 | 69 | 70 | 71 | 71 | 77 | 81 | 78 | 73 | 70 | 70 | 67 | 72 |
| Mean monthly sunshine hours | 91.7 | 95.7 | 123.4 | 145.1 | 154.4 | 145.4 | 182.9 | 195.8 | 145.6 | 136.9 | 121.6 | 108.2 | 1,646.7 |
| Percentage possible sunshine | 28 | 30 | 33 | 37 | 36 | 34 | 43 | 48 | 40 | 39 | 39 | 34 | 37 |
Source: China Meteorological Administration

== Education ==
Jingchu University of Technology (Chinese: 荆楚理工学院, JUT), Formerly Jingmen University) founded in early 2007, is the only university in the city of Jingmen. JUT has undergraduate programs on engineering, art, science, management, and nursing. Jingchu University of Technology is a public undergraduate institute approved by China's Ministry of Education. It is located in Jingmen, Hubei, a famous historical and cultural city known as the "Gate of Jingchu". It covers a land area of 147.71 hectares, with a school-building construction area of 300 thousands square meters. It is equipped with different modern teaching and scientific instruments .

Notable high schools include Longquan High School, No. 1 High School of Jingmen City and Dongbao High School. Longquan High School has a good reputation within Hubei province. Notable middle schools include the private Foreign Language School of Jingmen City, Haihui Middle School and Xiangshan Middle School. Notable primary schools include Jingmen Experimental Primary School, Red Flag Primary School of Jingmen City and Daqiao (Rail Bridge) Primary School.

== Transportation ==
Two expressways go through Jingmen, the Wuhan-Jingmen-Yichang Expressway (part of G42 Shanghai-Chengdu Expressway) and the Xiangyang-Jingmen-Jingzhou Expressway (part of G55 Erenhot-Guangzhou Expressway). The Wuhan-Jingmen section has been completed by 2010. The completion halves traveling time between Wuhan and Jingmen to two hours. China National Highway 207 also passes through Jingmen City.

Jingmen station is served by the Jiaozuo–Liuzhou railway and the local Jingmen–Shashi and Changjiangbu–Jingmen railway. Jingmen West railway station, opened in 2024 on the western edge of the city, is served by high-speed services on the Wuhan–Yichang, Xiangyang–Jingmen and the Jingmen–Jingzhou high-speed railways.

The city is served by the Jingmen Zhanghe Airport, which opened in 2018.

== Economy ==
The economy in Jingmen consists mainly of agriculture and industry. The service sector is not as developed as manufacturing.

Jingmen is an important area for rice, cotton, and rapeseed production. An annual event in late March, Jingmen Rape Petal Tourism Festival, exhibits local agricultural production.

The largest industry in Jingmen is petroleum refining. The Jingmen Branch of Sinopec is a main producer of oil products in central China, refining crude oil extracted from Nanyang Oilfield in Henan province and the Jianghan Oilfield in Hubei province.

Jingmen is a developing logistic hub in central China. Li Ning has set up its largest distribution center in Jingmen, to link southeastern production and consumption from all over China.

Other important industries include power generation, production of agricultural chemicals and cement, metal and electronic waste recycling, and beer-making.

On July 30, 2014 the mayor of Jingmen, Xiao Juhua, signed a Sister City agreement with the rural Canadian township of North Glengarry in Eastern Ontario.
