= Alongshan virus =

Tick-borne virus

Alongshan virus (ALSV) is a tick-borne disease discovered in Alongshan, Inner Mongolia in 2017. It is a type of Jingmenvirus. It was discovered in ticks in Finland in 2019 and in Switzerland in 2022. In 2023, it was reported in ticks and animals in Lower Saxony.
