= Wuhan–Yichang high-speed railway =

Railway line in China

Overview
- Native name: 汉宜高速铁路
- Status: Operational
- Owner: China Railway
- Locale: Hubei province
- Termini: Hankou; Yichang North
- Stations: 8

Service
- Type: High-speed rail
- System: China Railway High-speed
- Operator: CR Wuhan

History
- Opened: 26 December 2025

Technical
- Line length: 313.8 km (195.0 mi)
- Num of tracks: 2 (Double-track)
- Track gauge: 1,435 mm (4 ft 8 1/2 in) standard gauge
- Minimum radius: generally 7,000 m (4.3 mi) or 5,500 m (3.4 mi) on difficult sections
- Electrification: 25 kV 50 Hz AC (Overhead line)
- Operating speed: 350 kilometres per hour (220 mph)
- Signalling: ABS
- Maximum incline: 2%

The Wuhan–Yichang high-speed railway (also referred to in Chinese as the Hanyi high-speed railway) is a high-speed railway line between Hankou and Yichang North in China. It is a part of the Shanghai–Chongqing–Chengdu high-speed railway. The line is 314 kilometres (195 miles) long and has a design speed of 350 kilometres per hour (220 mph). On 25 September 2021, the Wuhan–Yichang high-speed railway started construction and it was completed and opened on 26 December 2025.

This line parallels the Wuhan–Yichang railway, which forms part of the Shanghai–Wuhan–Chengdu passenger-dedicated line and was opened in 2012.

== See also ==
- High-speed rail in China
