= Huayuan =

Huayuan may refer to the following locations in China:

- Huayuan County (花垣县), of Xiangxi Prefecture, Hunan
- Huayuan Area (华苑), Nankai District, Tianjin

Towns (花园镇)

- Huayuan, Huoqiu County, in Huoqiu County, Anhui
- Huayuan, Xiaochang County, in Xiaochang County, Hubei
- Huayuan, Dongkou, in Dongkou County, Hunan
- Huayuan, Leling, in Leling City, Shandong
- Huayuan, Pi County, in Pi County, Sichuan
- Huayuan, Santai County, in Santai County, Sichuan
- Huayuan, Yuechi County, in Yuechi County, Sichuan

Village (花园村)

- Huayuan, a village in Wenquan, Yingshan County, Huanggang, Hubei
- Huayuan, a village in Xinghua Township, Hong'an County, Huanggang, Hubei
