= Ehuang Yangtze River Bridge =

Ehuang Yangtze River Bridge 鄂黄长江大桥
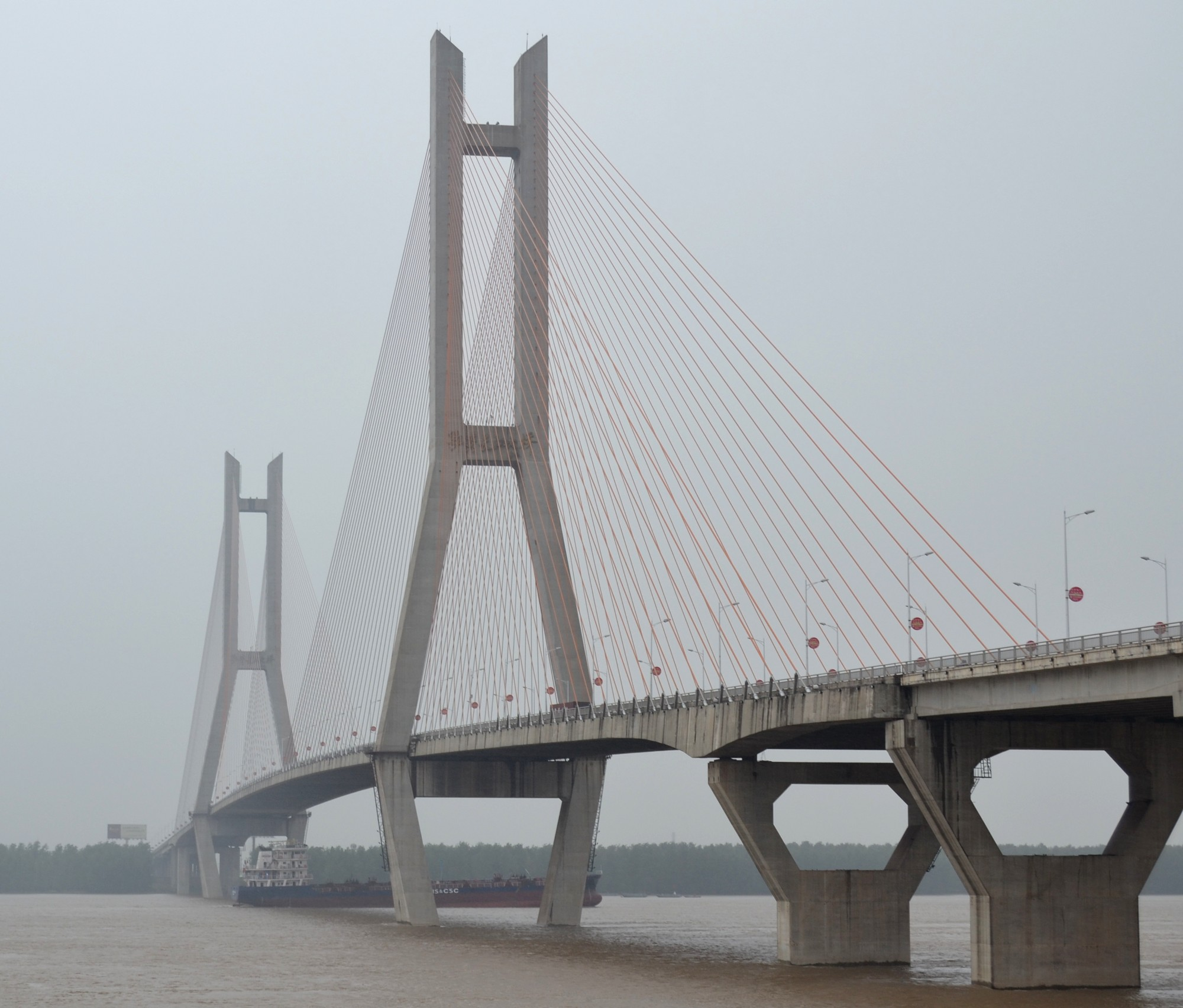
- Coordinates: 30.412114°N 114.919395°E
- Carries: China National Highway 106
- Crosses: Yangtze River
- Locale: Ezhou · Huanggang, Hubei, China

Characteristics
- Design: Cable-stayed
- Total length: 3,245 m (10,646 ft)
- Longest span: 480 m (1,570 ft)

History
- Construction start: 1999
- Opened: 2002

Location
- Interactive map of Ehuang Yangtze River Bridge

The Ehuang Yangtze River Bridge (Chinese: 鄂黄长江大桥) crosses the Yangtze River in Hubei, China. The bridge carries traffic on China National Highway 106 between Echeng, Ezhou south of the river and Huangzhou, Huanggang to the north. Construction of the bridge started in 1999 and it was completed in 2002. The bridge is 3,245 m (10,646 ft) long and has a main span of 480 m (1,570 ft) placing it among the longest cable-stayed bridges in the world.

== See also ==
- Yangtze River bridges and tunnels
- List of largest cable-stayed bridges
