= Wang Qiuliang =

Chinese scientist (born 1965)

- 王秋良
- Born: 1965 (age 60–61); Xishui County, Hubei, China
- Education: Hubei University
- Scientific career
- Fields: Strong electromagnetic engineering and technology
- Workplaces: Institute of Electrical Engineering, Chinese Academy of Sciences

Wang Qiuliang (Chinese: 王秋良; pinyin: Wáng Qiūliáng; born 1965) is a Chinese scientist currently serving as a researcher and doctoral supervisor at the Institute of Electrical Engineering, Chinese Academy of Sciences. He is a member of the China Society of Electrical Engineering (CSEE) and China Electrotechnical Society (CES).

== Education ==
Wang was born in the town of Tuanpo, Xishui County, Hubei in 1965. In 1986 he graduated from Hubei University, where he majored in the Department of Physics. He received his master's degree from the Institute of Plasma Physics, Chinese Academy of Sciences in 1991 and doctor of engineering degree from the Institute of Electrical Engineering, Chinese Academy of Sciences in 1994. He was a postdoctoral fellow at Kyushu University.

== Career ==
From 1996 to 1997, with the support of the Ministry of Science and Technology (South Korea), he worked at Korea Electric Research Institute. He was recruited by Samsung as a senior researcher, a position in which he remained until 2000. In 2000 he moved to Oxford Instruments as a senior engineer, he remained there until 2002. In 2003 he became a guest professor at GSI Helmholtz Centre for Heavy Ion Research, but having held the position for only one year.

Wang returned to China in 2006. He is a researcher and doctoral supervisor at the Institute of Electrical Engineering, Chinese Academy of Sciences. He works as a professor at the University of Chinese Academy of Sciences.

== Contributions ==
In December 2019, Wang led the team to successfully develop a superconducting magnet with a central magnetic field of 32.35 tesla (T). The magnet adopts the self-developed high-temperature inserted magnet technology, which breaks the world record of 32.0 tesla superconducting magnet created by the National Strong Magnetic Field Laboratory of the United States in December 2017, marking that China's high field inserted magnet technology has reached the world's leading level.

== Honours and awards ==
- Fellow of the Institute of Electrical and Electronics Engineers (IEEE)
- 2009 National Science Fund for Distinguished Young Scholars
- November 22, 2019 Member of the Chinese Academy of Sciences (CAS)
