= Tropical Storm Maysak =

Western Pacific tropical storm in 2026

Severe Tropical Storm Maysak (Henry)
- Maysak at peak intensity shortly after landfall in South China late on July 4

Meteorological history
- Formed: June 30, 2026
- Dissipated: July 7, 2026

Severe tropical storm
- 10-minute sustained (JMA)
- Highest winds: 95 km/h (60 mph)
- Lowest pressure: 985 hPa (mbar); 29.09 inHg

Tropical storm
- 1-minute sustained (SSHWS/JTWC)
- Highest winds: 95 km/h (60 mph)
- Lowest pressure: 988 hPa (mbar); 29.18 inHg

Overall effects
- Fatalities: 171+
- Injuries: 331+
- Missing: 10+
- Damage: ≥$3.35 billion (2026 USD)
- Areas affected: Philippines, Vietnam, Laos, China
- Part of the 2026 Pacific typhoon season

Severe Tropical Storm Maysak (Note: The name Maysak (Khmer: ម៉ៃសាក់, [maj.ˈsaʔ]) was contributed by Cambodia and means teak (Tectona grandis) in Khmer.) was a small but deadly tropical cyclone that struck the Chinese province of Hainan and later Northern Vietnam in early July 2026. It was the tenth named storm of the 2026 Pacific typhoon season.

Maysak originated from an area of convection that developed east-southeast of Manila on June 29. On July 1, PAGASA upgraded the system into a tropical depression, assigning the local name Henry. The Japan Meteorological Agency (JMA) followed suit on the same day while the system was moving northwestwards. The Joint Typhoon Warning Center (JTWC) also followed suit afterwards, designating Henry as 10W. On July 2, JMA upgraded Henry into a tropical storm, as it was assigned the name Maysak. Maysak made landfall near Lingshui, Hainan Province on July 3. On July 4, the JMA upgraded Maysak into a severe tropical storm, before it made its final landfall over Móng Cái, Quảng Ninh province. In Vietnam, Maysak was known as Typhoon No. 1 of 2026 (Bão số 1 năm 2026).

The remnants of Maysak spawned a significant tornado outbreak in southeastern and eastern China, claiming the lives of 12 people and injured 331. Overall, at least ten tornadoes were reported during this outbreak. Meanwhile, 159 people were killed from a flooding in Guangxi and caused an estimated damage amounted to ¥22.18 billion (US$3.28 billion). In Vietnam, total reported damage was estimated to US$1.07 million.

== Meteorological history ==
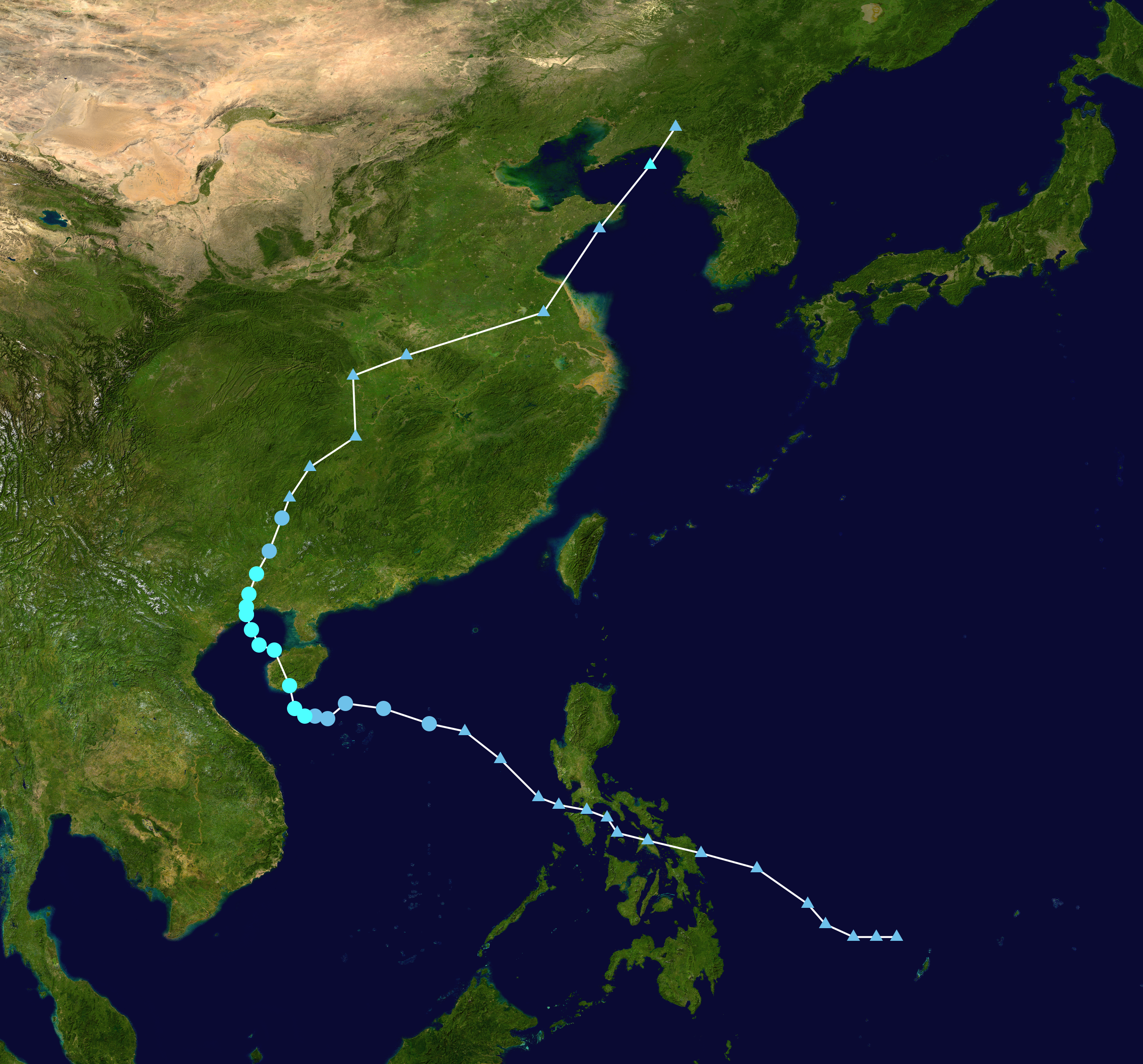
Map plotting the storm's track and intensity, according to the Saffir–Simpson scale Map key Saffir–Simpson scale Tropical depression (≤38 mph, ≤62 km/h) Tropical storm (39–73 mph, 63–118 km/h) Category 1 (74–95 mph, 119–153 km/h) Category 2 (96–110 mph, 154–177 km/h) Category 3 (111–129 mph, 178–208 km/h) Category 4 (130–156 mph, 209–251 km/h) Category 5 (≥157 mph, ≥252 km/h) Unknown Storm type Tropical cyclone Subtropical cyclone Extratropical cyclone, remnant low, tropical disturbance, or monsoon depression

On June 29, an area of convection had developed 591 nm (1,095 km) of Manila, with satellite imagery indicating an elongated low-level circulation center (LLCC) with disorganized convection throughout the northern periphery, citing a medium potential of tropical cyclogenesis. At 02:00 PHT of July 1 (18:00 UTC of June 30), PAGASA upgraded the disturbance into a tropical depression as it crossed over southern Luzon, with the system being assigned the local name Henry. Meanwhile, at 21:00 UTC, JTWC upgraded its chances to high, prompting to issue a TCFA warning as Henry moved through favorable conditions. Early on July 1, the JMA classified Henry as a tropical depression, citing poor positional accuracy due to an obscure cloud system center (CSC), while inside a neutral environment under the influence of high sea-surface temperatures (SSTS), high tropical cyclone heat potential, good upper-level outflow, and dry air. By 18:00 UTC, the system started moving west-northwestwards along the southwestern periphery of a mid-level subtropical high. At 21:00 UTC, the JTWC followed suit, designating Henry as 10W.

By 06:00 UTC, Henry entered a favorable environment for development, although its limited firmness of its structure caused the system to maintain its intensity. Multispectral satellite imagery (MSI) depicted the system with an exposed LLCC that was removed from the sheared convection to the southeast. However, shortly after, Henry returned to a neutral environment for development, with water vapor imagery showing dry air in the system's movement, active convective cloud clusters around the CSC. However, by 15:00 UTC, the system started to reorganize itself around the broader-surrounding cyclonic circulation. At 18:00 UTC, JMA upgraded Henry into a tropical storm, assigning the name Maysak to the system. Later, Maysak exhibited multiple vortices wrapping around a cyclonic rotation that is south of Hainan. Early on July 3, the storm obtained good cloud characteristics of anticyclonic outflow while slowly moving north-northwestward. By 03:00 UTC, the JTWC upgraded Maysak into a tropical storm, with animated MSI depicting some slow consolidation with an irregular central dense overcast (CDO) overlaying an obscured LLCC. At 10:20 UTC, Maysak made its first landfall near Lingshui, Hainan Province. Satellite imagery then depicted the storm with a compact vortex with deep convection over the LLCC in the southwestern quadrant.

Early on July 4, MSI showed that the storm's cumulonimbus clusters began forming a curved band around the CSC, before moving to a marginally favorable, thermodynamic and kinematic environment characterized by high tropospheric moisture content, and sustained moderate upper-level divergence. As Maysak moved through the Gulf of Tonkin, the JMA upgraded it into a severe tropical storm before the system made its second and final landfall in Móng Cái, Quảng Ninh province on July 4 at 12:30 UTC. At 15:00 UTC, the JTWC issued their final reasoning on Maysak as the storm starts containing rich deep-layer moisture and land interaction. Maysak later moved inland, causing the JMA to downgrade it to a tropical depression on July 5 at 18:00 UTC. At the same time, JMA issued its final warning as Maysak moved further inland, tracking north-northeastwards.

== Preparations ==
=== Philippines ===
On July 1, at 05:00 PHT (21:00 UTC of the previous day), PAGASA issued Tropical Cyclone Wind Signal No. 1 in the southwestern portion of Zambales, eastern portion of Bataan, and Lubang Islands. All wind signals were halted six hours later.

=== Hong Kong and Macau ===
On July 1, the Meteorological and Geophysical Bureau (SMG) issued Signal No. 1 at 23:00 MST (15:00 UTC). On July 2, the Hong Kong Observatory (HKO) issued the Standby Signal No. 1 at 07:40 HKT (23:40 UTC). On July 3, the SMG issued Signal No. 3 at 20:00 MST (12:00 UTC). On July 4, the HKO cancelled all Tropical Cyclone Warning Signals at 03:20 HKT (19:20 UTC) and issued the Strong Monsoon Signal immediately afterwards. At 06:00 MST (22:00 UTC), the SMG issued Signal No. 1. At 12:30 MST (04:30 UTC), the SMG canceled Signal No. 1. At 16:45 HKT (08:45 UTC), the HKO canceled the Strong Monsoon Signal.

== Impact ==
=== Vietnam ===
In Vietnam, strong winds from Maysak uprooted trees and ripped metal roofs off buildings in Móng Cái, and caused US$1.07 million worth of damage in the country.

=== Laos ===
Maysak and Typhoon Bavi triggered severe flooding in Khounkham district, Khammouane province in Laos. Total losses in Khounkham district reached LAK 39.7 billion (about USD 1.75 million).

=== China ===
In Guangxi, Nanning and Guigang, flooding killed 159 people, left ten missing and had affected more than 1.65 million people; 26 of the deaths were related to a dam breach in Nanning. Severe flooding also submerged cars and trapped people in Fangchenggang while in Dongxing, trees were uprooted by strong winds. The storm also spawned 10 tornadoes in China, including one in Hubei, an EF3 tornado related to Maysak killed 12 people, injured 331, and damaged 23000 buildings. Damage in Guigang, Guangxi totaled to ¥560 million (US$82.3 million). Two sections of a dam in the Liulan Reservoir of Hengzhou collapsed on July 6, which sent a massive torrent downstream. The figure was later revised as total damage in Guangxi Province amounted to ¥22.18 billion (US$3.28 billion).

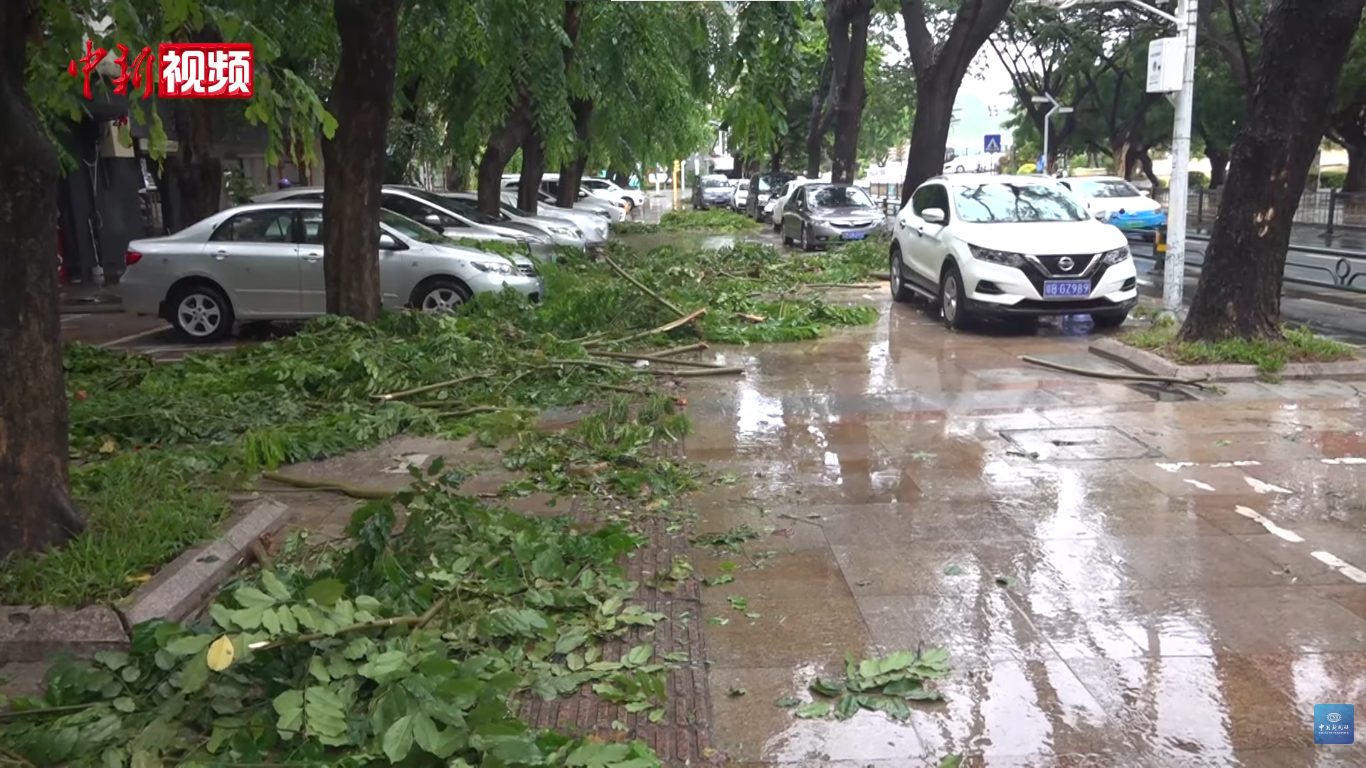
Sanya endured a night of wind and rain, due to Maysak.

Wind gusts of 32.6 metres per second (73 mph) (level 11) were recorded in Haitang District, Sanya City, in the coastal region of Guangdong. Generally, winds were strong at levels 7–9 with gusts of 10–11, and some areas experienced gusts of 11–13. In Guangxi, strong winds of levels 10–11 were observed in the Gulf of Tonkin and along the coast of Fangcheng Port and Qinzhou prefectures, with localized gusts reaching level 12 or higher. Gusts in Jiangshan Town, Fangcheng District, Fangcheng Port City reached 46.9 metres per second (105 mph) (level 15). Very heavy rainfall occurred in Guangxi; Nanping Yao Township (Shangsi County, Fangcheng Port City) recorded a total accumulated rainfall of 671.9 mm (26.45 in) in 24 hours, while Shafu Town (Qinnan District, Qinzhou City) recorded a peak hourly rainfall of 186.2 mm (7.33 in).

==== Confirmed tornadoes ====
Confirmed tornadoes by Enhanced Fujita rating
EFU	EF0	EF1	EF2	EF3	EF4	EF5	Total
0	1	3	0	3	0	0	10

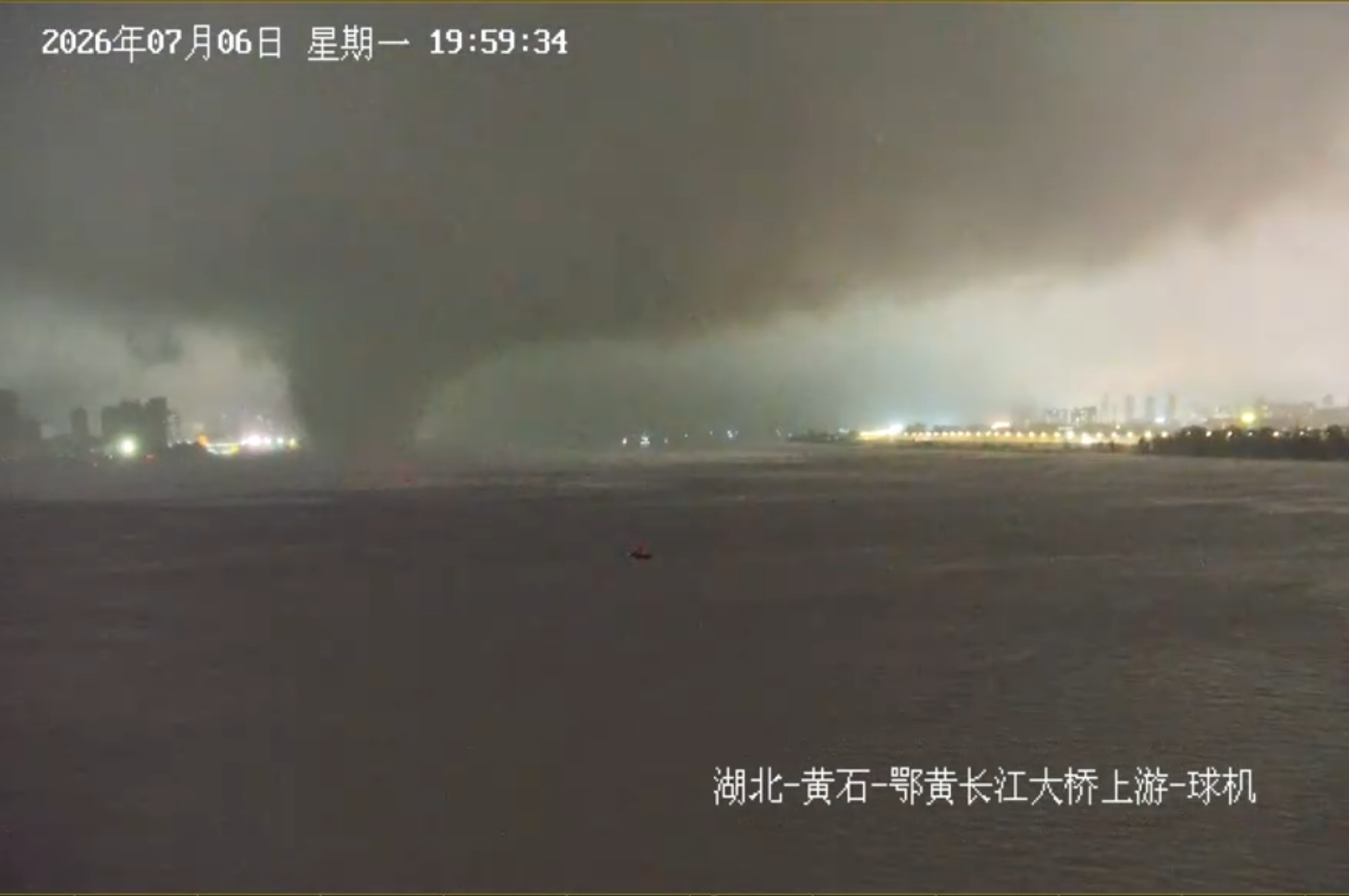
A deadly EF3 tornado near Ezhou, China

Severe thunderstorms associated with the remnants of Severe Tropical Storm Maysak caused a small tornado outbreak in southeastern China and eastern China. Two tornadoes struck the Baiyun and Huadu districts of Guangzhou on July 4–5. The first tornado hit Baiyun District on July 4 and was rated EF0; the second tornado struck both Baiyun and Huadu on July 5, tearing off large areas of sheet‑metal factory roofs and uprooting or snapping numerous trees, and was rated EF1. On July 6, the outbreak intensified. A tornado was confirmed in Qinzhou, Guangxi. Later in the day, an EF1 tornado struck Qingyuan, Guangdong. That evening, two deadly EF3 tornadoes struck populated areas in Hubei Province. The first EF3 tornado touched down near Xianning and moved through Daye, causing severe damage to a brick‑and‑concrete building, killing two people and injuring 53 before lifting near Ezhou. The second, widely documented, EF3 tornado touched down in Ezhou before crossing the Yangtze into Huanggang. This tornado killed 12 people and injured 331. The total damage reached ¥450 million (US$66 million). It collapsed walls of houses and damaged residential buildings, public facilities, windows, doors and the exterior facades of buildings and facilities on the campus of Huanggang Normal University. Many trees were uprooted and a power and water outage occurred. An EF1 tornado also struck Yangxin in Huangshi on the same day. On July 7, an EF3 tornado passed through Huainan, Hefei, and Chuzhou in Anhui, followed by one unrated in Sihong County, Jiangsu, and another in Hongze District, Jiangsu. Overall, at least ten tornadoes occurred during this outbreak.

List of confirmed tornadoes
EF#	Location	Country	Subdivision	Date	Time (UTC)	Path length	Max. width
EF0	Baiyun	China	Guangdong	July 4	~14:10		
EF0	Preliminary information.						
EF1	Baiyun, Huadu	China	Guangdong	July 5	~18:30		
EF1	Preliminary information.						
EF?	Qinnan	China	Guangxi	July 6	~05:00		
EF?	Preliminary information.						
EF1	Qingxin	China	Guangdong	July 6	~08:40		
EF1	Preliminary information.						
EF3	Xianning, Daye, Huangshi, Ezhou	China	Hubei	July 6	~10:50		
EF3	2 deaths – There were 51 injuries. Preliminary information.						
EF3	Ezhou, Huanggang	China	Hubei	July 6	~12:00		
EF3	11 deaths – There were 331 injuries. Preliminary information.						
EF1	Yangxin, Huangshi	China	Hubei	July 6	~13:00		
EF1	Preliminary information.						
EF3	Huainan, Hefei, Chuzhou	China	Anhui	July 7	~21:00		
EF3	An EF3 tornado was confirmed. Preliminary information.						
EF?	Sihong County	China	Jiangsu	July 7	~23:20		
EF?	Preliminary information.						
EF?	Hongze	China	Jiangsu	July 7	~04:00		
EF?	Preliminary information.						

== See also ==
- Weather of 2026
- Tropical cyclones in 2026
- Tropical Storm Toraji (2007) – A weaker system which affected the same areas 19 years prior and had a similar path.
- Tropical Storm Prapiroon (2024) – Had a similar track and intensity.
- Tropical Storm Wutip (2025) – Affected the same areas one year prior, whilst taking a strikingly similar path.
