= Xishui =

Xishui may refer to several places in China:

- Xishui County, Guizhou (习水县), county of Zunyi, Guizhou
- Xishui County, Hubei (浠水县), county of Huanggang, Hubei
