= Huangzhou, Huanggang =

Huangzhou 黄州区 Hwangchow, Hoang-tcheou
- District
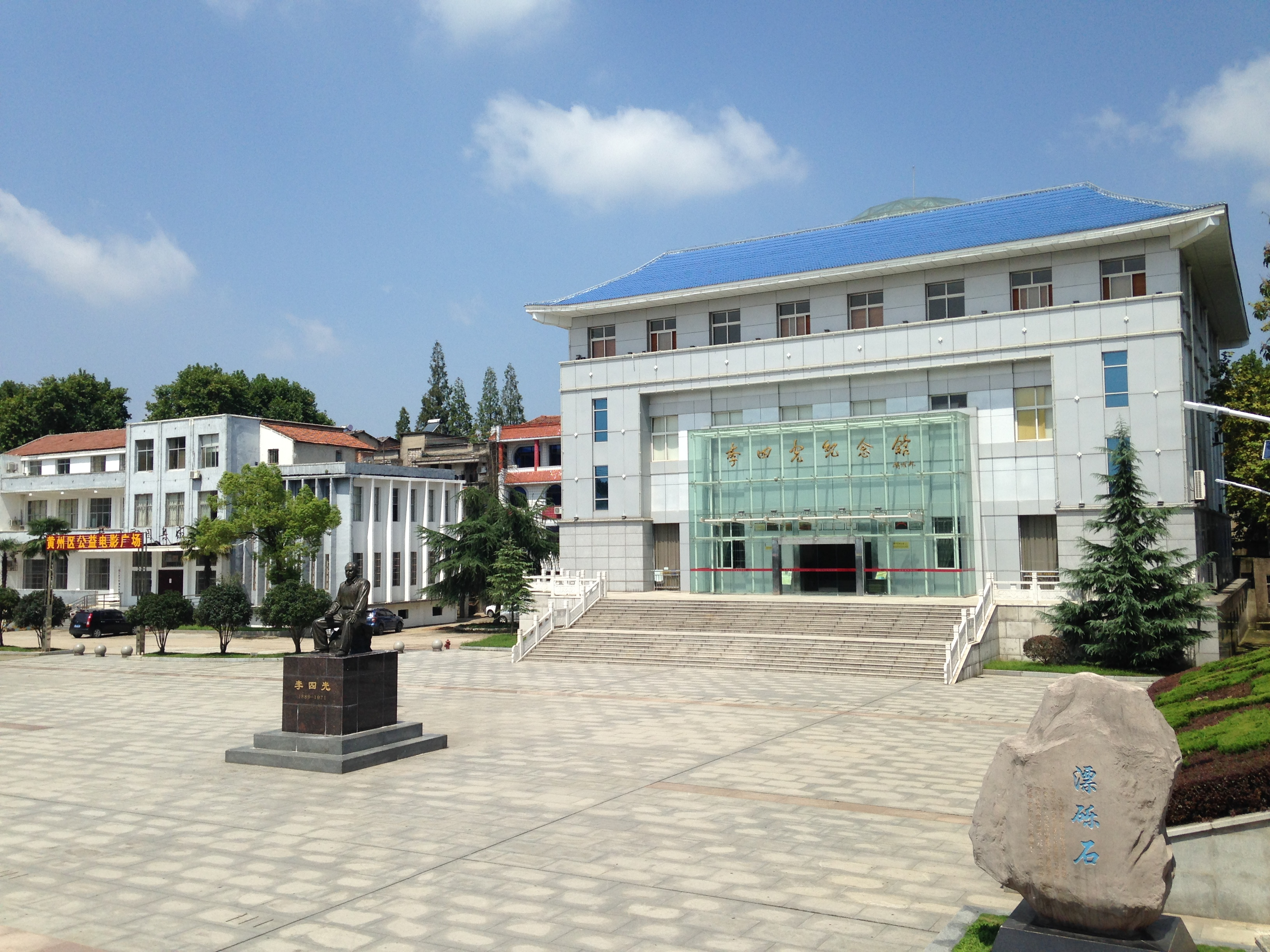
- Li Siguang Memorial Museum

- Location in Hubei
- Coordinates: 30°26′02″N 114°52′44″E
- Country: China
- Province: Hubei
- Prefecture-level city: Huanggang

Area
  - Total: 362.37 km^{2} (139.91 sq mi)

Population (2020 census)
  - Total: 456,862
  - Density: 1,260.8/km^{2} (3,265.4/sq mi)
- Time zone: UTC+8 (China Standard)
- Division code: HZC
- Website: www.huangzhou.gov.cn

Huangzhou, Huanggang
- Traditional Chinese: 黃州區
- Simplified Chinese: 黄州区
- Literal meaning: District of the Yellow Prefectural Seat
Transcriptions
Standard Mandarin
- Hanyu Pinyin: Huángzhōu Qū
- Wade–Giles: Huang-chou Ch‘ü

Huangzhou District is an urban district of Huanggang, Hubei province, China.

== History ==
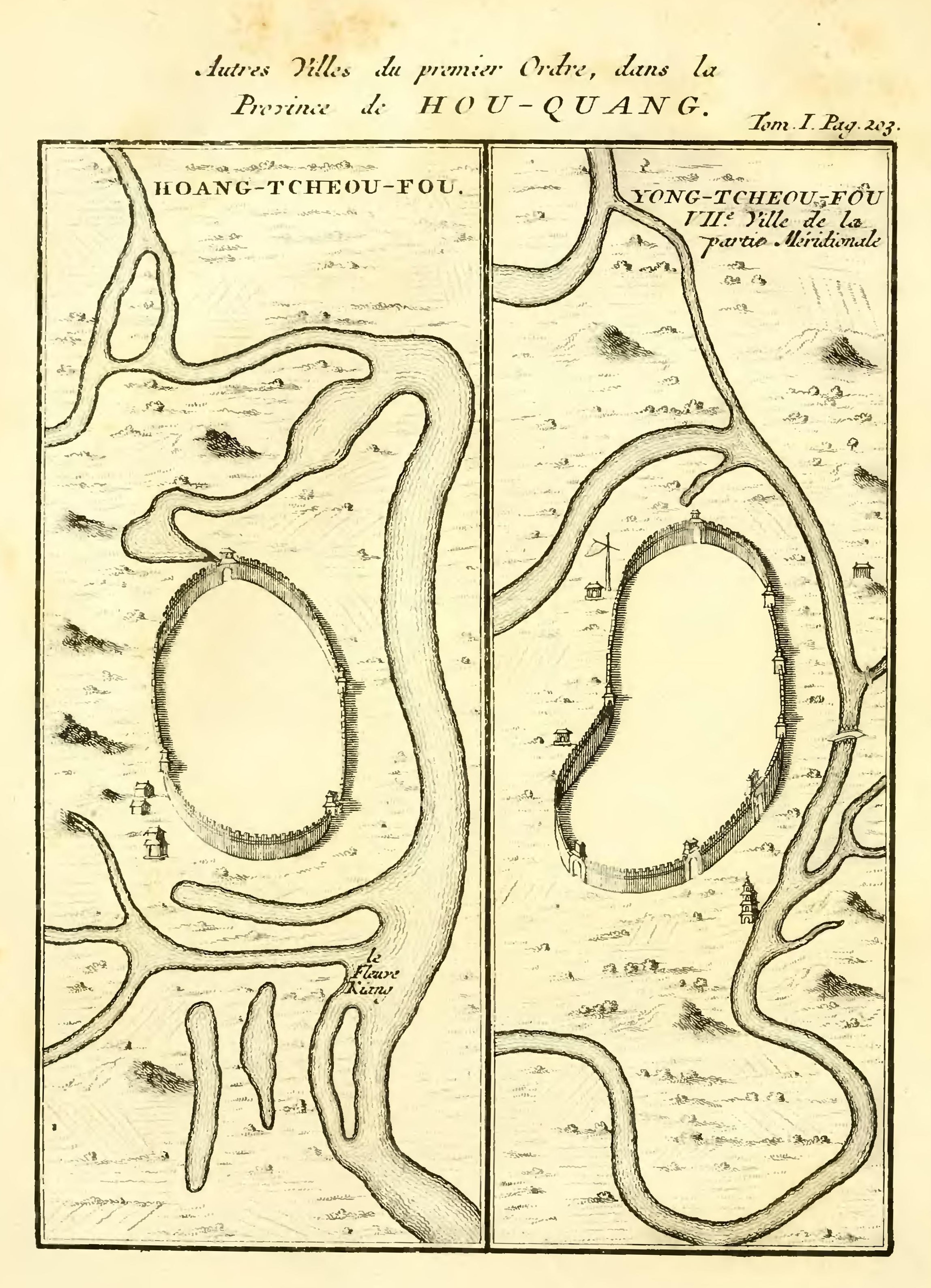
Maps of "Hoang-tcheou-fou" and "Yong-tcheou-fou" from Du Halde's 1735 Description of China, based on accounts by Jesuit missionaries.

In 845 BC Marquis Wen 文侯 Huang Meng 黃孟 (aka Huang Zhang 黃璋) moved the capital of the State of Huang from Yicheng to Huangchuan (present-day Huangchuan, Henan). Huang Xi's descendants ruled State of Huang until 648 BC when it was destroyed by the State of Chu. The Marquis of Huang, Marquis Mu 穆侯 Huang Qisheng 黃企生, fled to the state of Qi. The people of Huang were forced to relocate to Chu. They settled in the region of present-day Hubei province, in a region known as the Jiangxia Prefecture 江夏郡 during the Han dynasty (206 BC-AD 220). There are many places in this region today that were named after Huang e.g. Huanggang, Huangpi, Huangmei, Huangshi, Huang'an (now Hong'an), Huangzhou etc. A large number of the people of Huang were also relocated to regions south of the Yangtze River.

Huangzhou was previously a separate city which administered a prefecture in its own right. Huanggang Middle School and the campuses of Huanggang Normal University are located in Huangzhou.

== Geography ==
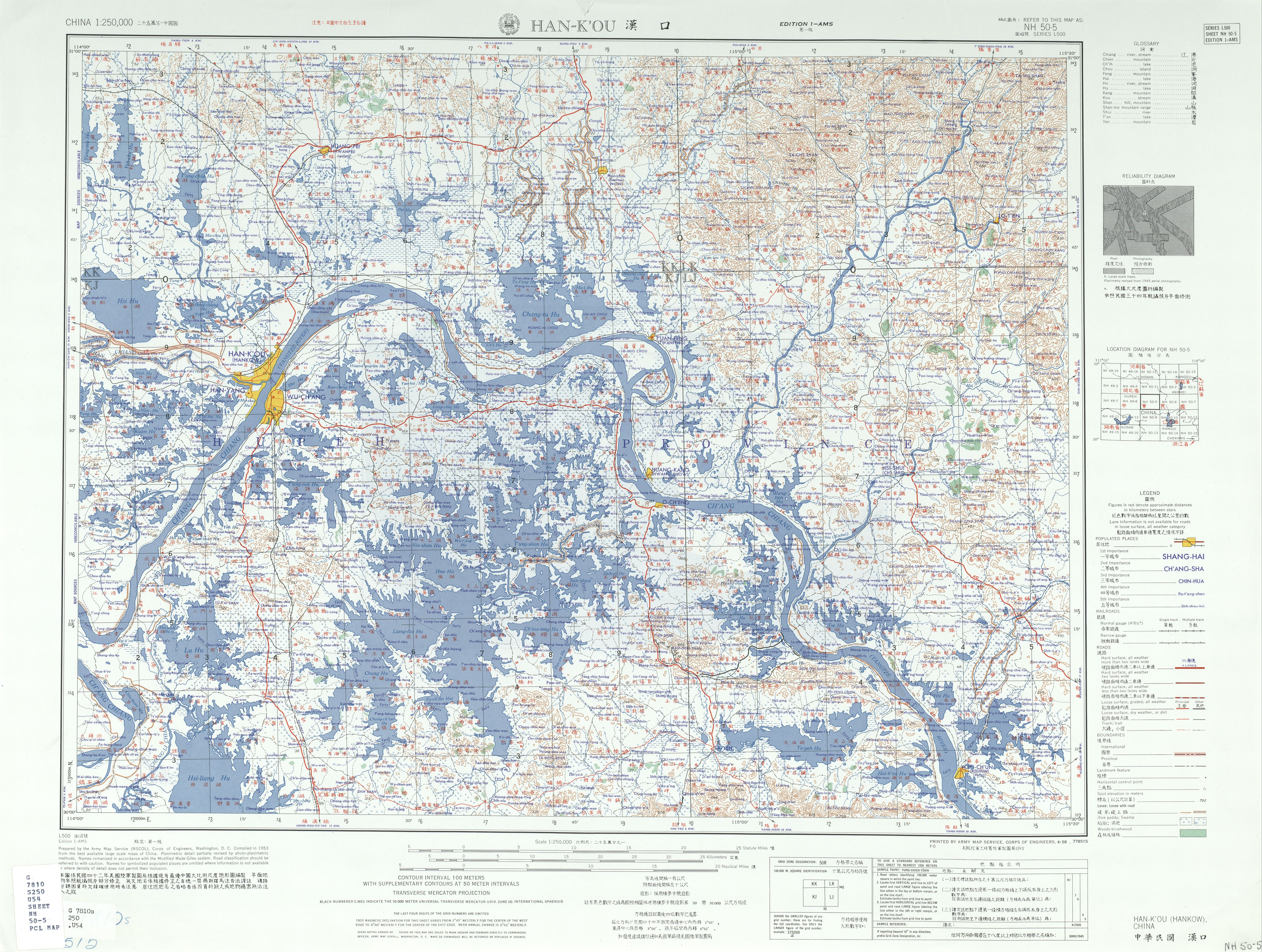
Map including Huangzhou (labeled as HUANG-KANG (HWANG CHOW) (walled) 黃岡) (1953)

=== Administrative Divisions ===
Huangzhou District administers 5 subdistricts, 3 towns and 1 township:

Subdistricts

- Chibi Subdistrict (赤壁街道)
- Donghu Subdistrict (东湖街道)
- Yuwang Subdistrict (禹王街道)
- Nanhu Subdistrict (南湖街道)
- Xihu Subdistrict (西湖街道)

Towns

- Lukou Town (路口镇)
- Ducheng Town (堵城镇)
- Chencelou Town (陈策楼镇)

Township

- Taodian Township (陶店乡)

Other Area

- Railway Station Economic Development Area (火车站经济开发区)
