= Yingshan County, Hubei =

Yingshan County 英山县
- County
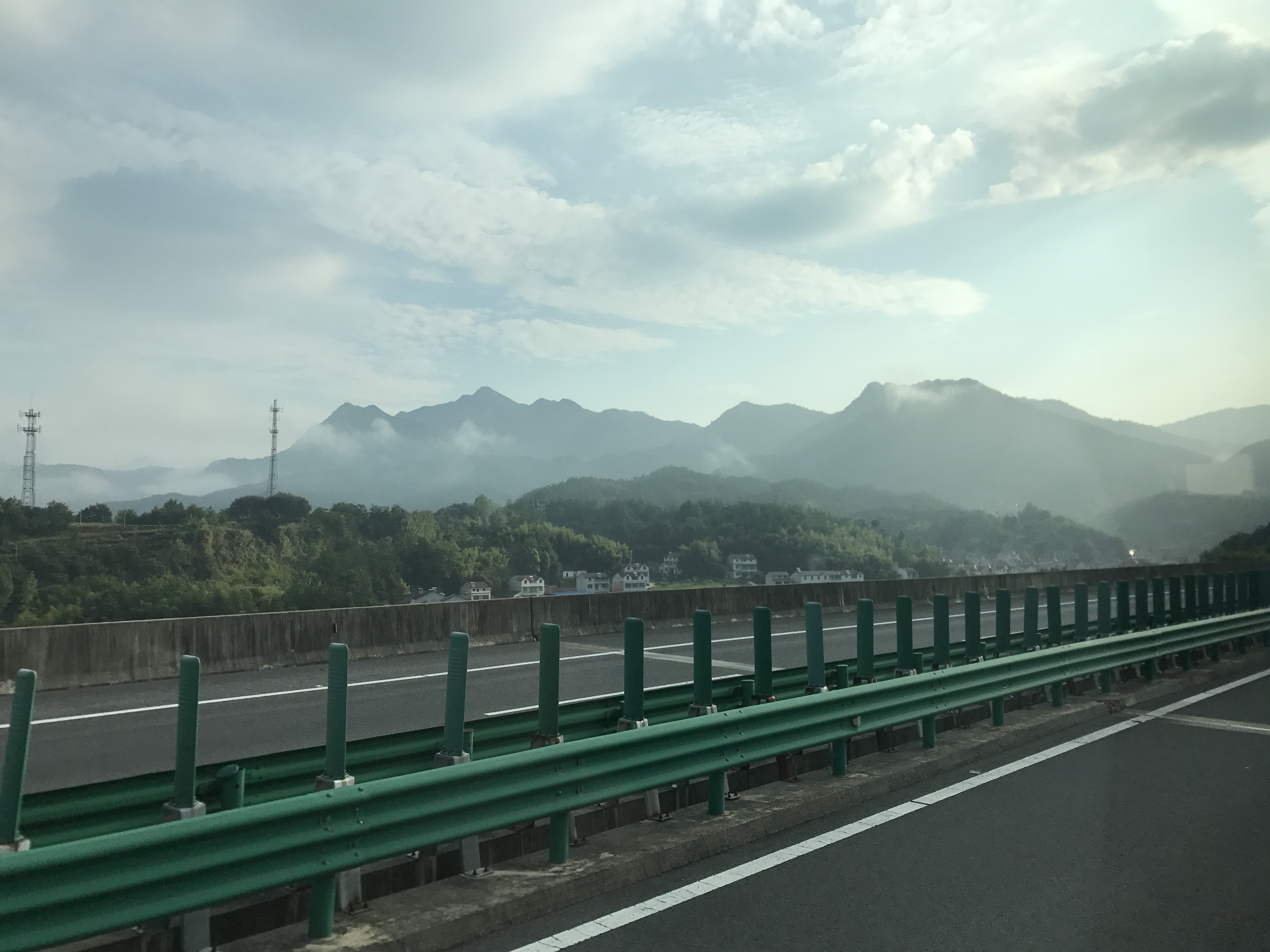
- View near Yangliuwan

- Location of the seat in Hubei
- Coordinates (Yingshan government): 30°44′06″N 115°40′52″E
- Country: People's Republic of China
- Province: Hubei
- Prefecture-level city: Huanggang

Area
  - Total: 1,449 km^{2} (559 sq mi)

Population (2010)
  - Total: 357,296
  - Density: 246.6/km^{2} (638.6/sq mi)
- Time zone: UTC+8 (China Standard)
- Website: 英山政府网 (Yingshan Government Website) (in Simplified Chinese)

Yingshan County (simplified Chinese: 英山县; traditional Chinese: 英山縣; pinyin: Yīngshān Xiàn) is one of the seven counties governed by the prefecture-level city of Huanggang, Hubei, located on the eastern edge of the province, adjoining Anhui, and encompassing the southwestern portion of the Dabie Mountains. The county covers an area of 1,449 square kilometres (559 sq mi) in 11 towns and townships.

== History ==
Yingshan is famous as the birthplace of Bi Sheng, the inventor of movable-type printing technology in the 11th century, which is regarded as one of ancient China's Four Great Inventions. Communist guerrillas were active in the area in the early period of their insurgency, and the 27th Corps of the Red Army was set up there. It was also the point of departure for the 25th Corps on the Communists' Long March to Yan'an.

Yingshan County in the Long March after the Fourth Encirclement Campaign against the Hubei-Henan-Anhui Soviet

== Geography ==
=== Administrative divisions ===
Yingshan County administers eight towns and three townships:

| # | Name | Chinese (S) |
|---|---|---|
Towns
| 1 | Wenquan | 温泉镇 |
| 2 | Nanhe | 南河镇 |
| 3 | Hongshan | 红山镇 |
| 4 | Jinjiapu | 金家铺镇 |
| 5 | Shitouzui | 石头咀镇 (石头嘴镇) |
| 6 | Caopandi | 草盘地镇 |
| 7 | Leijiadian | 雷家店镇 |
| 8 | Yangliuwan | 杨柳湾镇 |
Townships
| 9 | Fangjiazui | 方家咀乡 (方家嘴乡) |
| 10 | Kongjiafang | 孔家坊乡 |
| 11 | Taojiahe | 陶家河乡 |
Townships
| 12 | Taohuachong Forestry Area | 桃花冲林场 |
| 13 | Wujiashan Forestry Area | 吴家山林场 |
| 14 | Wufengshan Forestry Area | 五峰山林场 |
| 15 | Yingshan County Economic Development District | 英山县经济开发区 |

== Climate ==
Climate data for Yingshan, elevation 124 m (407 ft), (1991–2020 normals, extremes 1981–present)
| Month | Jan | Feb | Mar | Apr | May | Jun | Jul | Aug | Sep | Oct | Nov | Dec | Year |
|---|---|---|---|---|---|---|---|---|---|---|---|---|---|
| Record high °C (°F) | 23.8 (74.8) | 28.0 (82.4) | 32.4 (90.3) | 34.1 (93.4) | 36.4 (97.5) | 38.6 (101.5) | 40.0 (104.0) | 40.0 (104.0) | 39.5 (103.1) | 35.8 (96.4) | 30.6 (87.1) | 24.2 (75.6) | 40.0 (104.0) |
| Mean daily maximum °C (°F) | 9.3 (48.7) | 12.2 (54.0) | 16.9 (62.4) | 23.2 (73.8) | 27.8 (82.0) | 30.4 (86.7) | 33.2 (91.8) | 33.2 (91.8) | 29.8 (85.6) | 24.3 (75.7) | 18.2 (64.8) | 12.0 (53.6) | 22.5 (72.6) |
| Daily mean °C (°F) | 4.1 (39.4) | 6.8 (44.2) | 11.1 (52.0) | 17.1 (62.8) | 22.0 (71.6) | 25.3 (77.5) | 28.1 (82.6) | 27.7 (81.9) | 23.8 (74.8) | 18.0 (64.4) | 11.7 (53.1) | 5.9 (42.6) | 16.8 (62.2) |
| Mean daily minimum °C (°F) | 0.5 (32.9) | 2.8 (37.0) | 6.7 (44.1) | 12.4 (54.3) | 17.4 (63.3) | 21.4 (70.5) | 24.4 (75.9) | 23.8 (74.8) | 19.5 (67.1) | 13.5 (56.3) | 7.2 (45.0) | 1.8 (35.2) | 12.6 (54.7) |
| Record low °C (°F) | −10.1 (13.8) | −7.0 (19.4) | −5.2 (22.6) | 1.7 (35.1) | 7.5 (45.5) | 11.4 (52.5) | 17.7 (63.9) | 16.6 (61.9) | 8.9 (48.0) | 1.5 (34.7) | −5.0 (23.0) | −12.0 (10.4) | −12.0 (10.4) |
| Average precipitation mm (inches) | 52.7 (2.07) | 69.9 (2.75) | 95.8 (3.77) | 139.4 (5.49) | 173.6 (6.83) | 238.4 (9.39) | 262.1 (10.32) | 151.4 (5.96) | 87.1 (3.43) | 59.4 (2.34) | 50.3 (1.98) | 33.4 (1.31) | 1,413.5 (55.64) |
| Average precipitation days (≥ 0.1 mm) | 10.1 | 10.5 | 13.0 | 11.5 | 12.7 | 13.6 | 13.7 | 12.1 | 8.5 | 8.3 | 9.2 | 7.2 | 130.4 |
| Average snowy days | 3.4 | 2.0 | 0.8 | 0.1 | 0 | 0 | 0 | 0 | 0 | 0 | 0.2 | 1.2 | 7.7 |
| Average relative humidity (%) | 75 | 75 | 74 | 74 | 75 | 80 | 80 | 79 | 74 | 74 | 76 | 73 | 76 |
| Mean monthly sunshine hours | 104.8 | 102.7 | 126.2 | 154.4 | 169.4 | 154.7 | 198.1 | 204.1 | 175.0 | 163.8 | 140.8 | 130.2 | 1,824.2 |
| Percentage possible sunshine | 33 | 33 | 34 | 40 | 40 | 37 | 46 | 50 | 48 | 47 | 45 | 42 | 41 |
Source: China Meteorological Administration

== Economy ==
The county is rich in natural resources and produces tea, silk, herbs, chestnuts, and granite. Yingshan is the leading producer of Green Tea in Hubei and the fourth largest tea producer in China. There are four hot water springs in Yingshan town, with the water temperature recorded up to 71 Celsius degrees.

== Transportation ==
- China National Highway 318

== Gallery ==
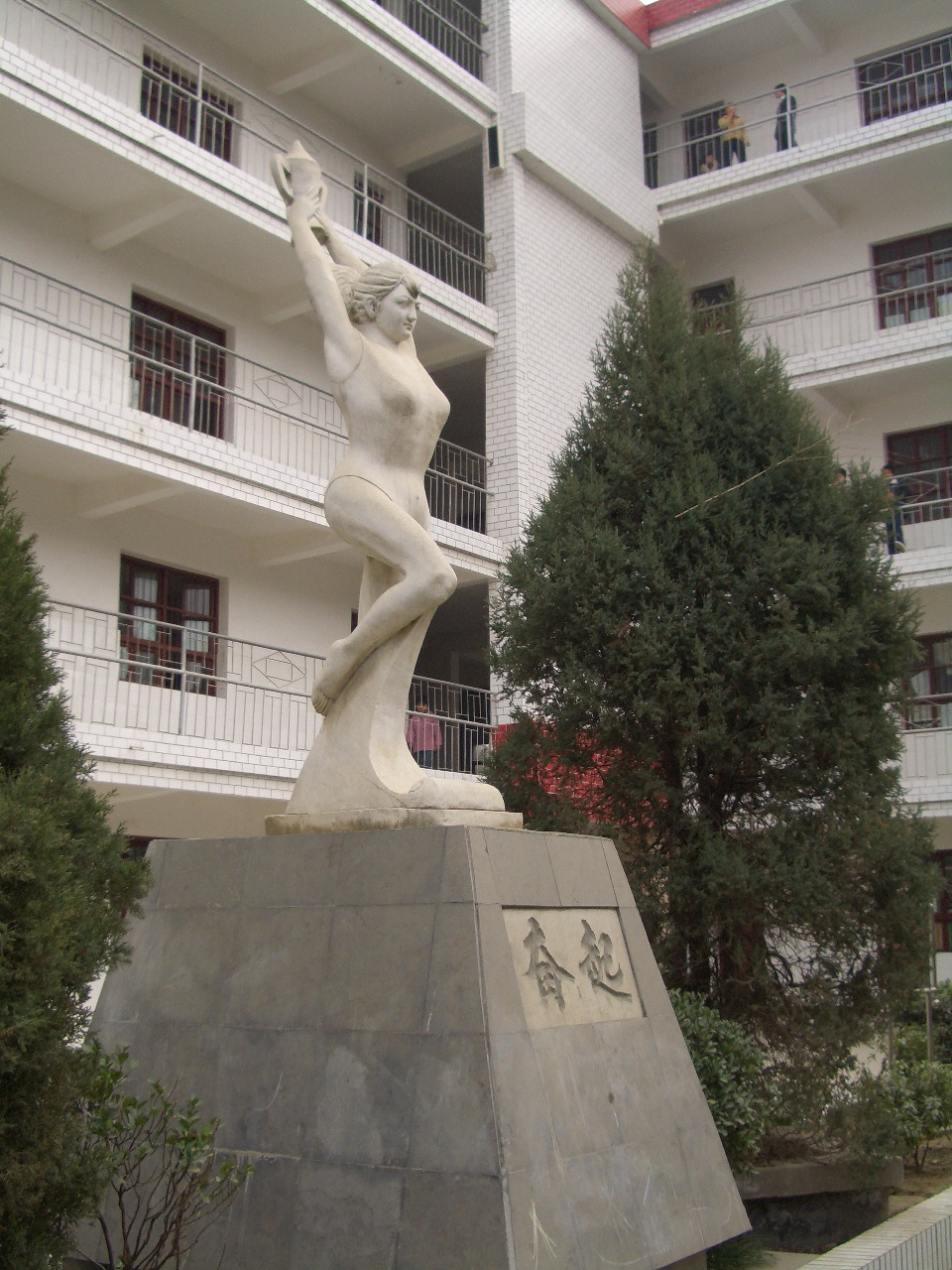
'Rise' Yingshan Vocational School

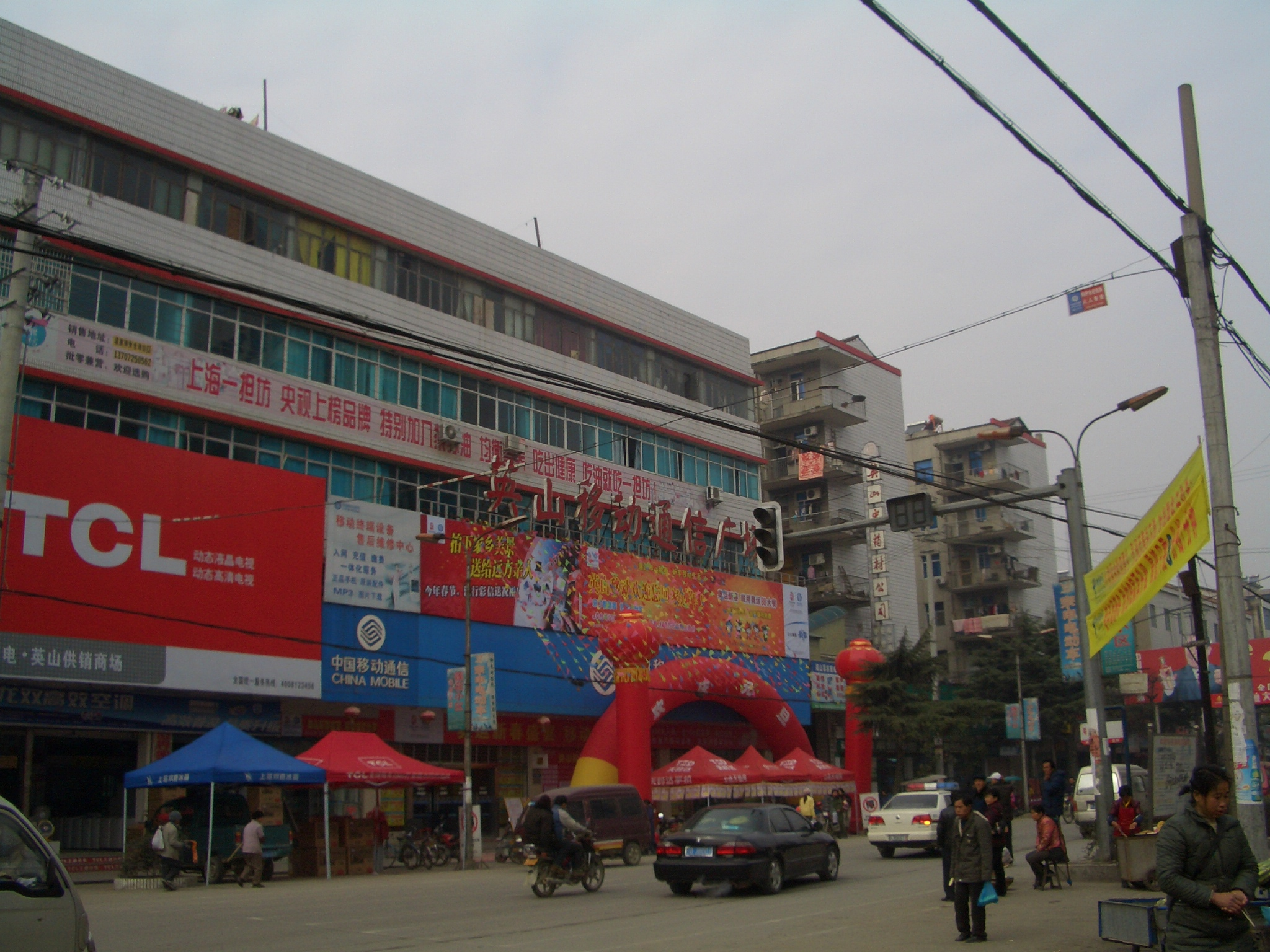
Yingshan China Mobile Telecommunication Square

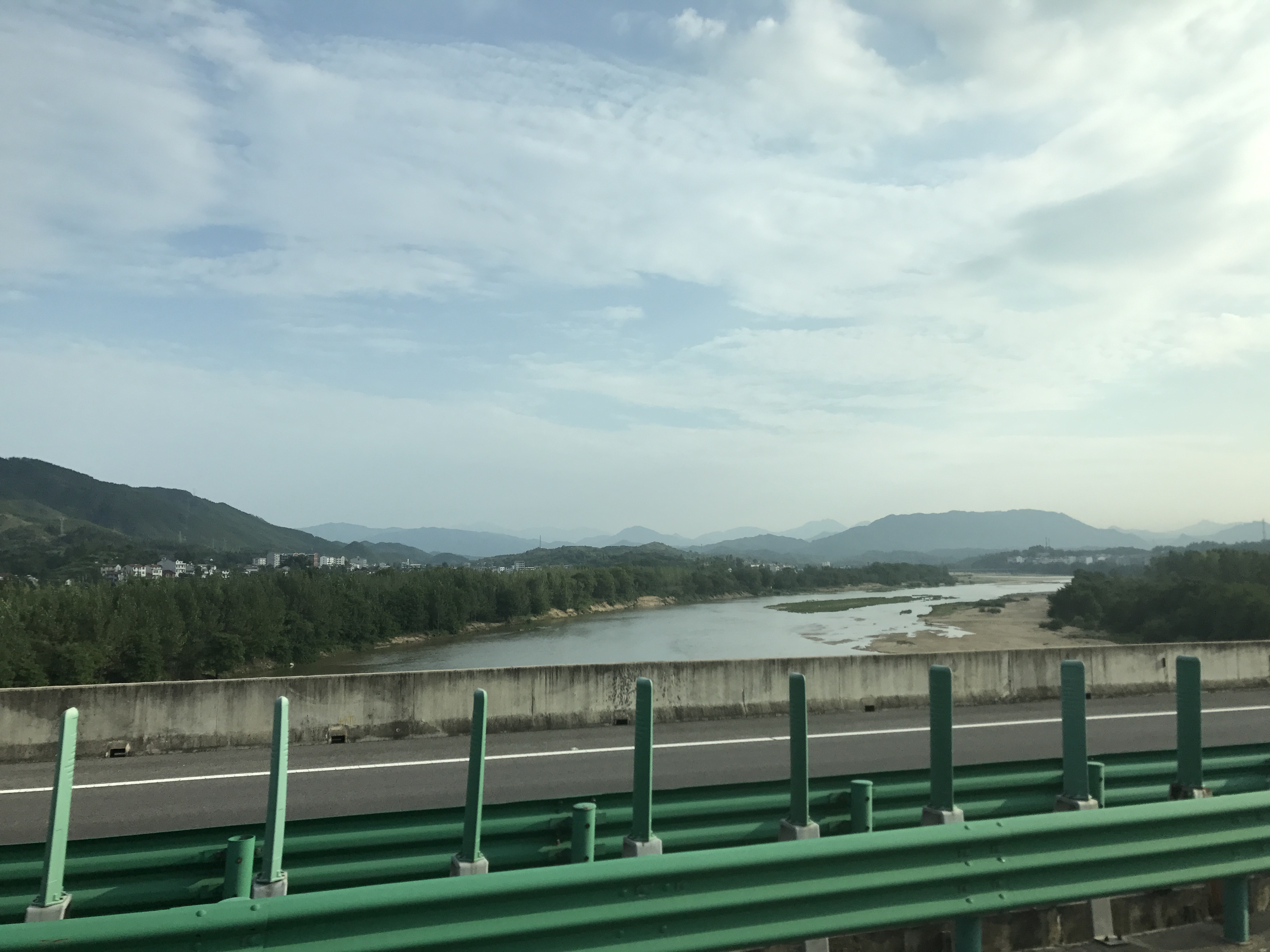
Donghe River near Yangliuwan, Yingshan

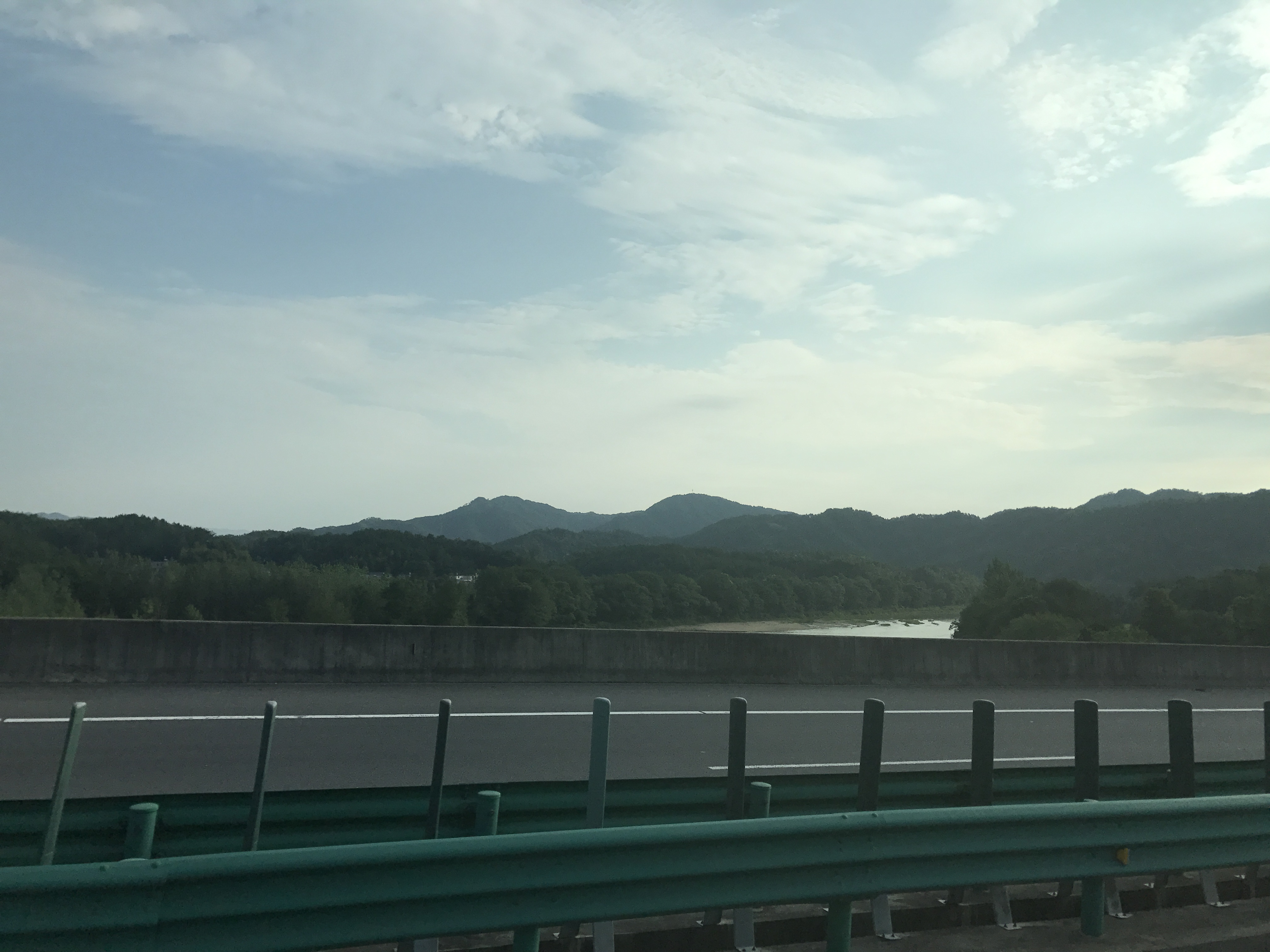
Xihe River near Hongshan, Yingshan

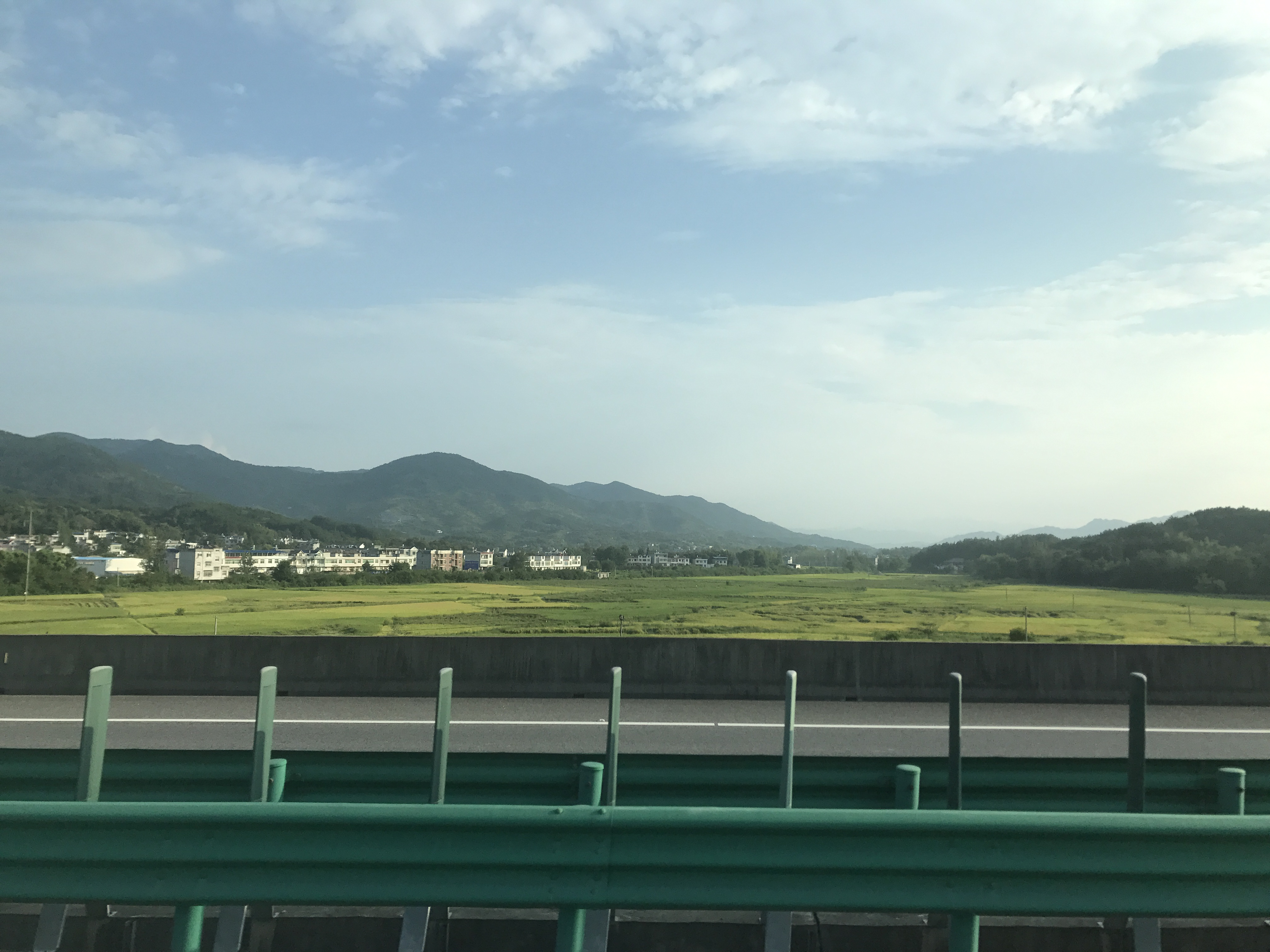
View near Hongshan, Yingshan

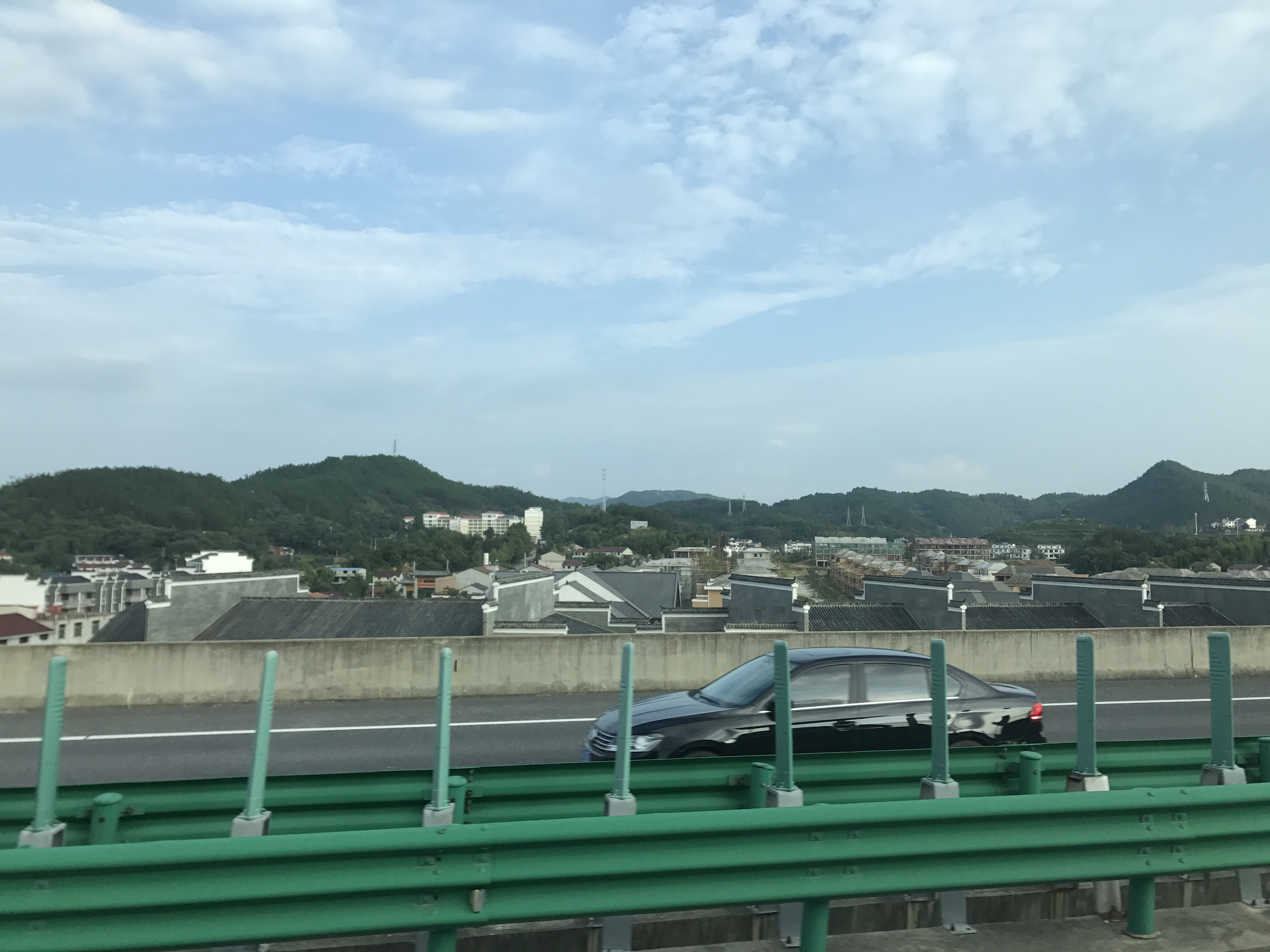
View near Hongshan, Yingshan

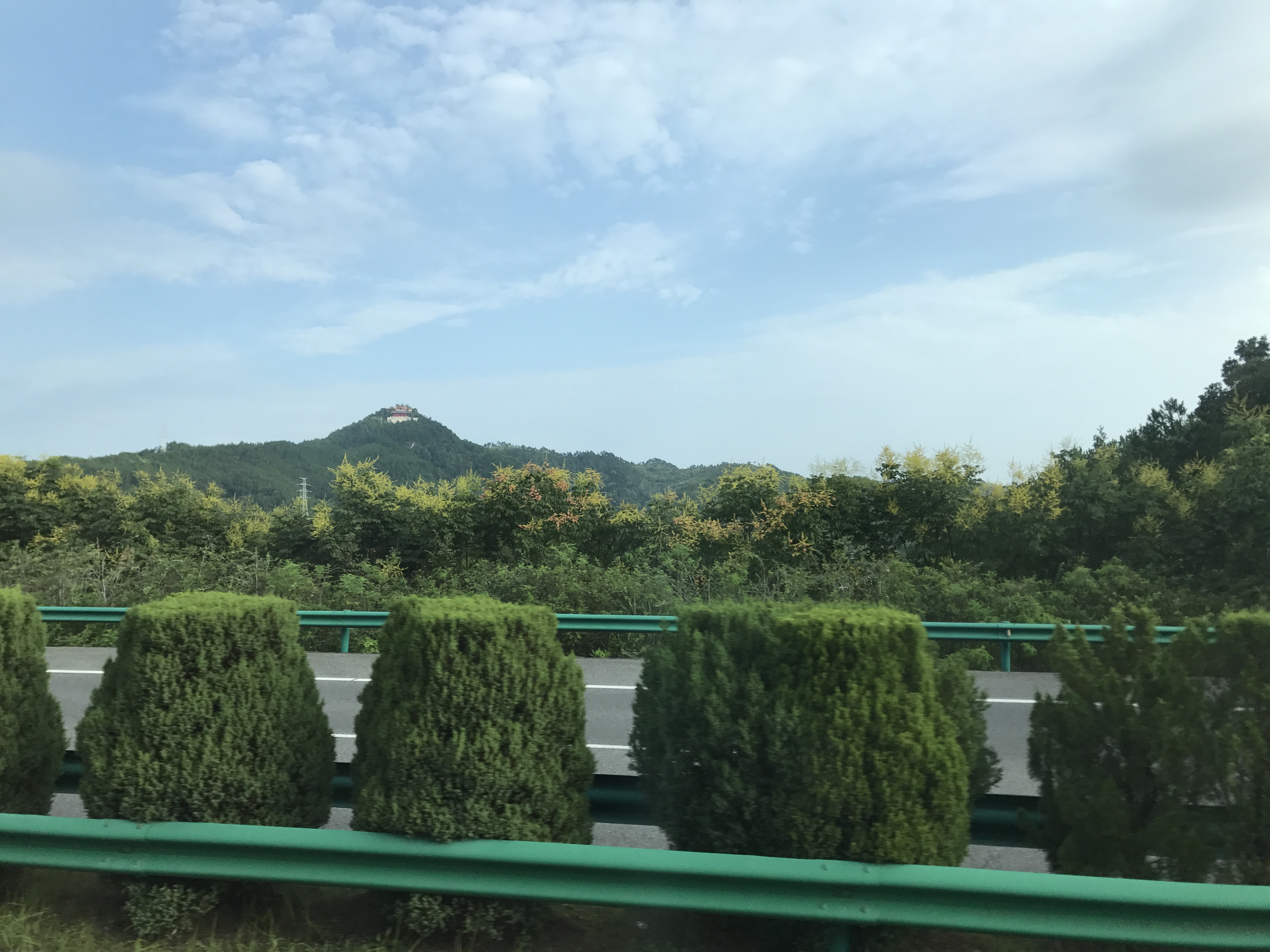
View near Hongshan, Yingshan
