= Wenquan, Huanggang =

Wenquan 温泉镇
- Town
- Location in Hubei
- Coordinates: 30°43′58″N 115°40′51″E
- Country: People's Republic of China
- Province: Hubei
- Prefecture-level city: Huanggang
- County: Yingshan

Area
  - Total: 161.6 km^{2} (62.4 sq mi)
- Elevation: 102 m (335 ft)

Population (2010)
  - Total: 121,669
  - Density: 752.9/km^{2} (1,950/sq mi)
- Time zone: UTC+8 (China Standard)

Wenquan (simplified Chinese: 温泉镇; traditional Chinese: 溫泉鎮; pinyin: Wēnquán Zhèn; lit. 'hot spring town') is a town in and the seat of Yingshan County in extreme eastern Hubei province, China.

== Geography ==
=== Administrative divisions ===
As of 2011, it has 5 residential communities (社区) and 49 villages under its administration. As of 2013 and later as of 2016, Wenquan administered:

#	Name	Chinese (S)
Communities
1	Bisheng	毕升社区
2	Dongmen East Gate	东门社区
3	Jiming Rooster Crow	鸡鸣社区
4	Lingyuan Cemetery	陵园社区
5	Chengbei City North	城北社区
Villages
6	Lianhua Lotus	莲花村
7	Baishi'ao White Stone Hollow	白石坳村
8	Po'ernao	坡儿垴村
9	Xitanghe	西汤河村
10	Beitanghe	北汤河村
11	Huayuan	花园村
12	Gantang'ao	甘塘坳村
13	Maqian	马堑村
14	Danaozhai	大垴寨村
15	Jiangjunshan	将军山村
16	Shanxi'ao	山溪坳村
17	Jinjiaqiao	金家桥村
18	Xiaomifan	小米畈村
19	Meijiayan	梅家岩村
20	Doumifan	斗米畈村
21	Liulinhe	柳林河村
22	Shelongjian	蛇龙尖村
23	Majia'ao	马家坳村
24	Yangshugou	杨树沟村
25	Huangboshan	黄柏山村
26	Baijianhe	百笕河村
27	Fengshupai	枫树排村
28	Chenhe	陈河村
29	Shangma'ao	上马坳村
30	Ma'anzhai	马鞍寨村
31	Maocao'ao	茅草坳村
32	Baizhanghe	百丈河村
33	Xieshuiyan	泻水岩村
34	Yitianmen	一天门村
35	Heishitou	黑石头村
36	Longtanfan	龙潭畈村
37	Qiliyan	七里岩村
38	Shawanhe	沙塆河村
39	Taofang	陶坊村
40	Chishuichong	赤水冲村
41	Zhaojiafan	赵家畈村
42	Shimenchong	石门冲村
43	Pengfan	彭畈村
44	Baishuci	柏树祠村
45	Huangzhushan	黄竹山村
46	Xiabeichong	下贝冲村
47	Xichong	西冲村
48	Tafan	塔畈村
49	Qiangjiawan	羌家塆村
50	Chongshanpu	崇山铺村
51	Jilinggou	季陵沟村
52	Shucai	蔬菜村
	Jiulongkou	九垄口村
	Nanchongfan	南冲畈村
