= Wen Yiduo =

Chinese poet and scholar

- 聞一多
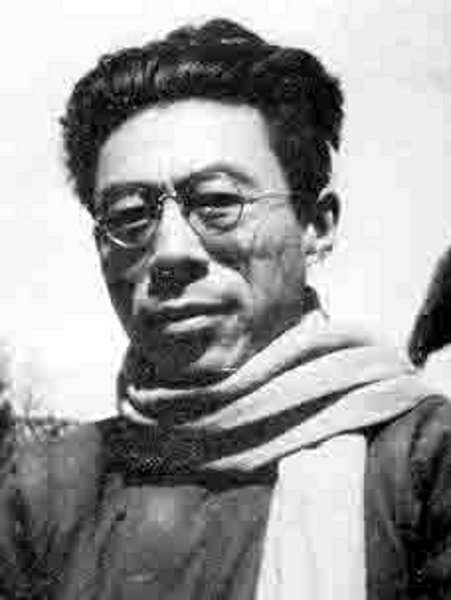
- Born: 24 November 1899 present-day Xishui County, Huanggang, Hubei, Qing Empire
- Died: 15 September 1946 (aged 46); Kunming, Republic of China
- Education: Tsinghua University; Art Institute of Chicago

Chinese name
- Traditional Chinese: 聞一多
- Simplified Chinese: 闻一多
Transcriptions
Standard Mandarin
- Hanyu Pinyin: Wén Yīduō
- Wade–Giles: Wen^{2} I^{1}-to^{1}
- IPA: [wə̌n í.twó]
Yue: Cantonese
- Yale Romanization: Màhn Yāt-dō
- Jyutping: man^{4} jat^{1} do^{1}
- IPA: [mɐn˩ jɐt̚˥.tɔ˥]

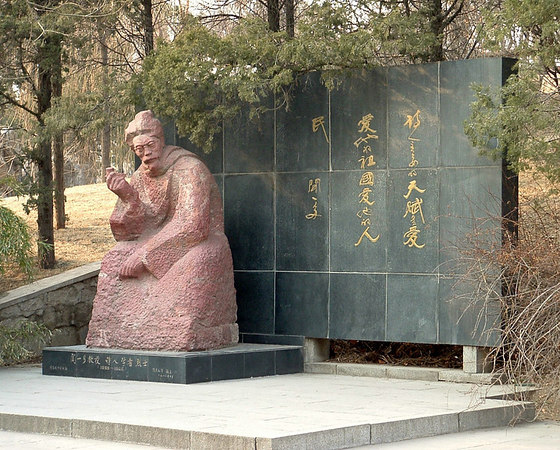
Statue of Wen Yiduo at Tsinghua University in Beijing

Wen Yiduo (Chinese: 聞一多; pinyin: Wén Yīduō; 24 November 1899 – 15 July 1946) was a Chinese poet and scholar known for his nationalistic poetry. Wen was assassinated by the Kuomintang in 1946.

== Life ==
Wen Yiduo was born Wén Jiāhuá (聞家驊) on 24 November 1899 in what is now Xishui County in Hubei Province. After receiving a traditional Chinese Confucian education he went on to continue studying at Tsinghua University.

In 1922, he traveled to the United States to study fine arts and literature at the Art Institute of Chicago. It was during this time that his first collection of poetry, Hongzhu (紅燭, "Red Candle"), was published. In 1925, he traveled back to China and took a university teaching post. In 1928, his second collection, Sishui (死水, "Dead Water"), was published. In the same year he joined the Crescent Moon Society and wrote essays on poetry. He also began to publish the results of his classical Chinese literature research. Wen experienced discrimination in the United States. In his writing about these experience, Wen stated, "I have a nation, I have a history and a culture of five thousand years: How can this be inferior to the Americans?"

At the outbreak of the Second Sino-Japanese War, he and many other intellectuals from northeastern China migrated to Kunming, Yunnan. There he was able to continue to teach, this time in the wartime National Southwestern Associated University. Wen stopped writing poetry in 1931 and became increasingly involved in social criticism. He became politically active in 1944 in support of the China Democratic League. His outspoken nature led to his assassination by secret agents of the Kuomintang after eulogizing his friend Li Gongpu's life at Li's funeral in 1946. Poet Kuo Mo-ji wrote a eulogy for Wen in 1947, shortly after he was assassinated, using the tragic event as an example "of the frustration and vulnerability that was characteristic of the artist's life in China" at the time and compared the poet to the great Qu Yuan.

There is a monument to Wen at the Yunnan Normal University campus in Kunming, as well as a large statue. A small memorial to him, including a wall portrait painted from a famous picture of him smoking his pipe is found in a walkway by his former home (the site is now part of an elementary school) in the Green Lake area of Kunming. He and his wife, Gao Zhen, are buried at the Babaoshan Revolutionary Cemetery in Beijing.

== Poetry ==
Wen's poetry is noted for its experimentation with classical Chinese rules and forms. He modeled his poetry on that of the English poets John Keats, Alfred Tennyson, and Robert Browning, and tried to "recapture the symbolism and ethos of premodern Chinese society". The poems in his second collection, Dead Water (Sǐshuǐ 死水), have "a haunting musicality", and deal with the "heartrendingly heavy" subject of exposing social injustice and corruption.

== Scholarship ==
Wen was credited by David Hawkes as the initiator of the cult of Qu Yuan as "China's first patriotic poet", writing that, "although Qu Yuan did not write about the life of the people or voice their sufferings, he may truthfully be said to have acted as the leader of a people's revolution and to have struck a blow to avenge them. Qu Yuan is the only person in the whole of Chinese history who is fully entitled to be called 'the people's poet'." Wen himself would write, "I am a worshipper of Ch'ü Yüan," in 1944, around the same time when he began to "crystallize, as no one had before, the themes of Ch'ü Yüan."

== Family ==
Wen's eldest grandson, Wen Liming, was a researcher of modern history at the Chinese Academy of Social Sciences. He studied modern Chinese history, including his grandfather's travels to Chicago, and collected and donated a number of materials about Wen Yiduo to National Southwestern Associated University (presently Yunnan Normal University).

== Portrait ==
- Wen Yiduo. A Portrait by Kong Kai Ming at Portrait Gallery of Chinese Writers (Hong Kong Baptist University Library).
