= Huanggang =

Huanggang 黄冈市 Hwangkang
- Prefecture-level city
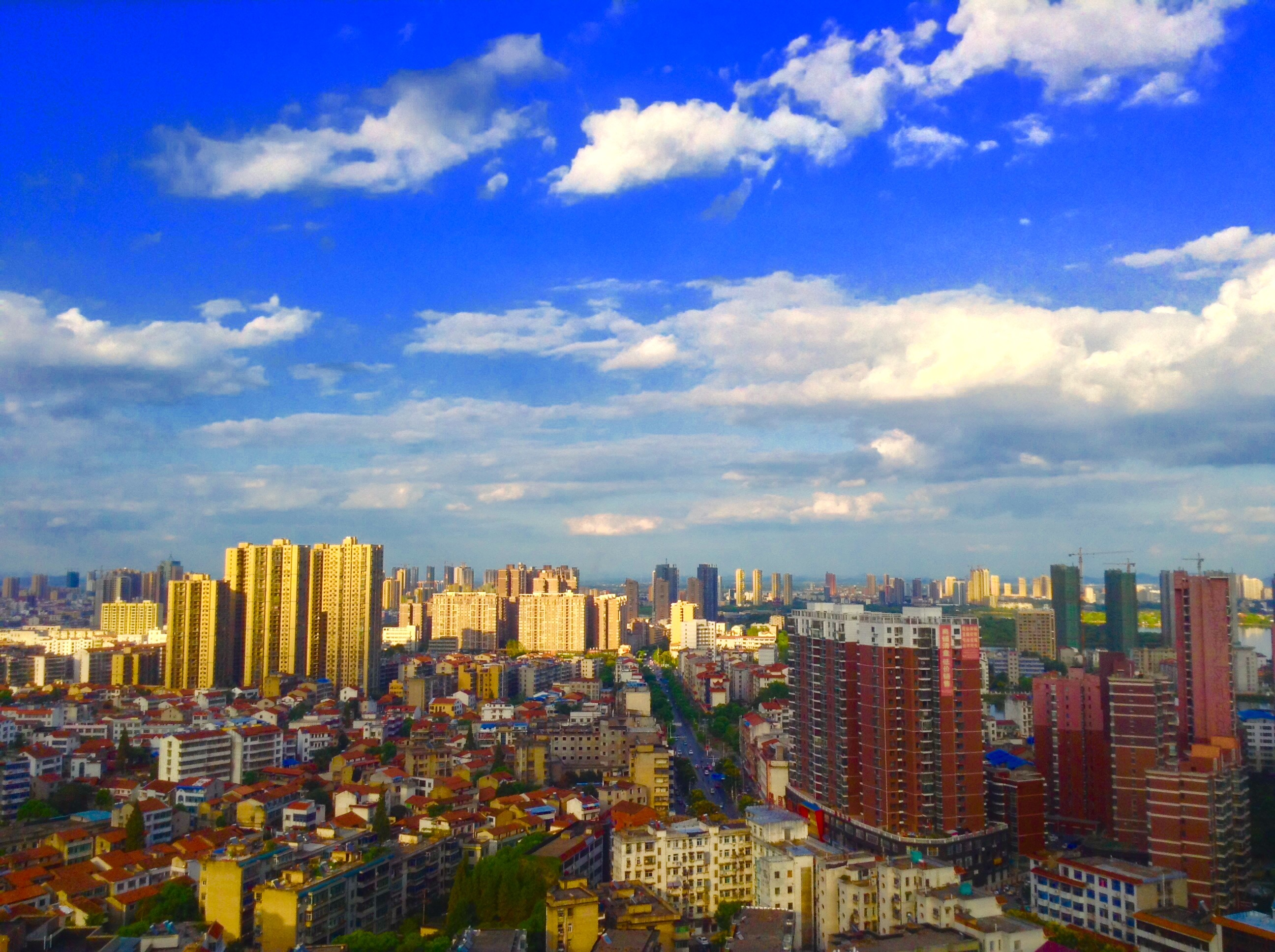
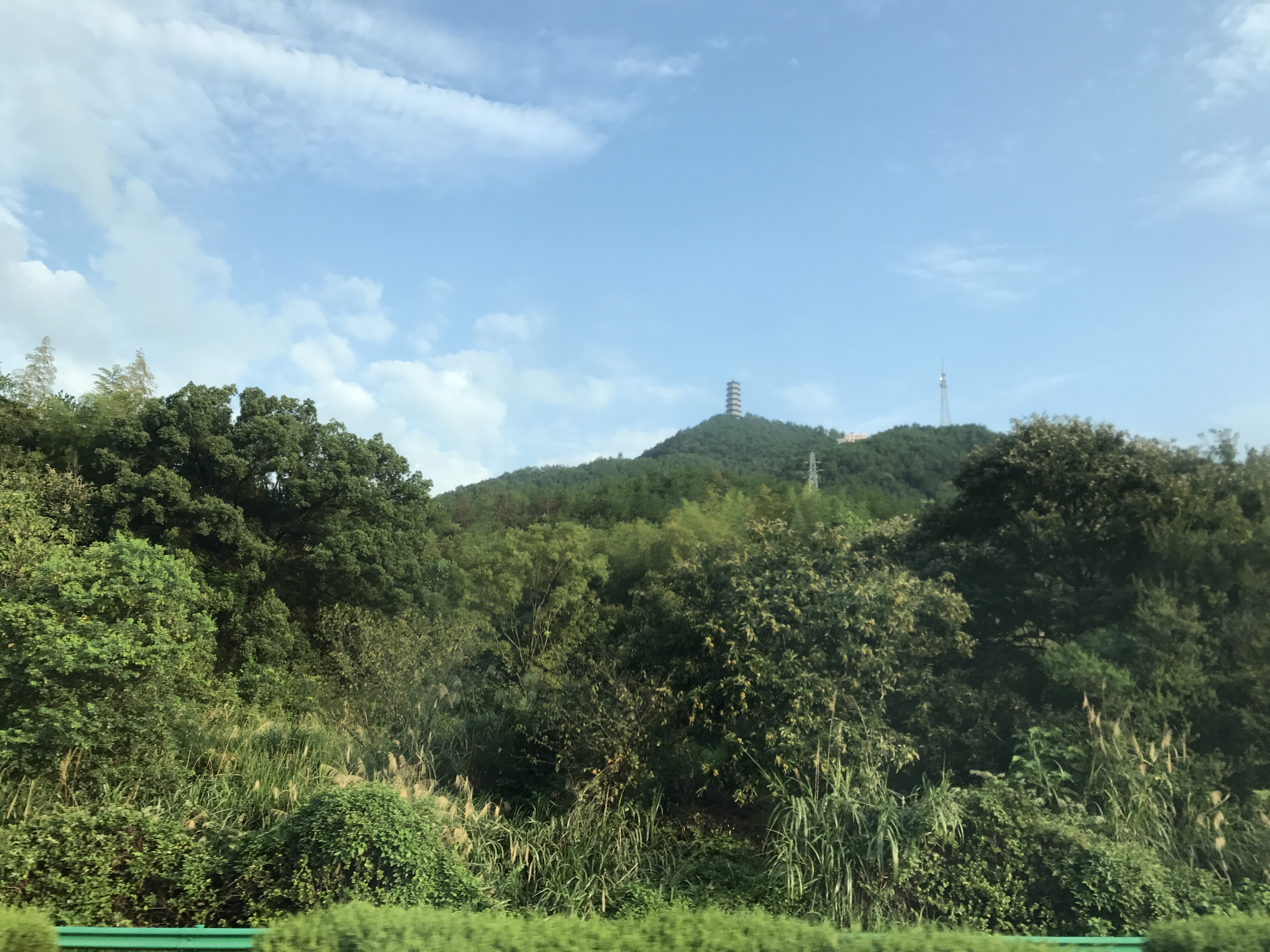
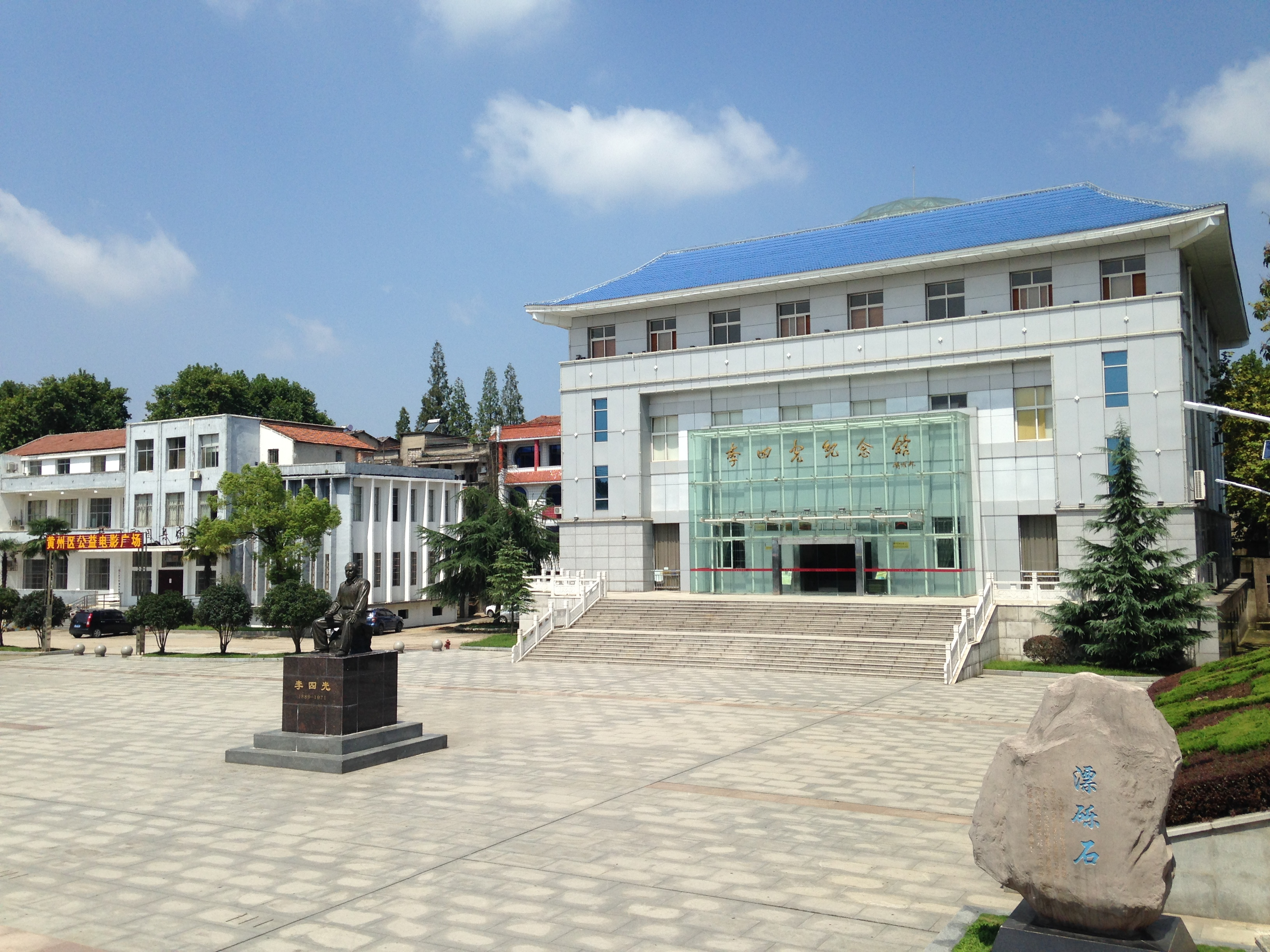
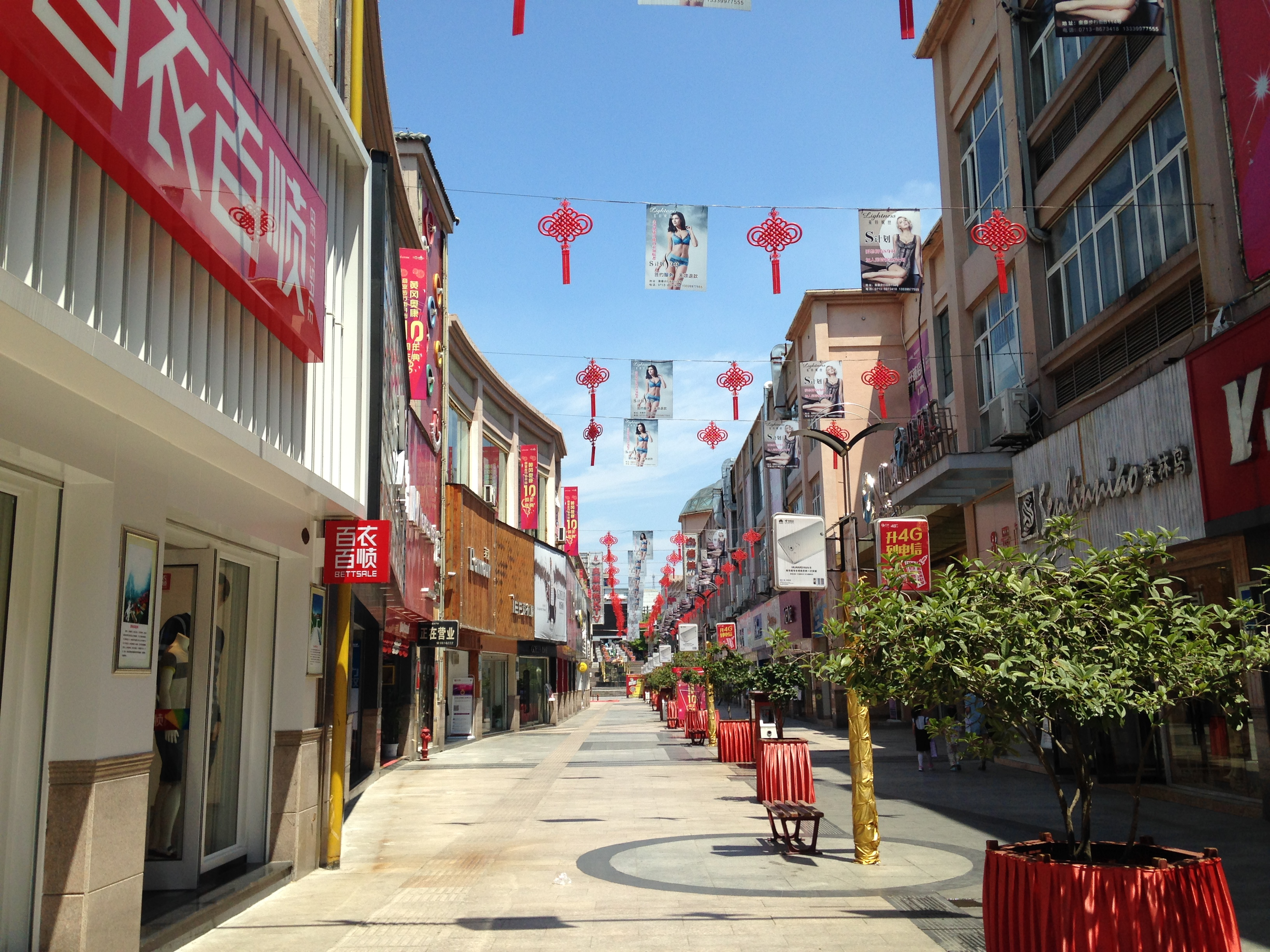
- Clockwise: Huanggang skyline, Li Siguang Memorial Museum, Shopping street in Huangzhou, Mount Tashan near Fengshan.

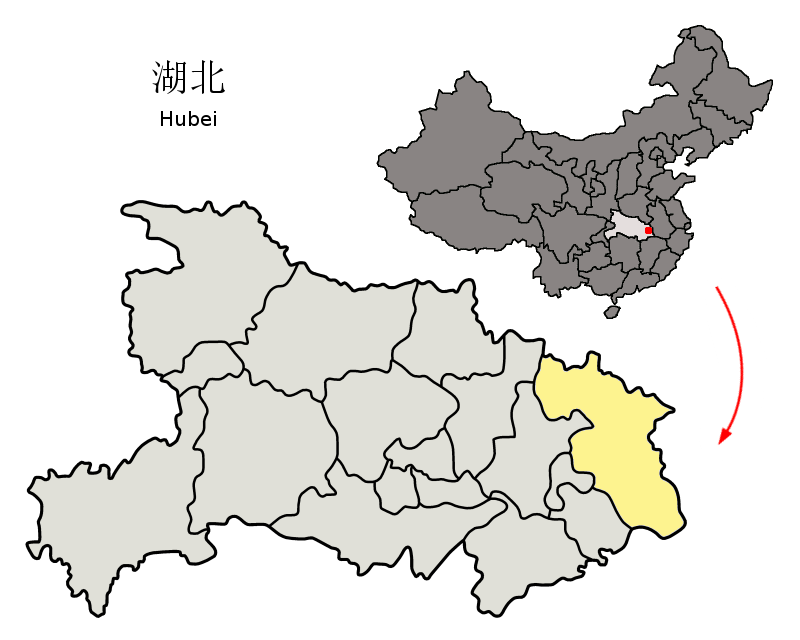
- Location of Huanggang City jurisdiction in Hubei

- Location of downtown Huanggang in Hubei Huanggang (China)
- Coordinates (Huanggang municipal government): 30°27′13″N 114°52′21″E
- Country: People's Republic of China
- Province: Hubei
- Municipal seat: Huangzhou District

Area
  - Prefecture-level city: 17,446.63 km^{2} (6,736.18 sq mi)
  - Urban: 363.23 km^{2} (140.24 sq mi)
  - Metro: 963.44 km^{2} (371.99 sq mi)

Population (2020 census)
  - Prefecture-level city: 5,882,719
  - Density: 337.1837/km^{2} (873.3017/sq mi)
  - Urban: 456,862
  - Urban density: 1,257.8/km^{2} (3,257.6/sq mi)
  - Metro: 1,152,559
  - Metro density: 1,196.3/km^{2} (3,098.4/sq mi)

GDP
  - Prefecture-level city: CN¥ 158.9 billion US$ 25.5 billion
  - Per capita: CN¥ 25,319; US$ 4,065
- Time zone: UTC+8 (China Standard)
- ISO 3166 code: CN-HB-11
- Local Dialect: Lower Yangtze Mandarin
- Website: 黄冈市政府门户网站 (Huanggang City Government Web Portal) (in Chinese)

Huanggang
- Simplified Chinese: 黄冈
- Traditional Chinese: 黃岡
Transcriptions
Standard Mandarin
- Hanyu Pinyin: Huánggāng
- Wade–Giles: Huang^{2}-kang^{1}
- IPA: [xwǎŋkáŋ]

Huanggang is a prefecture-level city in easternmost Hubei Province, China. It is situated to the north of the middle reaches of the Yangtze River and is bounded in the north by the Dabie Mountains and is named after Mount Huanggang. It borders Henan in the north, Anhui in the east and Jiangxi in the south.

The city's administrative area covers 17,453 square kilometers (6,739 sq mi) and the total population was 5,882,719 as of the 2020 census whom 456,862 resided in the Huangzhou urban district, making it the second most populous city in the province by administrative population, after Wuhan, the provincial capital. the Ezhou – Huanggang built-up (or metro) area was home to 1,152,559 inhabitants comprising (Echeng district and Huangzhou district of Huanggang), and many of its residents work in Wuhan. In 2007, the city is named China's top ten livable cities by Chinese Cities Brand Value Report, which was released at the 2007 Beijing Summit of China Cities Forum.

== History ==
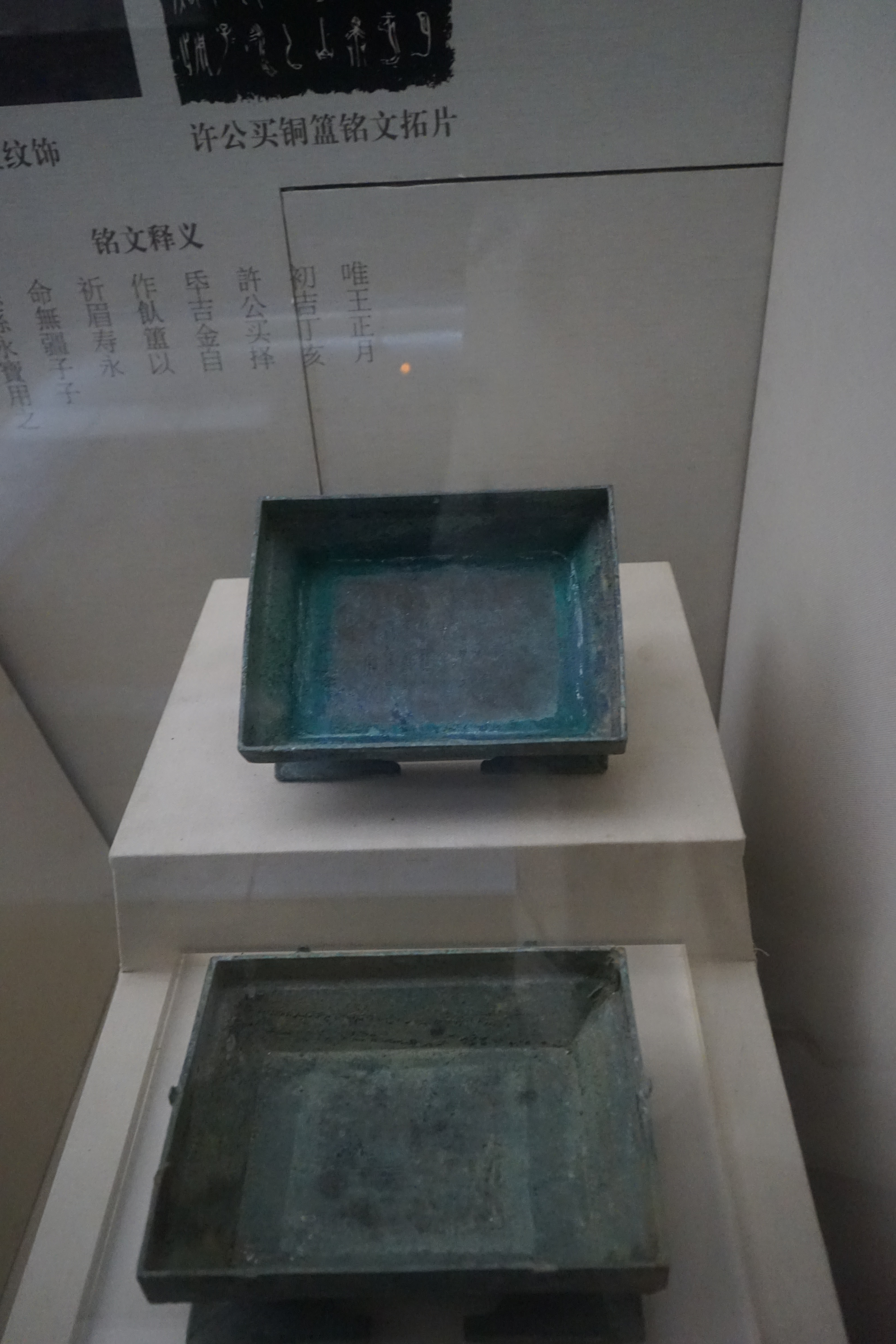
Xugongmai Bronze Fu. Spring and Autumn period. Excavated at Weijia Pavilion Village, Yuwangcheng, Huangzhou.

In 845 BC Marquis Wen (文侯) Huang Meng (黃孟; also known as Huang Zhang / 黃璋) moved the capital of the State of Huang from Yicheng to Huangchuan (present-day Huangchuan, Henan). Huang Xi's descendants ruled State of Huang until 648 BC when it was destroyed by the State of Chu. The Marquis of Huang, Marquis Mu (穆侯) Huang Qisheng (黃企生), fled to the state of Qi. The people of Huang were forced to relocate to Chu. They settled in the region of present-day Hubei province, in a region known as the Jiangxia Prefecture (江夏郡) during the Han dynasty (206 BC – AD 220). There are many places in this region today that were named after Huang e.g. Huanggang, Huangpi, Huangmei, Huangshi, Huangan, Huangzhou etc. Many of the people of Huang were also relocated to regions south of the Yangtze River. During the reign of Emperor Cheng of Jin, Later Zhao forces inflicted great damage on many Jin cities and bases north of the Yangtze and captured Zhucheng (邾城, in modern Huanggang, Hubei). Huanggang has a history of at least 2,000 years.

On July 6, 2026, a large and violent tornado swept through the city, killing at least 11 people and causing major damage.

== Administration ==
Huanggang administers 12 county-level divisions, including one district, two county-level cities and seven counties:

Map
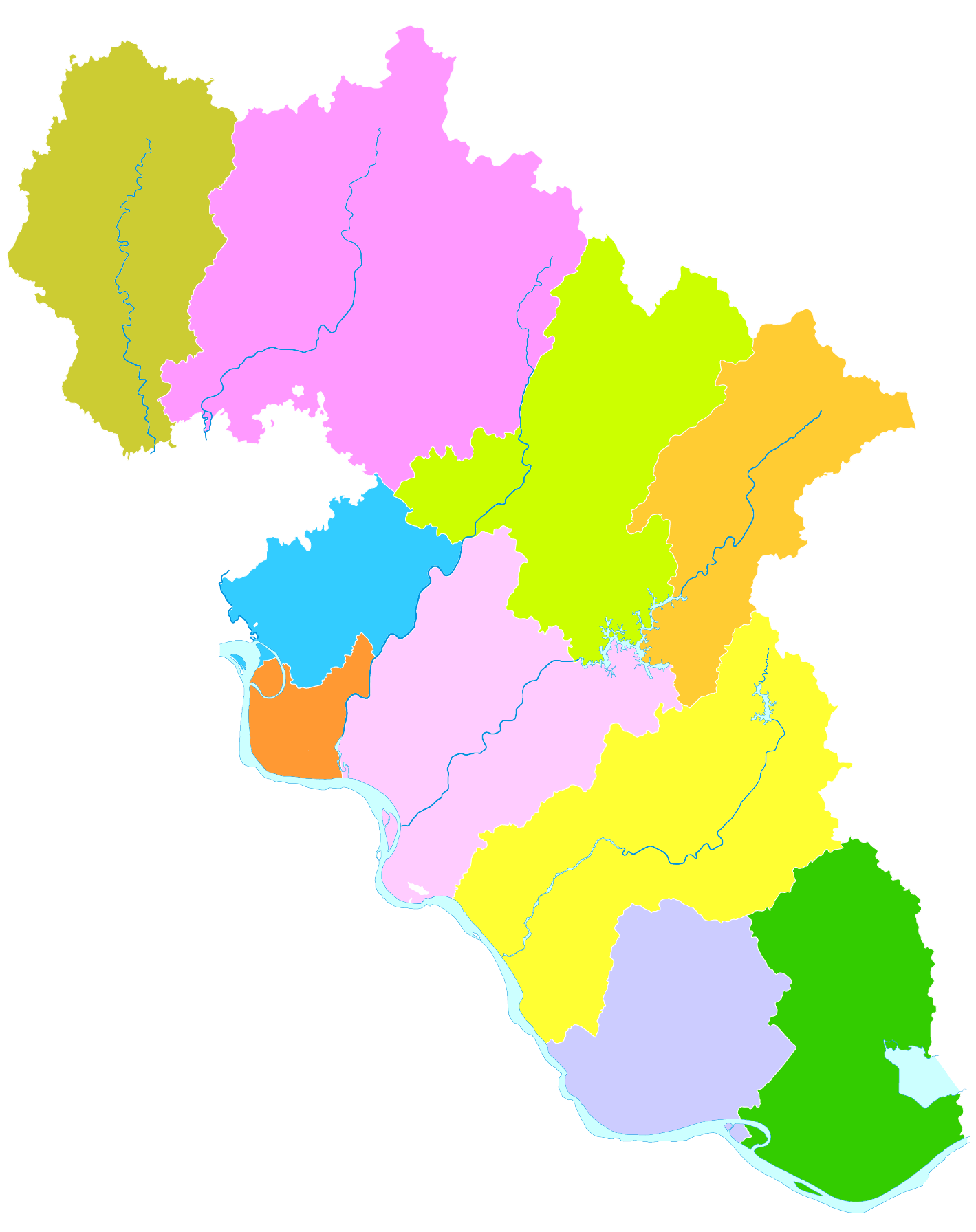

#	Name	Chinese (S)	Population
Counties
1	Hong'an County	红安县	510,189
2	Luotian County	罗田县	473,195
3	Yingshan County	英山县	357,296
4	Xishui County Xi River	浠水县	716,273
5	Qichun County	蕲春县	792,101
6	Huangmei County Yellow Plum	黄梅县	787,783
7	Tuanfeng County	团风县	266,218
County-level cities
8	Wuxue City	武穴市	676,264
9	Macheng City	麻城市	893,654
District
10	Huangzhou District	黄州区	456,862
Other Areas
11	Longganhu Administrative District	龙感湖管理区	
12	Huanggang Economonic Development Area	黄冈经济开发区	

== Climate ==
Climate data for Huanggang, elevation 26 m (85 ft), (1991–2020 normals, extremes 1981–present)
Month	Jan	Feb	Mar	Apr	May	Jun	Jul	Aug	Sep	Oct	Nov	Dec	Year
Record high °C (°F)	20.7 (69.3)	28.7 (83.7)	35.0 (95.0)	33.9 (93.0)	36.1 (97.0)	37.8 (100.0)	39.7 (103.5)	40.0 (104.0)	39.3 (102.7)	34.9 (94.8)	29.7 (85.5)	22.2 (72.0)	40.0 (104.0)
Mean daily maximum °C (°F)	8.3 (46.9)	11.3 (52.3)	16.0 (60.8)	22.4 (72.3)	27.2 (81.0)	30.1 (86.2)	33.1 (91.6)	32.9 (91.2)	29.0 (84.2)	23.5 (74.3)	17.2 (63.0)	11.0 (51.8)	21.8 (71.3)
Daily mean °C (°F)	4.7 (40.5)	7.4 (45.3)	11.7 (53.1)	17.8 (64.0)	22.7 (72.9)	26.1 (79.0)	29.2 (84.6)	28.6 (83.5)	24.6 (76.3)	18.9 (66.0)	12.7 (54.9)	7.0 (44.6)	17.6 (63.7)
Mean daily minimum °C (°F)	1.9 (35.4)	4.4 (39.9)	8.4 (47.1)	14.1 (57.4)	19.1 (66.4)	23.0 (73.4)	26.0 (78.8)	25.4 (77.7)	21.3 (70.3)	15.5 (59.9)	9.4 (48.9)	4.0 (39.2)	14.4 (57.9)
Record low °C (°F)	−6.0 (21.2)	−7.4 (18.7)	−1.9 (28.6)	3.1 (37.6)	10.0 (50.0)	13.3 (55.9)	19.0 (66.2)	17.0 (62.6)	11.7 (53.1)	4.4 (39.9)	−2.8 (27.0)	−8.0 (17.6)	−8.0 (17.6)
Average precipitation mm (inches)	55.3 (2.18)	74.8 (2.94)	104.8 (4.13)	149.8 (5.90)	174.5 (6.87)	217.6 (8.57)	228.6 (9.00)	119.9 (4.72)	70.7 (2.78)	67.9 (2.67)	56.6 (2.23)	32.4 (1.28)	1,352.9 (53.27)
Average precipitation days (≥ 0.1 mm)	10.3	11.2	13.5	12.2	12.1	13.0	12.0	10.2	7.6	8.4	9.0	7.2	126.7
Average snowy days	3.6	1.9	0.7	0	0	0	0	0	0	0	0.3	1.2	7.7
Average relative humidity (%)	78	78	77	77	77	80	79	78	76	75	76	75	77
Mean monthly sunshine hours	106.5	108.5	132.0	161.7	175.7	165.5	218.0	233.6	189.8	168.0	145.5	131.2	1,936
Percentage possible sunshine	33	34	35	42	41	39	51	58	52	48	46	42	43
Source: China Meteorological Administration

== Cultural heritage ==
Huanggang is home to several significant cultural sites of historical interest, such as the Buddhist Ancestral Hall of Sakyamuni at Doufang Mountain, Wuzu Temple and its Changchun Nunnery, and Dongpo Red Cliff.

== Education ==
Huanggang Normal University is a full-time institution of higher education located in the city of Huanggang.

== Economy ==
Huanggang has a diversified economy, ranging from bio- and herbal medicine to manufacturing, agriculture, and tourism. Since ancient times, Huanggang has been renowned for local specialties such as the "Qichun Four Treasures" (snake, turtle, bamboo, and moxa), Huangmei "tiaohua" embroidery, and Wuxue "zhangshuiqian" bamboo products. Today, Huanggang at large is recognized for organic vegetables. With its "Guihuaxiang" brand of chestnuts, Luotian is the leading chestnut-growing county in all of China. Yingshan is famous for its "cloud mist" green tea. Qichun, of course, is famous for herbal medicine. Macheng is a national model county for cattle breeding. Huangmei is a major center of freshwater shrimp and fragrant jade rice production. And Hong'an peanut production ranks the first in Hubei Province.

== Transportation ==
Huanggang enjoys an excellent transportation infrastructure. Wuhan airport is 90 kilometers (56 mi) to the west, while Jiujiang Airport in Jiangxi to the east is 160 kilometers (99 mi) away. Being on the Yangtze River, Wuhan main port is located 80 kilometers (50 mi) away, and Huangzhou District has a small bulk-handling port. There is an extensive road network, with three north–south and seven east–west major roads within the main city area. The city also is served by several new expressways, including the north–south "Jingzhu" (Beijing to Zhuhai, Guangdong) expressway and the east–west Wuhan to Shanghai expressway. Huanggang also is on the main north–south "Jingjiu" (Beijing to Hong Kong) and "Jingguang" (Beijing to Guangzhou, Guangdong) railway lines.

=== Bridges ===
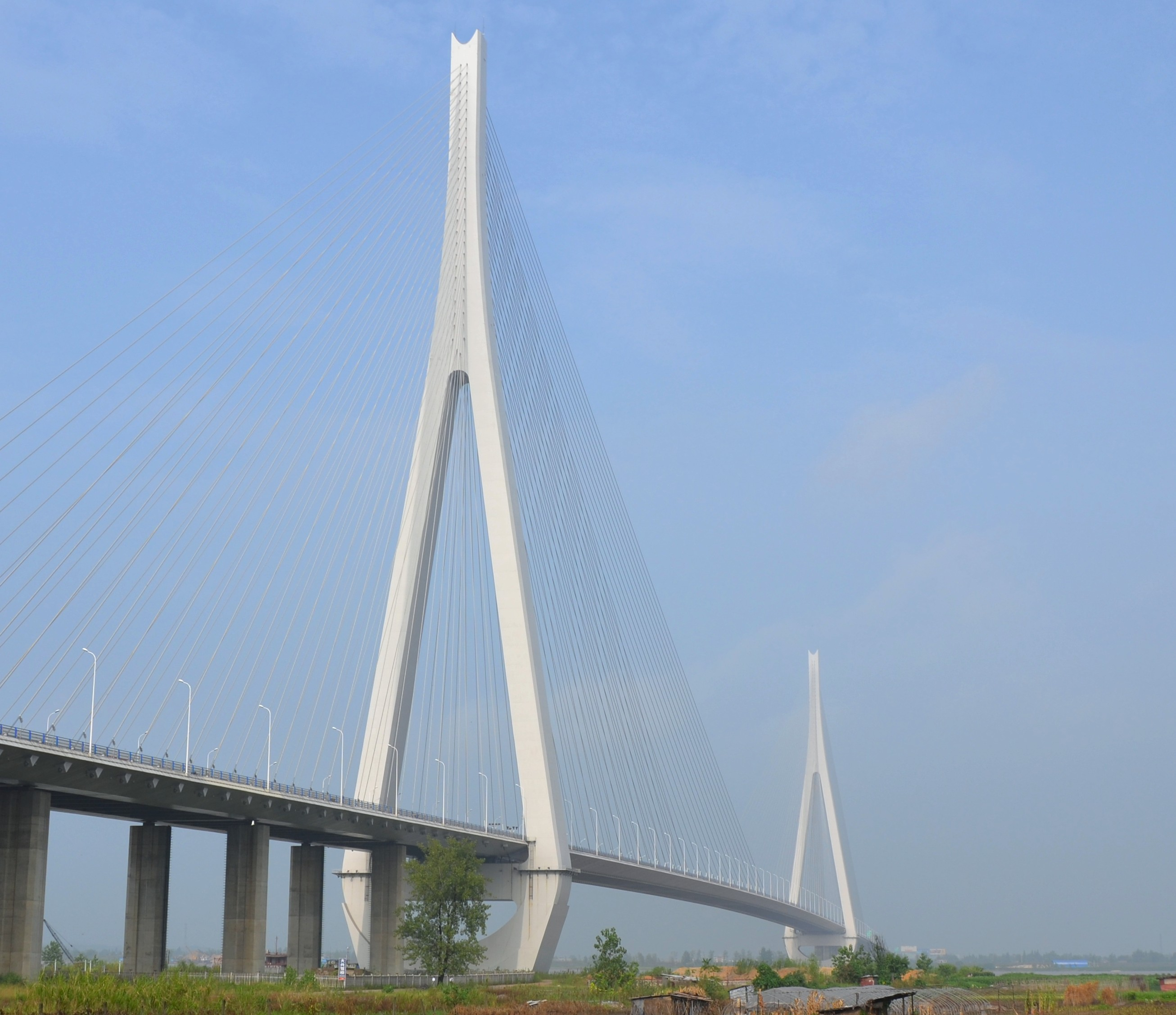
The Edong Bridge over the Yangtze River

Two bridges connect Huanggang across the Yangtze to the Ezhou on the south bank of the river:

- Ehuang Bridge, between the main urban area of Huanggang and Ezhou; it carries the China National Highway 106.
- Edong Bridge carries the G45 Daqing–Guangzhou Expressway and the G50 Shanghai–Chongqing Expressway.

Other river crossings near Huanggang include:

- Jiujiang Yangtze River Bridge, between Huangmei County and Jiujiang; a combined road-rail bridge, it carries the Huangxiao Expressway, China National Highway 105, and the Beijing–Kowloon railway
- Huangshi Bridge, which carries the Huanghuang Expressway from Xishui County to Huangshi

=== Rail ===
Huanggang is served by the Beijing–Kowloon Railway, which has several stations within the prefecture-level city. The Huangzhou Station, located within Huangzhou District some 20 km (12 mi) northeast from downtown Huanggang, has the best service of all, with several trains a day to Beijing, Nanchang, and Shenzhen. Huanggang travelers can also use the Huangshi station on the Wuhan–Jiujiang Railway, across the river.

== Famous people ==
Huanggang prefecture is the birthplace of numerous famous Chinese inventors, scientists, and scholars, including:

- Bi Sheng (毕昇), the inventor of movable type printing (Also known as one of the Four Great Inventions);
- Dayi Daoxin (四祖道信), the 4th Patriarch of Chán(Zen) Buddhism;
- Daman Hongren (五祖弘忍), the 5th Patriarch of Chán Buddhism;
- Li Shizhen (李时珍), herbalist and author of the ancient medical classic Compendium of Materia Medica;
- Cheng Yi (程颐), ancient idealist philosopher;
- Cheng Hao (程顥), founder of Neo-Confucianism, philosopher and politician in the Song dynasty;
- Dong Biwu (董必武), Acting President of the People's Republic of China, 1972–1975;
- Li Xiannian (李先念), former military leader and President of China;
- Lin Biao (林彪), former military leader and Vice President of China. One of the ten marshals in China;
- Chen Tanqiu (陈谭秋), a founding member of the Chinese Communist Party (CCP)
- Bao Huiseng (包惠僧), a founding member of the Chinese Communist Party (CCP)
- Li Siguang (李四光), ethnic Mongol ecologist;
- Wei Wenbo (魏文伯), former political leader and Minister of Justice of the People's Republic of China
- Wen Yiduo (闻一多), patriotic poet;
- Xiong Shili (熊十力), a 20th-century Chinese philosopher;
- Huang Kan (黄侃), a Chinese philologist.

As well, Huanggang is famous for producing military and political leaders. Hong'an County is known as the "County of Generals" in that more than 400 Chinese army generals have been born there, a total far greater than for any other county in all of China. In addition, former military leader and President of China, Li Xiannian (1909–1992), was born in Hong'an. The family of Taiwanese author Kuo Cheng came from Huanggang.
