= Huayuan Area =

Town in Nankai District, Tianjin, China

Huayuan (华苑小区) is a town of Nankai District, Tianjin, China. It has a population of 70,000.
