= Xishui County, Hubei =

Xishui County 浠水县 Sishui
- County
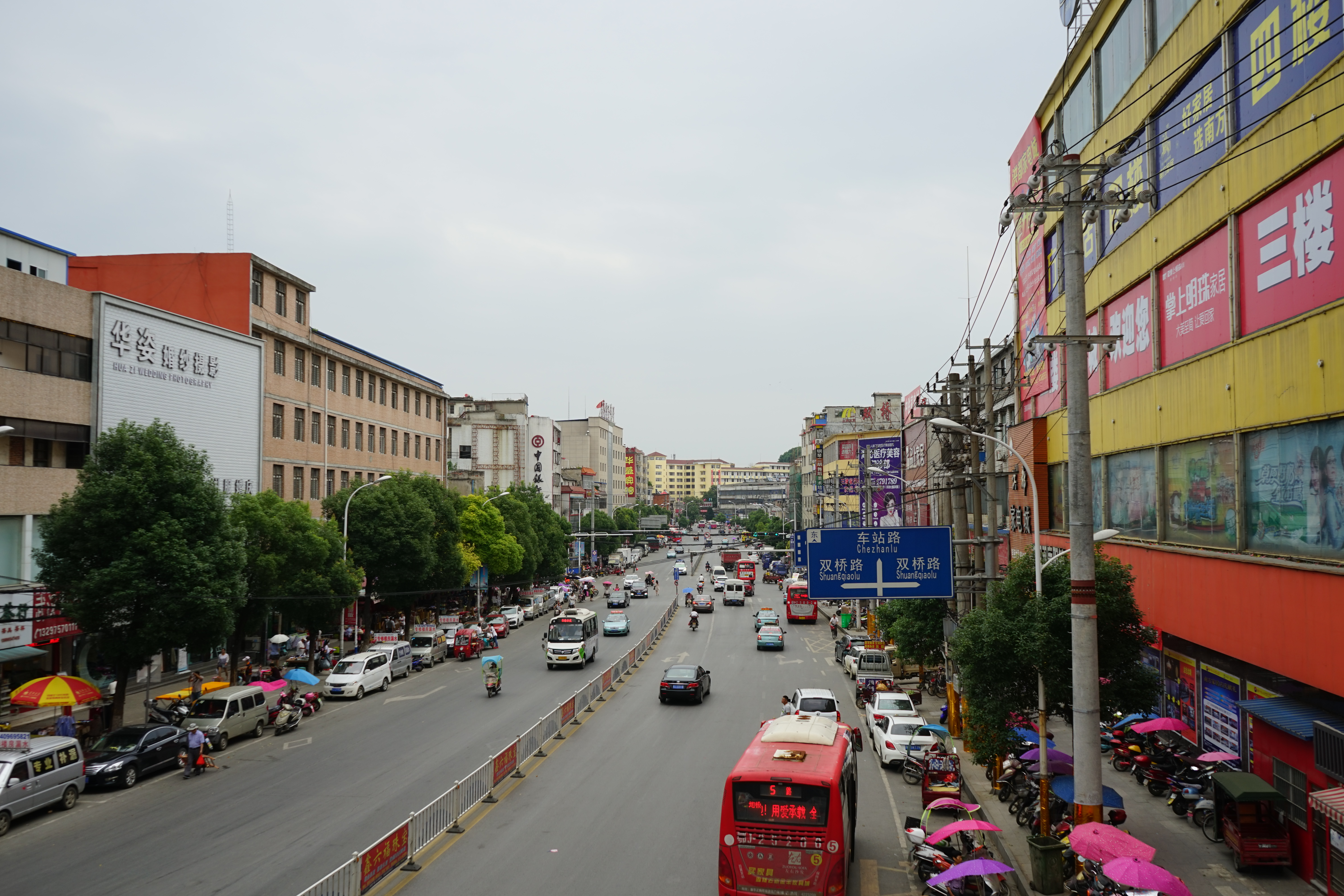

- Location in Hubei
- Coordinates (Xishui government): 30°27′07″N 115°15′58″E
- Country: People's Republic of China
- Province: Hubei
- Prefecture-level city: Huanggang

Area
  - Total: 1,961 km^{2} (757 sq mi)

Population (2020)
  - Total: 716,273
  - Density: 365.3/km^{2} (946.0/sq mi)
- Time zone: UTC+8 (China Standard)
- Website: 浠水县人民政府门户网 (Xishui County People's Government Web Portal) (in Simplified Chinese)

Xishui County (simplified Chinese: 浠水县; traditional Chinese: 浠水縣; pinyin: Xīshuǐ Xiàn) is a county of eastern Hubei province, People's Republic of China. The county extends over an area of 2,000 square kilometres (770 sq mi) and is under the administration of Huanggang City.

== History ==
Xishui was a center of revolutionary activity during the Chinese Civil War. In 1922, an underground group was formed to try to undermine the Kuomintang. Between 1926 and 1949, thousands of locals lost their lives in the struggle.

Famous persons whose ancestral home was Xishui County:

- Wen Yiduo (Chinese: 聞一多), famous writer of China.
- Yang Jisheng (historian) ( Chinese traditional: 楊繼繩), the author of Tomb: Great famine of China: 1959-1962 (Chinese name: < 墓碑:中國1959-1962年三年大饑荒>)
- Xu Fuguan, a Chinese historian and philosopher, notable for Confucian studies

== Geography ==
=== Administrative divisions ===
Xishui County administers:

#	Name	Chinese (S)
Towns
1	Qingquan	清泉镇
2	Bahe	巴河镇
3	Lanxi	兰溪镇
4	Sanhua	散花镇
5	Zhuwa	竹瓦镇
6	Wanggang	汪岗镇
7	Tuanpi	团陂镇
8	Bailian	白莲镇
9	Caihe	蔡河镇
10	Xianma	洗马镇
11	Dingsidang	丁司垱镇
12	Guankou	关口镇
Township
13	Lüyang	绿杨乡
Other Areas
14	Sanjiaoshan Forestry Area	三角山林场
15	Cehu Breeding Farm (formerly Qi Lake)	策湖养殖场
16	Xishui Economic Development Zone	经济开发区

== Climate ==
Climate data for Xishui, elevation 62 m (203 ft), (1991–2020 normals, extremes 1981–present)
Month	Jan	Feb	Mar	Apr	May	Jun	Jul	Aug	Sep	Oct	Nov	Dec	Year
Record high °C (°F)	22.2 (72.0)	27.1 (80.8)	34.7 (94.5)	34.9 (94.8)	36.4 (97.5)	38.1 (100.6)	39.7 (103.5)	40.1 (104.2)	38.8 (101.8)	35.5 (95.9)	30.6 (87.1)	23.9 (75.0)	40.1 (104.2)
Mean daily maximum °C (°F)	8.9 (48.0)	11.4 (52.5)	17.3 (63.1)	23.0 (73.4)	27.3 (81.1)	29.8 (85.6)	32.9 (91.2)	33.7 (92.7)	29.3 (84.7)	23.7 (74.7)	17.9 (64.2)	11.2 (52.2)	22.2 (72.0)
Daily mean °C (°F)	4.8 (40.6)	7.0 (44.6)	12.2 (54.0)	17.8 (64.0)	22.5 (72.5)	25.5 (77.9)	28.6 (83.5)	28.6 (83.5)	24.2 (75.6)	18.5 (65.3)	12.7 (54.9)	6.3 (43.3)	17.4 (63.3)
Mean daily minimum °C (°F)	1.8 (35.2)	3.7 (38.7)	8.2 (46.8)	13.4 (56.1)	18.4 (65.1)	22.2 (72.0)	25.2 (77.4)	24.9 (76.8)	20.5 (68.9)	14.6 (58.3)	9.0 (48.2)	2.7 (36.9)	13.7 (56.7)
Record low °C (°F)	−6.5 (20.3)	−5.4 (22.3)	−2.3 (27.9)	3.8 (38.8)	9.7 (49.5)	12.9 (55.2)	18.4 (65.1)	17.3 (63.1)	12.7 (54.9)	3.0 (37.4)	−2.0 (28.4)	−8.6 (16.5)	−8.6 (16.5)
Average precipitation mm (inches)	61.2 (2.41)	76.5 (3.01)	105.3 (4.15)	142.2 (5.60)	172.7 (6.80)	218.3 (8.59)	226.0 (8.90)	140.4 (5.53)	76.0 (2.99)	63.5 (2.50)	56.9 (2.24)	36.8 (1.45)	1,375.8 (54.17)
Average precipitation days (≥ 0.1 mm)	10.8	11.2	13.6	12.5	12.9	13.5	12.0	11.7	7.9	8.7	9.1	8.0	131.9
Average snowy days	3.4	1.9	0.6	0	0	0	0	0	0	0	0.2	0.9	7
Average relative humidity (%)	76	75	74	73	74	79	77	77	74	73	75	73	75
Mean monthly sunshine hours	97.6	101.5	127.2	153.3	171.0	161.5	212.6	218.8	175.2	160.5	137.3	125.4	1,841.9
Percentage possible sunshine	30	32	34	39	40	38	50	54	48	46	43	40	41
Source: China Meteorological Administration

== Natural resources ==
Xishui county has large proven reserves of ore, including magnetite, vanadium, copper, pyrite, yellow sand, granite, potassium, quartz, green jade, and gold.

== Economy ==
The very first agricultural cooperative in Hubei province was established at Xishui in 1952, as impoverished peasants pooled their land and cattle to create one large farm. In the first year, the commune increased its production by one third. The commune also expanded fresh-water fish and lotus root cultivation, and began planting two crops of rice per year. In 1956, the Xishui cooperative was recognized as an exemplary “national production growth model.” A major flood-control and irrigation reservoir was completed in 1961 and it began generating electricity the following year. This again became a national model for other villages to follow.

== Yangtze flooding ==
Xishui is subject to flooding from the Yangtze River. In 1996, the main dike wall shielding the village from the Yangtze broke in several places, endangering the entire county. Emergency support personnel from Qichun County and Wuxue City were required to help deal with the emergency. Since then, the dike was widened and raised in height.
