= Huanggang Normal University =

Provincial public college in Huanggang, Hubei, China

Coordinates: 30.447°N 114.927°E

- 黄冈师范学院
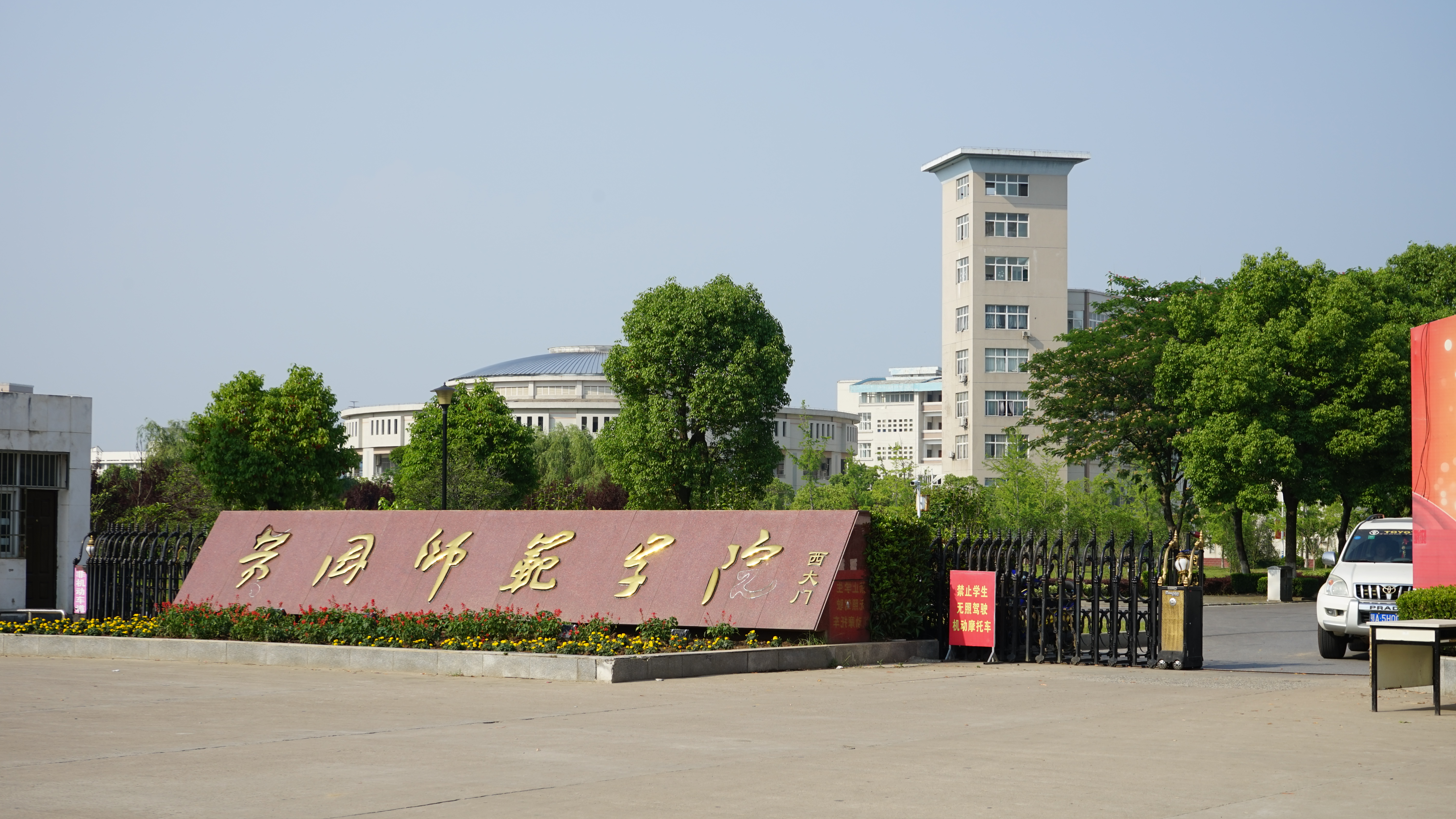
- Established: 1905
- Location: Huanggang, Hubei, China
- Campus: Urban
- Website: hgnc.net

Huanggang Normal University (HGNC; 黄冈师范学院; 'Huanggang Teachers College') is a provincial public undergraduate college in Huanggang, Hubei, China. It is affiliated with the Province of Hubei and sponsored by the Hubei Provincial People's Government. Despite the English name, the college has not been granted university status by the Ministry of Education of China.
