= Yi people =

Ethnic group in China, Vietnam, and Thailand

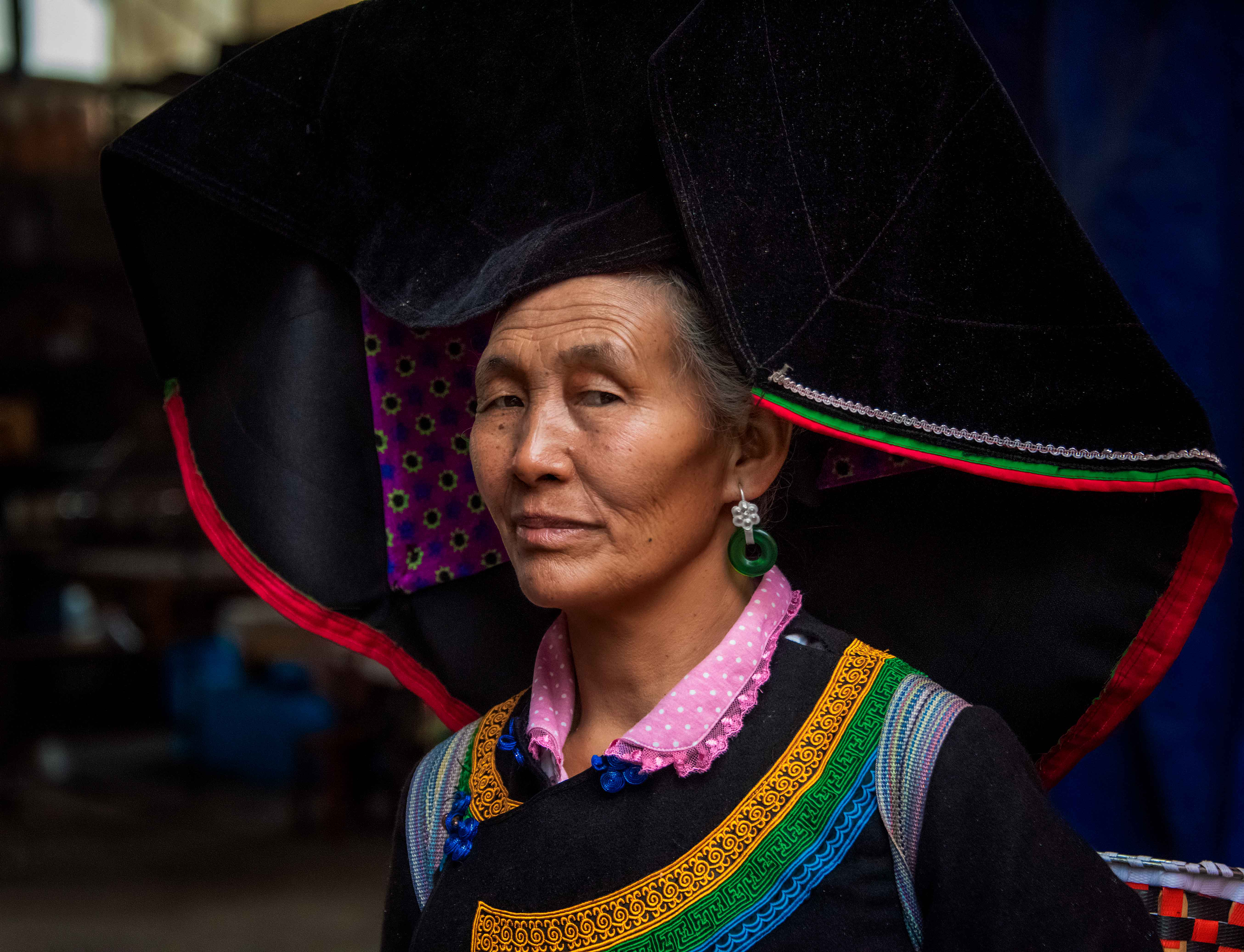
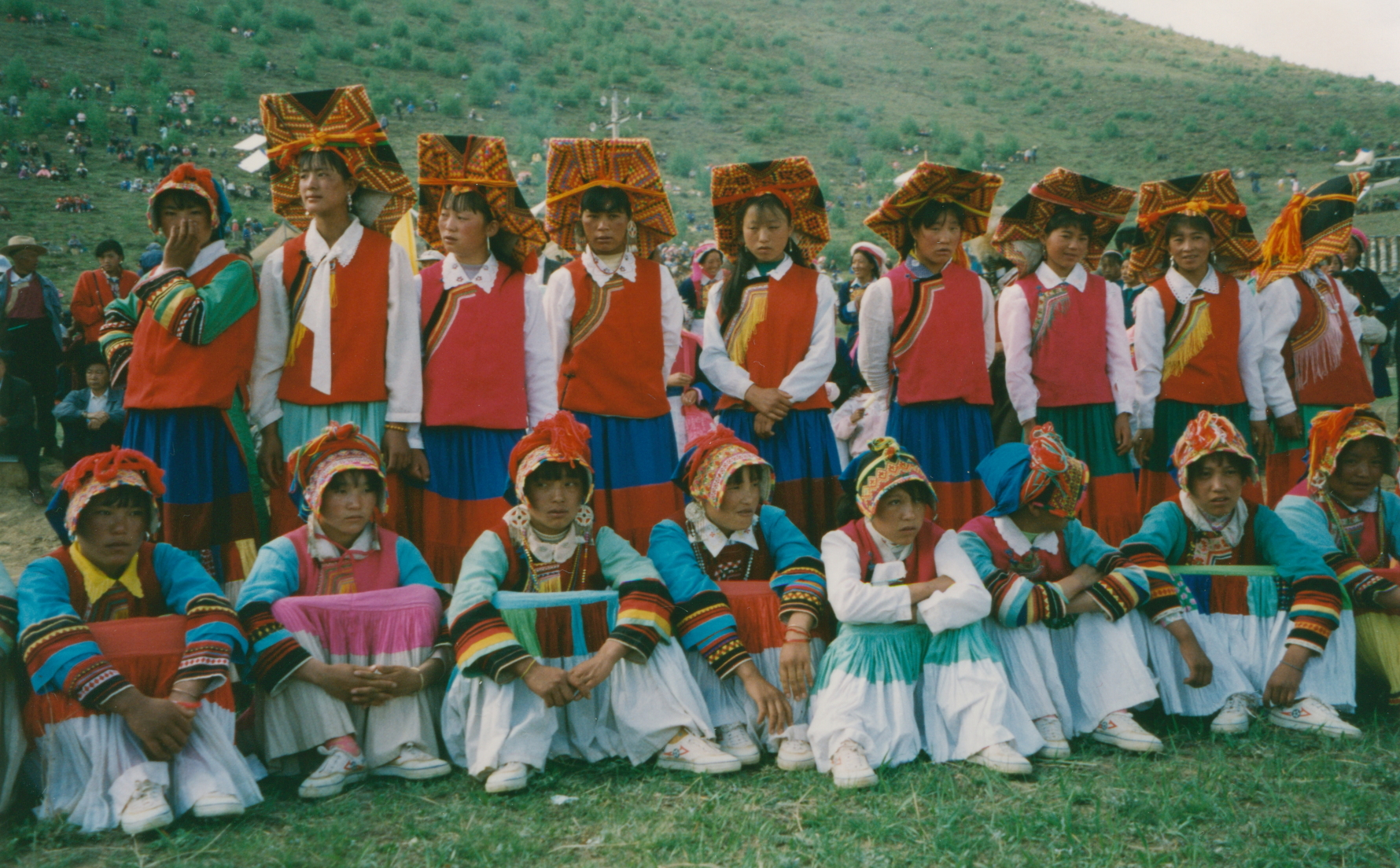
- Yi women in traditional dress

Regions with significant populations
- China: 9,830,327 (2020 census)
- Vietnam: 4,827 (2019)

Languages
- Yi, Southwestern Mandarin, Vietnamese (in Vietnam)

Religion
- Majority: Bimoism (native Yi variety of Shamanism); minority: Taoism • Islam

Related ethnic groups
- Tibetan, Bamar (Burman), Nakhi, Qiang, Tujia

Yi people

Chinese name
- Chinese: 彝族
Transcriptions
Standard Mandarin
- Hanyu Pinyin: Yízú
- Wade–Giles: Yi^{2}-tsu^{2}

Nuosu
- Simplified Chinese: 诺苏
- Traditional Chinese: 諾蘇
Transcriptions
Standard Mandarin
- Hanyu Pinyin: Nuòsū
- Wade–Giles: No^{4}-su^{1}

Lolo
- Chinese: 倮倮
Transcriptions
Standard Mandarin
- Hanyu Pinyin: Luǒ luǒ
- Wade–Giles: Lo^{3}-lo^{3}

Burmese name
- Burmese: ယီလူမျိုး

Vietnamese name
- Vietnamese: Lô Lô

Thai name
- Thai: โล-โล

Nuosu name
- Nuosu: ꆈꌠꉙ

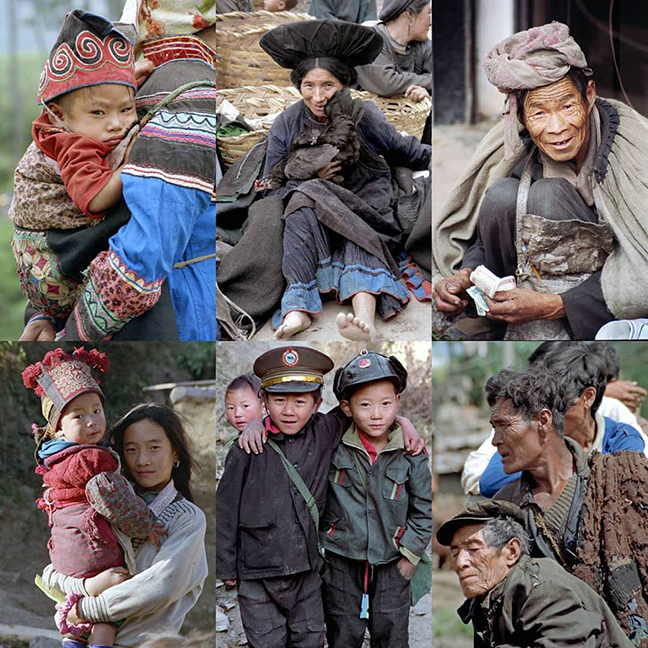
Black Nuosu Yi of Daliangshan

The Yi or Nuosu people (Nuosu: ꆈꌠ, [nɔ̄sū]; Chinese: 彝族; pinyin: Yízú; see also § Names and subgroups) are an ethnic group in southern China. Numbering nine million people, they are the sixth largest of the 55 ethnic minority groups recognized by the Chinese government. They live primarily in rural areas of Sichuan, Yunnan, Guizhou, and Guangxi, usually in mountainous regions. The Liangshan Yi Autonomous Prefecture is home to the largest population of Yi people within China, with two million Yi people in the region. In neighbouring Vietnam, as of 2019, there are 4,827 Lô Lô people (a subgroup of the Yi) living in the Hà Giang, Cao Bằng, and Lào Cai provinces, in the country's north.

The Yi speak various Loloish languages, closely related to Burmese. The prestige variety is Nuosu, which is written in the Yi script.

== Location ==
Of the more than 9 million Yi people, over 4.5 million live in Yunnan Province, 2.5 million live in southern Sichuan Province and 1 million live in the northwest corner of Guizhou Province. Nearly all the Yi live in mountainous areas, often carving out their existence on the sides of steep mountain slopes far from the cities of China.

The altitudinal differences of the Yi areas directly affect the climate and precipitation of these areas. These striking differences are the basis of the old saying that "The weather is different a few miles away" in the Yi area. Yi populations in different areas are very different from one another, making their living in completely different ways.

== Names and subgroups ==
Although different groups of Yi refer to themselves in different ways (including Nisu, Sani, Axi, Lolo, and Acheh) and sometimes speak mutually unintelligible languages, they have been grouped into a single ethnicity by the Chinese and the various local appellations can be classified into three groups:

- Ni (ꆀ). The appellations of Nuosu, Nasu, Nesu, Nisu and other similar names are considered derivatives of the original autonym Nip (ꆀ) appended with the suffix -su, indicating 'people'. The name Sani is also a variety of this group. Further, it is widely believed that the Chinese name Yí (both 夷 and 彝) were derived from Ni.
- Lolo. The appellations of Lolo, Lolopu, etc. are related to the Yi people's worship of the tiger, as lo in their dialects means 'tiger'. Lo is also the basis for the Chinese exonym Luóluó (猓猓, 倮倮 or 罗罗). The original character (猓), with the "dog radical" (犭) and a guǒ (果) phonetic, was a graphic pejorative, comparable to the Chinese name guǒran (猓然, 'a long-tailed ape'). Languages reforms in the PRC replaced the character in Luóluó twice—first by Luó (倮), with the "human radical" (亻) and the same phonetic, but that was a graphic variant for luǒ (裸, 'naked'), and later by Luó (罗, 'net for catching birds'). Paul K. Benedict noted, "a leading Chinese linguist, has remarked that the name 'Lolo' is offensive only when written with the 'dog' radical."
- Other. This group includes various other appellations of different groups of Yi. Some of them may be of other ethnic groups but are recognised as Yi by the Chinese. The "Pu" may be relevant to an ancient ethnic group Pu (濮). In the legends of the Northern Yi, the Yi people conquered Pu and its territory in the northeastern part of the modern Liangshan.

Groups listed below are sorted by their broad linguistic classification and the general geographic area where they live. Within each section, larger groups are listed first.

| Classification | Approximate total population | Groups |
|---|---|---|
| Southern | 1,082,120 | Nisu, Southern Nasu, Muji, A Che, Southern Gaisu, Pula, Boka, Lesu, Chesu, Laowu, Alu, Azong, Xiuba |
| Southeastern | 729,760 | Poluo, Sani, Axi, Azhe, Southeastern Lolo, Jiasou, Puwa, Aluo, Awu, Digao, Meng, Xiqi, Ati, Daizhan, Asahei, Laba, Zuoke, Ani, Minglang, Long |
| Central | 565,080 | Lolopo, Dayao Lipo, Central Niesu, Enipu, Lopi, Popei |
| Eastern | 1,456,270 | Eastern Nasu, Panxian Nasu, Wusa Nasu, Shuixi Nosu, Wuding Lipo, Mangbu Nosu, Eastern Gepo, Naisu, Wumeng, Naluo, Samei, Sanie, Luowu, Guopu, Gese, Xiaohei Neisu, Dahei Neisu, Depo, Laka, Lagou, Aling, Tushu, Gouzou, Wopu, Eastern Samadu |
| Western | 1,162,040 | Mishaba Laluo, Western Lolo, Xiangtang, Xinping Lalu, Yangliu Lalu, Tusu, Gaiji, Jiantou Laluo, Xijima, Limi, Mili, Lawu, Qiangyi, Western Samadu, Western Gepo, Xuzhang Lalu, Eka, Western Gaisu, Suan, Pengzi |
| Northern | 2,534,120 | Shengba Nosu, Yinuo Nosu, Xiaoliangshan Nosu, Butuo Nosu, Suodi, Tianba Nosu, Bai Yi, Naruo, Naru, Talu, Mixisu, Liwu, Northern Awu, Tagu, Liude, Naza, Ta'er |
| Unclassified | 55,490 | Michi (Miqie), Jinghong Nasu, Apu, Muzi, Tanglang, Micha, Ayizi, Guaigun |

== History ==
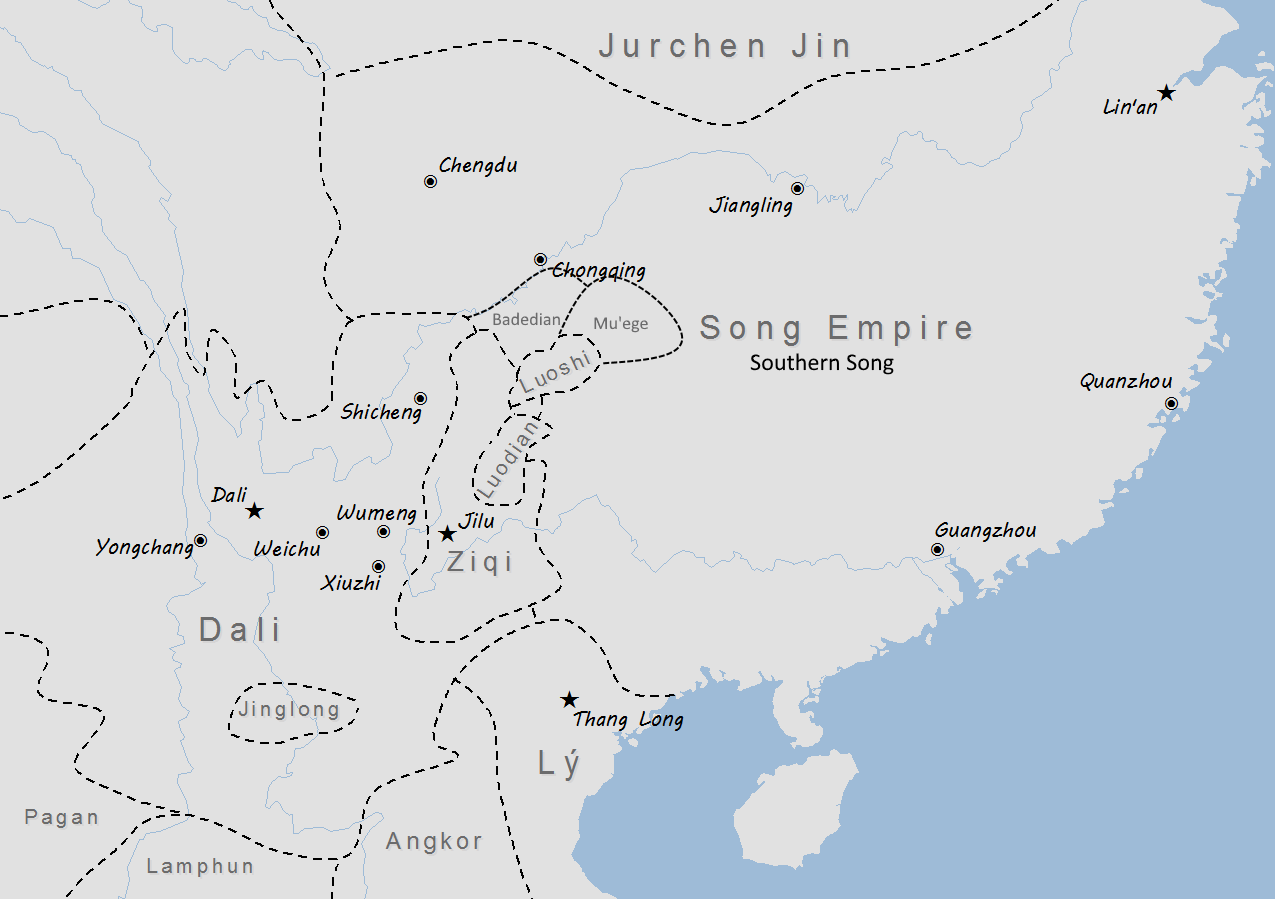
Mu'ege and other Yi kingdoms contemporary to Southern Song

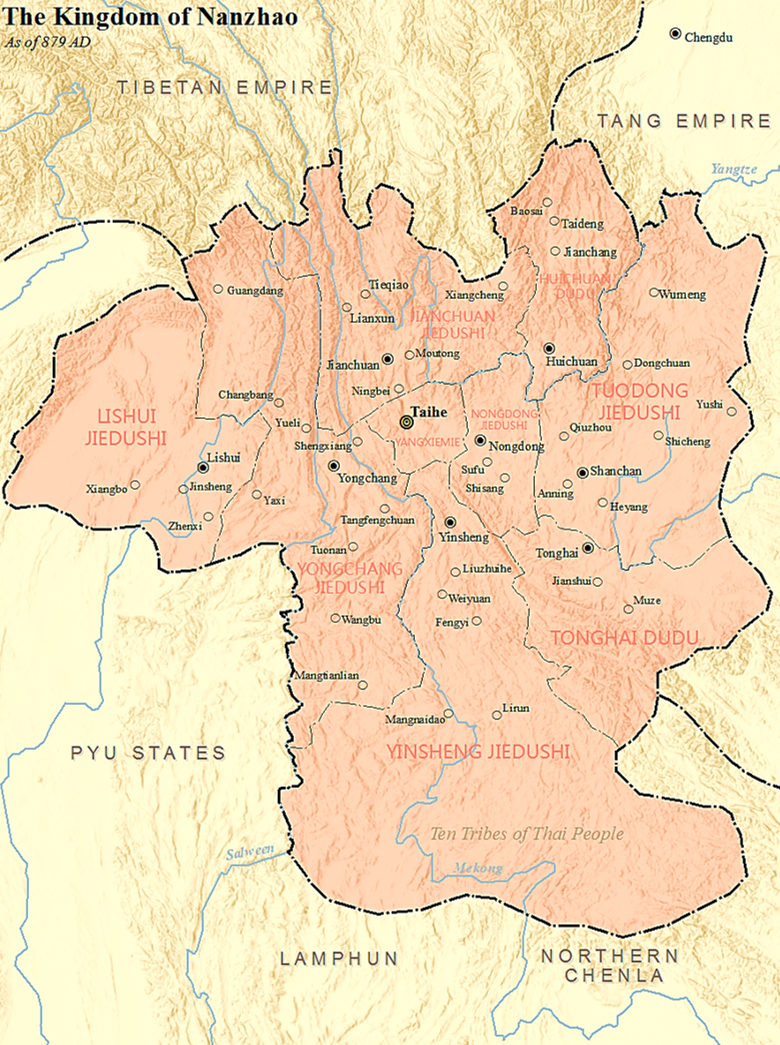
The Yi kingdom of Nanzhao

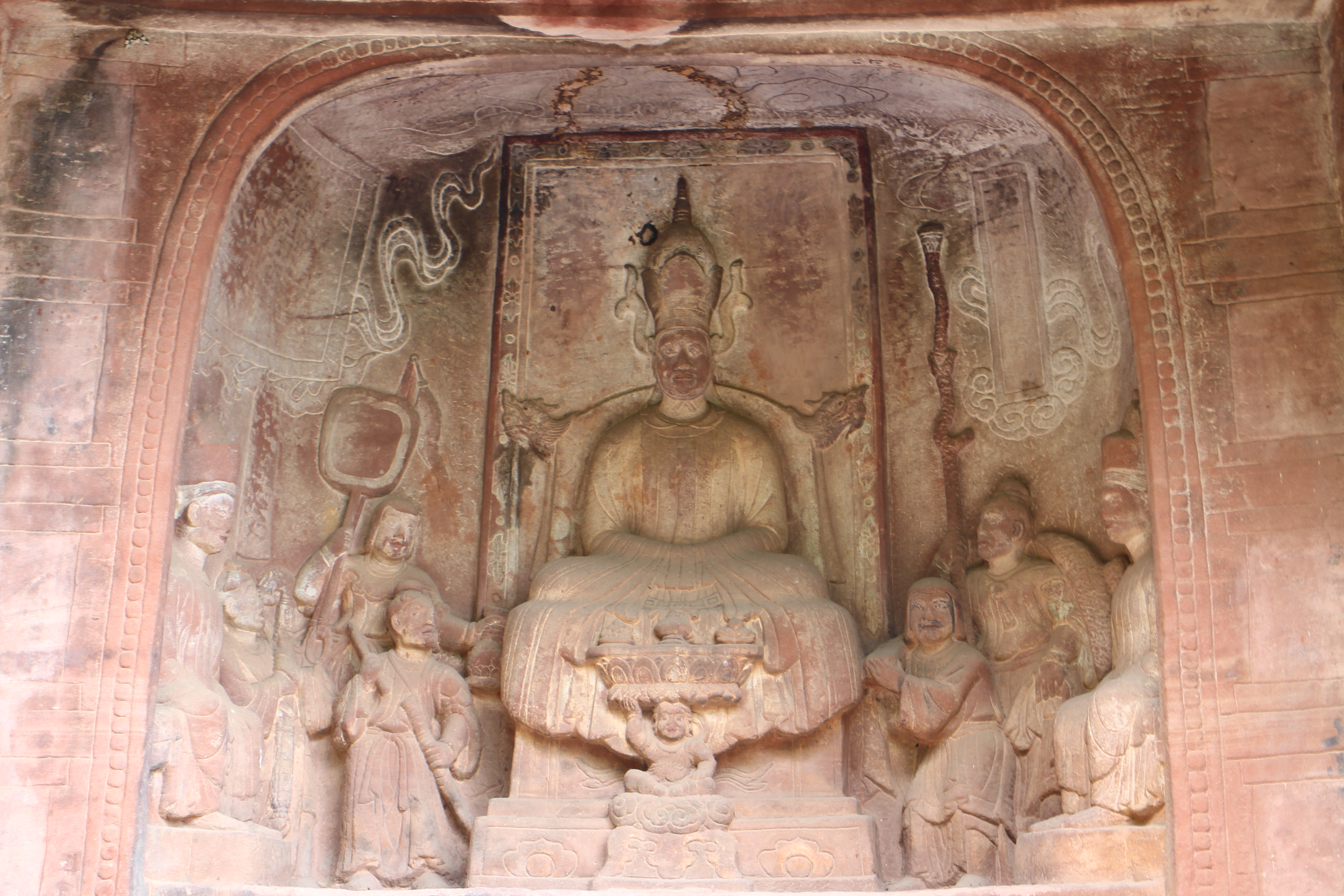
Carving of the king of Nanzhao Yimouxun (r. 779–808)

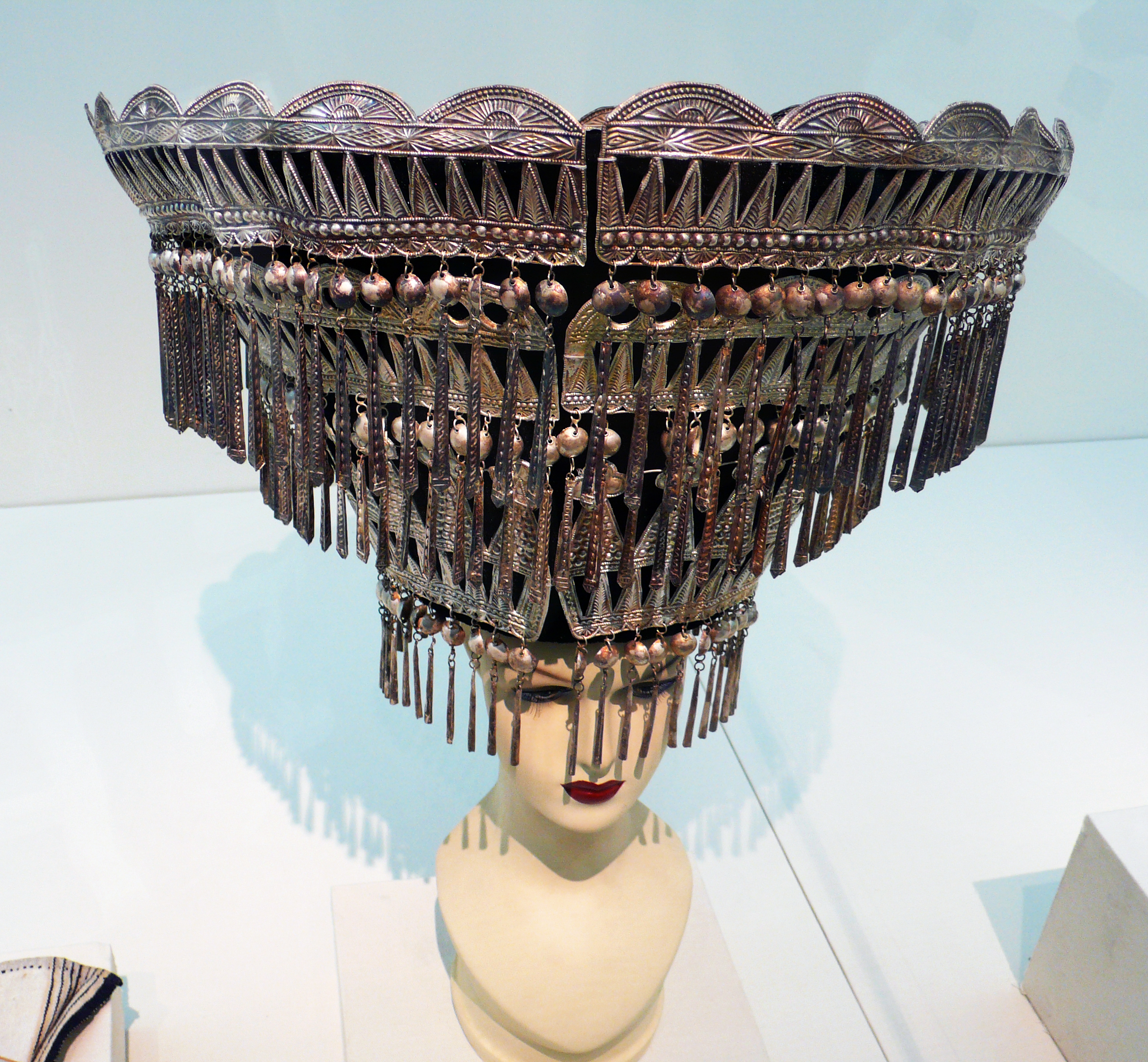
Yi silver headdress

=== Origin myth ===
According to Yi legend, all life originated in water and water was created by snowmelt, which as it dripped down, created a creature called the Ni. The Ni gave birth to all life. Ni is another name for the Yi people. It is sometimes translated as black because black is a revered color in Yi culture. Yi tradition tells us that their common ancestor was named Apu Dumu ꀉꁌꅋꃅ or ꀉꁌꐧꃅ (Axpu Ddutmu or Axpu Jjutmu). Apu Dumu had three wives, each of whom had two sons. The six sons migrated to the area that is now Zhaotong and spread out in the four directions, creating the Wu, Zha, Nuo, Heng, Bu, and Mo clans. The Yi practiced a lineage system where younger brothers were treated as slaves by their elders, which resulted in a culture of migration where younger brothers constantly left their villages to create their own domains.

=== Guizhou kingdoms ===
The Heng clan divided into two branches. One branch, known as the Wumeng, settled along the western slope of the Wumeng Mountain range, extending their control as far west as modern day Zhaotong, Yunnan. The other branch, known as the Chele, moved along the eastern slope of the Wumeng Mountain range and settled to the north of the Chishui River. By the Tang dynasty (618–907), the Chele occupied the area from today Xuyong county in Sichuan to Bijie city in Guizhou. The Bu clan fragmented into four branches. The Bole branch settled in Anshun, the Wusa branch settled in Weining, the Azouchi branch settled in Zhanyi, and the Gukuge branch settled in northeast Yunnan. The Mo clan, descended from Mujiji (慕齊齊), split into three branches. One branch known as the Awangren, led by Wualou, settled in southwest Guizhou and formed the Ziqi Kingdom. Wuake led the second branch, the Ayuxi, to settle near Ma'an Mountain south of Huize. Wuana led the third branch to settle in Hezhang. In the 3rd century AD, Wuana's branch split into the Mangbu branch in Zhenxiong, led by Tuomangbu, and Luodian (羅甸) in Luogen, led by Tuoazhe. By 300, Luodian covered over much of the Shuixi region. Its ruler, Moweng (莫翁), moved the capital to Mugebaizhage (modern Dafang), where he renamed his realm the Mu'ege kingdom, otherwise known as the Chiefdom of Shuixi.

Nasu Yi kingdoms by the Tang dynasty
| Kingdom | Ruling clan | Modern area |
|---|---|---|
| Badedian | Mangbu | Zhenxiong |
| Luodian/Luoshi | Bole | Anshun |
| Mu'ege | Luo | Dafang |
| Ziqi/Yushi | Awangren | Southwest Guizhou |

After the Eastern Han dynasty, the Shu of the Three Kingdoms conducted several wars against the ancestors of Yi under the lead of Zhuge Liang. They defeated the king of Yi, ꂽꉼ (Mot Hop, 孟获) and expanded their conquered territory in Yi area. After that, the Jin Dynasty succeeded Shu as the suzerain of Yi area but with weak control.

To further solidify a buffer zone between itself and the expansionistic Nanzhao kingdom, in 846 the Tang bestowed upon the patriarch of the Bole patriclan the hereditary title King of the Luodian kingdom (Luodian guo wang). In the same year the Tang forged a relationship with the Awangren branch of the Mo patriclan, which had settled in the Panxian–Puan area of southwest Guizhou, and recognized the Awangren as leaders of the Yushi kingdom. A year later, in 847, the Tang acknowledged the formation of the Badedian kingdom located in northeast Yunnan and headed by the Mangbu branch of the Azhe patriclan. These four kingdoms, Zangge (Mu'ege), Luodian, Yushi, and Badedian formed an initial Tang defensive perimeter between Nanzhao-controlled territory to the southwest and Tang China.

— John E. Herman

=== Yunnan kingdoms ===
Some historians believe that the majority of the kingdom of Nanzhao were of the Bai people, but that the elite spoke a variant of Nuosu (also called Yi), a Tibeto-Burman language closely related to Burmese. The Cuanman people came to power in Yunnan during Zhuge Liang's Southern Campaign in 225. By the fourth century they had gained control of the region, but they rebelled against the Sui dynasty in 593 and were destroyed by a retaliatory expedition in 602. The Cuan split into two groups known as the Black and White Mywa. The White Mywa (Baiman) tribes, who are considered the predecessors of the Bai people, settled on the fertile land of western Yunnan around the alpine fault lake Erhai. The Black Mywa (Wuman), considered to be predecessors of the Yi people, settled in the mountainous regions of eastern Yunnan. These tribes were called Mengshe (蒙舍), Mengxi (蒙嶲), Langqiong (浪穹), Tengtan (邆賧), Shilang (施浪), and Yuexi (越析). Each tribe was known as a zhao. In academia, the ethnic composition of the Nanzhao kingdom's population has been debated for a century. Chinese scholars tend to favour the theory that the rulers came from the aforementioned Bai or Yi groups, while some non-Chinese scholars subscribed to the theory that the Tai ethnic group was a major component, that later moved south into modern-day Thailand and Laos.

In 649, the chieftain of the Mengshe tribe, Xinuluo (細奴邏), founded the Great Meng (大蒙) and took the title of Qijia Wang (奇嘉王; "Outstanding King"). He acknowledged Tang suzerainty. In 652, Xinuluo absorbed the White Mywa realm of Zhang Lejinqiu, who ruled Erhai Lake and Cang Mountain. This event occurred peacefully as Zhang made way for Xinuluo of his own accord. The agreement was consecrated under an iron pillar in Dali. Thereafter the Black and White Mywa acted as warriors and ministers respectively.

In 704, the Tibetan Empire made the White Mywa tribes into vassals or tributaries.

In the year 737 AD, with the support of the Tang dynasty, the great-grandson of Xinuluo, Piluoge (皮羅閣), united the six zhaos in succession, establishing a new kingdom called Nanzhao (Mandarin, "Southern Zhao"). The capital was established in 738 at Taihe, (the site of modern-day Taihe village, a few miles south of Dali). Located in the heart of the Erhai valley, the site was ideal: it could be easily defended against attack and it was in the midst of rich farmland. Under the reign of Piluoge, the White Mywa were removed from eastern Yunnan and resettled in the west. The Black and White Mywa were separated to create a more solidified caste system of ministers and warriors.

Nanzhao existed for 165 years until A.D. 902. After 35 years of tangled warfare, Duan Siping (段思平) of the Bai birth founded the Dali Kingdom, succeeding the territory of Nanzhao. Most Yi of that time were under the ruling of Dali. Dali's sovereign reign lasted for 316 years until it was conquered by Kublai Khan. During the era of Dali, Yi people lived in the territory of Dali but had little communication with the royalty of Dali.

Kublai Khan included Dali in his domain. The Yuan emperors remained firmly in control of the Yi people and the area they inhabited as part of Kublai Khan's Yunnan Xingsheng (云南行省) at current Yunnan, Guizhou, and part of Sichuan. In order to enhance its sovereign over the area, the Yuan dynasty set up a dominion for Yi, Luoluo Xuanweisi (罗罗宣慰司), the name of which means local appeasement government for Lolos. Although technically under the rule of the Yuan emperor, the Yi still had autonomy during the Yuan dynasty. The gulf between aristocrats and the common people increased during this time.

=== Ming and Qing dynasties ===
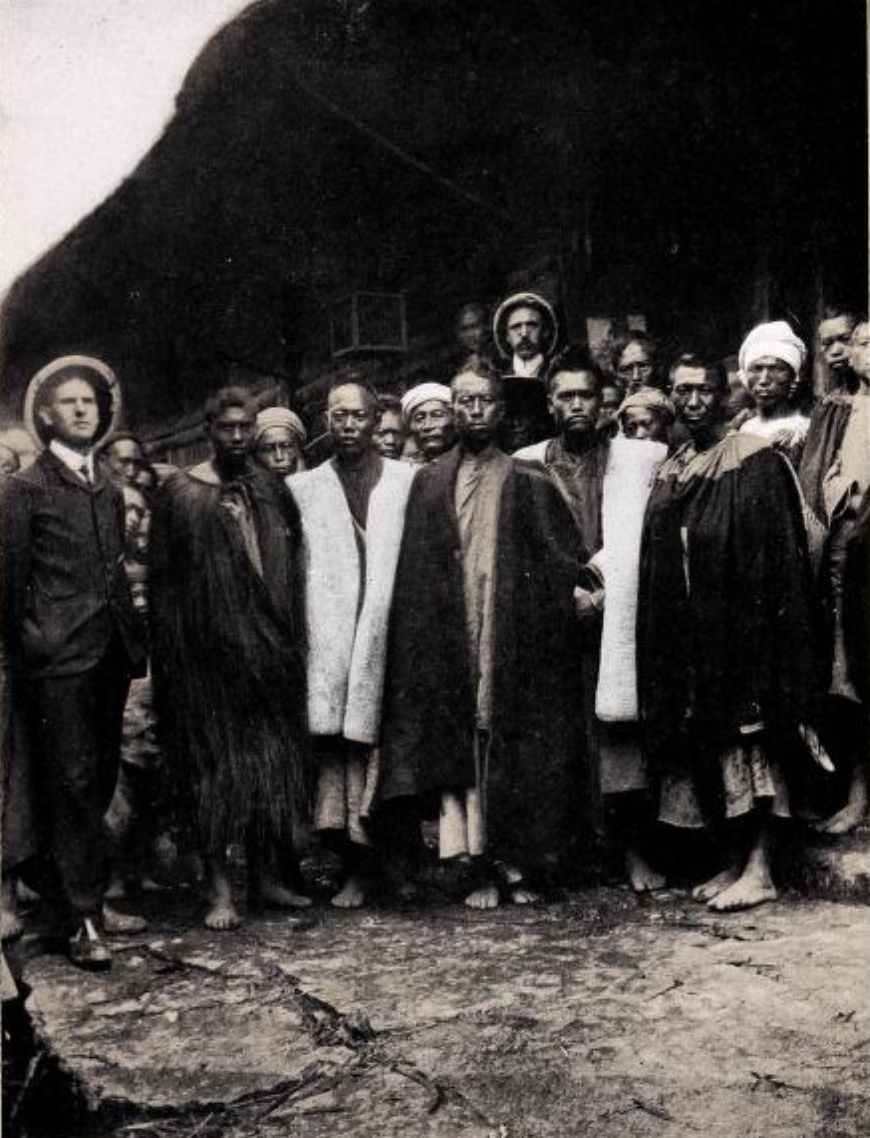
Canadian Methodist missionaries William John Mortimore and Charles Winfield Service among the Yi tribesmen of southwestern Sichuan, before 1911.

Beginning with the Ming dynasty, the Chinese empire expedited its cultural assimilation policy in Southwestern China, spreading the policy of gaitu guiliu (改土歸流, 'replacing tusi (local chieftains) with "normal" officials'). The governing power of many Yi feudal lords had previously been expropriated by the successors of officials assigned by the central government. With the progress of gaitu guiliu, the Yi area was dismembered into many communities both large and small, and it was difficult for the communities to communicate with each other as there were often Han-ruled areas between them.

The Kangxi Emperor of the Qing dynasty defeated Wu Sangui and took over the land of Yunnan and established a provincial government there. When Ortai became the Viceroy of Yunnan and Guizhou during the era of Yongzheng Emperor, the policy of gaitu guiliu and cultural assimilation against Yi were strengthened. Under these policies, Yi who lived near Kunming were forced to abandon their convention of traditional cremation and adopt burial, a policy which triggered rebellions among the Yi. The Qing dynasty suppressed these rebellions.

=== Modern era ===
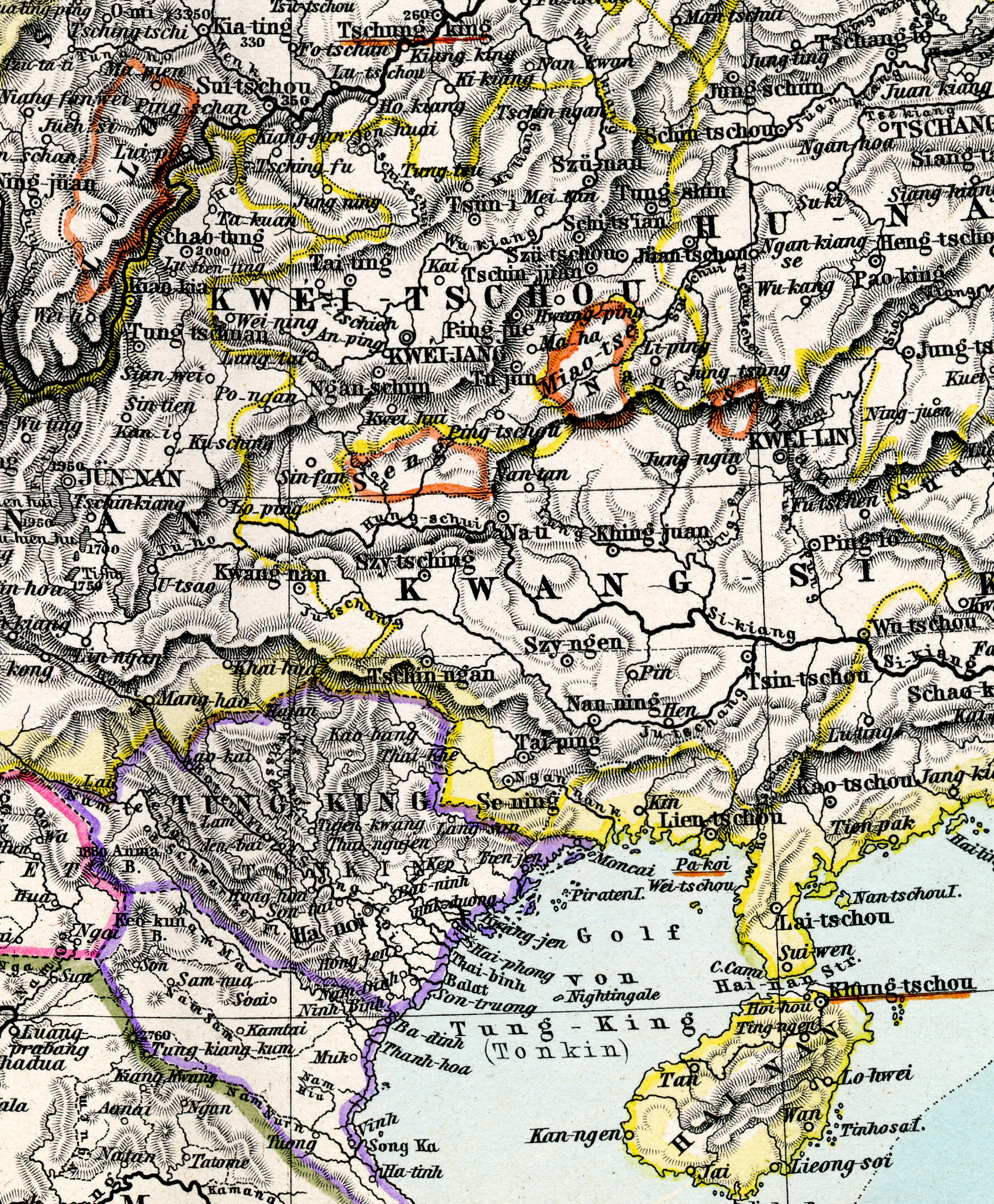
1891 map showing a "Lolo" enclave in modern Liangshan, Sichuan

Long Yun, a Yi, was the military governor of Yunnan, during the Republic of China rule on mainland China.

The Fourth Front Army of the CCP encountered the Yi people during the Long March and many Yi joined the communist forces.

During the 1939-1941 construction of the Leshan-to-Xichang road, which connected Sichuan to the Yunnan-Burma highway, Yi people were an important source for guides and workers. The Yunnan-Burma highway was an important transportation connection between the Nationalist government in Chongqing and the World War 2 Allied Forces.

After the establishment of the PRC, several Yi autonomous administrative districts of prefecture or county level were set up in Sichuan, Yunnan and Guizhou. With the development of automotive traffic and telecommunications, the communications among different Yi areas have been increasing sharply.

Yi people face systematic discrimination and abuse as migrant laborers in contemporary China.

=== Yi polities throughout history ===
- Cuanmans
- Mu'ege Kingdom (circa 300–1279), afterwards known as the Chiefdom of Shuixi from 1279 to 1698
- Nanzhao Empire (738–937)
- Luodian Kingdom (羅甸國) of the Bole clan in present-day Luodian County, Yunnan
- Badedian Kingdom of the Mangbu Azhe clan in present-day Zhenxiong
- Luogui Kingdom (羅鬼國) (10th century–1278) in Guizhou
- Ziqi Kingdom (Yushi) (自杞國) (1100–1260) of the Awangren clan in present-day Xingyi, Guizhou
- Kingdom of Shu (1621–1629), a short-lived state during the She-An Rebellion

== Language ==
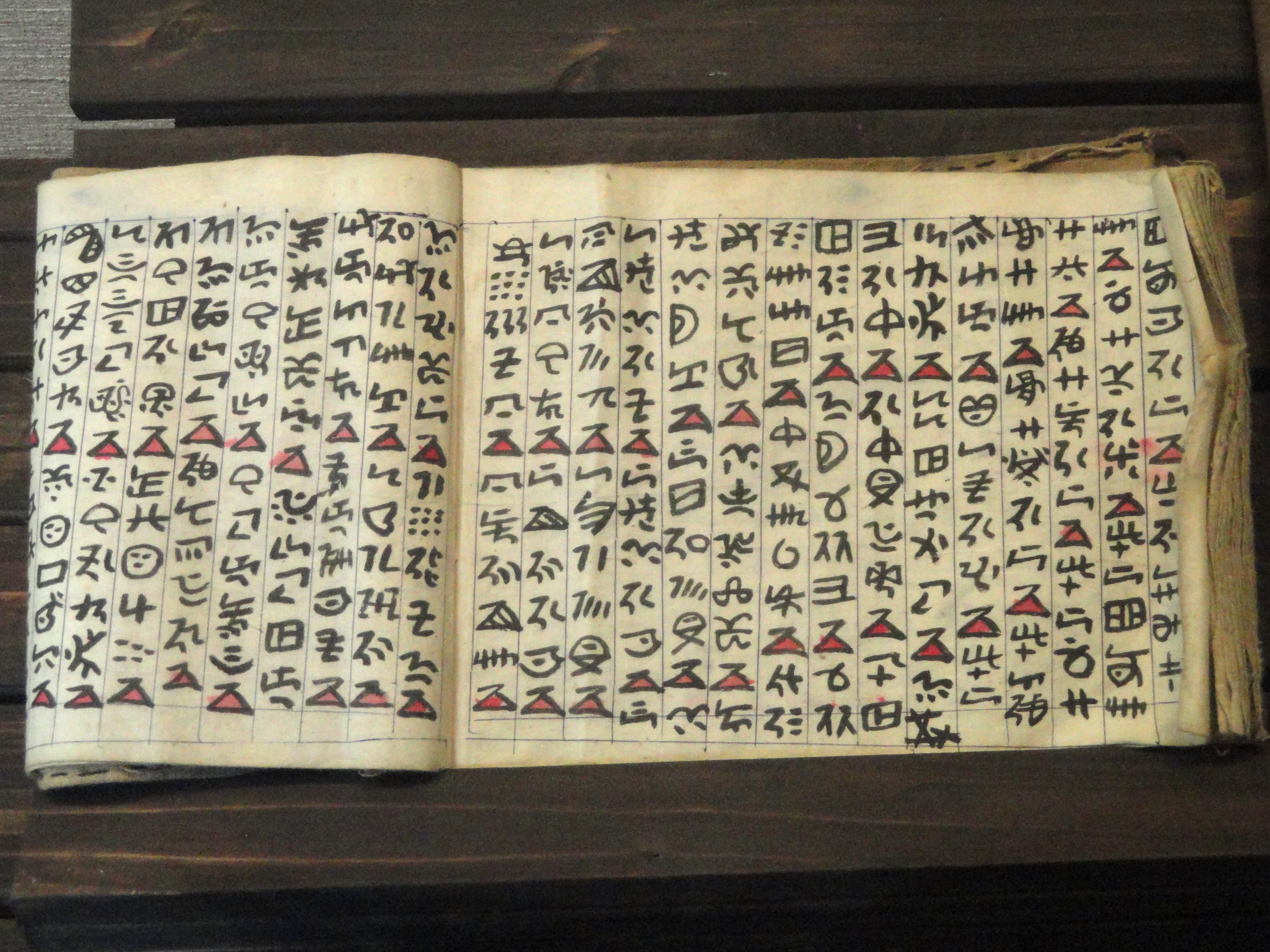
A religious document in ancient Yi script

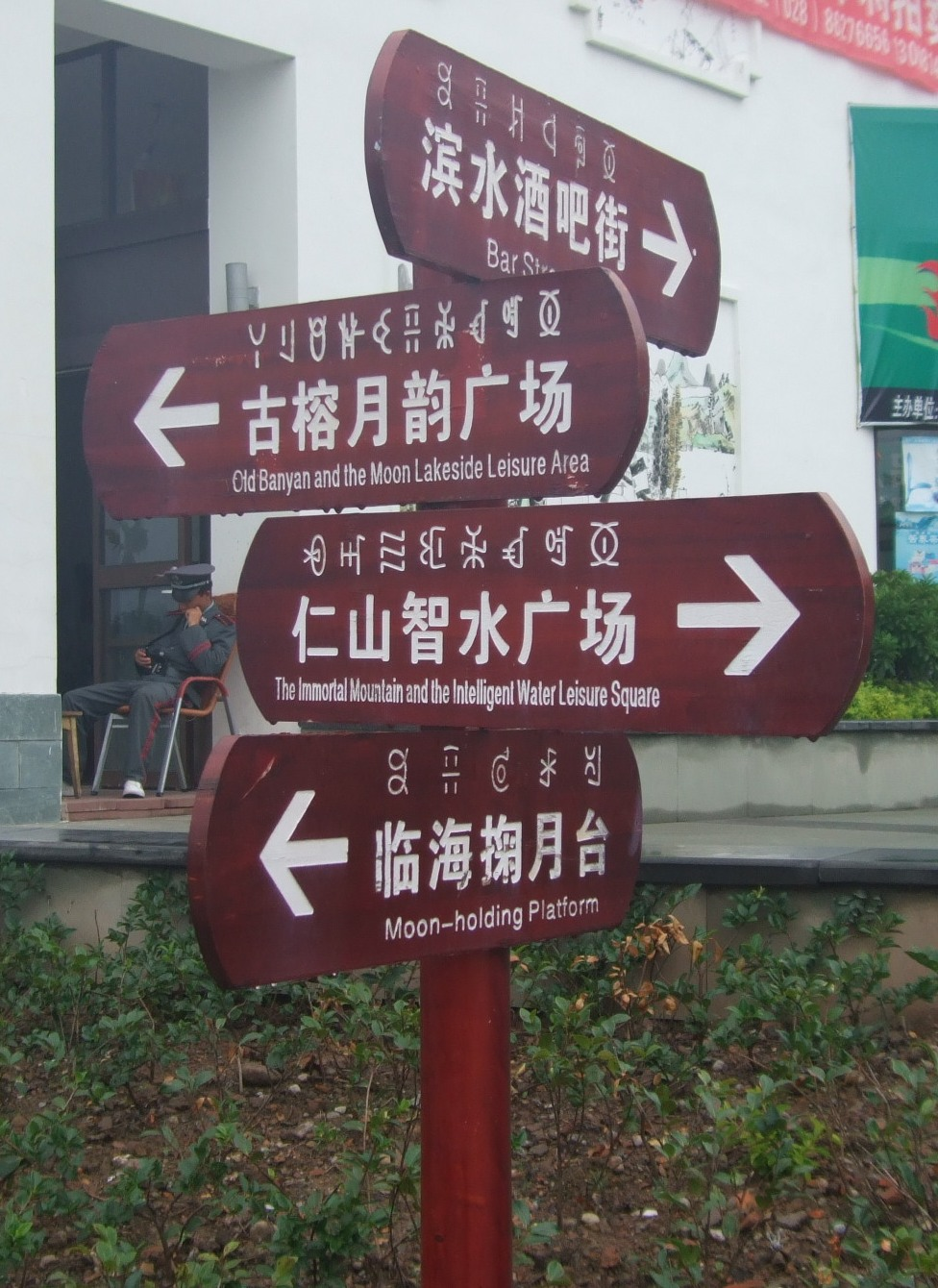
Signpost in modern Yi

The Chinese government recognizes six mutually unintelligible Yi languages, from various branches of the Loloish family:

- Northern Yi (Nuosu 诺苏)
- Western Yi (Lalo 腊罗)
- Central Yi (Lolopo 倮倮泼)
- Southern Yi (Nisu 尼苏)
- Southeastern Yi (Sani 撒尼)
- Eastern Yi (Nasu 纳苏)

Northern Yi is the largest with some two million speakers and is the basis of the literary language. It is an analytic language. There are also ethnically Yi languages of Vietnam which use the Yi script, such as Mantsi.

Many Yi in Yunnan, Guizhou, and Guangxi know Standard Chinese and code-switching between Yi and Chinese is common.

=== Script ===
The Yi script was originally logosyllabic like Chinese and dates to at least the 13th century, but seems to be completely independent of any other known script. Until the early 20th century, usage of this script was primarily the domain of bimo priests for transmitting ritual texts from generation to generation. It was not until the mid-twentieth century that elite families in Liangshan began to use the script for non-religious purposes, such as letter writing.

There were perhaps 10,000 characters, many of which were regional, since the script had never been standardized across the Yi peoples. A number of works of history, literature and medicine, as well as genealogies of the ruling families, written in the Old Yi script are still in use and there are Old Yi stone tablets and steles in the area.

An attempt to romanize the script was made in the 1950s but it failed to gain traction. In the 1970s and 1980s, the traditional script was standardized into a syllabary. Syllabic Yi is widely used in books, newspapers, street signs, and education, although with increasing influence from Chinese.

== Culture ==
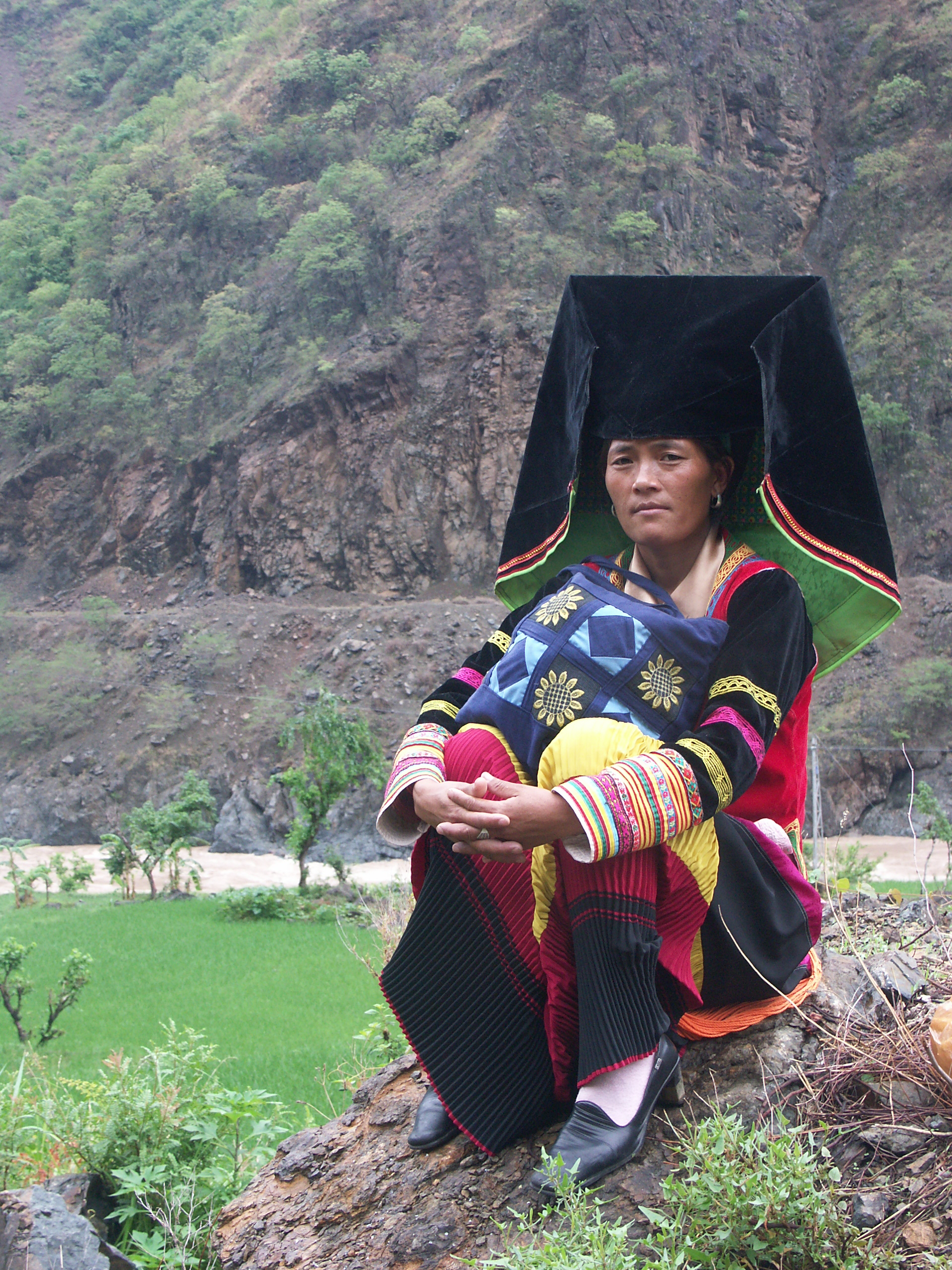
A Yi woman in traditional dress

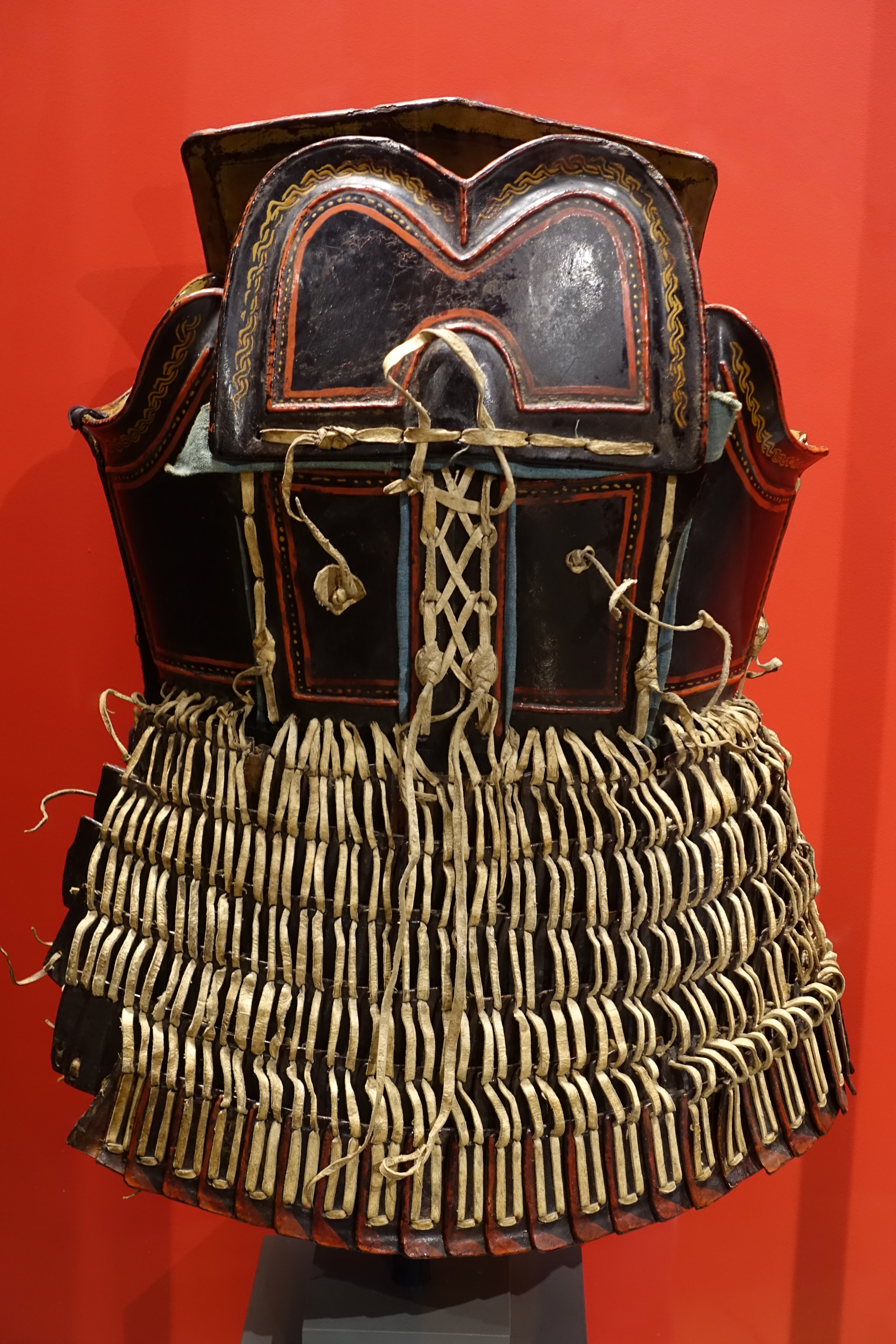
Armor of Yi people, Qing dynasty

=== Gender ===
Descent and inheritance in Yi society was traditionally patrilineal and men were generally considered superior to women. Men practiced polygamy and levirate marriage. Women were excluded from oral genealogies. In certain locales, Yi women still lag behind men in terms of primary education and very few Yi women become educational instructors or political leaders. Yi women noticeably drank and smoked more than Han Chinese women.

=== Names ===
The Yi use what has been described as a father-son patronymic naming system. According to the popular conception of the Yi patronymic naming system, the last character of the father's name transfers to become the first character of the son's name. The last character of the son's name is then used as the first character of the grandson's name. However this is not strictly a name per se but rather a shortening of the genealogical system which links the father and son across generations. A complete Yi name is composed of the clan name, the branch clan name, the father's name, and the person's own name (ex. Aho Bbujji Jjiha Lomusse). Aho is the name of a tribe, Bbuji is the name of a clan, Jjiha is the father's name, and Lomusse is a personal name. The name therefore means Lomusse the son of Jjiha of the Bbujji clan of the Aho tribe. Within the clan he would just be called Lomusse and within the tribe he would be called Jjiha Lomusse. Yi names use the suffixes -sse and -mo to express maleness and femaleness respectively. When the genealogy of a person is recited, only the father-son linkage is used to make it easier: Aho Ddezze—Ddezze Zuluo—Zuluo Jjiha—Jjiha Lomusse—Lomu Shuogge. This caused the assumption that the Yi practiced a father-son linkage system when it was actually a traditional genealogical recitation pattern.

The names of Nanzhao rulers have been transcribed according to this system with the first character representing the father's name:

- (Xi)nuluo
- (Luo)sheng
- (Sheng)luopi
- (Pi)luoge
- (Ge)luofeng
- (Feng)jiayi
- (Yi)mouxun
- (Xun)gequan
- (Quan)fengyou – sought to imitate Chinese practices and only went by Fengyou; broke tradition and named his son Shilong
- Shilong
- (Long)shun
- (Shun)huazhen

This is a tradition closely tied to Tibeto-Burman traditions and suggests that the rulers of Nanzhao were not Tai people.

=== Slavery ===
Traditional Yi society was divided into four castes, the aristocratic nuohuo/nzymo Black Yi, the commoner qunuo/quho White Yi, the ajia/mgajie, and the xiaxi/gaxy. The Black Yi made up around 7 per cent of the population while the White Yi made up 50 per cent of the population. The two castes did not intermarry and the Black Yi were always considered of higher status than the White Yi, even if the White Yi was wealthier or owned more slaves. The White and Black Yi also lived in separate villages. The Black Yi did not farm, which was traditionally done by White Yi and slaves. Black Yi were responsible only for administration and military activities. The White Yi were not technically slaves but lived as indentured servants to the Black Yi. The Ajia made up 33 per cent of the population. They were owned by both the Black and White Yi and worked as indentured laborers lower than the White Yi. The Xiaxi were the lowest caste. They were slaves who lived with their owners' livestock and had no rights. They could be beaten, sold, and killed for sport. Membership of all four castes was through patrilineal descent. The prevalence of the slave culture was so great that sometimes children were named after how many slaves they owned. For example: Lurbbu (many slaves), Lurda (strong slaves), Lurshy (commander of slaves), Lurnji (origin of slaves), Lurpo (slave lord), Lurha, (hundred slaves), Jjinu (lots of slaves).

Cases of the caste slavery system's influence could be found as late as the 1980s and early 1990s, when nuohuo clans prevented marriage with qunuo or punished members who did.

I once asked a nuoho friend, a highly educated man completely at home in the Chinese scholarly world, what he would do if his daughter, then about fourteen, were to want to marry a quho. He said he would oppose it. I asked him if this were not an old-fashioned attitude. He admitted that it was, but gave two explanations. First, he said, he just wouldn't feel right inside. More important, other nuoho might boycott his family for marrying out, and they would thenceforth have trouble marrying within the nuoho caste. This had happened to some of his affinal relatives in another county.
It is important to point out at the same time, however, that caste stratification in Liangshan has never, as far as I can tell, included notions of pollution or automatic deference, which are so important in the Indian caste system. In areas where there are both nuoho and quho, they socialize freely with one another, eating at each other's houses and often becoming close friends. None of this, however, breaks down the marriage barrier; only among highly educated urbanites is intermarriage ever considered, and then it is usually decided against; most nuoho would rather have their daughters marry a Hxiemga (Han Chinese) than a quho.

— Stevan Harrell

=== Folklore ===
The most famous hero in Yi mythology is Zhyge Alu. He was the son of a dragon and an eagle who possessed supernatural strength, anti-magic, and anti-ghost powers. He rode a nine-winged flying horse called "long heavenly wings." He also had the help of a magical peacock and python. The magical peacock was called Shuotnyie Voplie and could deafen the ears of those who heard its cry, but if invited into one's house, would consume evil and expel leprosy. The python, called Bbahxa Ayuosse, was defeated by Zhyge Alu, who wrestled with it in the ocean after transforming into a dragon. It was said to be able to detect leprosy, cure tuberculosis, and eradicate epidemics. Like the Chinese mythological archer, Hou Yi, Zhyge Alu shoots down the suns to save the people. In the Yi religion Bimoism, Zhyge Alu aids the bimo priests in curing leprosy and fighting ghosts.

Jiegujienuo was a ghost that caused dizziness, slowness in action, dementia and anxiety. The ghost was blamed for ailments and exorcism rituals were conducted to combat the ghost. The bimo erected small sticks considered to be sacred, the kiemobbur, at the ritual site in preparation.

=== Torch Festival ===
The Torch Festival is one of the Yi people's main holidays. According to Yi legend, there were once two men of great strength, Sireabi and Atilaba. Sireabi lived in heaven while Atilaba on earth. When Sireabi heard of Atilaba's strength, he challenged Atilaba to a wrestling match. After suffering two defeats, Sireabi was killed in a bout, which greatly angered the bodhisattavas, who sent a plague of locusts to punish the earth. On the 24th day of the 6th month of the lunar calendar, Atilaba cut down many pine trees and used them as torches to kill the locusts, protecting the crops from destruction. The Torch Festival is thus held in his honor.

=== Music ===
The Yi play a number of traditional musical instruments, including large plucked and bowed string instruments, as well as wind instruments called bawu (巴乌) and mabu (马布). The Yi also play the hulu sheng, though unlike other minority groups in Yunnan, the Yi do not play the hulu sheng for courtship or love songs (aiqing). The kouxian, a small four-pronged instrument similar to the Jew's harp, is another commonly found instrument among the Liangshan Yi. Kouxian songs are most often improvised and are supposed to reflect the mood of the player or the surrounding environment. Kouxian songs can also occasionally function in the aiqing form. Yi dance is perhaps the most commonly recognized form of musical performance, as it is often performed during publicly sponsored holidays and/or festival events.

=== Literature ===
Artist Colette Fu, great-granddaughter of Long Yun has spent time from 1996 till present photographing the Yi community in Yunnan Province. Her series of pop-up books, titled We are Tiger Dragon People, includes images of many Yi groups.

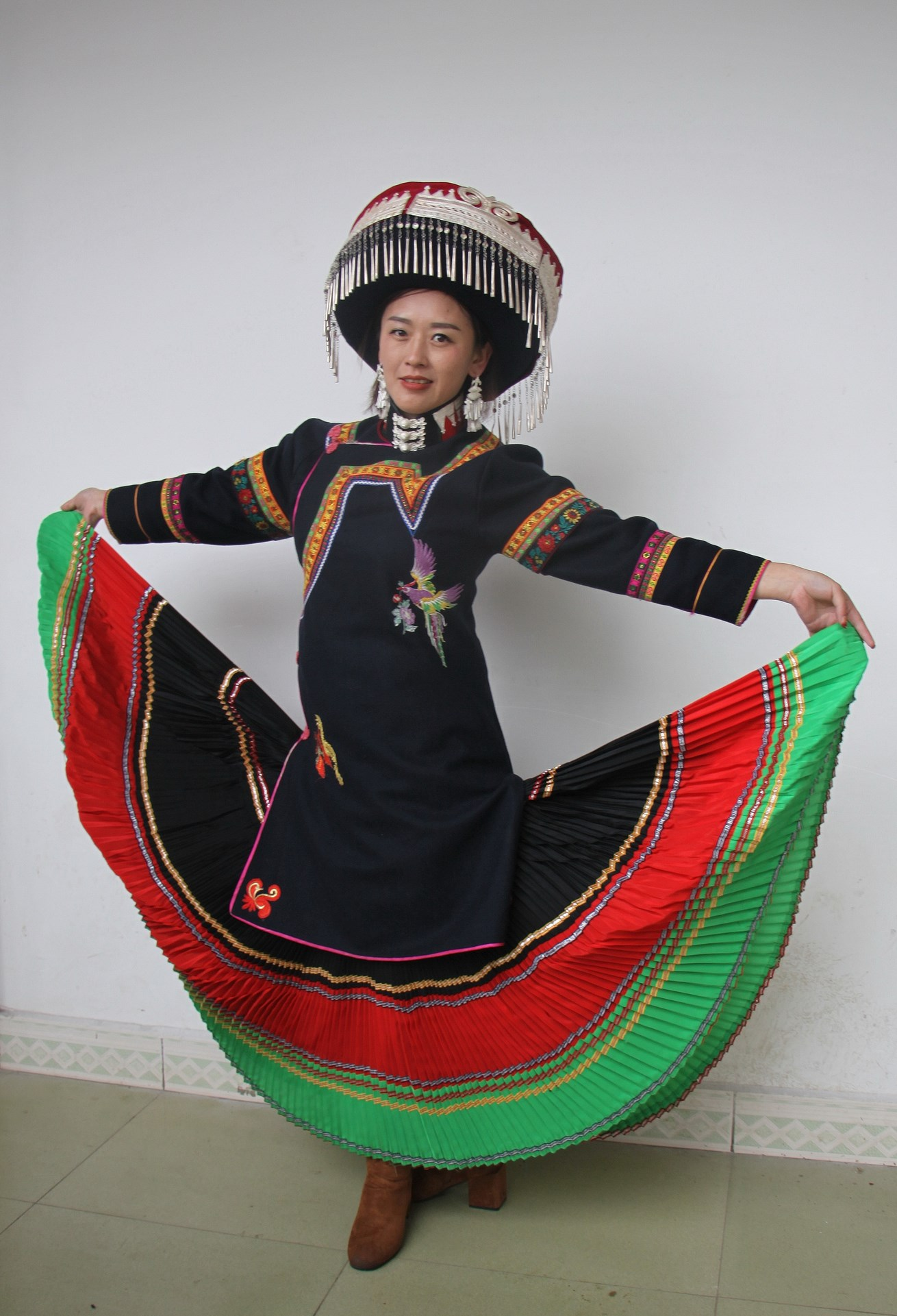
Yi woman in traditional dress

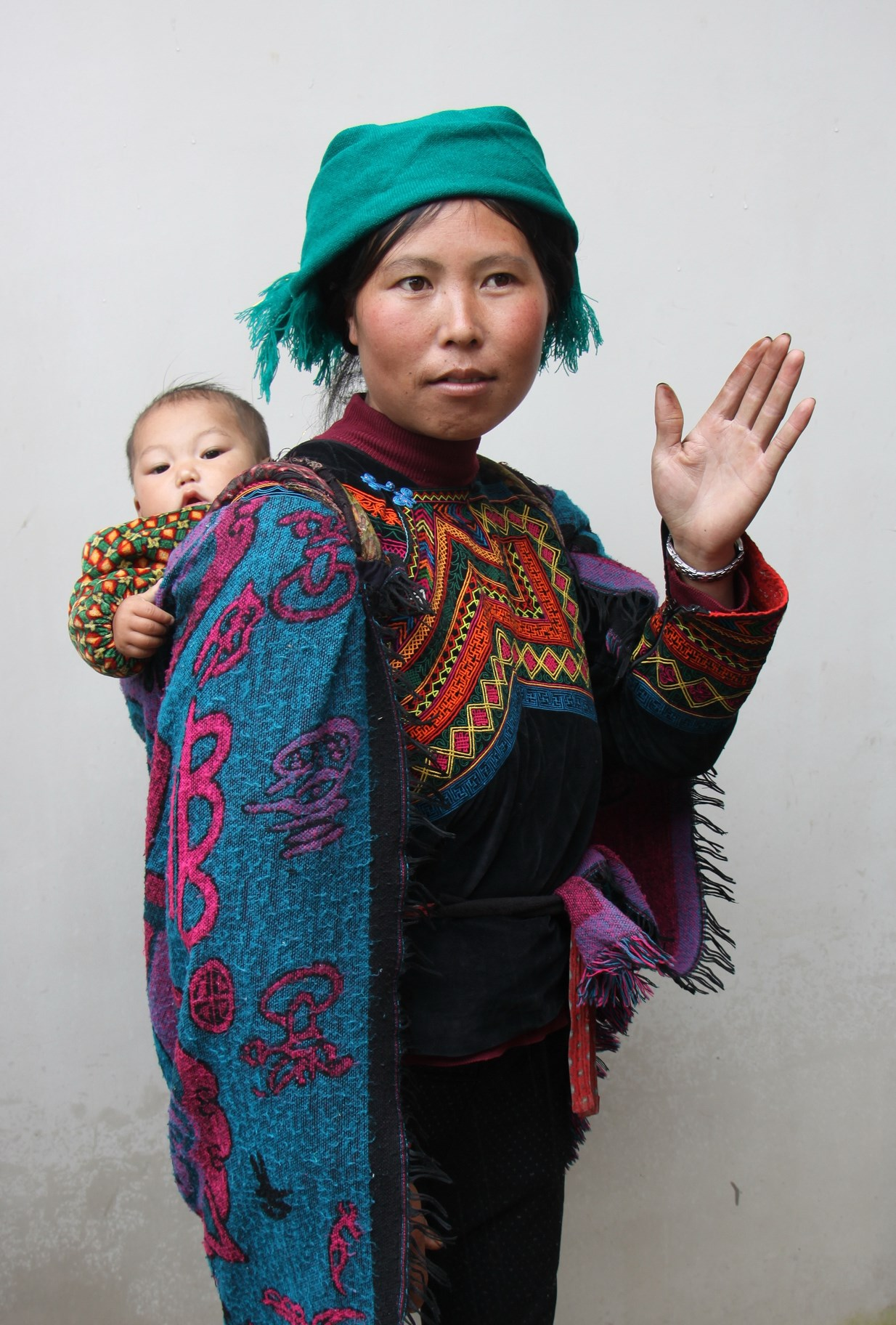
Yi woman in traditional dress with a child

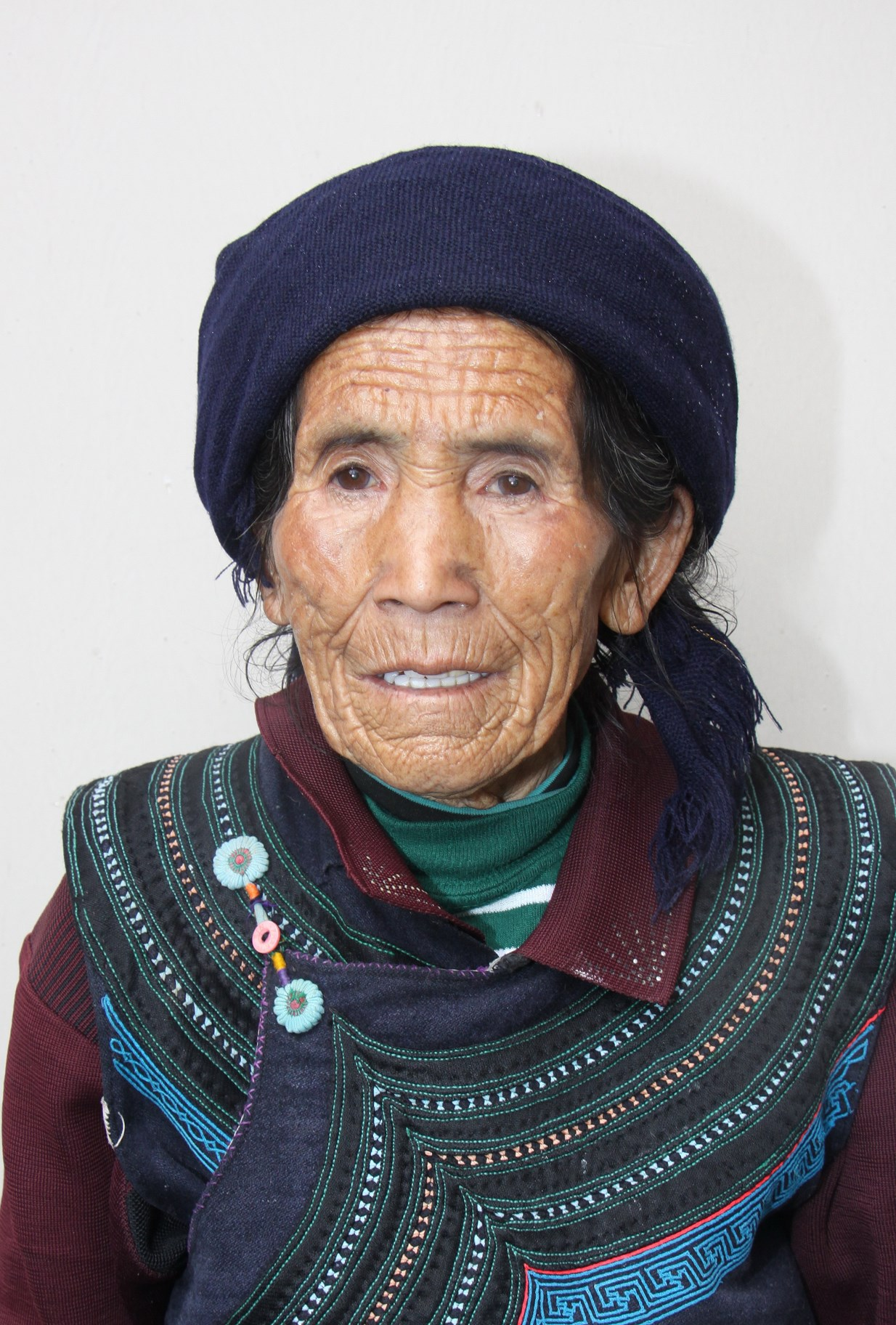
Yi woman in traditional dress

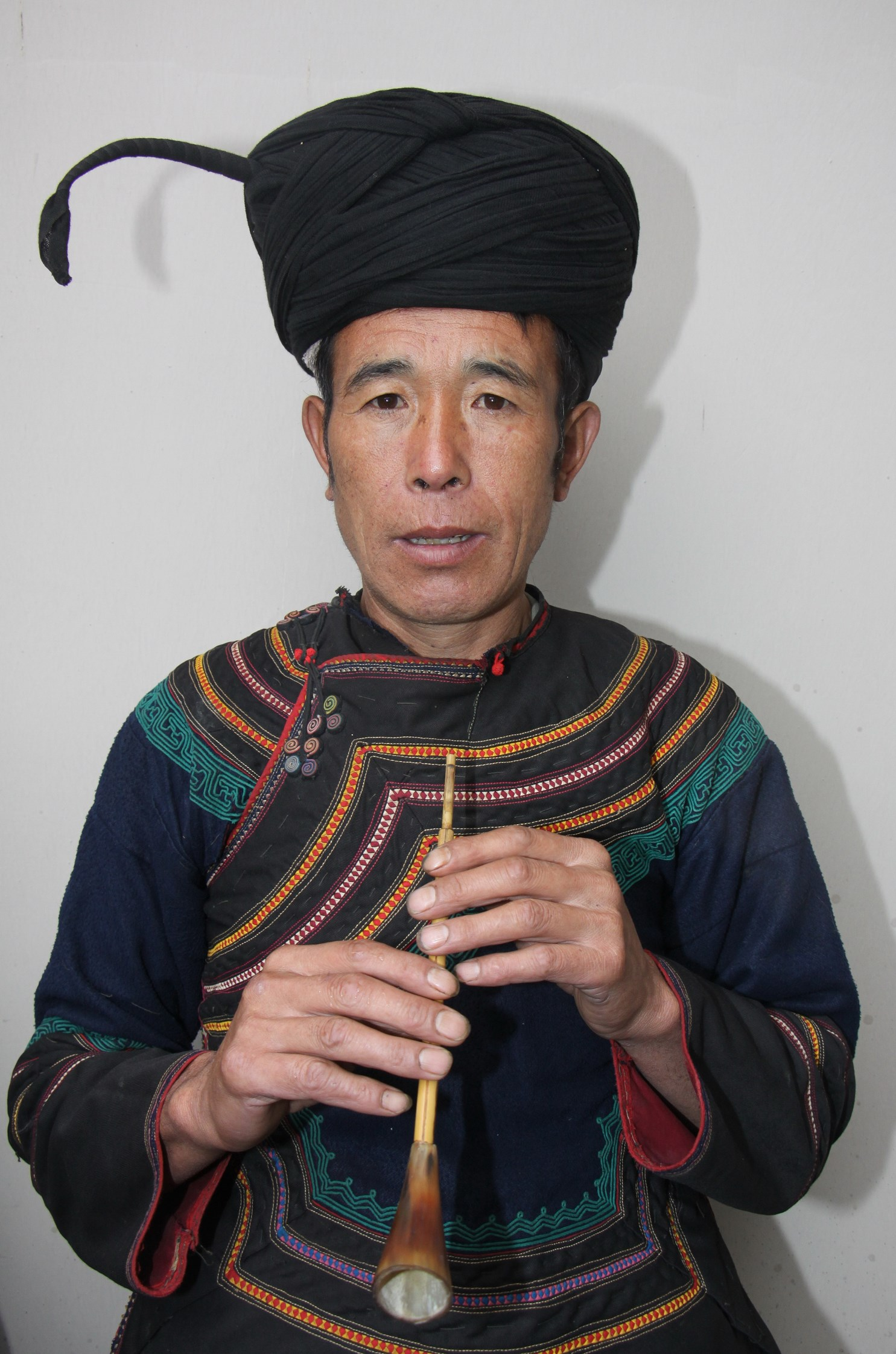
Yi man in traditional dress

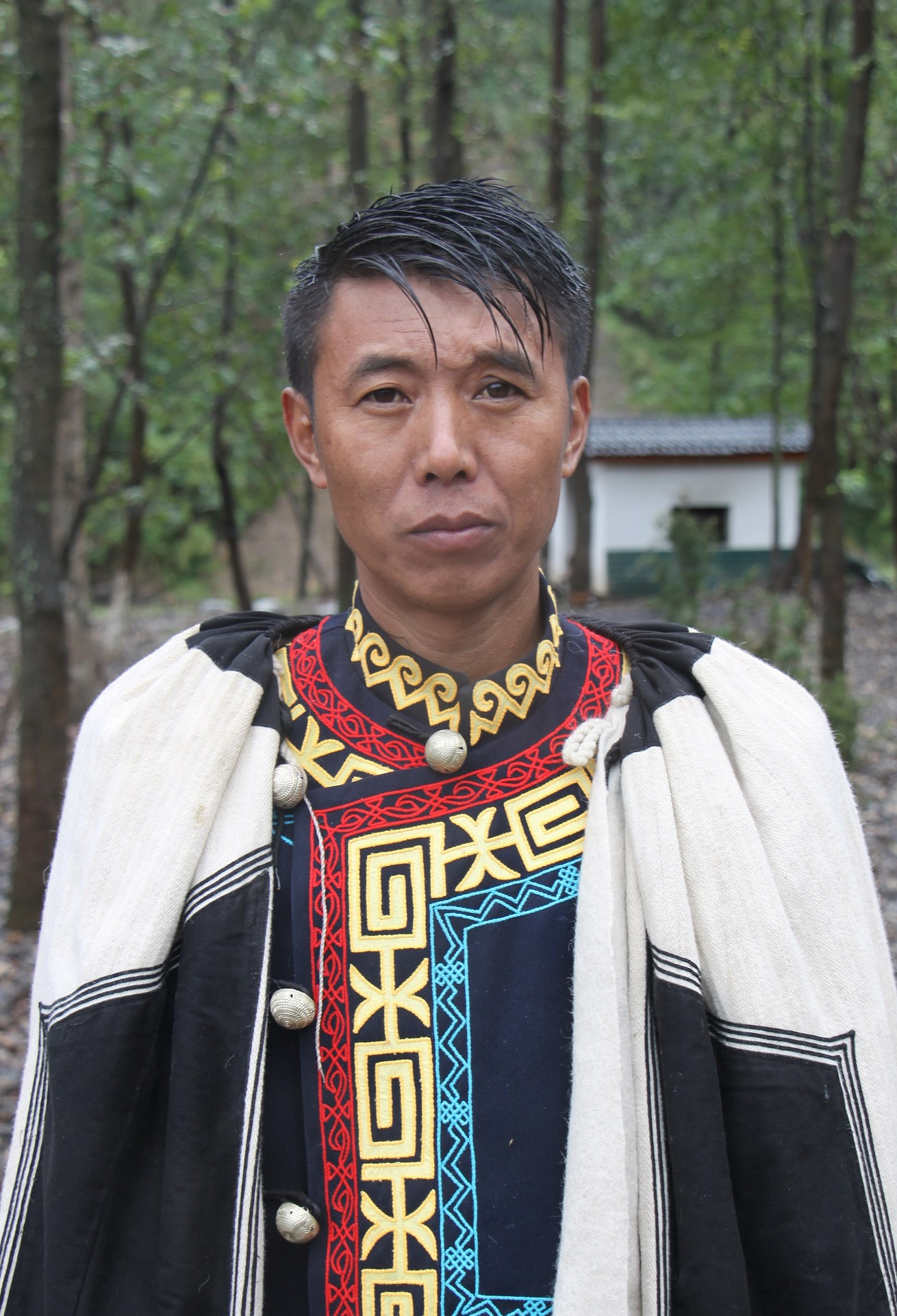
Yi man in traditional dress

== Religion ==
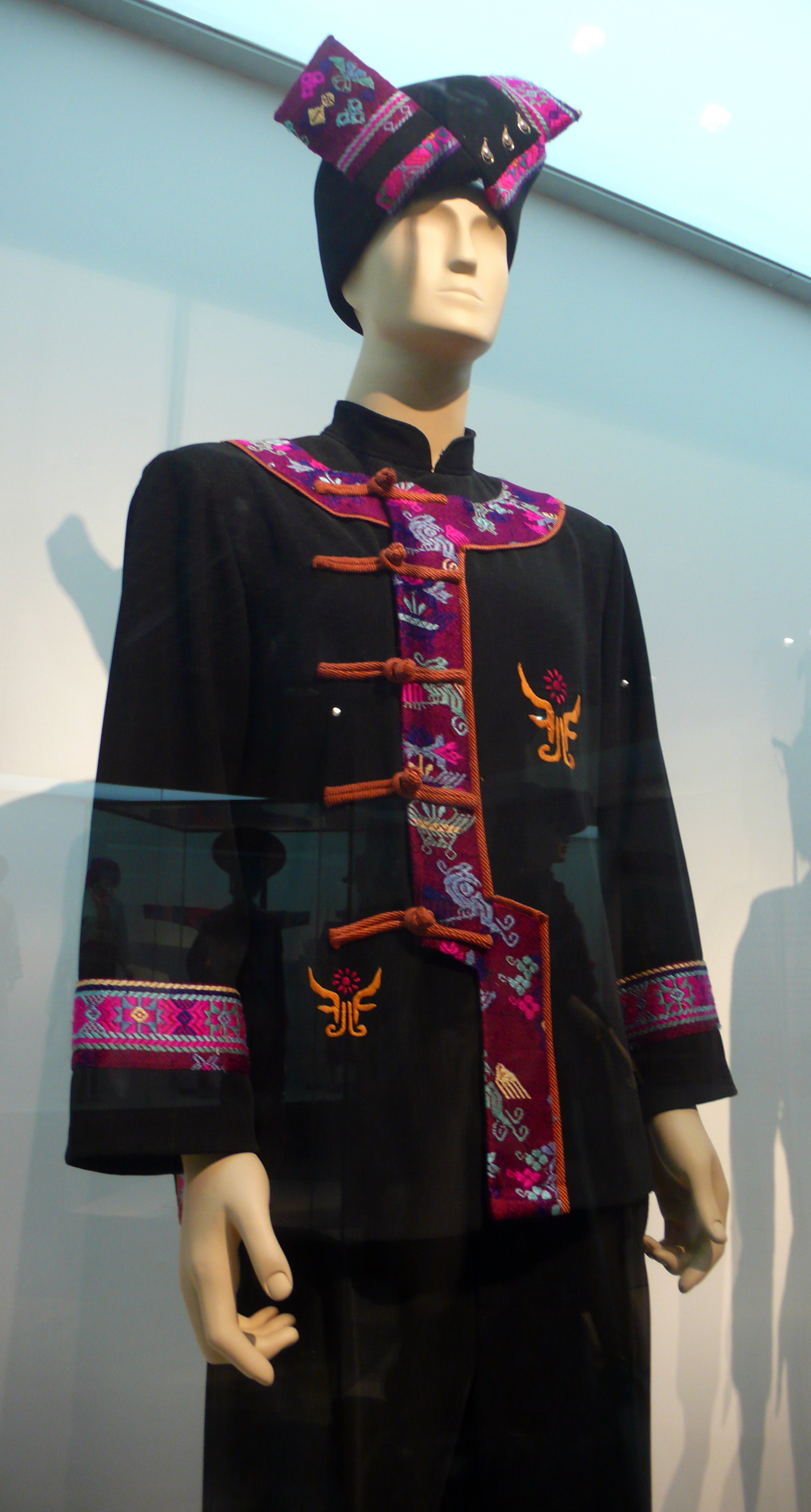
Yi clothing (male)

=== Bimoism ===
A symbol used to represent the Bimoist faith

Bimoism (Chinese: 毕摩教; pinyin: Bìmójiào, Yi: ꀘꂾ bi mox) is the indigenous religion of the Yi people, the largest ethnic group in Yunnan after the Han Chinese. It takes its name from the bimo, shaman-priests who are also masters of Yi language and scriptures, wearing distinctive black robes and large hats.

=== Other religions ===
In Yunnan, some of the Yi have adopted Buddhism as a result of exchanges with other predominantly Buddhist ethnic groups present in Yunnan, such as the Dai and the Tibetans. The most important god of Yi Buddhism is Mahākāla, a wrathful deity found in Vajrayana and Tibetan Buddhism. In the 20th century, many Yi people in China converted to Christianity, after the arrival of Gladstone Porteous in 1904 and, later, medical missionaries such as Alfred James Broomhall, Janet Broomhall, Ruth Dix and Joan Wales of the China Inland Mission. According to missionary organization OMF International, the exact number of Yi Christians is not known. In 1991 it was reported that there were as many as 1,500,000 Yi Christians in Yunnan Province, especially in Luquan County where there are more than 20 churches.

== Medicine ==
The Yi are known for the extent of their inter-generational transmission of traditional medicine through oral tradition and written records. Their traditional medicine system has been academically inventoried. Since the prefecture the Yi medicinal data was collected from also contains the cave containing human-infectable SARS clades and it is known that people living in the vicinity SARS caves show serological signs of past infection, it has been suggested that the Yi were repeatably exposed to coronavirus over their history, passively learned to medicinally fend off coronavirus infection centuries ago, and committed the results into their inter-generational record of medicinal indications.

== Distribution ==
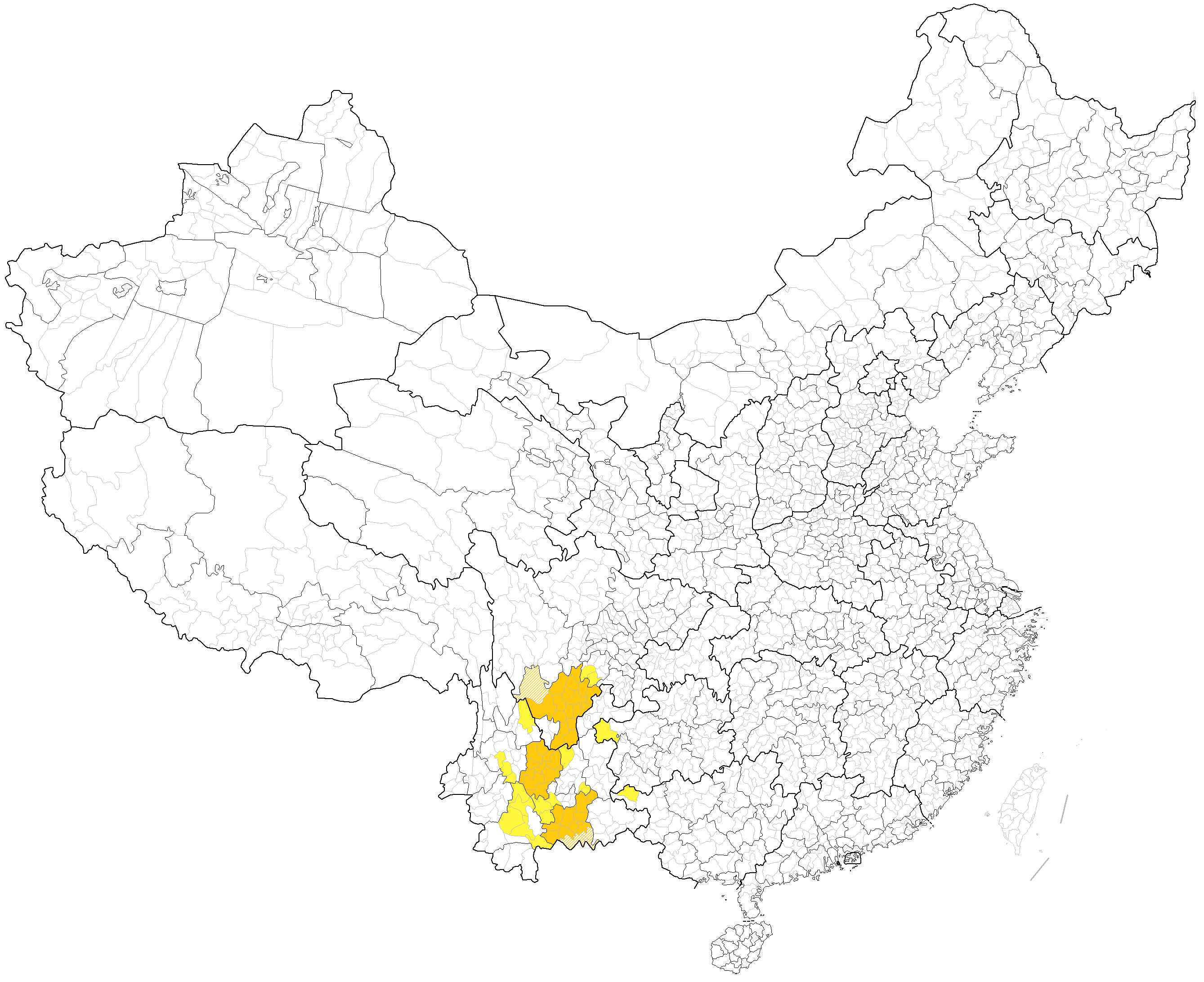
Yi autonomous prefectures and counties in China

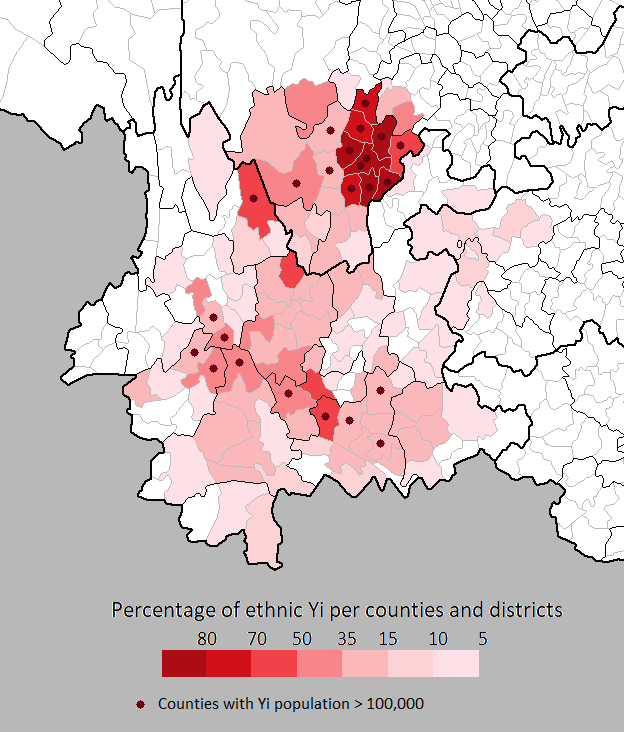
Yi population by counties

The Census of 2020 recorded 9,830,327 Yi in China.

Provincial Distribution of the Yi, from the 2020 census

| Province-level division | Yi Population | % of China's Yi Population |
|---|---|---|
| Yunnan Province | 5,071,002 | 51.6% |
| Sichuan Province | 3,191,470 | 32.5% |
| Guizhou Province | 959,302 | 9.8% |
| Zhejiang Province | 155,681 | 1.6% |
| Guangdong Province | 141,942 | 1.4% |
| Fujian Province | 53,930 | 0.5% |
| Jiangsu Province | 47,316 | 0.5% |
| Shanghai Municipality | 21,952 | 0.2% |
| Other | 187,732 | 1.9% |

County-level distribution of the Yi 2000 census in China.

(Only includes counties or county-equivalents containing >1% of county population.)

| County/city | Yi % | Yi population | Total population |
|---|---|---|---|
| Sichuan province | 2.58 | 2,122,389 | 82,348,296 |
| Panzhihua city | 10.11 | 110,326 | 1,091,657 |
| Dong district | 1.25 | 3,945 | 315,707 |
| Xi district | 1.84 | 3,148 | 170,862 |
| Renhe district | 19.06 | 38,907 | 204,170 |
| Miyi county | 13.21 | 27,381 | 207,300 |
| Yanbian county | 19.08 | 36,945 | 193,618 |
| Leshan city | 3.53 | 117,355 | 3,324,139 |
| Jinkouhe district | 10.15 | 5,373 | 52,916 |
| Ebian Yi autonomous county | 30.65 | 43,269 | 141,166 |
| Mabian Yi autonomous county | 39.15 | 66,723 | 170,425 |
| Pingshan county | 2.00 | 5,004 | 250,620 |
| Yaan city | 2.04 | 31,013 | 1,522,845 |
| Hanyuan county | 4.51 | 15,686 | 347,471 |
| Shimian county | 11.17 | 13,769 | 123,261 |
| Garze Tibetan autonomous prefecture | 2.56 | 22,946 | 897,239 |
| Luding county | 4.40 | 3,424 | 77,855 |
| Jiulong county | 37.01 | 18,806 | 50,816 |
| Liangshan Yi autonomous prefecture | 44.43 | 1,813,683 | 4,081,697 |
| Xichang city | 16.48 | 101,369 | 615,212 |
| Muli Tibetan autonomous county | 27.71 | 34,489 | 124,462 |
| Yanyuan county | 47.67 | 149,568 | 313,765 |
| Dechang county | 23.18 | 43,810 | 188,980 |
| Huili county | 17.33 | 75,064 | 433,185 |
| Huidong county | 6.91 | 24,279 | 351,310 |
| Ningnan county | 21.85 | 37,134 | 169,962 |
| Puge county | 76.55 | 106,521 | 139,156 |
| Butuo county | 95.44 | 132,285 | 138,604 |
| Jinyang county | 78.42 | 109,813 | 140,028 |
| Zhaojue county | 96.75 | 200,951 | 207,712 |
| Xide county | 85.74 | 118,048 | 137,676 |
| Mianning county | 33.39 | 108,289 | 324,332 |
| Yuexi county | 72.54 | 172,505 | 237,800 |
| Ganluo county | 68.66 | 120,445 | 175,426 |
| Meigu county | 97.81 | 172,356 | 176,214 |
| Leibo county | 51.36 | 106,757 | 207,873 |
| Guizhou province | 2.39 | 843,554 | 35,247,695 |
| Baiyun district | 1.04 | 1,961 | 187,695 |
| Qingzhen city | 1.65 | 7,761 | 471,305 |
| Liupanshui city | 9.56 | 262,308 | 2,744,085 |
| Zhongshan district | 5.64 | 25,549 | 453,293 |
| Liuzhi special district | 11.32 | 61,319 | 541,762 |
| Shuicheng county | 11.70 | 79,339 | 678,228 |
| Pan county | 8.97 | 96,101 | 1,070,802 |
| Qianxi'nan Bouyei Miao autonomous prefecture | 2.05 | 58,766 | 2,864,920 |
| Xingyi city | 2.02 | 14,521 | 719,605 |
| Xingren county | 2.44 | 10,372 | 425,091 |
| Puan county | 2.66 | 6,905 | 259,881 |
| Qinglong county | 6.76 | 17,436 | 258,031 |
| Anlong county | 2.28 | 9,094 | 399,384 |
| Bijie prefecture | 7.41 | 468,800 | 6,327,471 |
| Bijie city | 4.26 | 48,094 | 1,128,230 |
| Dafang county | 10.84 | 92,295 | 851,729 |
| Qianxi county | 8.67 | 60,420 | 697,075 |
| Jinsha county | 4.17 | 20,696 | 496,063 |
| Zhijin county | 3.81 | 31,420 | 825,350 |
| Nayong county | 5.72 | 37,840 | 661,772 |
| Weining Yi Hui Miao autonomous county | 9.06 | 95,629 | 1,056,009 |
| Hezhang county | 13.48 | 82,406 | 611,243 |
| Yunnan province | 11.11 | 4,705,658 | 42,360,089 |
| Kunming city | 6.65 | 384,531 | 5,781,294 |
| Wuhua district | 2.56 | 10,580 | 413,420 |
| Panlong district | 1.59 | 5,468 | 344,754 |
| Guandu district | 3.38 | 47,311 | 1,398,305 |
| Xishan district | 5.07 | 30,617 | 603,363 |
| Dongchuan district | 3.26 | 8,984 | 275,564 |
| Chenggong county | 1.22 | 2,202 | 180,685 |
| Jinning county | 7.64 | 20,443 | 267,739 |
| Fumin county | 7.44 | 10,422 | 140,046 |
| Yiliang county | 6.06 | 24,051 | 396,677 |
| Shilin Yi autonomous county | 32.49 | 72,779 | 223,978 |
| Luquan Yi Miao autonomous county | 22.45 | 96,388 | 429,355 |
| Xundian Hui Yi autonomous county | 8.91 | 42,934 | 481,721 |
| Anning city | 3.34 | 9,872 | 295,173 |
| Qujing city | 3.85 | 210,351 | 5,466,089 |
| Qilin district | 2.16 | 14,041 | 648,956 |
| Malong county | 3.41 | 6,326 | 185,766 |
| Shizong county | 6.21 | 21,718 | 349,770 |
| Luoping county | 6.44 | 33,159 | 515,211 |
| Fuyuan county | 7.16 | 47,076 | 657,474 |
| Huize county | 2.00 | 16,910 | 844,485 |
| Zhanyi county | 2.16 | 8,406 | 389,838 |
| Xuanwei city | 4.46 | 57,708 | 1,292,825 |
| Yuxi city | 19.32 | 400,412 | 2,073,005 |
| Hongta district | 9.02 | 36,905 | 409,044 |
| Jiangchuan county | 5.48 | 14,087 | 257,078 |
| Chengjiang county | 1.82 | 2,726 | 149,748 |
| Tonghai county | 5.82 | 16,017 | 275,063 |
| Huaning county | 21.29 | 41,844 | 196,519 |
| Yimen county | 26.75 | 45,362 | 169,581 |
| Eshan Yi autonomous county | 52.36 | 79,289 | 151,426 |
| Xinping Yi Dai autonomous county | 46.20 | 122,259 | 264,615 |
| Yuanjiang Hani Yi Dai autonomous county | 20.97 | 41,923 | 199,931 |
| Zhaotong prefecture | 3.23 | 148,521 | 4,592,388 |
| Zhaotong city | 2.58 | 18,758 | 727,959 |
| Ludian county | 2.51 | 8,686 | 345,740 |
| Qiaojia county | 2.86 | 13,183 | 461,034 |
| Daguan county | 1.98 | 4,667 | 235,802 |
| Yongshan county | 4.72 | 17,130 | 362,943 |
| Zhenxiong county | 5.78 | 63,463 | 1,097,093 |
| Yiliang county | 4.24 | 20,269 | 477,811 |
| Chuxiong Yi autonomous prefecture | 26.31 | 668,937 | 2,542,530 |
| Chuxiong city | 19.05 | 95,959 | 503,682 |
| Shuangbai county | 43.10 | 66,110 | 153,403 |
| Mouding county | 22.03 | 43,032 | 195,322 |
| Nanhua county | 36.07 | 82,223 | 227,970 |
| Yaoan county | 25.38 | 50,526 | 199,071 |
| Dayao county | 29.52 | 82,620 | 279,838 |
| Yongren county | 49.44 | 51,223 | 103,606 |
| Yuanmou county | 24.25 | 49,179 | 202,779 |
| Wuding county | 30.18 | 79,254 | 262,601 |
| Lufeng county | 16.61 | 68,811 | 414,258 |
| Honghe Hani Yi autonomous prefecture | 23.57 | 973,732 | 4,130,463 |
| Gejiu city | 20.27 | 91,902 | 453,311 |
| Kaiyuan city | 33.09 | 96,647 | 292,039 |
| Mengzi county | 29.38 | 99,917 | 340,051 |
| Pingbian Miao autonomous county | 18.51 | 27,596 | 149,088 |
| Jianshui county | 29.02 | 149,071 | 513,712 |
| Shiping county | 53.67 | 148,987 | 277,580 |
| Mile county | 30.92 | 153,235 | 495,642 |
| Luxi county | 7.99 | 29,202 | 365,585 |
| Yuanyang county | 24.01 | 87,137 | 362,950 |
| Honghe county | 14.23 | 38,086 | 267,627 |
| Jinping Miao Yao Dai autonomous county | 11.97 | 37,837 | 316,171 |
| Lüchun county | 4.92 | 9,894 | 201,256 |
| Hekou Yao autonomous county | 4.42 | 4,221 | 95,451 |
| Wenshan Zhuang Miao autonomous prefecture | 10.62 | 347,194 | 3,268,553 |
| Wenshan county | 17.28 | 74,255 | 429,639 |
| Yanshan county | 21.11 | 92,356 | 437,508 |
| Xichou county | 3.95 | 9,332 | 236,120 |
| Malipo county | 2.25 | 6,036 | 267,986 |
| Maguan county | 9.16 | 32,056 | 350,002 |
| Qiubei county | 18.05 | 78,327 | 434,009 |
| Guangnan county | 5.84 | 42,675 | 730,376 |
| Funing county | 3.17 | 12,157 | 382,913 |
| Pu'er city | 16.58 | 411,120 | 2,480,346 |
| Simao district | 15.12 | 34,904 | 230,834 |
| Ning'er Hani Yi autonomous county | 19.45 | 36,589 | 188,106 |
| Mojiang Hani autonomous county | 9.23 | 32,812 | 355,364 |
| Jingdong Yi autonomous county | 39.92 | 140,556 | 352,089 |
| Jinggu Dai Yi autonomous county | 20.59 | 59,476 | 288,794 |
| Zhenyuan Yi Hani Lahu autonomous county | 27.28 | 56,119 | 205,709 |
| Jiangcheng Hani Yi autonomous county | 13.47 | 13,503 | 100,243 |
| Menglian Dai Lahu Va autonomous county | 2.40 | 4,999 | 208,593 |
| Lancang Lahu autonomous county | 6.74 | 31,255 | 464,016 |
| Ximeng Va autonomous county | 1.05 | 907 | 86,598 |
| Xishuangbanna Dai autonomous prefecture | 5.61 | 55,772 | 993,397 |
| Jinghong city | 5.56 | 24,673 | 443,672 |
| Menghai county | 2.28 | 7,175 | 314,068 |
| Mengla county | 10.15 | 23,924 | 235,657 |
| Dali Bai autonomous prefecture | 12.94 | 426,634 | 3,296,552 |
| Dali city | 2.95 | 15,385 | 521,169 |
| Yangbi Yi autonomous county | 46.09 | 48,565 | 105,380 |
| Xiangyun county | 7.26 | 31,733 | 437,371 |
| Binchuan county | 6.27 | 20,332 | 324,412 |
| Midu county | 8.35 | 24,791 | 296,860 |
| Nanjian Yi autonomous county | 47.24 | 99,159 | 209,887 |
| Weishan Yi Hui autonomous county | 34.07 | 100,879 | 296,124 |
| Yongping county | 26.56 | 47,391 | 178,438 |
| Yunlong county | 5.45 | 10,739 | 196,978 |
| Eryuan county | 3.00 | 9,443 | 315,003 |
| Jianchuan county | 2.88 | 4,771 | 165,900 |
| Heqing county | 5.40 | 13,446 | 249,030 |
| Baoshan prefecture | 3.23 | 75,877 | 2,348,315 |
| Baoshan city | 4.61 | 39,025 | 846,865 |
| Shidian county | 3.62 | 11,360 | 314,187 |
| Longling county | 1.83 | 4,758 | 260,097 |
| Changning county | 6.04 | 20,123 | 333,241 |
| Lijiang prefecture | 18.68 | 210,431 | 1,126,646 |
| Lijiang Naxi autonomous county | 2.42 | 8,871 | 366,705 |
| Yongsheng county | 12.43 | 46,703 | 375,769 |
| Huaping county | 8.26 | 12,808 | 154,968 |
| Ninglang Yi autonomous county | 61.97 | 142,049 | 229,204 |
| Nujiang Lisu autonomous prefecture | 1.99 | 9,805 | 491,824 |
| Lushui county | 2.28 | 3,915 | 171,974 |
| Lanping Bai Pumi autonomous county | 2.91 | 5,727 | 196,977 |
| Diqing Tibetan autonomous prefecture | 3.29 | 11,616 | 353,518 |
| Zhongdian county | 6.50 | 9,586 | 147,416 |
| Weixi Lisu autonomous county | 1.38 | 2,016 | 146,017 |
| Lincang prefecture | 15.77 | 367,880 | 2,332,570 |
| Lincang county | 5.43 | 15,478 | 285,163 |
| Fengqing county | 27.61 | 117,883 | 426,943 |
| Yun county | 37.96 | 158,099 | 416,507 |
| Yongde county | 8.68 | 29,521 | 339,918 |
| Zhenkang county | 17.19 | 31,334 | 182,258 |
| Shuangjiang Lahu Va Blang Dai autonomous county | 1.57 | 2,605 | 165,982 |
| Gengma Dai Va autonomous county | 3.57 | 11,193 | 313,220 |
| Longlin autonomous county (Guangxi) | 1.03 | 3,563 | 347,462 |

== Notable people ==
- Hailai Ahmu (1993–), singer
- He Jie (1986–), singer
- Wu Jinghua (1931–2007), former Communist Party secretary of Tibet Autonomous Region
- Pearl Fu (1941–), community leader
- Long Zhiyi (1929–2021), former chairman of the Guizhou Provincial Committee of the CPPCC
- Zhang Chong (1900–1980), former vice chairman of the CPPCC
- Zhang Liyin (1989–), singer
- Jike Junyi (1988–), singer
- Long Yun (1884–1962), governor and warlord of Yunnan Province
- Lu Han (1895–1974), general and governor of Yunnan Province
- Xiao Yedan (1894–1942), Yi clan leader
- Yang Likun (1941–2000), actress
- Li Qi (1960–1979), soldier
- Cheng Li-wun (1969–), Chairperson of the Kuomintang

== Gallery ==
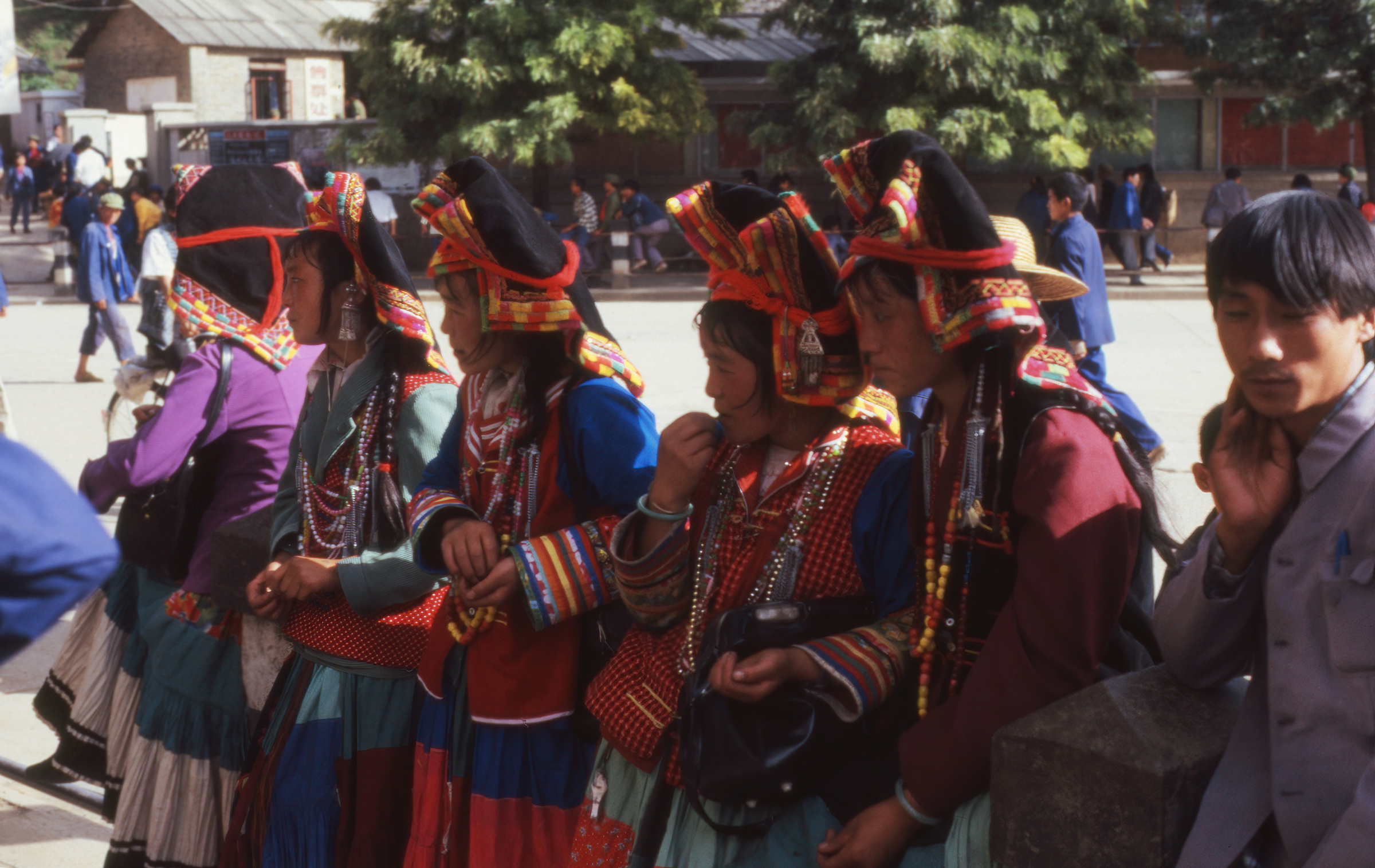
Yi girls in Lijiang (1989)

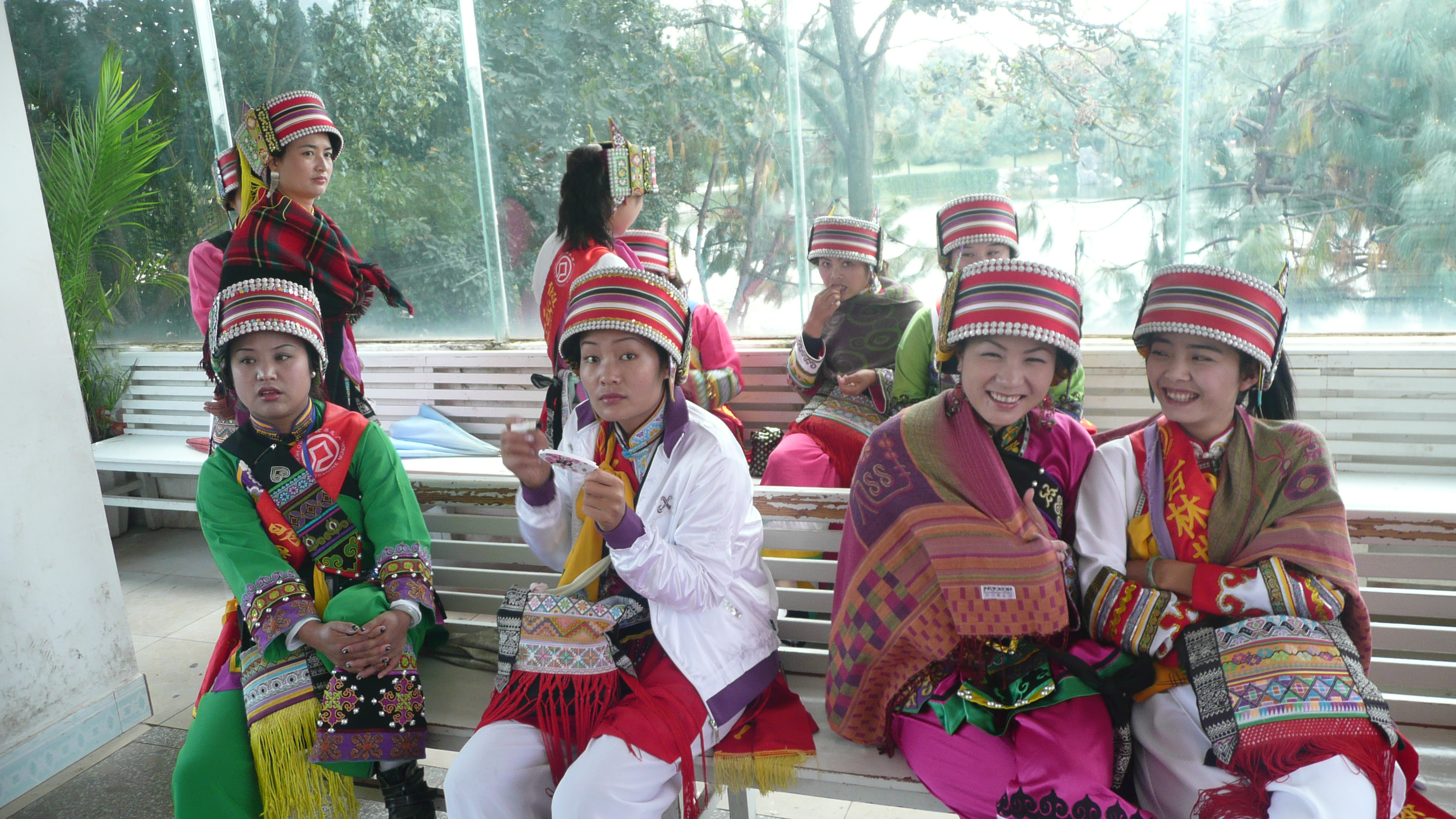
Yi people in Shilin County, Yunnan Province

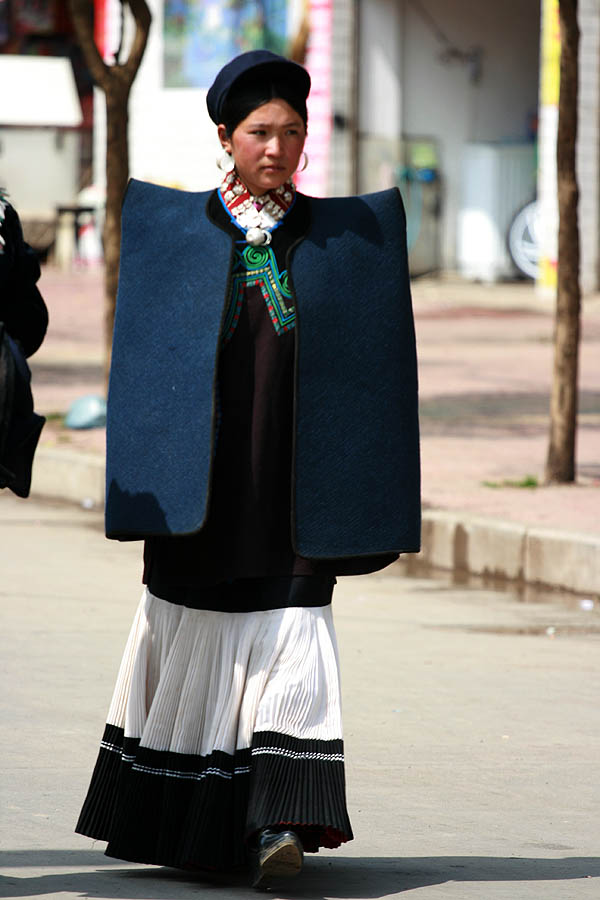
Yi woman, Butuo County, Sichuan Province

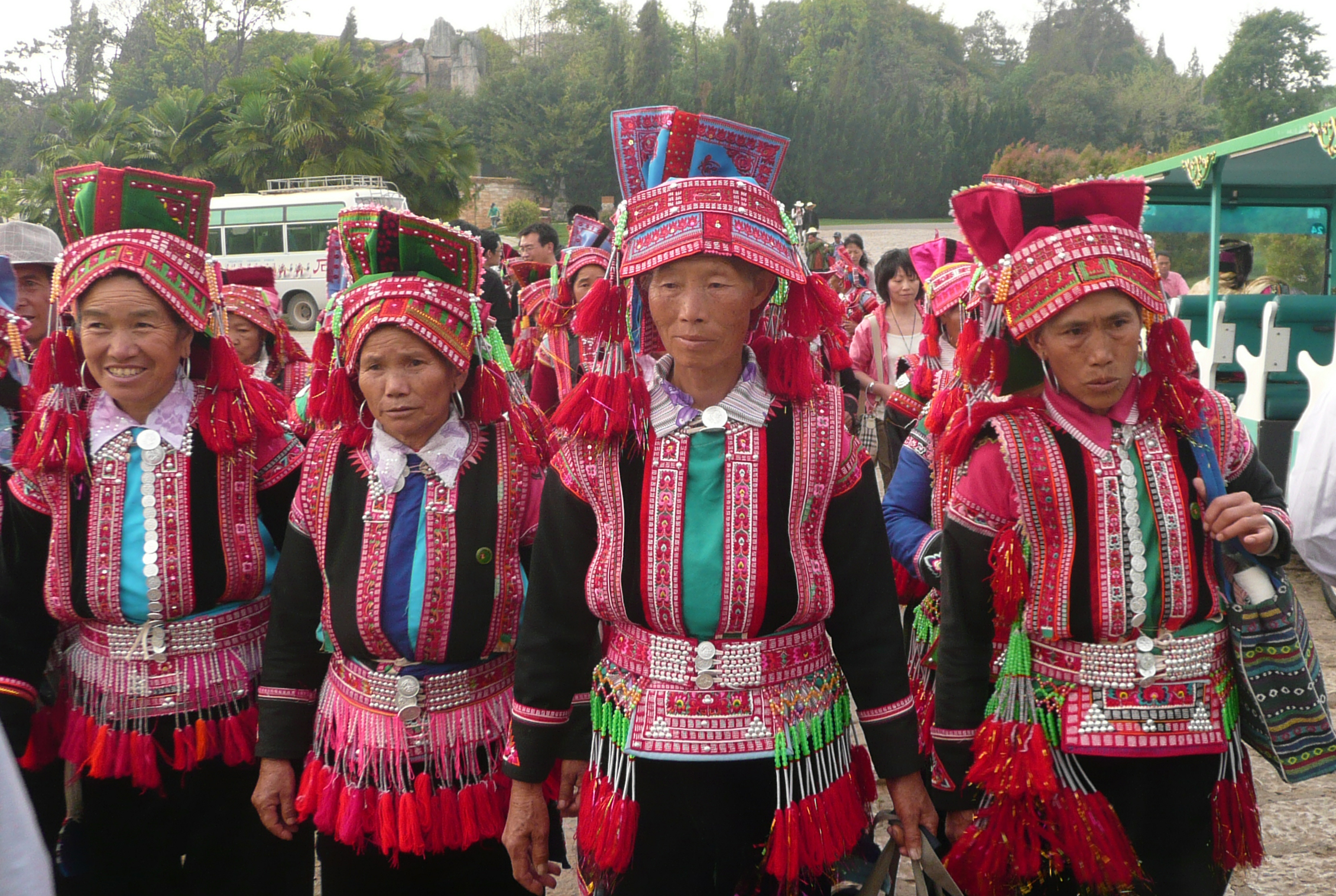
Huayao Yi women, Shiping County, Yunan Province

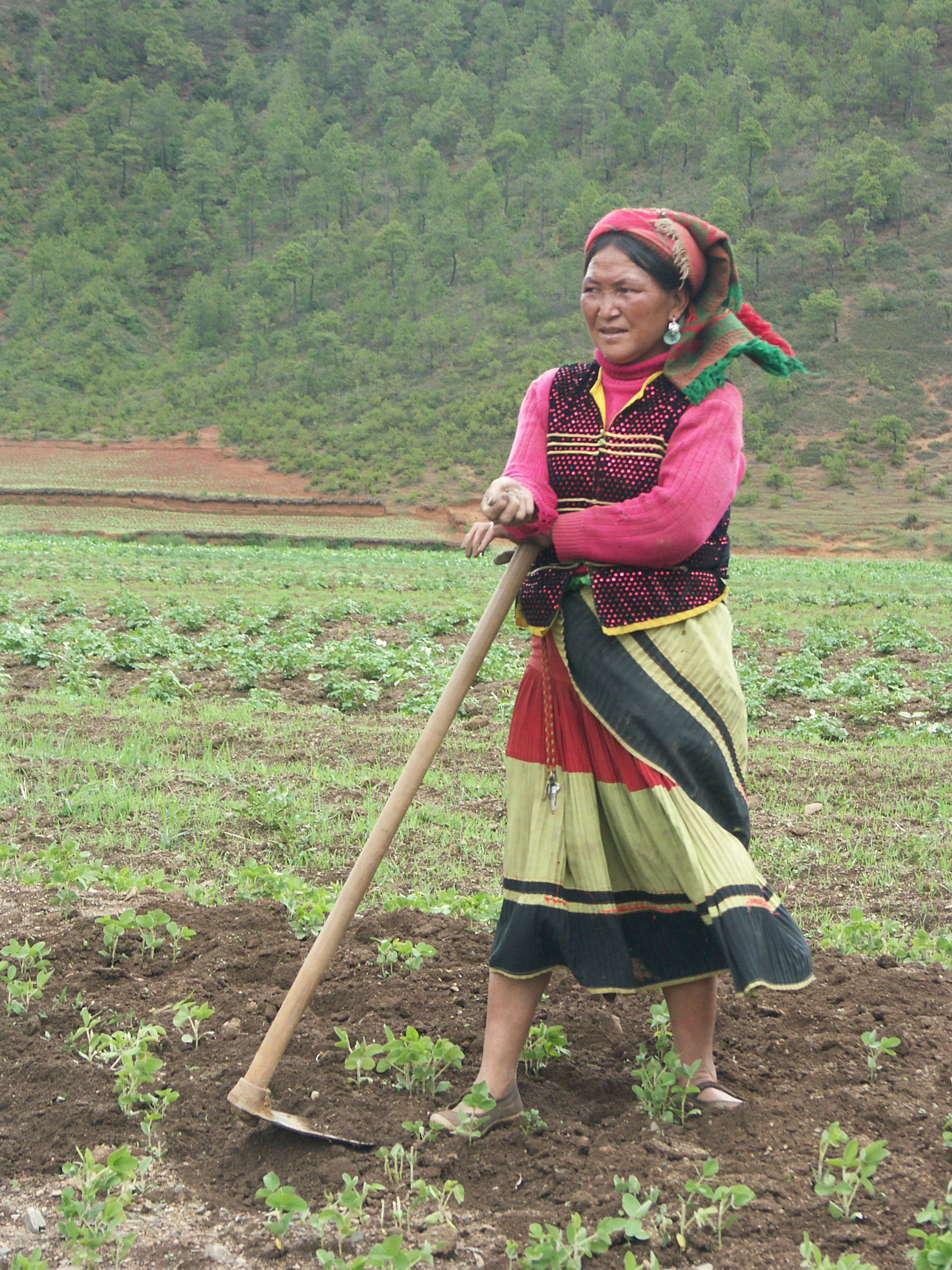
Yí woman near Lugu Lake

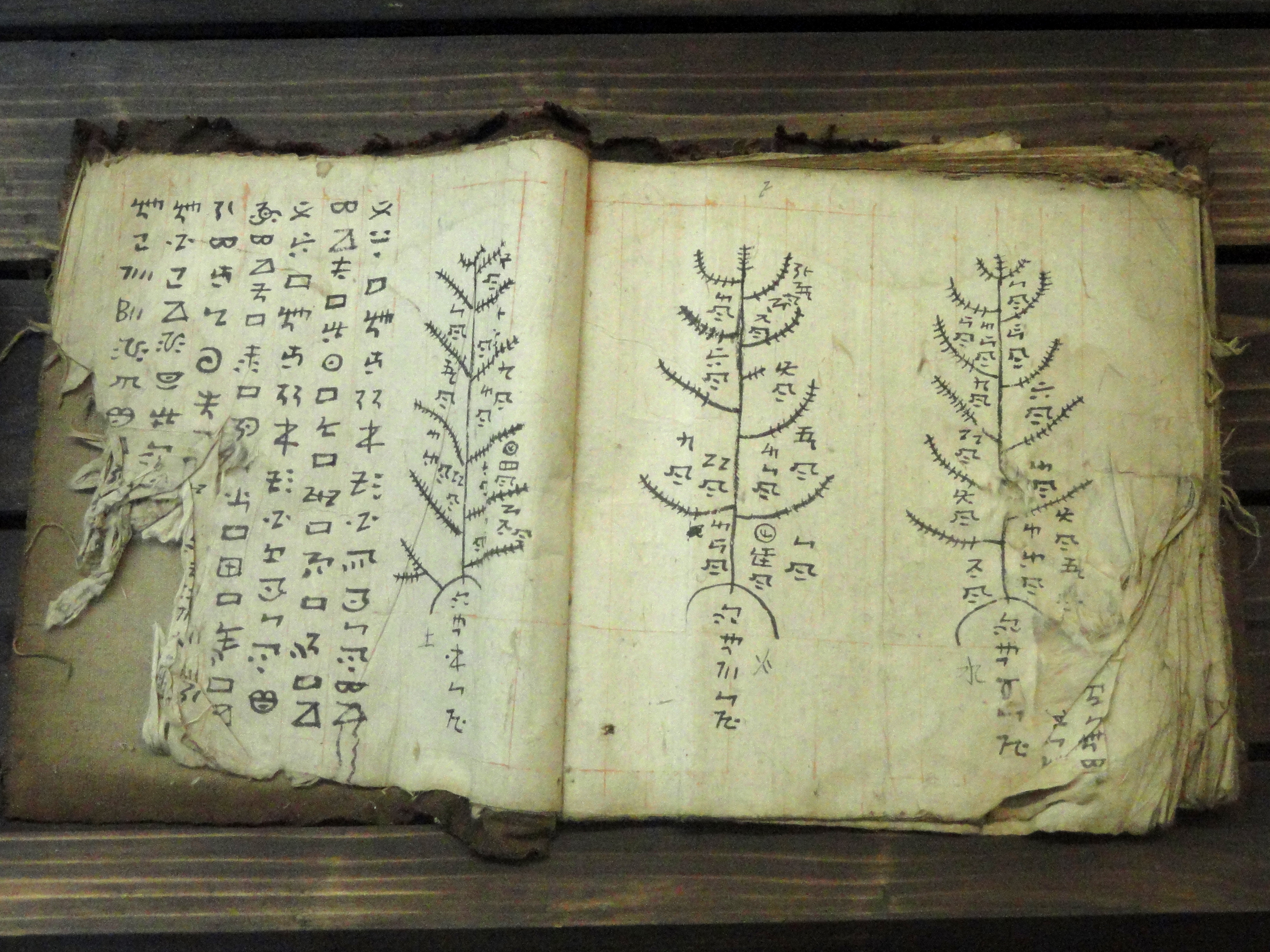
A family tree document in Yi script

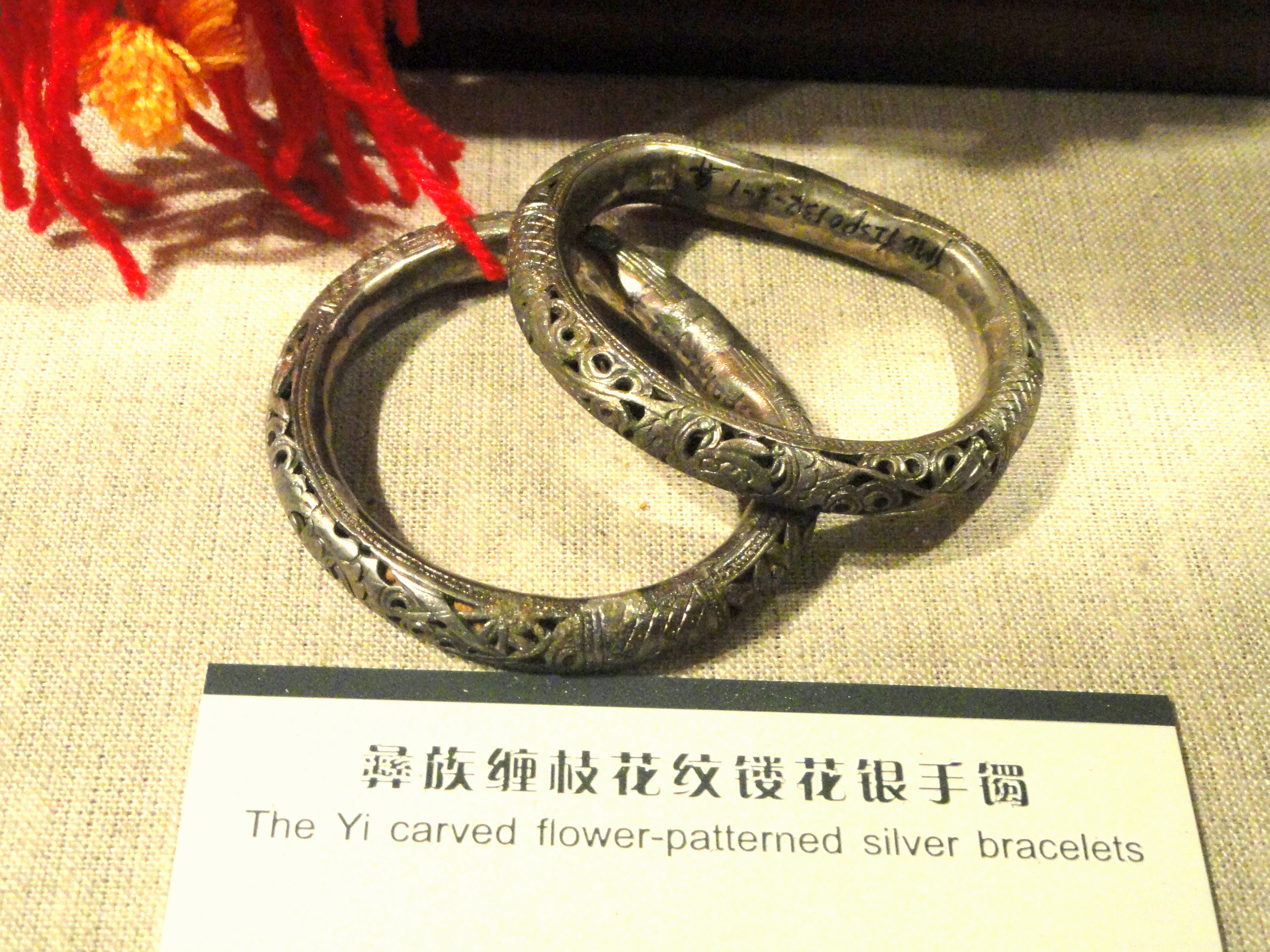
A Yi bracelet, Central Yunnan

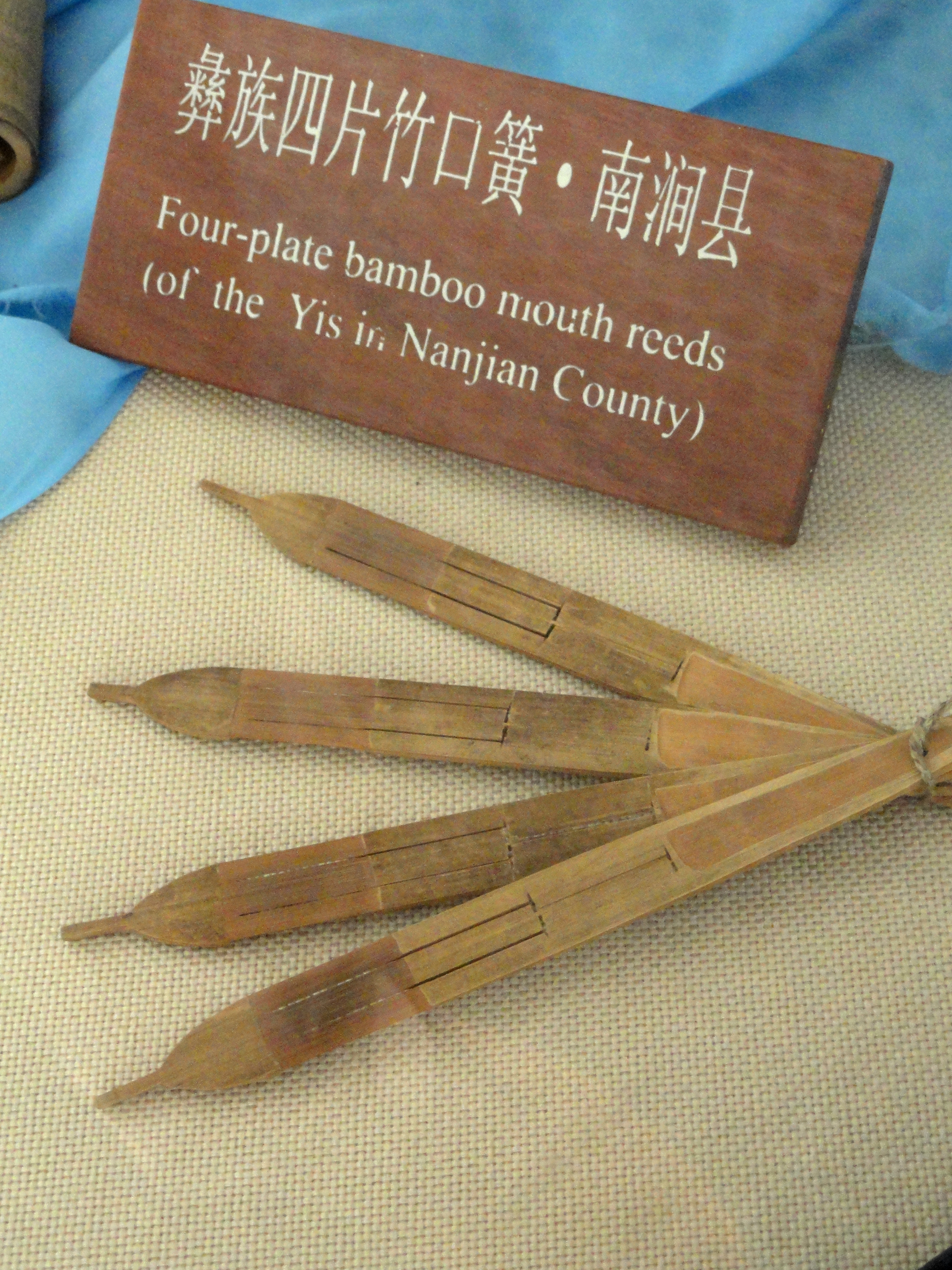
Yi musical instrument: bamboo harmonica

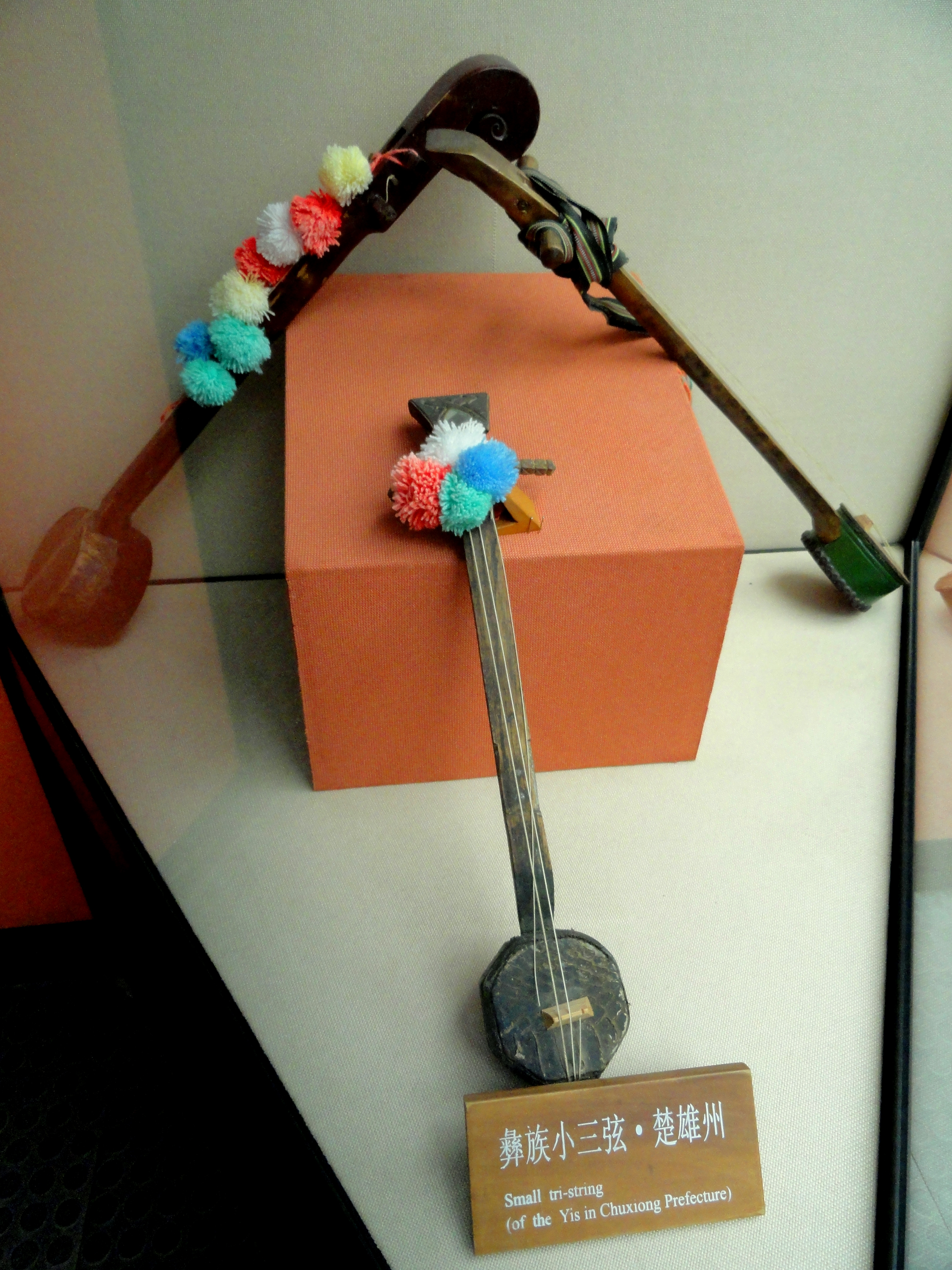
Yi musical instrument: three-strings

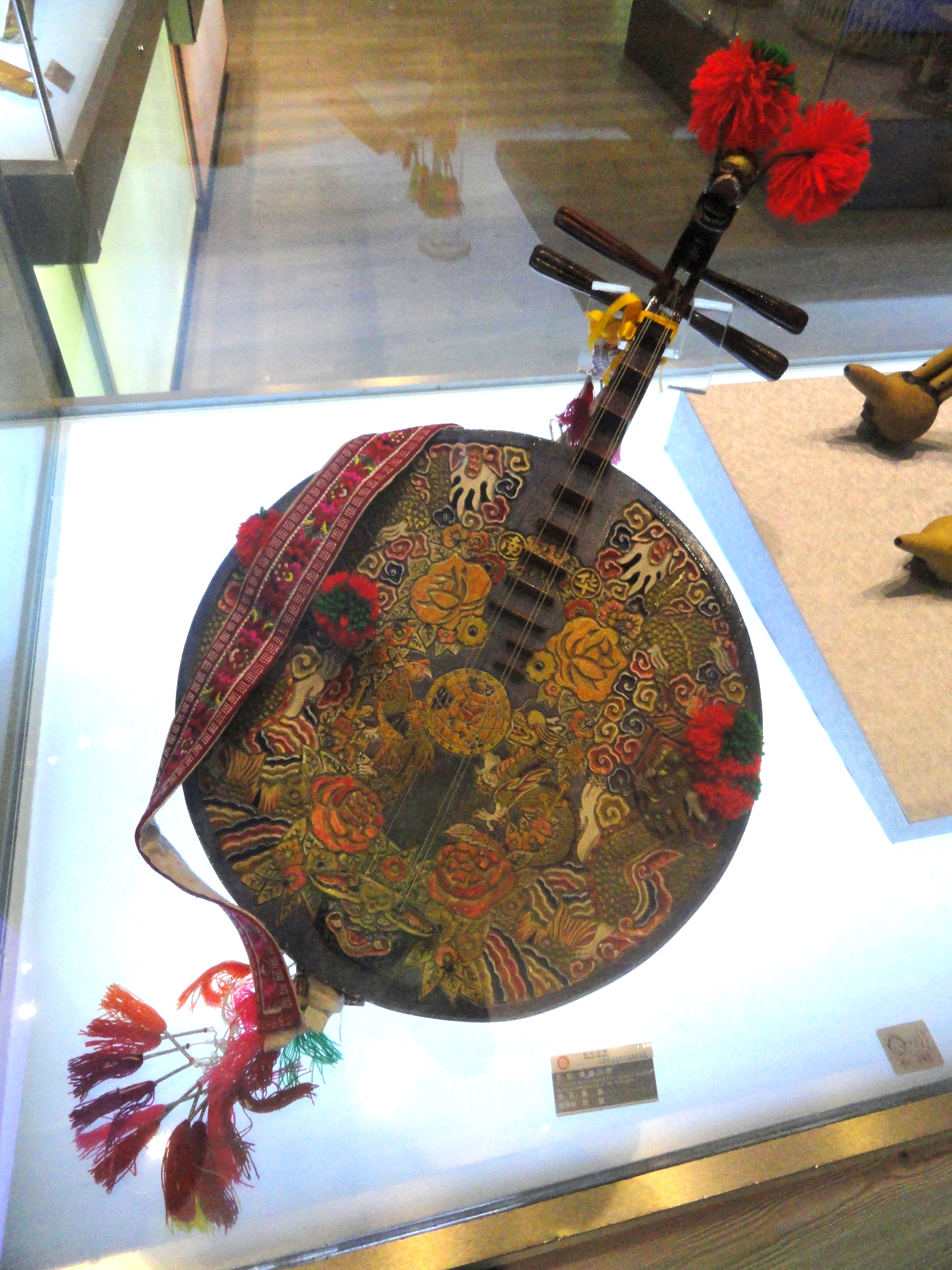
Yi musical instrument: phambe

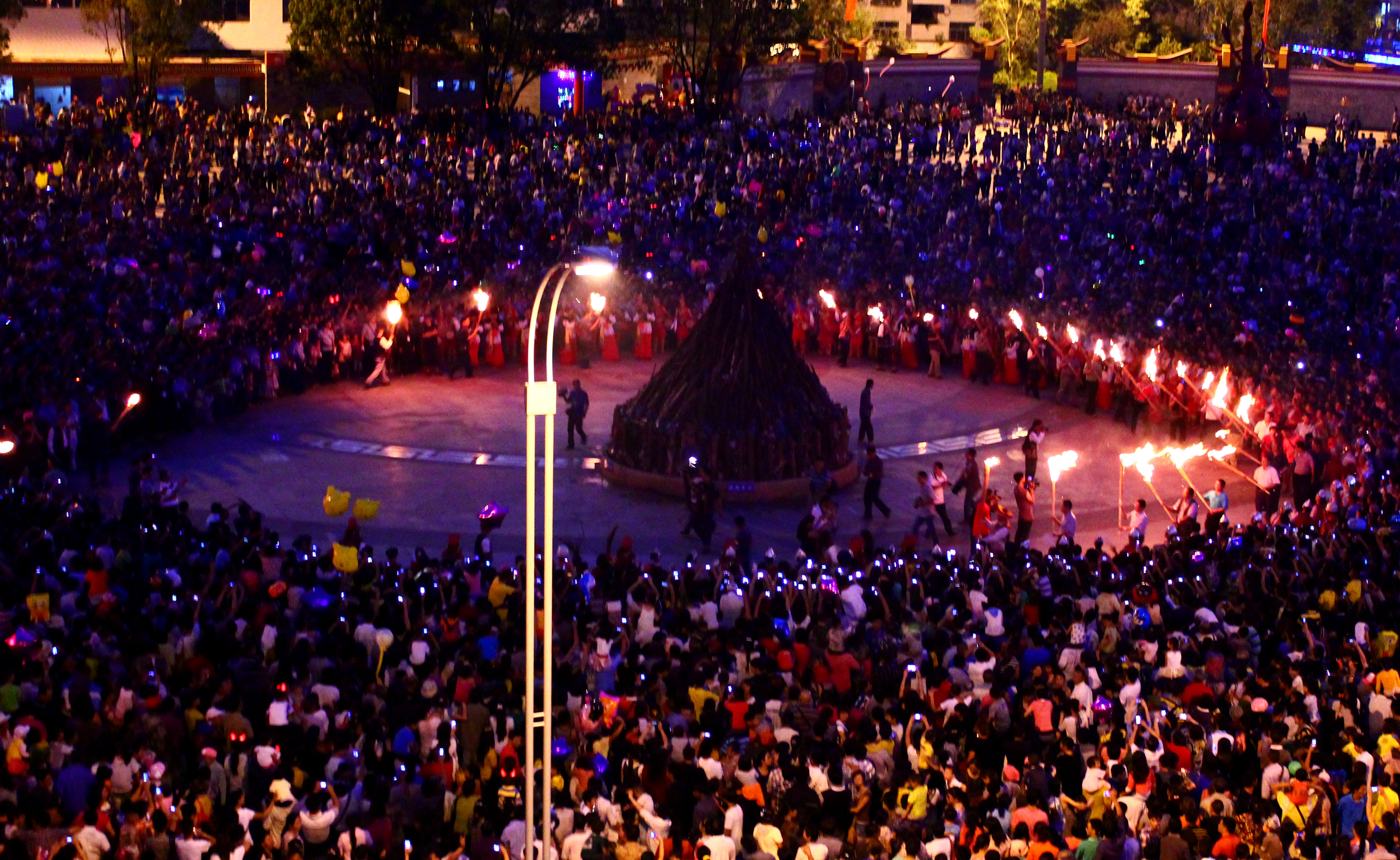
Fire Festival, Eshan County

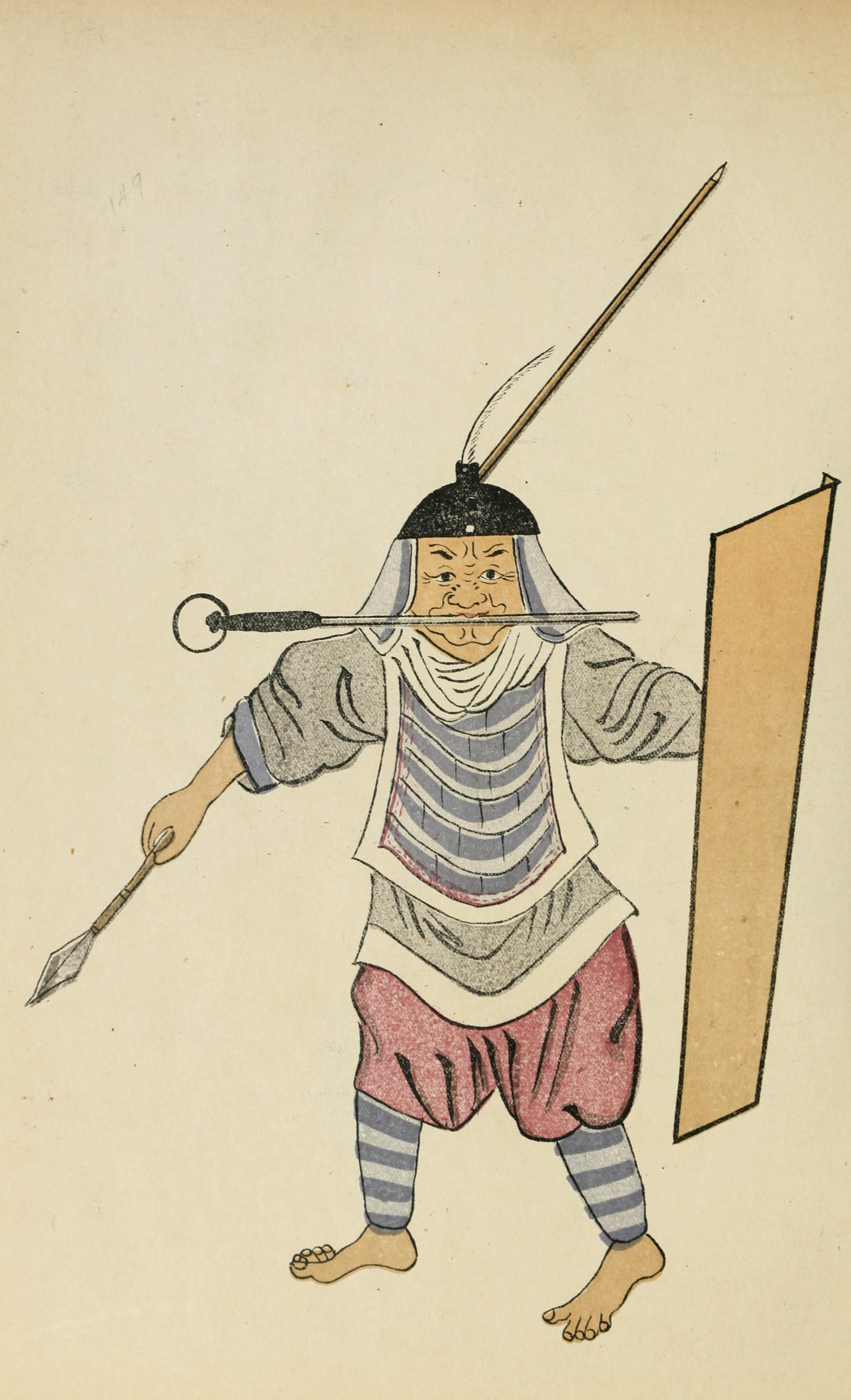
Yi warrior, 1910

== See also ==
- Torch Festival
- Liangshan Yi Autonomous Prefecture
- Honghe Hani and Yi Autonomous Prefecture
- Chuxiong Yi Autonomous Prefecture
- Hani people
- Bai people
- Yiminaspis, a prehistoric fish named in honor of the Yi.
- The Art of Not Being Governed
