= Sasi =

Sasi is an Indian and Nepali male and female name, abstracted from ancient Sanskrit language, meaning "Moon". It is commonly used in India in various masculine and feminine given names.

Sasi may refer to:

== People ==
- Sasi (usurper), 7th century BC usurper in the Assyrian Empire
- I. V. Sasi (born 1948), Malayali Indian film director
- Sasi (director) (born 1968), director of Tamil films
- Sasi Shanker (1957–2016), director of Tamil and Malayali films
- A nickname for Indian chess Grandmaster Krishnan Sasikiran
- Kimmo Sasi (1952–2025), Finnish politician and lawyer

== Other ==
- Sasi, Croatia, a village near Velika Gorica
- Sasi, a fraction of the town of Calatafimi-Segesta in Sicily, Italy
- Sași, the Romanian term for Transylvanian Saxons
- Sasi language, a dialect of ǂʼAmkoe language of Botswana
- Saxons in medieval Serbia, known as Sasi

== See also ==
- SASI (disambiguation)
- Shashi (disambiguation)
- Sassi (disambiguation)
- Sassi Punnu (disambiguation)
