= SASI =

SASI may refer to:

- Shugart Associates System Interface, the first embodiment of what is now known as SCSI
- SASI (software), a student information system developed by Pearson School Systems
- Shiprock Associated Schools, Inc.
- Socialist Workers' Sport International, in German Sozialistische Arbeiter Sport Internationale
- Sonoran Arthropod Studies Institute, a Tucson, Arizona educational nonprofit.
- South Australian Sports Institute, an elite athlete training program in South Australia
- Sutherland Astronomical Society (officially Sutherland Astronomical Society Incorporated), an amateur astronomical society based in Sydney, Australia.
- Swanson Analysis Systems, Inc., the name Ansys was founded under
