= Jingzhou Ancient City =

- Ancient building
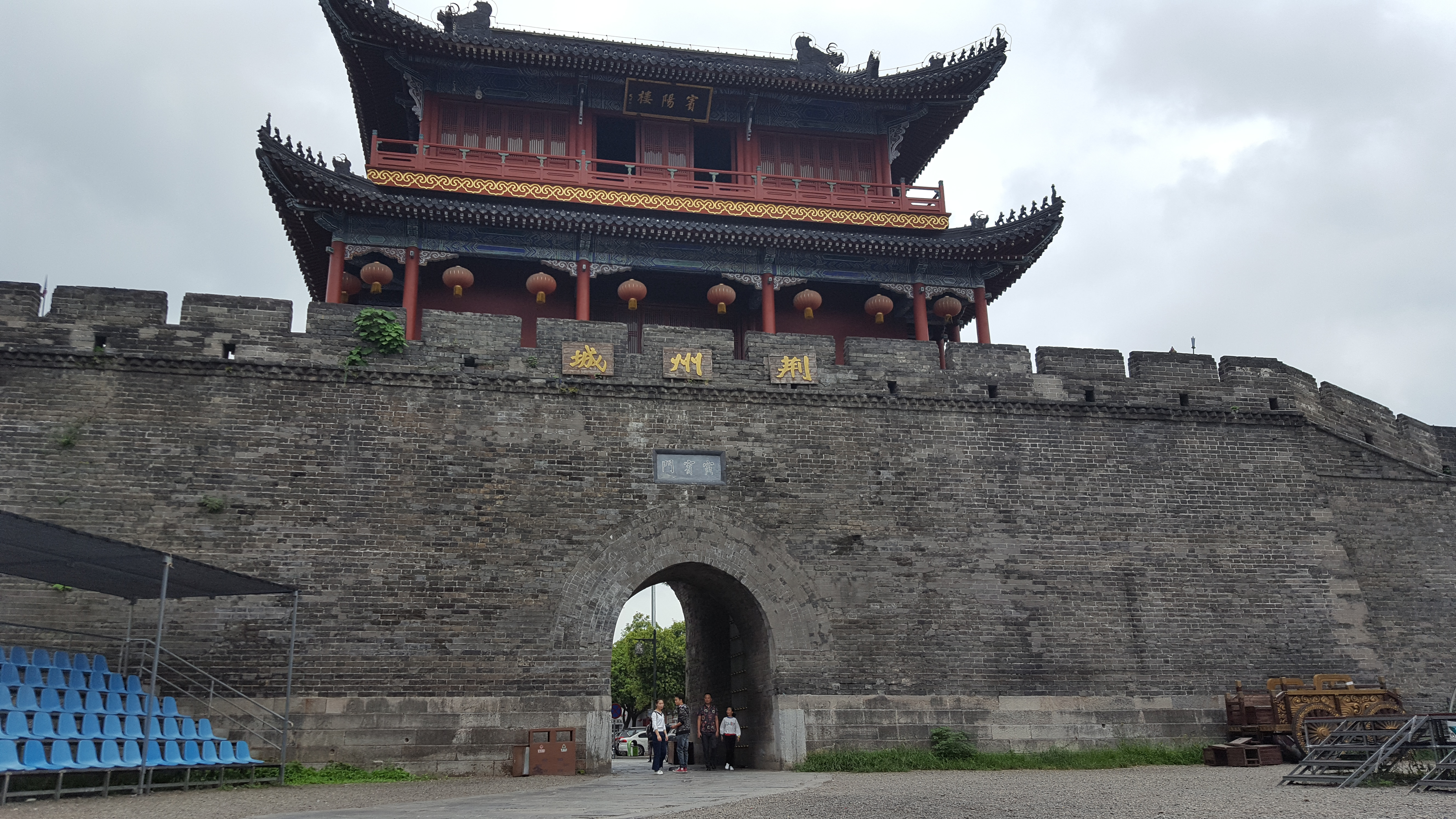
- Binyang Tower

The ancient city of Jingzhou, known as the Ancient Jiangling City, is located at Zhangjuzheng Street, Jingzhou District, Jingyang City.

The east–west diameter of Jingzhou ancient city is 3.75 kilometers (2.33 mi), the north–south diameter is 1.2 kilometers, with a total area of 4.5 km^{2} (1.7 sq mi). The city wall has a perimeter of 10.5 kilometers (6.5 mi) and a height of 8.83 meters (29.0 ft). There are six city gates, each of which has a tower. Bricks of the city wall are about one meter (3 ft 3 in) thick. The inner wall is built with rammed earth, and the lower part is about 9 meters (30 ft) wide. The city wall is 9 meters (30 ft) high and 11.281 km (7.01 mi) in circumference. The wall is built with special blue bricks and lime glutinous rice slurry.

The ancient city wall of Jingzhou was built in the Spring and Autumn period and the Warring States period. It used to be the official ship dock and palace of Chu State, and later became the foundation of Jiangling County, where the first city outline appeared. After more than 350 years, most of the existing ancient city walls were built in the late Ming and early Qing dynasties. The present ancient city is the remnants of the reconstruction of the Ming and Qing dynasties.

== History ==
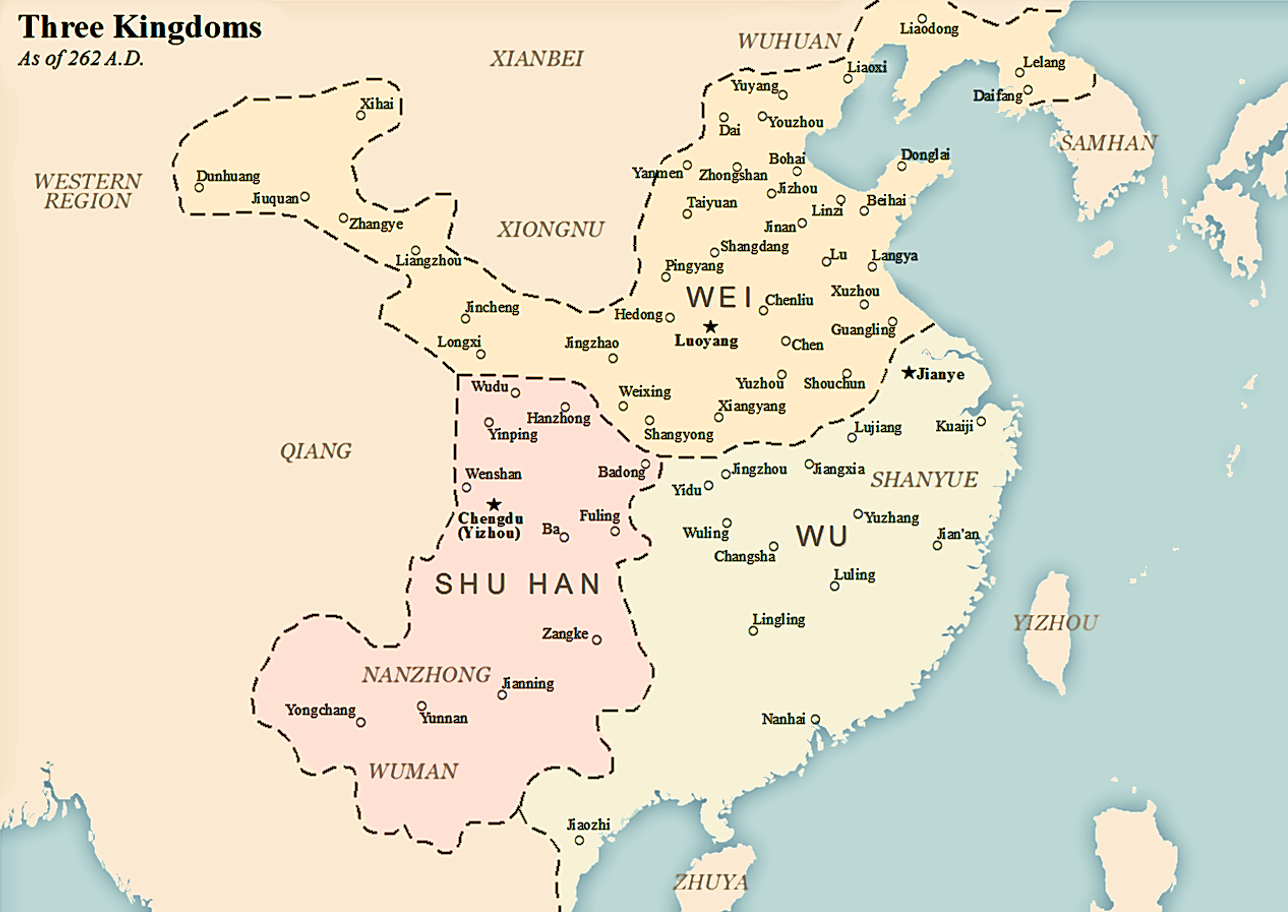
Jingzhou is located near the center of the three kingdoms.

Jingzhou is where the culture of the Three Kingdoms was born. In the era of Wei, Shu and Wu, this place was once a strategically important place for military strategists. Among the 120 chapters of Romance of the Three Kingdoms, there are 72 chapters involving Jingzhou. The well-known stories such as "Liu Bei borrowed Jingzhou" and "Guan Yu carelessly lost Jingzhou" happened in this city.

Since the Qin and Han dynasties, the ancient city of Jingzhou has always been an important city where the kings set up their residences. During the Qin dynasty, Jiangling County was set up here. During the Han dynasty, following the Qin system, Emperor Wu of the Han dynasty divided the whole country into thirteen states, and Jingzhou was one of them. At that time, Jingzhou was already one of the top ten commercial cities in the country. After that, Emperor An in the late Eastern Jin dynasty, Emperor Qi He, Emperor Liang Yuan, Emperor Xuan of Later Liang in the Southern dynasty, King Hou Liang in the Sui dynasty, and King Nanping in the late Tang dynasty, etc. Eleven disputed princes successively declared the capital here for more than 100 years.

== Statue of Guan Yu ==
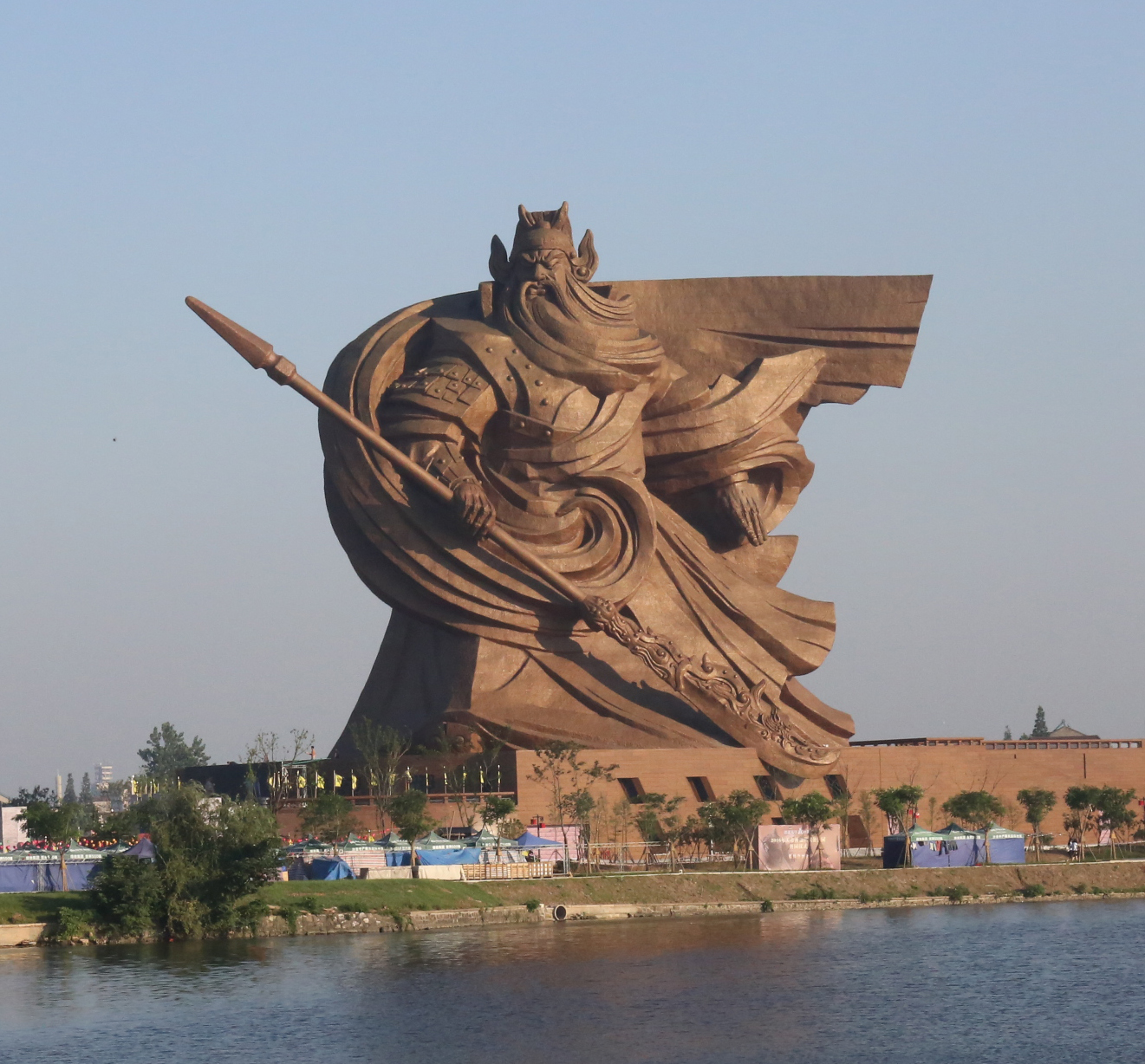
Statue of Guan Yu

Statue of Guan Yu is the first phase of the expansion and upgrading project of Jingzhou Ancient City Historical and Cultural Tourism Zone. The project is located on the southeast side of the ancient city of Jingzhou, adjacent to the environmental moat in the northeast, with a planned land area of 228 mu. The sculpture together with the base is 58 meters (190 ft) high and weighs more than 1,200 tons. There are more than 4,000 bronze pieces attached to the outside, with an average weight of 150 kg (330 lb) per piece.

In 2020, it was announced that the statue is to be relocated.

== Guan Yu Temple ==
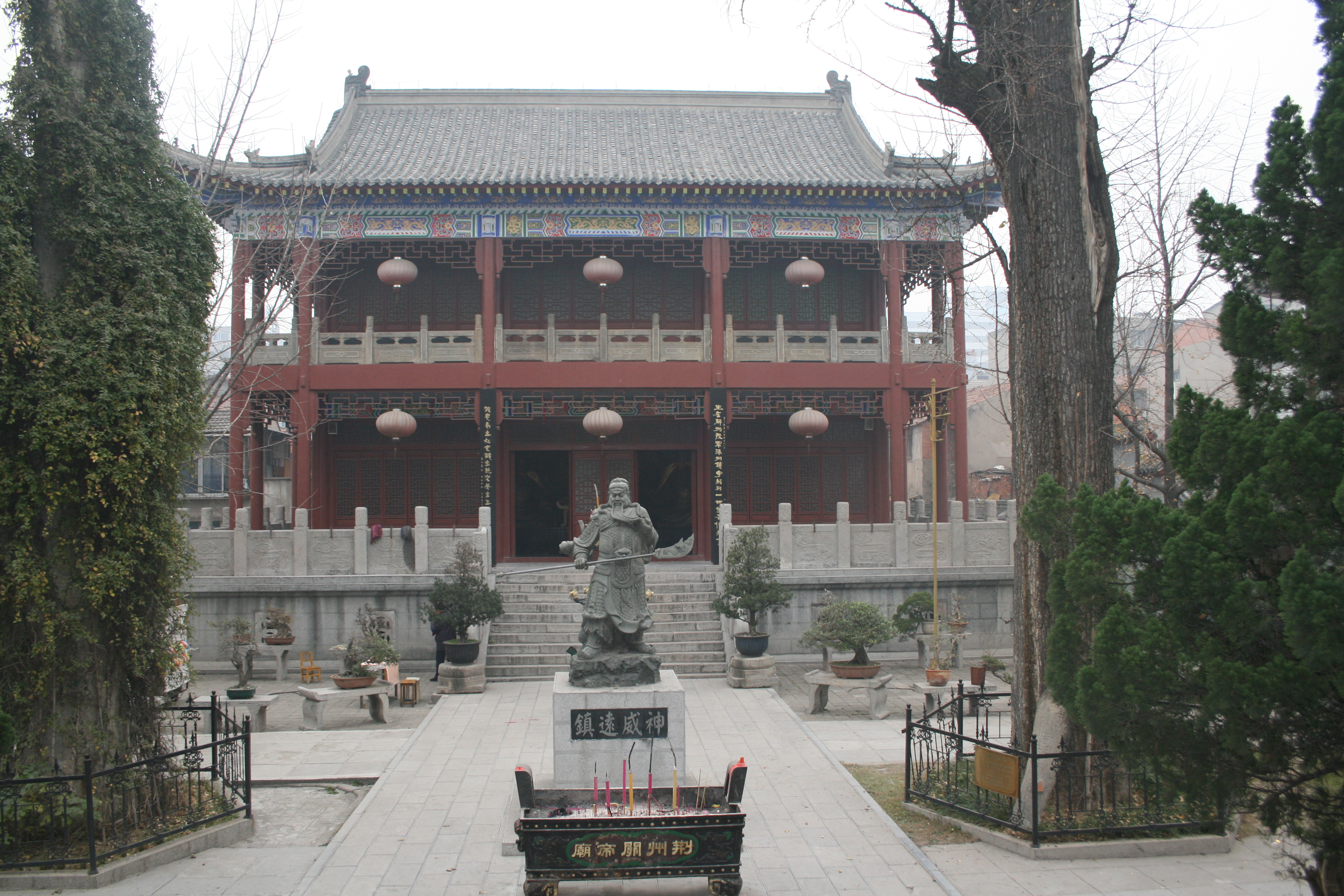
Guan Yu Temple

Jingzhou Guandi Temple is located inside the south gate of Jingzhou Ancient City. It was originally the foundation of Guan Yu's mansion who guarded Jingzhou for more than 10 years during the Three Kingdoms period. Later, it was hereditary guarded by the descendants of his son Guan Ping. It is the earliest Guan Temple established in the country, and is listed as one of the four major Guan Gong memorial shrines in China, along with Guandi Temple in Jiezhou, Shanxi, Guanling in Dangyang, Hubei, and Guanlin in Luoyang, Henan.
