= Shashi =

Shashi may refer to:

== Places and jurisdictions ==
=== China ===
- Shashi City (沙市市), Hubei from 1949 to 1994
- Shashi District (沙市区), Jingzhou, Hubei (historically, Shashi City) since 1994
  - Apostolic Prefecture of Shashi
  - Jingmen–Shashi railway, single-track railway in Hubei province, China
- Shashi, Liuyang (沙市镇), town in Hunan province
- Shashi, Shaodong (砂石镇), town of Shaodong County, Hunan province

=== Africa ===
- Shashi River or Shashe River, major left-bank tributary of the Limpopo River in Zimbabwe

== People ==
Shashi is an Indian and Nepali male and female name, abstracted from ancient Sanskrit language, meaning "Moon".

=== Politics ===
- Shashi Kumar (born 1965), actor and politician from Karnataka, India
- Shashi Shrestha, Nepalese politician, Central Committee member of Janamorcha Nepal
- Shashi Tharoor (born 1956), Indian Minister of State for Human Resource Development

=== Culture, science and entertainment ===
- Shashi Caan, American architect, designer, advocacy icon, founder of The Shashi Caan Collective
- Shashibhusan Dasgupta (1911–1964), Bengali scholar of philosophy, languages and literature
- Shashi Deshpande (born 1938), Indian novelist
- Shashi Gupta (born 1964), Indian Test and One Day International cricketer
- Shashi Isaac (born 1982), football player (midfielder) from Saint Kitts & Nevis
- Shashikala (1933–2021), Indian actress
- Shashi Kapoor (1938–2017), Indian film actor, director and producer
- Shashi P. Karna (born 1956), Indian-American nanotechnology
- Shashi Naidoo (born 1980), South African actress, model and television anchor
- Shashi Nambisan, Indian-born director of the Center for Transportation Research and Education at Iowa State University
- Shashi Puri, Hindi film actor
- Shashi Warrier, Indian author of Hangman's Journal
- Shashi Mittal, co-founder of Shashi Sumeet Productions

== Other ==
- Shashi language or Ikizu language, a Bantu language spoken by the Ikizu peoples of Tanzania
- Shashi Tharoor's Oxford Union Speech, speech made in 2015 by the latter
- Shashi Sumeet Productions, Indian Entertainment company

== See also ==
- Sasi (disambiguation)
- Shashthi
- Shashti
