= Sassi =

Sassi may refer to:

- Sassi (surname)
- Sassi, Estonia
- Sassi di Matera, UNESCO World Heritage Site in Basilicata, Italy
- Sassi, titular heroine of the Sindhi and Punjabi folktale Sassi Punnu
  - Sassi (film), a 1954 Pakistani film in the Urdu language

== See also ==
- Sasi (disambiguation)
- Sassi Punnu (disambiguation)
