= Sassi Punnu =

Sassui Punnhun or Sassi Punnu is a love story from Sindhi, Balochi and Punjabi folklore.

Sassi Punnu may also refer to:

- Sassi Punnu (1958 film), a 1958 Pakistani film in the Sindhi language
- Sassi Punnu (1983 film), a 1983 Indian Punjabi film
- Sassi Punno, a 2004 Urdu film from Pakistan

== See also ==
- Sassi (disambiguation)
- Sasi (disambiguation)
