= Jingmen–Shashi railway =

Single-track railway line in Hubei Province, China

Jingmen–Shashi railway or Jingsha railway (simplified Chinese: 荆沙铁路; traditional Chinese: 荊沙鐵路; pinyin: jīngshā tiělù), is a single-track regional railroad in Hubei Province of central China between Jingmen and Shashi District of Jingzhou. The line is 74.1 km (46 mi) long, and was built between 1986 and 1989. It opened in May 1989. The line runs from Shashi on the Yangtze River north to Jingmen and is used to carry freight, including coal and iron ore. The line's five stations are Jingmen South, Tuanlin, Shayang, Jingzhou North and Shashi.

== Rail connections ==
- Jingmen: Jiaozuo–Liuzhou railway

== See also ==
- List of railways in China
