= Sassi (surname) =

Sassi is both an Italian and Arab surname. Notable people with the surname include:

- Amos Sassi (born 1979), retired Israeli footballer
- Carlo Sassi (1929–2025), Italian journalist
- Bruno Sassi (born 1970), American professional wrestler
- Dan Sassi (2003), English footballer
- Ezzeddine Hadj Sassi (born 1962), retired Tunisian footballer
- Ferjani Sassi (born 1992), Tunisian footballer
- Franco Sassi (1912–1993), Italian painter, printmaker and engraver
- Giovanni Battista Sassi (1679–1762), Italian painter
- Jean Sassi (1917–2009), French Army colonel and intelligence service officer
- Ludovico Rusconi Sassi (1678–1736), Italian architect of the Rococo period
- Mohamed Karim Sassi (born 1968), Tunisian triple jumper
- Moriz Sassi (1880–1967), Austrian ornithologist
- Nizar Sassi (born 1979), French detained in the naval base at Guantanamo Bay, Cuba
- Pietro Sassi (1834 -1905), Italian painter
- Sadok Sassi (born 1945), former Tunisian footballer
- Jorge Sassi (1947–2015), Argentine actor
- Yossi Sassi (born 1975), Israeli guitarist and music producer
