= Jingzhou =

Jingzhou 荆州市 Kingchow
- Prefecture-level city
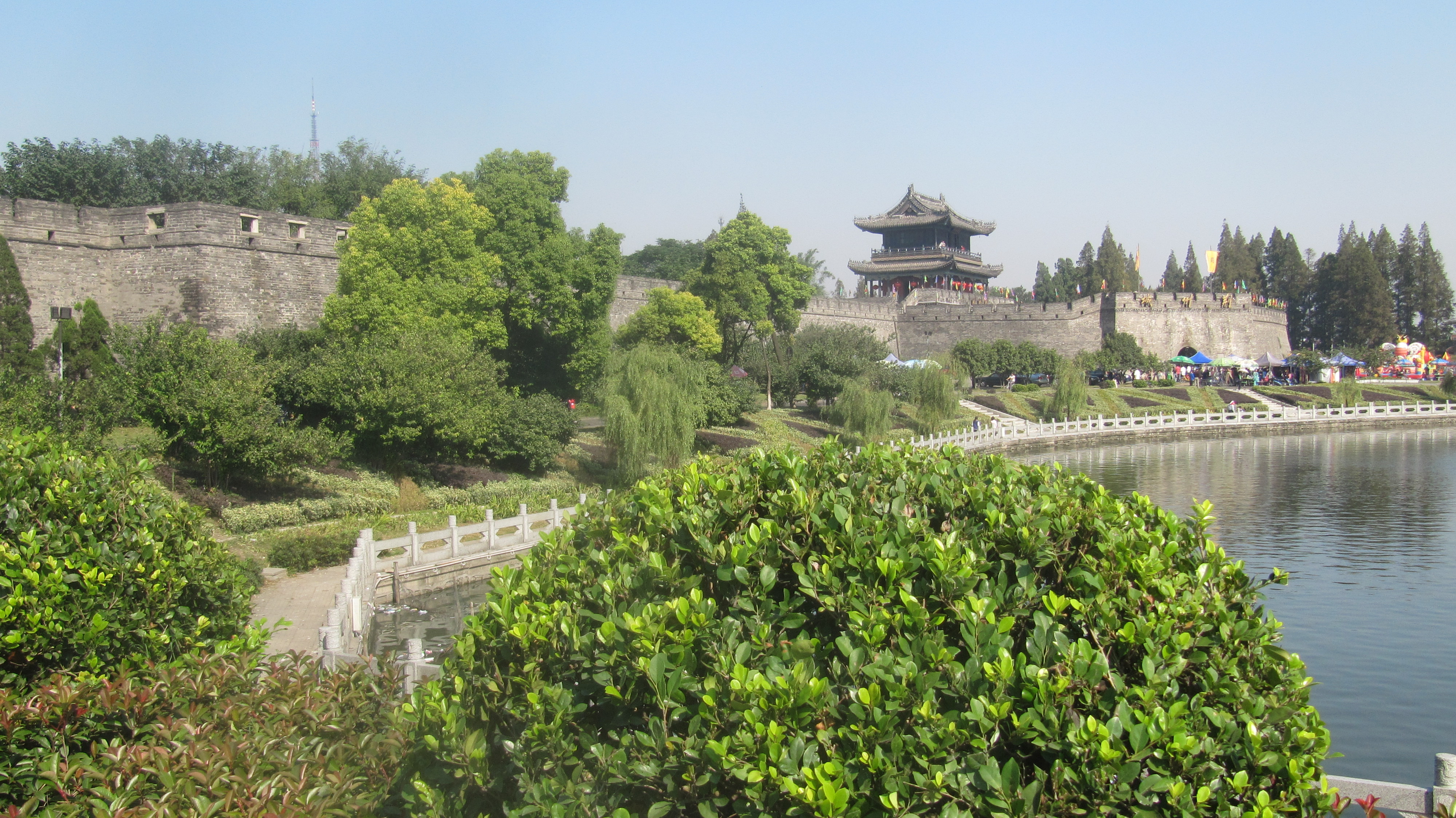
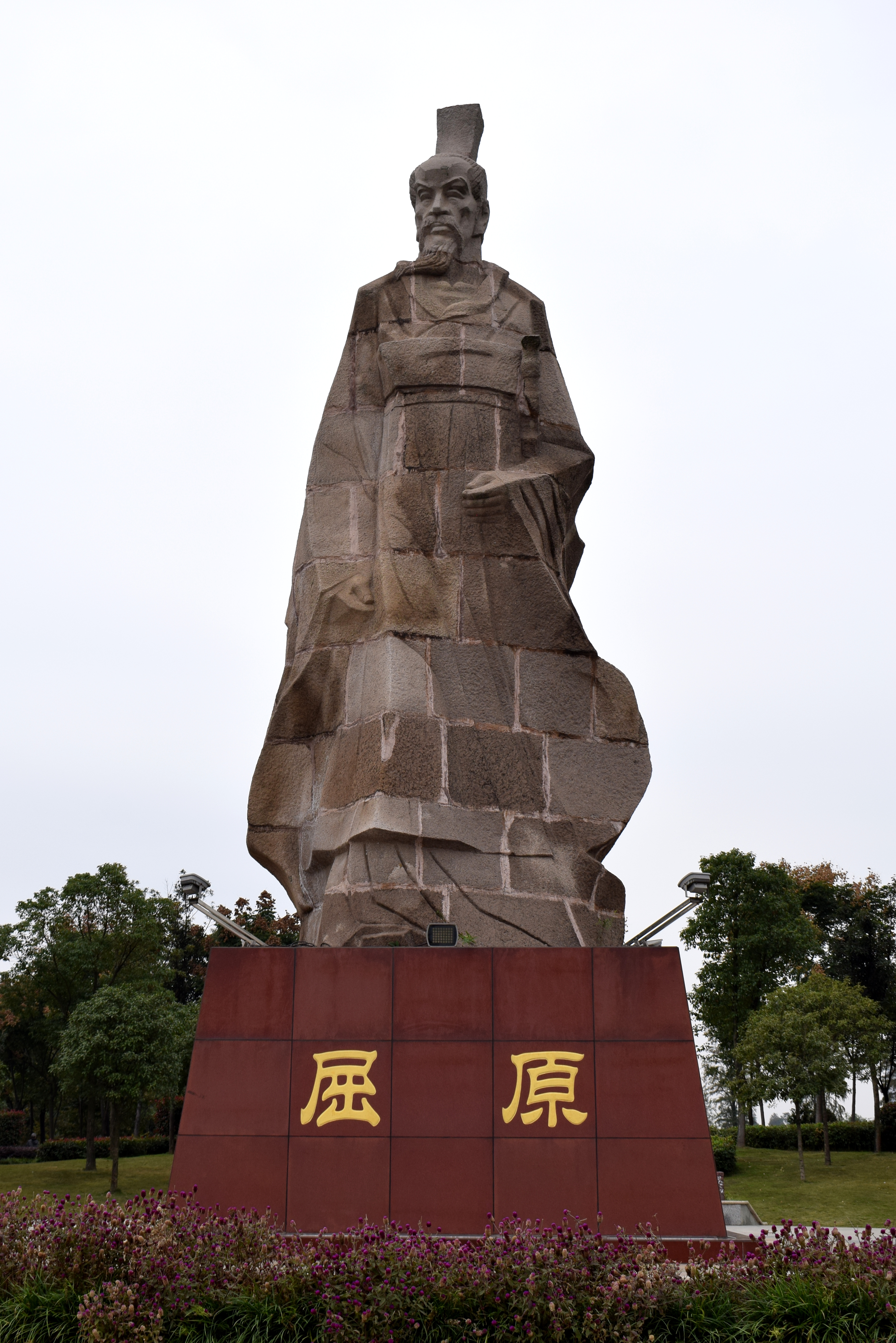
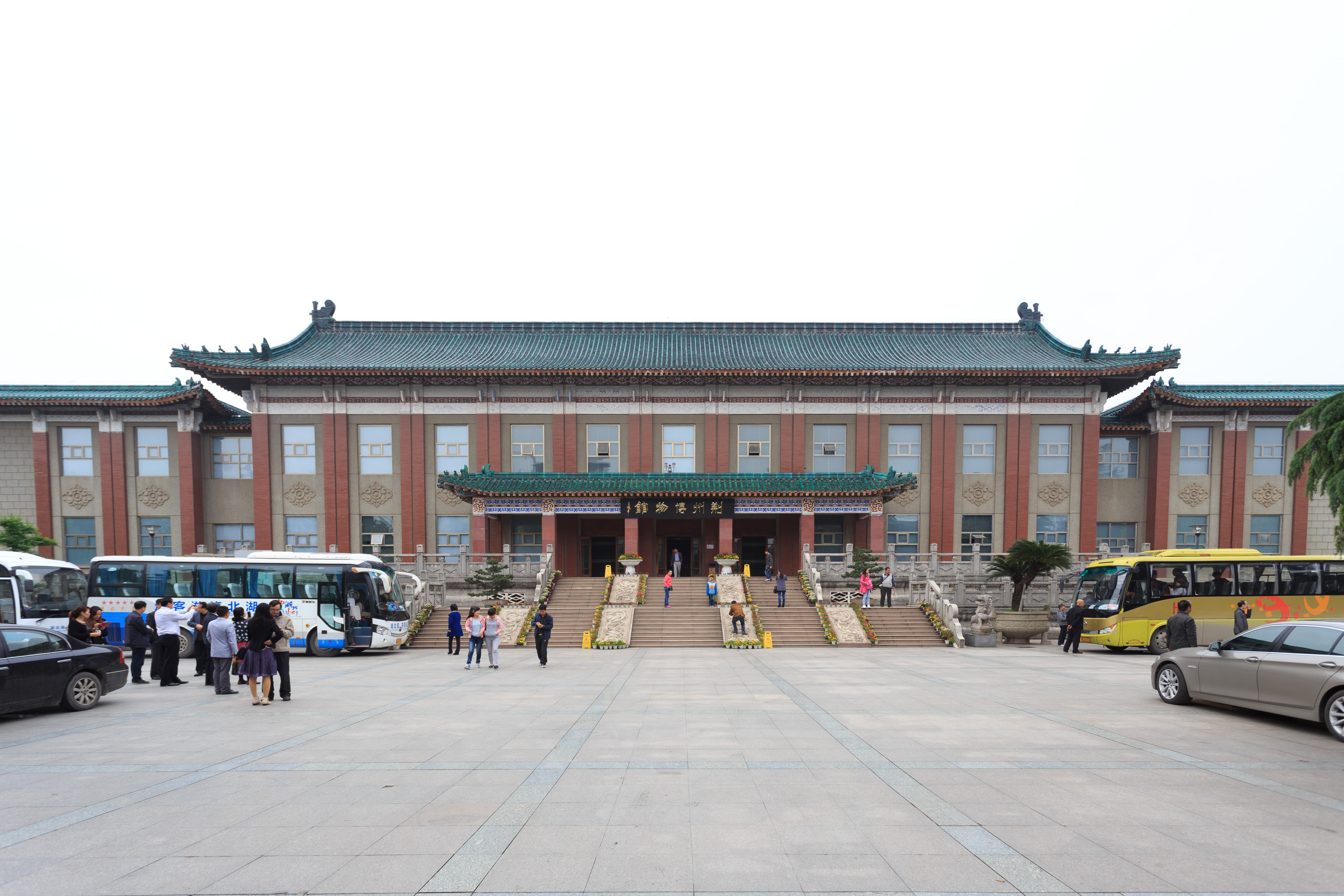
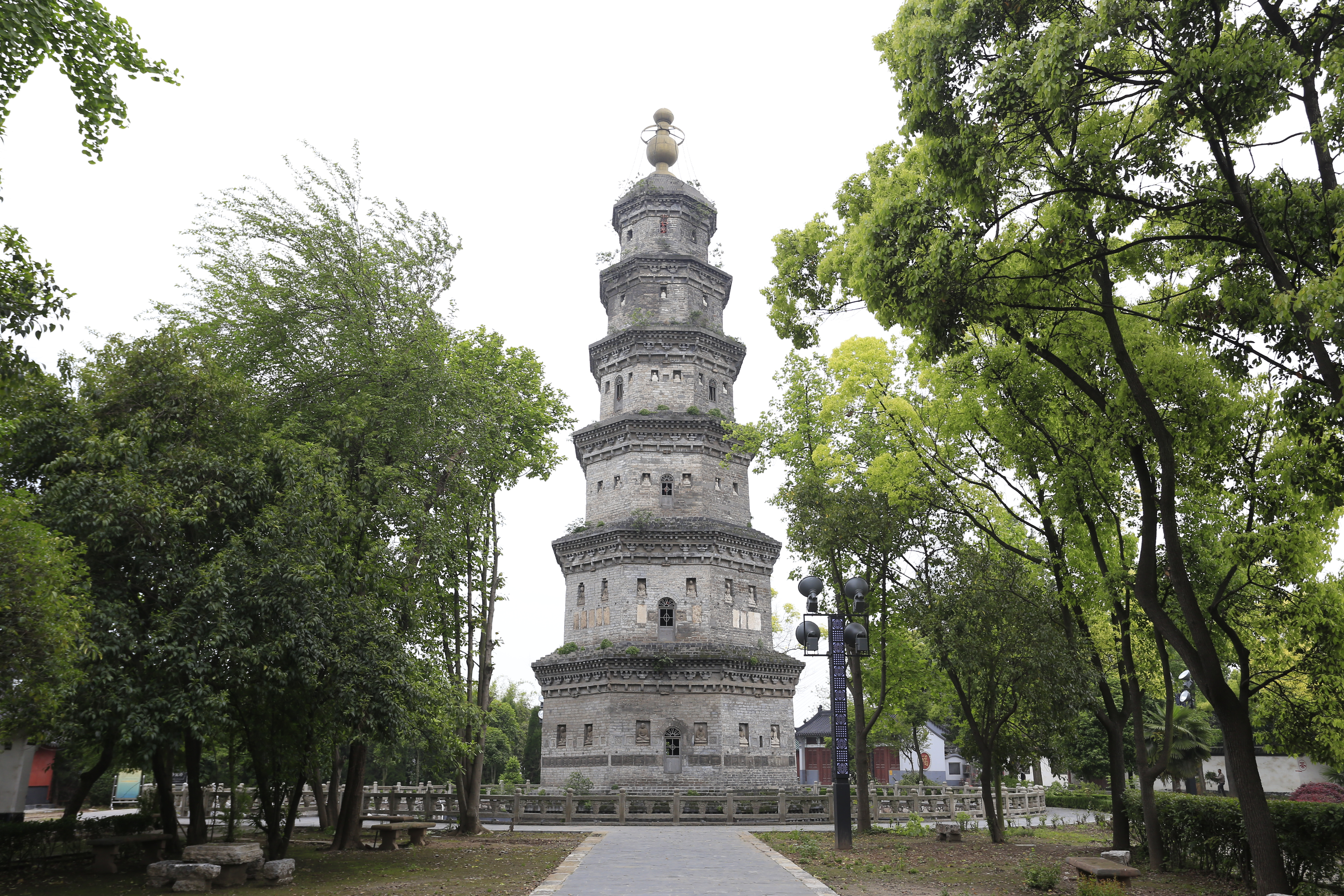
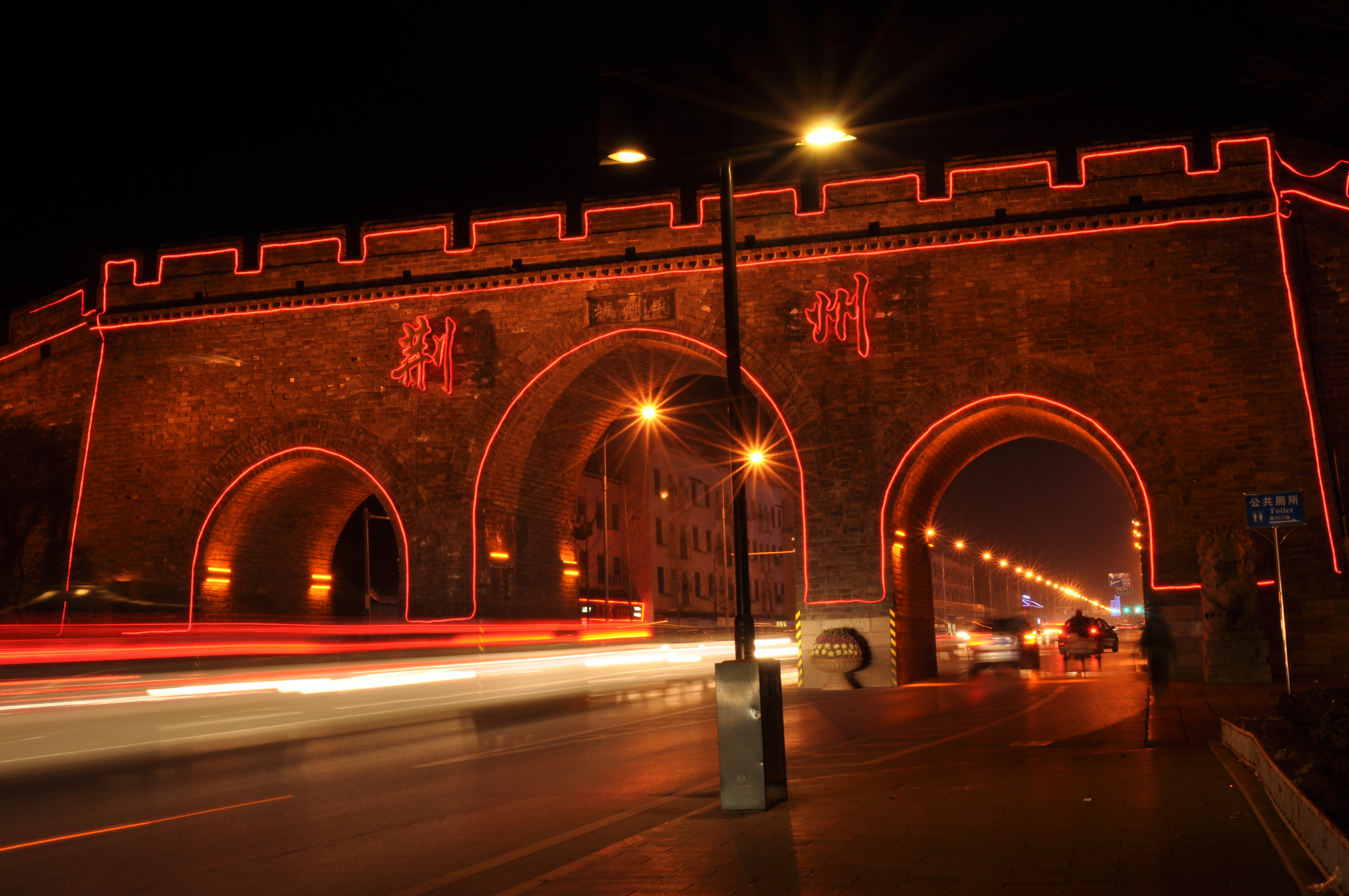
- Jingzhou Ancient City Statue of Qu Yuan Jingzhou Museum Wanshou Pagoda Eastern Gate of the Old City Wall

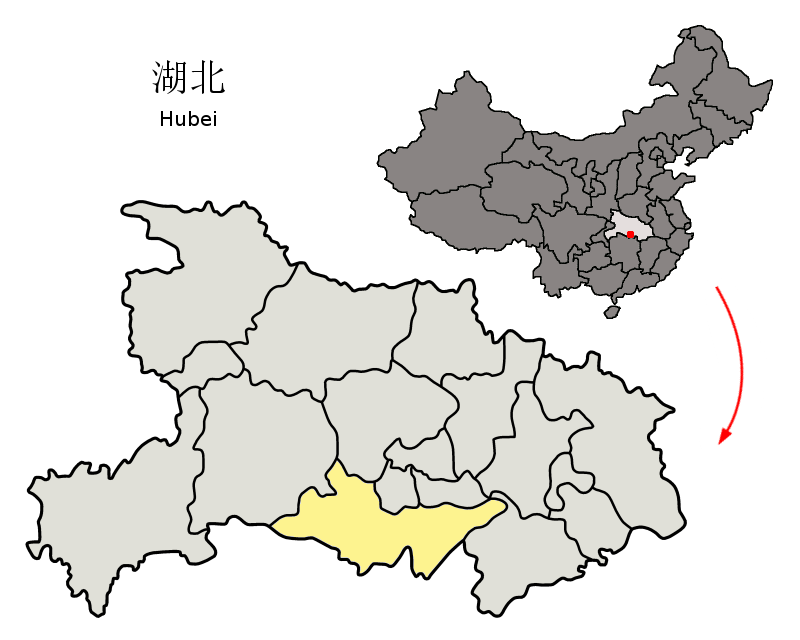
- Location of Jingzhou City jurisdiction in Hubei

- Location of the city center in Hubei Jingzhou (China)
- Coordinates (Jingzhou municipal government): 30°20′11″N 112°14′29″E
- Country: People's Republic of China
- Province: Hubei
- Municipal seat: Shashi District

Area
  - Prefecture-level city: 14,068.68 km^{2} (5,431.95 sq mi)
  - Urban: 1,576.0 km^{2} (608.5 sq mi)
  - Metro: 1,576.0 km^{2} (608.5 sq mi)

Population (2020 census)
  - Prefecture-level city: 5,231,180
  - Density: 371.832/km^{2} (963.039/sq mi)
  - Urban: 1,068,291
  - Urban density: 677.85/km^{2} (1,755.6/sq mi)
  - Metro: 1,068,291
  - Metro density: 677.85/km^{2} (1,755.6/sq mi)

GDP
  - Prefecture-level city: CN¥ 159.1 billion US$ 25.5 billion
  - Per capita: CN¥ 27,781; US$ 4,460
- Time zone: UTC+8 (China Standard)
- ISO 3166 code: CN-HB-10
- Licence plate prefixes: 鄂D
- Website: jingzhou.gov.cn

Jingzhou
- "Jingzhou", as written in Simplified Chinese
- Simplified Chinese: 荆州
- Traditional Chinese: 荊州
- Postal: Kingchow
Transcriptions
Standard Mandarin
- Hanyu Pinyin: Jīngzhōu

Jingzhou (Chinese: 荆州; pinyin: Jīngzhōu) is a prefecture-level city in southern Hubei province, China, located on the banks of the Yangtze River. Its total residential population was 5,231,180 according to the 2020 census, 1,068,291 of whom resided in the built-up (or metro) area comprising two urban districts.

Jingzhou's central urban area has grown out of Shashi City and Jingzhou Town (historically also known as Jiangling); their names were preserved in the names of Shashi District and Jingzhou District, which include the city's historical center, as well as Jiangling County, which administers the suburban areas of the larger historical area of Jiangling. The name "Shashi" also remains in the names of a number of local facilities, such as Jingzhou Shashi Airport and a railway freight station.

== Toponymy ==
The contemporary city of Jingzhou is named after ancient province of the same name, which was one of the nine provinces of ancient China. Said province was named after the nearby Jing Mountains.

== Geography and climate ==
Jingzhou occupies an area of 14,067 square kilometres (5,431 sq mi) with a topography rising from east to west. It is covered by a dense network of waterways, as well as lakes, and is located in the middle reaches of the Yangtze River on the Jianghan Plain. Downstream to its east lies Wuhan, the provincial capital, and to the west lies the city of Yichang, the Three Gorges, and Chongqing Municipality. Jingmen City, also in Hubei, lies to the north; to its south are Yueyang and Changde, both in Hunan Province. 12.42% of the city's area is forested.

Jingzhou has a humid subtropical climate (Köppen Cfa), with hot, humid summers, and damp, chilly, but drier winters. Monthly daily average temperatures range from 4.1 °C (39.4 °F) in January to 28.0 °C (82.4 °F) in July. The area receives 1,800 to 2,000 hours of sunshine per year and has a frost-free period of 242−263 days annually.

Climate data for Jingzhou, elevation 32 m (105 ft), (1991–2020 normals, extremes 1971–present)
Month	Jan	Feb	Mar	Apr	May	Jun	Jul	Aug	Sep	Oct	Nov	Dec	Year
Record high °C (°F)	21.9 (71.4)	27.0 (80.6)	32.0 (89.6)	33.3 (91.9)	35.4 (95.7)	37.2 (99.0)	38.7 (101.7)	39.4 (102.9)	36.8 (98.2)	33.2 (91.8)	29.7 (85.5)	21.1 (70.0)	39.4 (102.9)
Mean daily maximum °C (°F)	8.2 (46.8)	11.2 (52.2)	15.9 (60.6)	22.1 (71.8)	27.0 (80.6)	30.0 (86.0)	32.3 (90.1)	32.1 (89.8)	28.3 (82.9)	22.9 (73.2)	16.6 (61.9)	10.7 (51.3)	21.4 (70.6)
Daily mean °C (°F)	4.4 (39.9)	7.0 (44.6)	11.4 (52.5)	17.3 (63.1)	22.2 (72.0)	25.8 (78.4)	28.3 (82.9)	27.8 (82.0)	23.6 (74.5)	18.1 (64.6)	12.1 (53.8)	6.6 (43.9)	17.0 (62.7)
Mean daily minimum °C (°F)	1.6 (34.9)	3.8 (38.8)	7.9 (46.2)	13.5 (56.3)	18.5 (65.3)	22.6 (72.7)	25.2 (77.4)	24.7 (76.5)	20.3 (68.5)	14.7 (58.5)	8.9 (48.0)	3.5 (38.3)	13.8 (56.8)
Record low °C (°F)	−14.9 (5.2)	−9.2 (15.4)	−1.6 (29.1)	−0.1 (31.8)	9.8 (49.6)	13.0 (55.4)	18.1 (64.6)	15.8 (60.4)	10.6 (51.1)	1.7 (35.1)	−3.0 (26.6)	−6.3 (20.7)	−14.9 (5.2)
Average precipitation mm (inches)	37.3 (1.47)	46.3 (1.82)	69.5 (2.74)	118.8 (4.68)	132.4 (5.21)	158.9 (6.26)	172.6 (6.80)	110.6 (4.35)	70.5 (2.78)	74.1 (2.92)	53.1 (2.09)	24.0 (0.94)	1,068.1 (42.06)
Average precipitation days (≥ 0.1 mm)	8.4	9.1	11.7	12.4	13.0	12.3	10.9	9.6	8.6	10.1	9.3	7.0	122.4
Average snowy days	4.4	3.2	1	0	0	0	0	0	0	0	0.3	1.4	10.3
Average relative humidity (%)	75	75	76	77	76	79	81	79	76	76	77	74	77
Mean monthly sunshine hours	83.5	86.5	116.7	138.0	145.4	143.2	195.4	200.1	145.4	129.3	113.5	99.8	1,596.8
Percentage possible sunshine	26	27	31	36	34	34	46	49	40	37	36	32	36
Source 1: China Meteorological Administration all-time extreme temperature
Source 2: Weather China

== Demographics ==
According to the 2010 census, the prefecture-level city of Jingzhou has 5,691,707 inhabitants and a population density of 405 inhabitants per km^{2}.

As of the 7th census of Jingzhou done by the municipal government, Jingzhou's population had shrunk slightly to an estimated 5,231,180 inhabitants, residing in about 1,833,292 households. Of Jingzhou's residential population, 2,664,658 or 50.94 percent were males while 2,566,522 of 49.06 percent were females. The sex ratio was 103.82 (female=100, male to female). There were 534,914 persons with university education. Compared with 2010, the number of people with university education went up from 6,828 persons to 10,225 persons per 100,000 persons, the average years of schooling for people aged 15 and above increased from 8.81 years to 9.29 years, and the illiteracy rate dropped from 4.41 percent (251,100) to 2.79 (145,900) percent. Additionally, Shashi and Jingzhou districts' the average years of schooling for people aged 15 were longer than 10 years.

== Administration ==
The prefecture-level city of Jingzhou has jurisdiction over two districts, three county-level cities, three counties and one economic and technological development zone. The information here presented uses the metric system and data from the 2010 census.

Map
Name	Simplified Chinese	Hanyu Pinyin	Area (km^{2})	Population (2010)	Density (/km^{2})
Shashi District	沙市区	Shāshì Qū	469	498,526	1,063
Jingzhou District	荆州区	Jīngzhōu Qū	1,046	553,756	529
Jingzhou Economic and Technological Development Zone	荆州经济技术开发区	Jīngzhōu Jīngjì Jìshù Kāifāqū		101,804	
Songzi City	松滋市	Sōngzī Shì	2,235	765,911	343
Shishou City	石首市	Shíshǒu Shì	1,427	577,022	404
Honghu City	洪湖市	Hónghú Shì	2,519	819,446	325
Jianli City	监利市	Jiànlì Shì	3,118	1,162,770	373
Jiangling County	江陵县	Jiānglíng Xiàn	1,032	331,344	321
Gong'an County	公安县	Gōng'ān Xiàn	2,258	881,128	390

== Economy ==
As of 2019, Jingzhou has a GDP of ¥251.648 billion, which grew at an annual rate of 7.5%. 17.3% of the city's GDP came from its primary sector, 37.1% came from its secondary sector, and 45.6% came from its tertiary sector. As of 2019, most of the city's economic growth is derived from its secondary and tertiary sectors, which grew at an annual rate of 8.1% and 8.8%, respectively. The city's residents had a per capita disposable income of ¥26,543, a 9.8% annual increase. Urban residents had a per capita disposable income of ¥35,910, while rural residents averaged ¥18,893 in disposable income. Jingzhou's per capita disposable income grew 10.2% for urban areas, and 9.2% for rural areas.

=== Agriculture ===
The size of Jingzhou's agriculture, forestry, animal husbandry, and aquaculture sector in 2019 totaled ¥76.645 billion. The city produced 4.5117 million tons of grain, 433 thousand tons of vegetable oil, 38,000 tons of cotton, and 3.1332 million tons of vegetables. In 2019, 2.9777 million heads of swine, and 63.9012 million heads of poultry were slaughtered in Jingzhou. 1.1195 million tons of aquaculture products were produced, with 45.77% (512.4 thousand tons) of this comprising shrimp and crabs.

=== Industry ===
In 2019, Jingzhou saw a 2.3% decline in light industry output, and a 17.0% rise in heavy industry output. The size of the city's state-owned economy shrank 3.4%, its collectively-owned economy grew 2.4%, and its privately owned economy grew 7.2%.

One of Jingzhou's most prominent industries is its construction industry, which earned ¥29.877 billion in 2019. As of 2019, the city has 385 construction firms.

=== Retail ===
In 2019, Jingzhou's consumer retail sales totaled ¥144.735 billion. Consumer retail sales grew at an annual rate of 11.5%.

=== Insurance ===
In 2019, the city's insurance industry made ¥16.293 billion in revenue off of premiums, a 15.0% increase from the previous year. Of this, ¥12.213 billion came from personal insurance, and ¥4.08 billion came from property insurance, an increase of 12.7% and 22.3% from 2018, respectively. Jingzhou's insurance industry paid 5.171 billion in compensation, a 1.8% increase from the previous year.

=== Foreign trade ===
In 2019, Jingzhou conducted 1.697 billion USD in foreign trade, a 6.8% decline from the previous year. Of this, imports accounted for 0.335 billion USD, and exports accounted for 1.363 billion USD.

== History ==
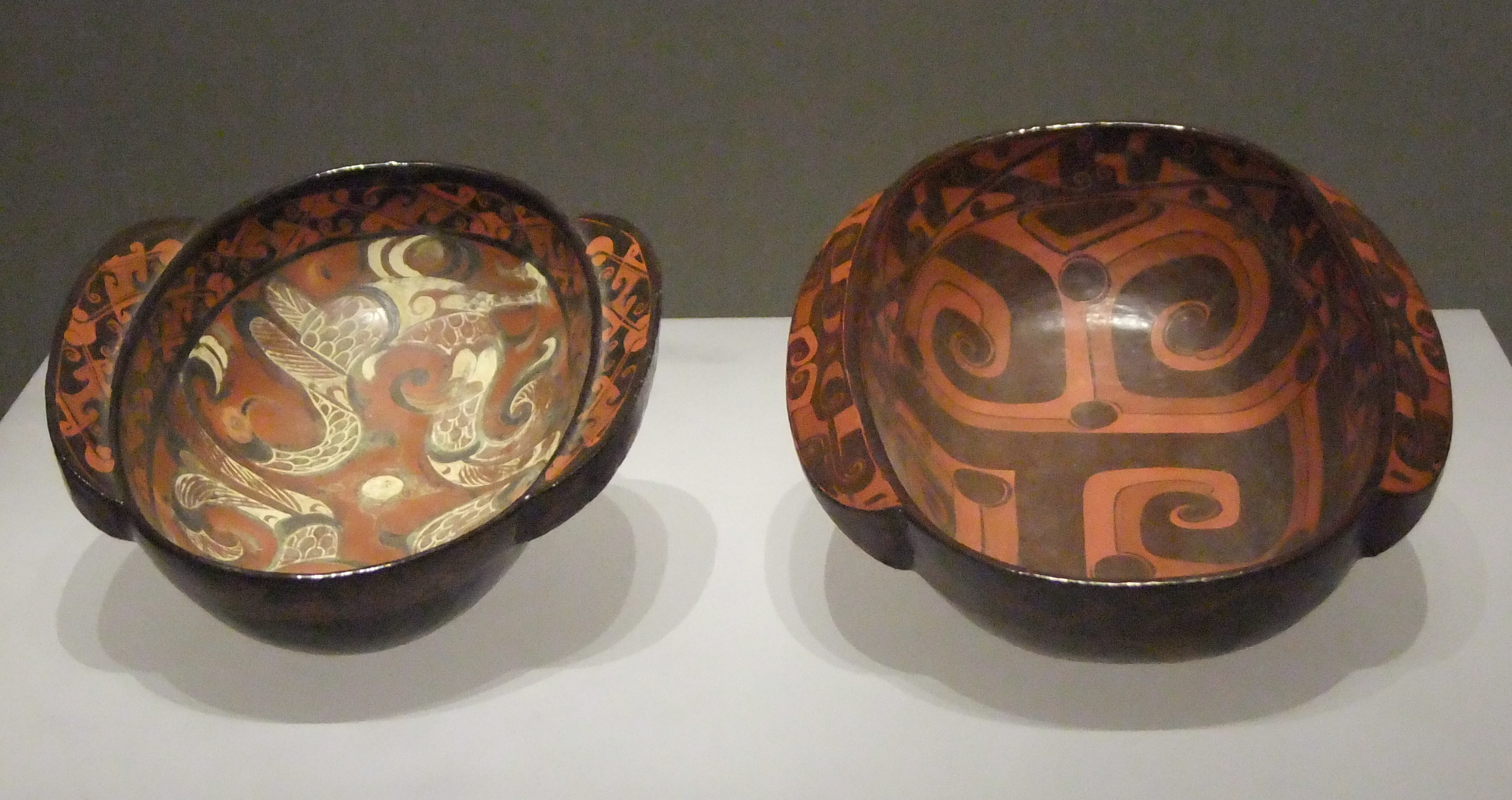
Lacquer bowls of cloud design, Warring States period, Jiangling, Hubei

Jingzhou has been inhabited for approximately 5,000 to 6,000 years, with the historic Daxi culture residing in present-day Jingzhou. Situated in the middle reaches of the Yangtze River, the area has been a strategic location of military importance since ancient times.

The area of present-day Jingzhou was where the State of Chu was founded. Ying, an ancient city within the borders of present-day Jingzhou, became the capital of the State of Chu in 689 BCE, and remained as such for over 400 years, including during the Spring and Autumn and Warring States periods of the Zhou dynasty.

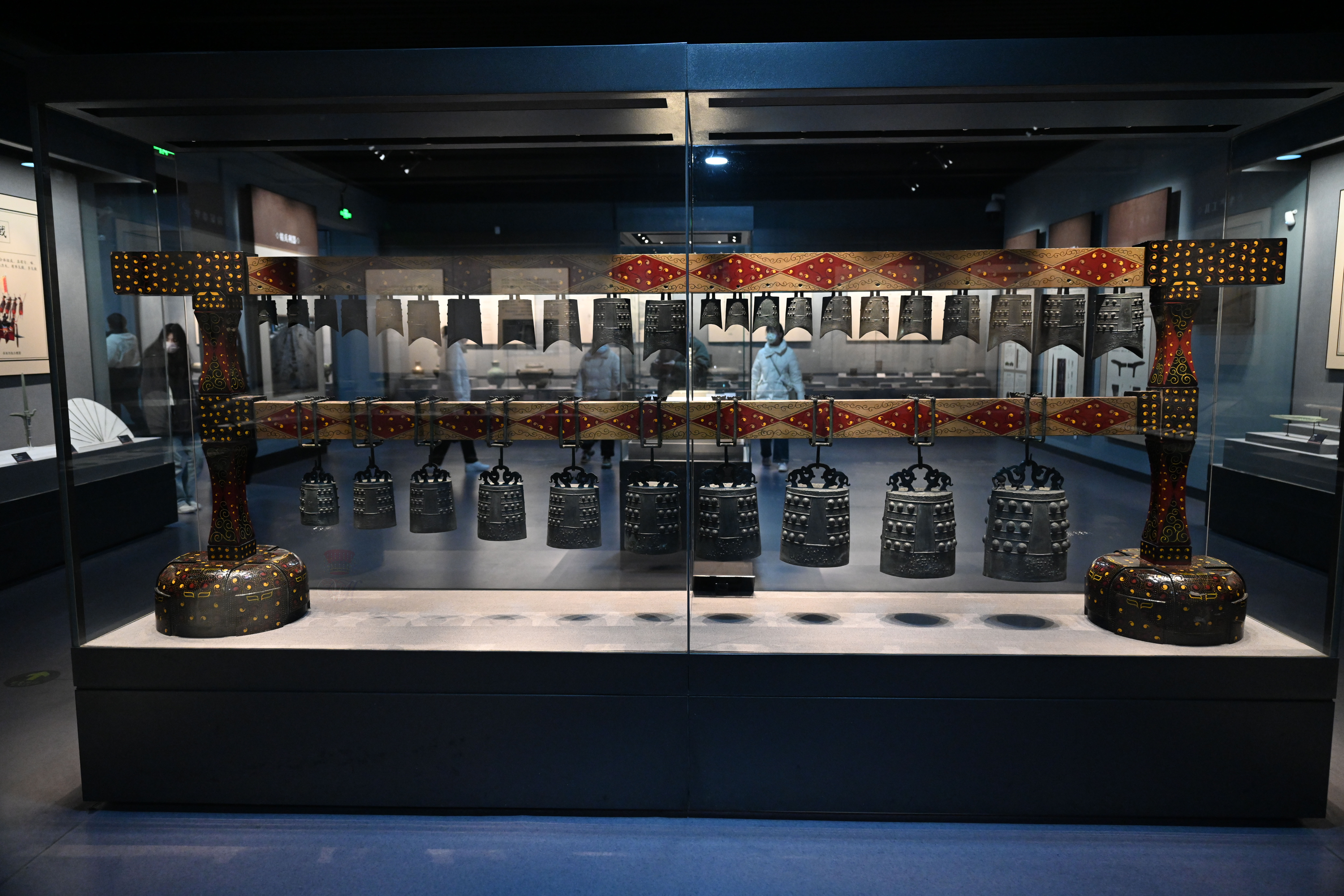
Set of bianzhong Tianxingguan Tomb No. 2 near Jingzhou, 4th century BC

During the Han dynasty and Three Kingdoms era, Jingzhou was known as Nanjun due to it being the seat of Nanjun district.

The city was lost to Eastern Wu by Guan Yu during the Three Kingdoms period leading to the modern phrase "dàyì shī Jīngzhōu" (大意失荆州), lit. 'carelessness lost Jingzhou'.

Under the Tang dynasty, it served as the southern capital and was known as Nandu (南都; 'south capital').

Later on, Jiangling was the capital of the Southern Qi and Liang dynasties. It was the capital of the small Jingnan Kingdom (also known as Nanping) that existed from 924 to 963 during the Five Dynasties and Ten Kingdoms period.

Jingzhou was the site of one of the last major battles between Republican and Qing forces during the Xinhai Revolution in 1911. At the end of the Qing dynasty, Jingzhou had one of the largest Manchu populations, around half of the city, anywhere outside Beijing.

In July 1949, the area was taken by the People's Liberation Army.

On September 29, 1994, Jiangling County and Shashi City were merged to create the prefecture-level city of Jingsha. On November 20, 1996, Jingsha was renamed to Jingzhou.

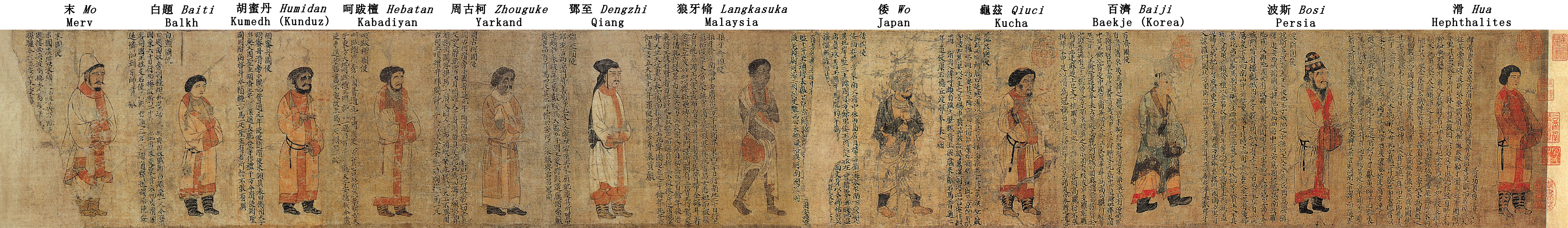
The Portraits of Periodical Offering of Liang with descriptions of each ambassador, led by the representative of the Hephthalites (far right), 526-539 CE, Jingzhou, Southern Liang painting. National Museum of China.

== Sights ==
Numerous sites have been preserved from the Chu State period, including the ruins of five Chu cities, 73 sites featuring Chu Culture and more than 800 ancient tombs, including those of 18 Chu kings.

There are also historical sites dating to the Three Kingdoms period, such as the Wulin Battlefield (where the Battle of Red Cliffs took place) and the Huarong Path.

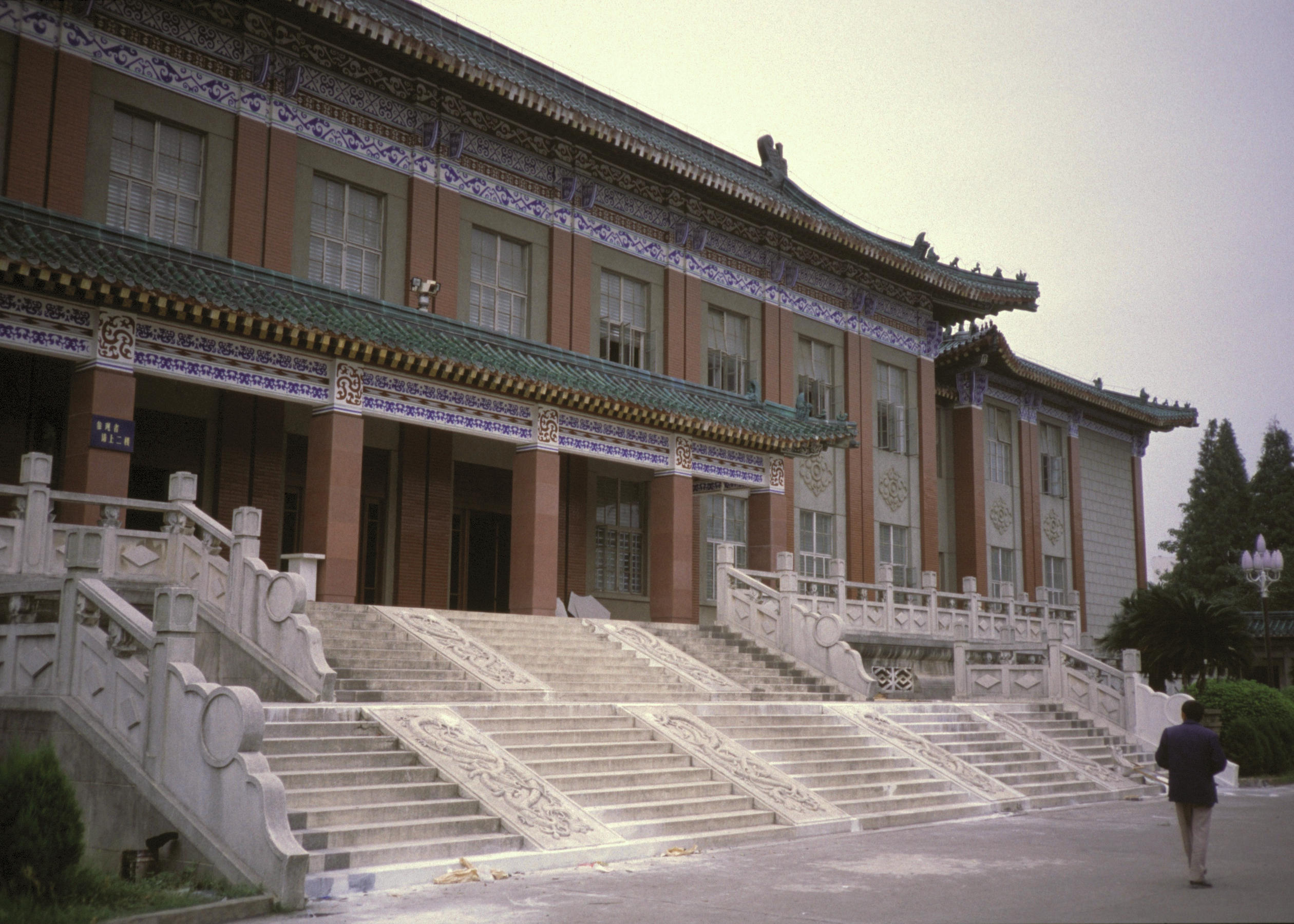
Jingzhou Museum

The city walls were rebuilt in 1646 and measure 9 metres (30 ft) high and 10 metres (33 ft) thick. The perimeter of the wall extends for 10.17 kilometres (6.32 mi). The city walls, city gates, watchtowers, and battlements have all been well maintained. Many of the towers on top of the majestic city gates have been damaged or rebuilt, leaving only the Chaozong Tower which was rebuilt in 1838 on the Gongji Gate.

The Jingzhou Museum has on display a well-preserved 2,000-year-old male corpse, as well as silk and lacquerware from the Warring States period.

A 58-meter-tall, 1,197-ton bronze Statue of Guan Yu designed by Han Meilin was constructed in Jingzhou in 2016. In 2021, the statue was dismantled, and is currently pending relocation to Dianjiangtai.

== Cuisine ==
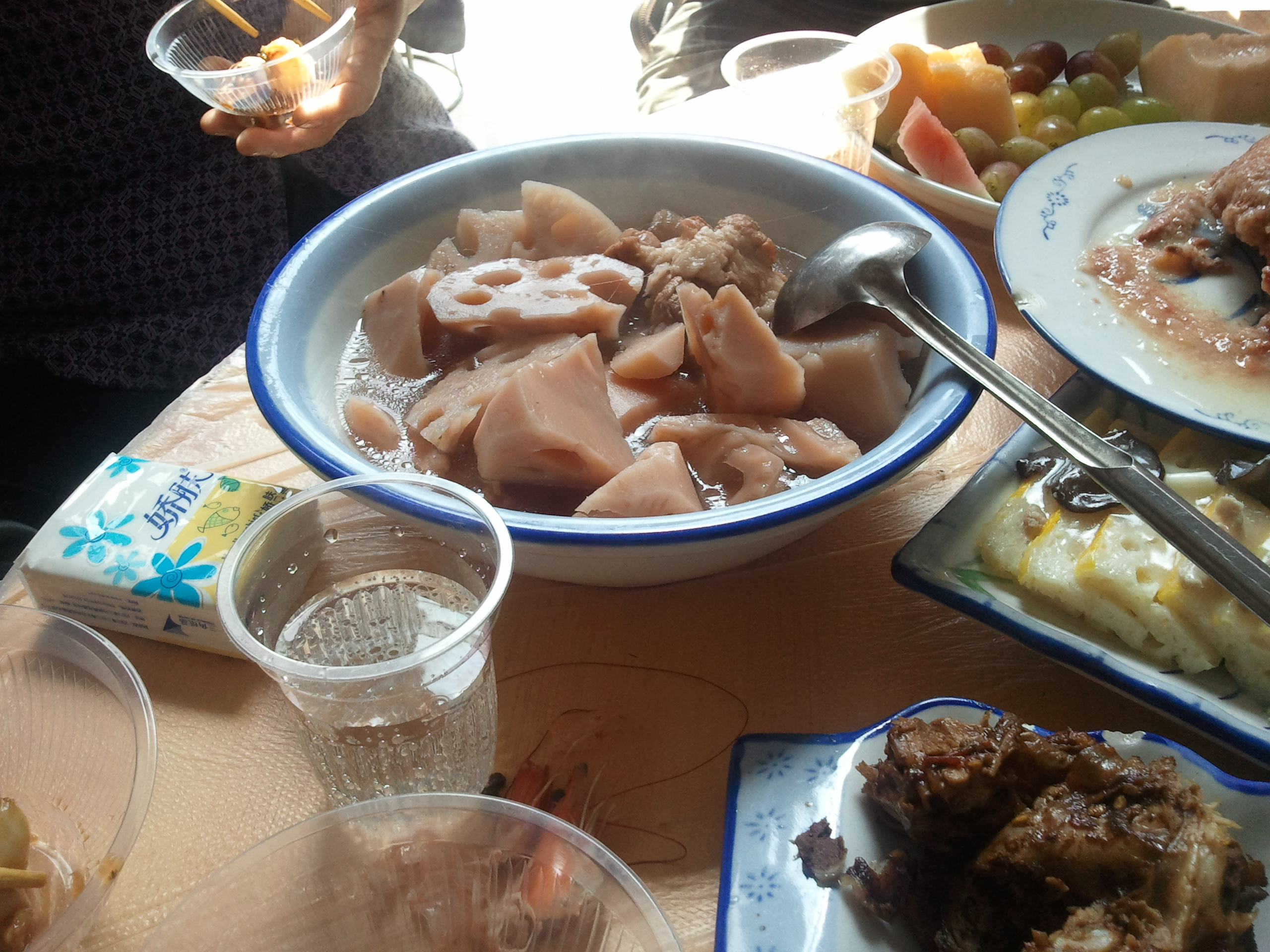
Lotus root soup, Hubei style. 2010 photo

Jingzhou is home to unique breakfast items. The city has a unique style of guokui, a Chinese flatbread, as well as a unique style of rice noodles.

== Education ==
There are 1,243 schools in Jingzhou, attended by about 707,300 students, as of 2019. Of this, there are 15 secondary vocational schools attended by 28,600 students, 53 general secondary schools attended by 82,800 students, 123 general junior high schools attended by 146,000 students, 396 primary schools attended by 308,500 students, 8 special education schools attended by 1,151 students, and 587 kindergartens attended by 140,300 students. The city's education system is staffed by about 53,400 faculty.

In addition to schools, Jingzhou has 176 cultural institutions staffed by 1,168 employees, and 8 public libraries which house 1.382 million books.

== Healthcare ==
As of the end of 2019, Jingzhou has 3,155 medical institutions, staffed by 42,422 employees, and 32,686 hospital beds.

== Transportation ==
=== Railways ===
- Jingzhou Railway Station on the Wuhan-Yichang Railway, with frequent passenger service to Yichang and Wuhan
- Jingmen-Shashi Railway (freight only)
- Jingzhou Shashi Airport in Shashi district

=== Expressways ===
- G50 Shanghai–Chongqing Expressway
- G55 Erenhot–Guangzhou Expressway

=== National highways ===
- China National Highway 207
- China National Highway 318

== Sister cities ==
- Aizuwakamatsu, Fukushima, Japan
- Bila Tserkva, Kyiv Oblast, Ukraine
- Port Chester, New York, United States
- Yanggu County, Gangwon, South Korea

== Notable people ==
- Gao Xiang, (fl. 217–240s) Shu Han military leader
- Yan Zhitui, (531–591) Northern and Southern dynasties period calligrapher, painter, musician, writer, philosopher, and politician
- Wan Exiang, politician and jurist, former chairman of the Revolutionary Committee of the Chinese Kuomintang
- Li Xian, actor
- Qiyu Zhou, Chinese-Canadian female chess grandmaster
- Wang Zhiyi, badminton player
- Chen Long, retired badminton player

== See also ==
- 1954 Yangtze River Floods
