= Cesare Tallone =

Italian painter (1853–1919)

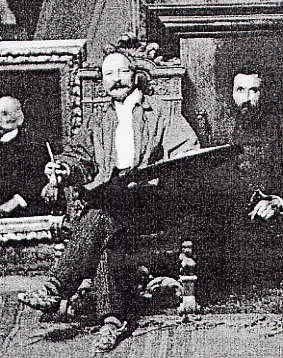
Cesare Tallone, 1900

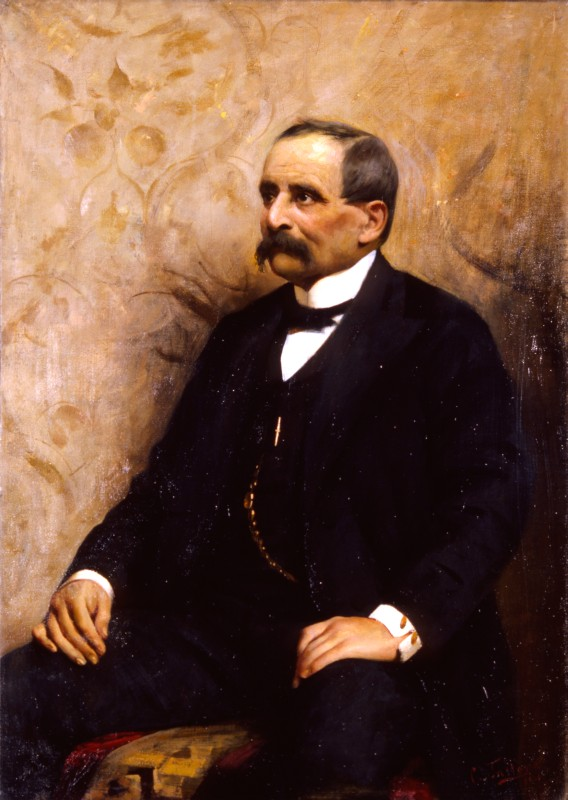
Ritratto del conte Aldo Annoni, 1901 (Fondazione Cariplo)

Cesare Tallone (11 August 1853 – 21 June 1919) was an Italian painter.

== Biography ==
Born in Savona, Italy, and after losing his father at the age of ten, Tallone moved with his mother and sisters to Alessandria, where he became a pupil of the decorative artist Pietro Sassi. Some members of the local bourgeoisie commissioned the first portraits from him and persuaded the City Council to finance his studies. Thanks to this financial aid, Tallone was able to enrol in the Brera Academy in 1872, studying under Raffaele Casnedi, Luigi Riccardi and Giuseppe Bertini until 1880. His talent was obvious from his very first works and was recognised by Francesco Hayez, who allowed him the use of his own studio near the Academy. An active participant in the lively cultural milieu in Milan and member of the Famiglia Artistica since its foundation in 1873 by Vespasiano Bignami.

He won the triennial combined schools of painting competition at the Brera exhibition in 1879, with a historical subject. He reprised this subject for the canvas shown together with the Portrait of Luigi Bernasconi (Rome, Galleria Nazionale d’Arte Moderna) at the "Esposizione di Belle Arti" di Roma in 1883. Tallone often spent time in Rome with Antonio Mancini and Francesco Paolo Michetti. His success with public and critics alike was confirmed the following year at the Esposizione Generale Italiana in Turin. In 1885, he was appointed teacher of painting at the Carrara Academy, in Bergamo, a position which he also held at the Brera Academy from 1899, succeeding Bertini. During these years he continued to exhibit his works and he became known as a portraitist in intellectual, bourgeois and aristocratic circles. One of the last awards he won was the Principe Umberto Prize in 1908, and an entire room was devoted to his works at the Esposizione Internazionale d'Arte di Venezia the same year. He died in Milan. In 1921, on the initiative of his friend Bignami, the Brera Academy commemorated him with a posthumous retrospective.

== Gallery ==
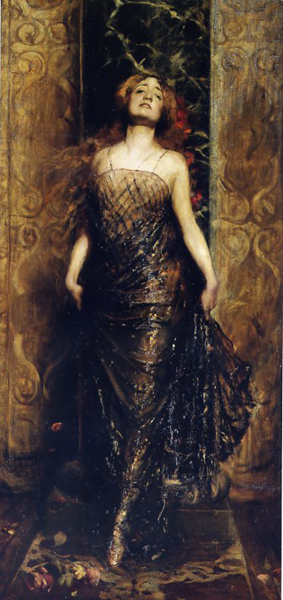
Portrait of Lida Borelli

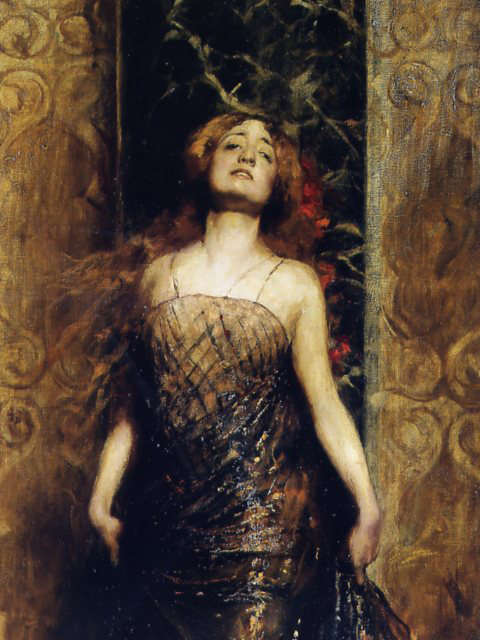
Portrait of Lida Borelli, detail

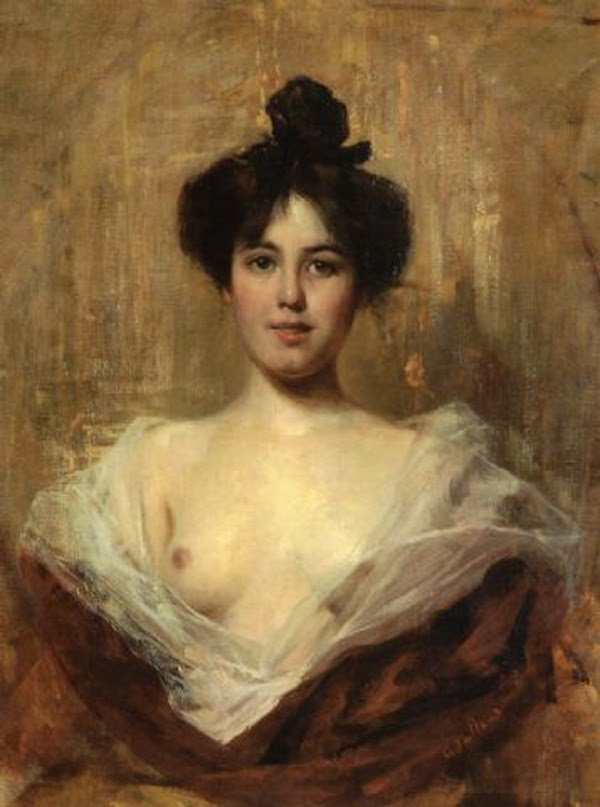
Bust of a young woman

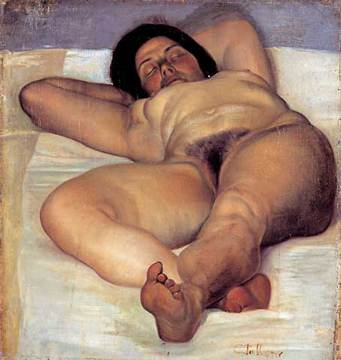
Female nude

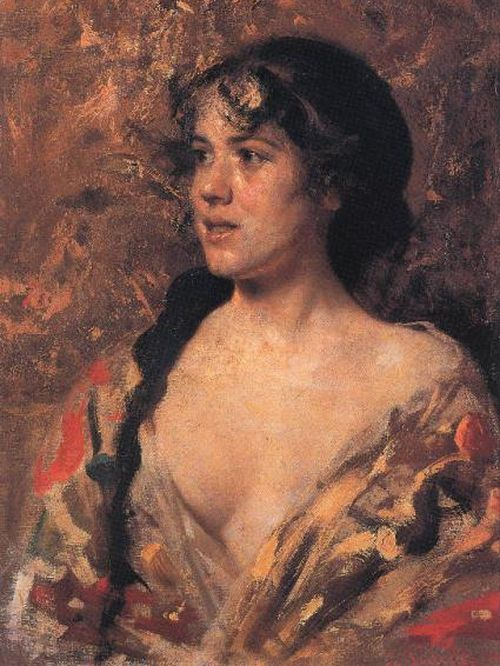
Portrait of a girl

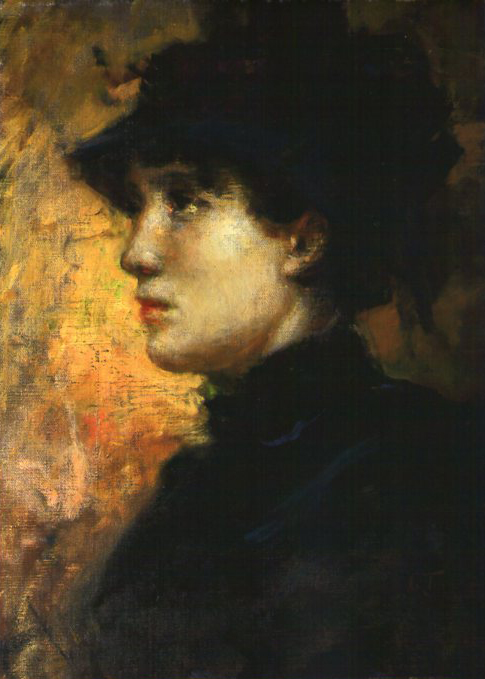
Woman with hat

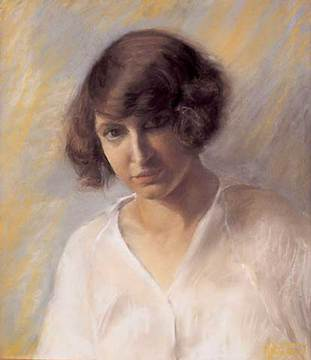
Portrait of a young woman

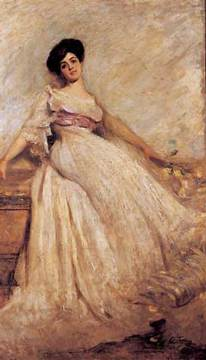
Portrait of Ellade Crespi Colombo

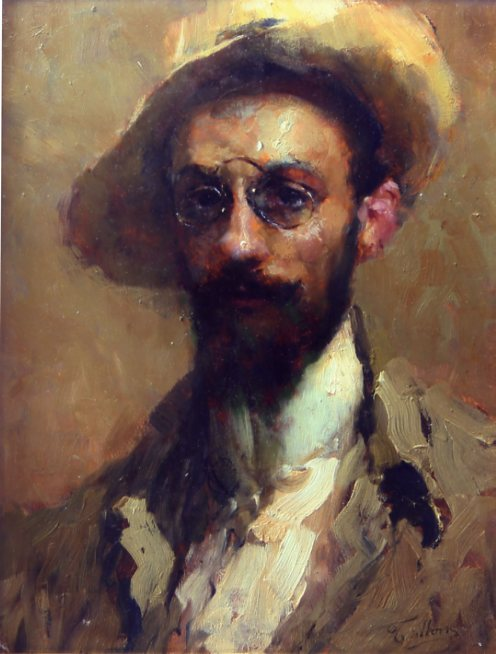
Portrait of a man with hat and glasses

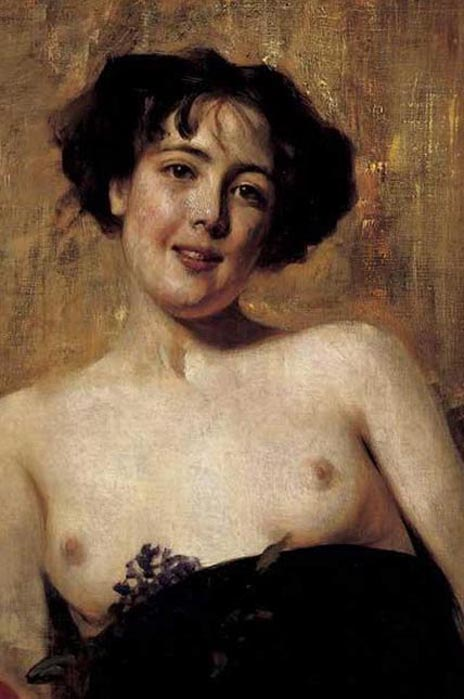
Portrait of a young wife

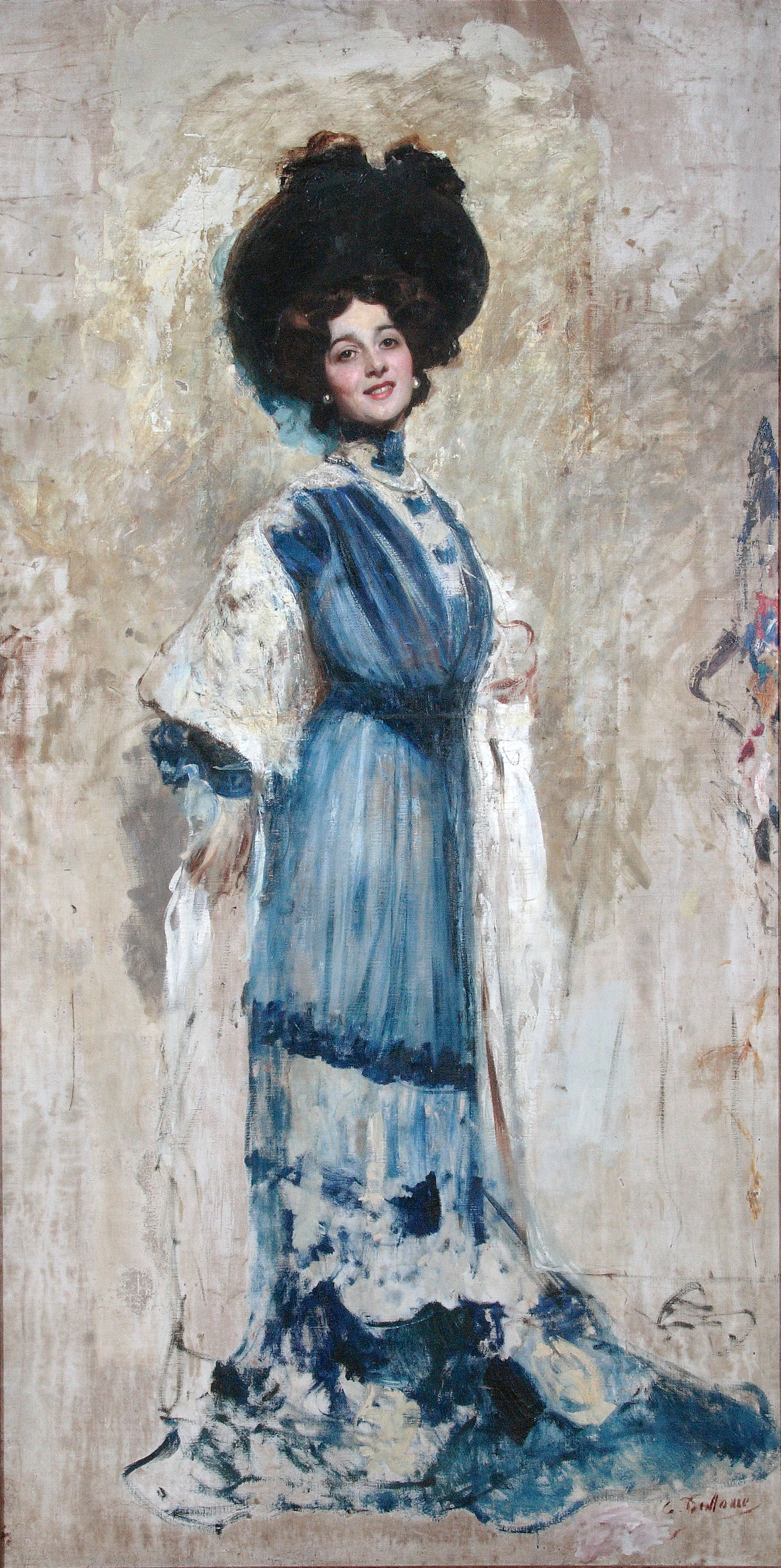
Portrait of Lina Cavalieri

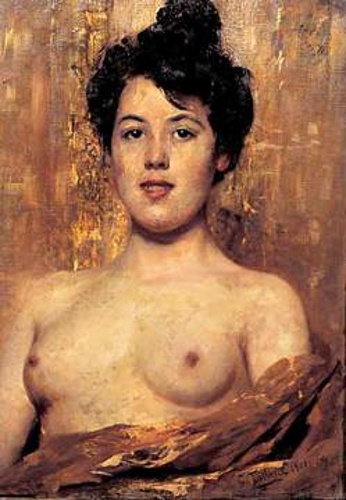
Half-nude woman

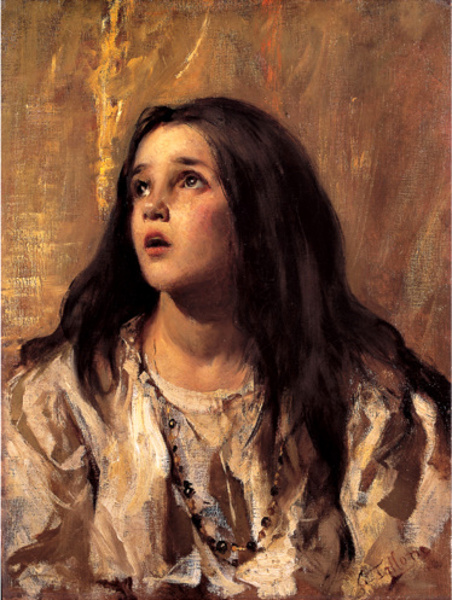
Inspiration of Irene
