= Han Meilin =

Chinese artist (born 1936)

- 韩美林
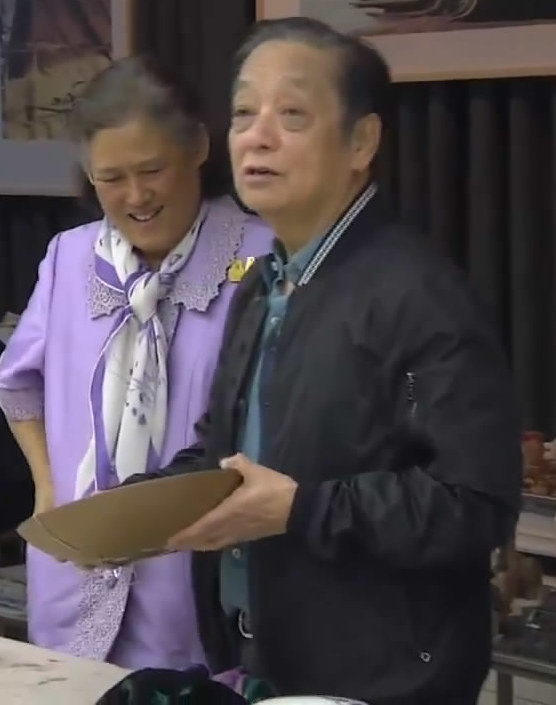
- Han Meilin and Princess Sirindhorn, in 2018.
- Born: December 26, 1936 (age 89); Jinan, Shandong, China
- Website: www.hanmeilin.com

Han Meilin (simplified Chinese: 韩美林; traditional Chinese: 韓美林; pinyin: Hán Měilín; born December 26, 1936, in Jinan, Shandong) is a Chinese artist most recognized today for his creation of the Fuwa dolls for the 2008 Summer Olympics in Beijing.

== Biography ==
In 1955 he was admitted to the Central Academy of arts and design (中央工艺美术学院), now part of Tsinghua University. In 1960 he graduated.

Han is also known to have been tortured in the past. In a 2008 interview, Han admitted his tendon was cut during the Cultural Revolution. His thumbs became useless until later repaired by doctors.

== Career ==
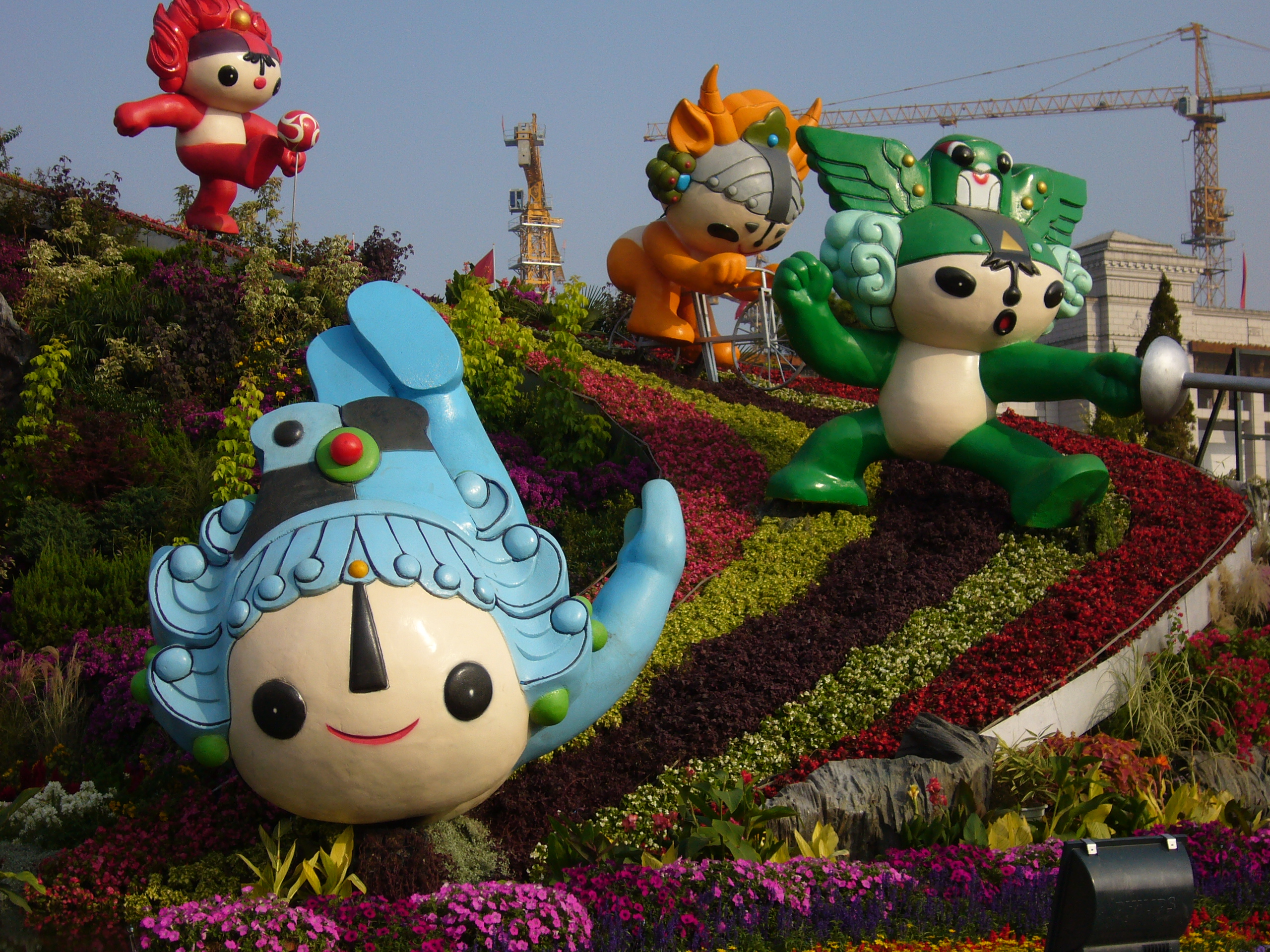
Statues of the Fuwa, mascots designed by Han

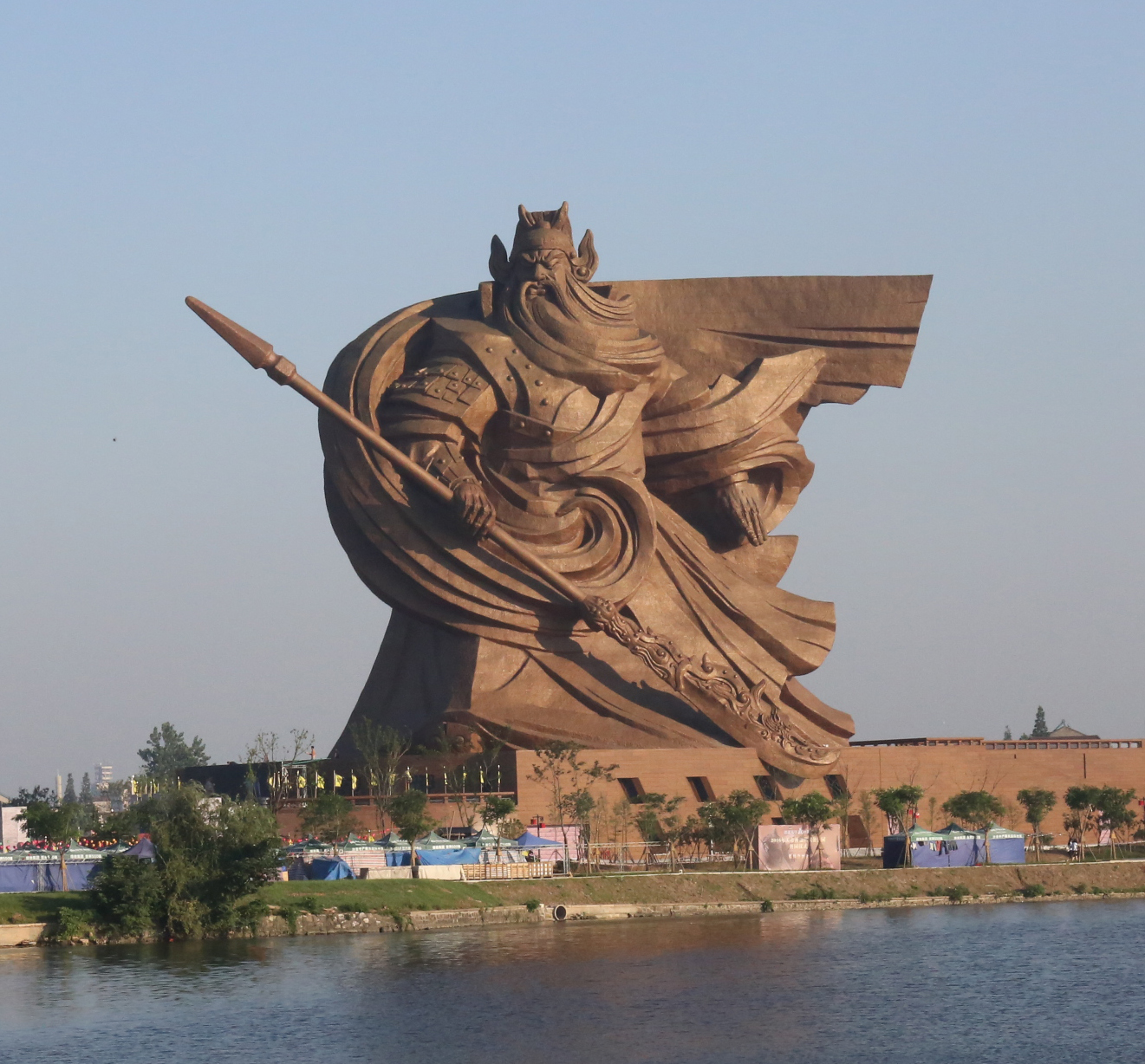
Han was involved in the design of the statue of Guan Yu in Jingzhou.

In 1979, Han was elected to the China Artists Association (中国美术家协会). He has also published influential work such as Baoguo Sanwen (包过散文, Bāoguò Sǎnwén). In 1980, he was in the United States, holding art exhibitions in 21 cities including Boston and New York City. He was given the key to the city of San Diego as an honorary citizen and the city of Manhattan declared October 1, 1980 as Han Meilin Day. In 1983 six of his work were printed on Christmas cards issued by the United Nations. He also gave lectures at Harvard University.

In 1986, he was selected as a delegate to the Sixth National Committee of the Chinese People's Political Consultative Conference (CPPCC). In 1989, he held three art exhibitions at the Crown Art Center in Taipei. From 1991 to 1994 he had solo art shows in Toronto, Ontario, Canada, followed by Malaysia, Hong Kong and India. He spoke at Yale University in 1999. He has also fought the sale of illegal art activities in Beijing, saying most of the paintings sold in auction fairs are not real.

Throughout his career, he has published painting albums as Meilin's Paintings, Art Works of Han Meilin, Mountain Flowers in Full Bloom, Still on the Earth, 100-chicken Paintings, Painting Collection of Han Meilin and Selection of Arts and Crafts Works of Han Meilin. He was once the art designer of paper-cutting cartoons such as Fox Capturing Hunter, Fox Sending Grapes and Hide-and-seek. He also designed the pig postal stamps for China in 1983, panda stamps for 1985 and the phoenix logo for Air China.

He also designed the Five-Dragon Clock Tower sculpture for the 1996 Atlanta Summer Olympics. He also finished the Group Tiger for the city of Dalian in Liaoning Province, No.1 Bull for Jinan and Cock Crows to Herald the Break of Day for Zibo in Shandong Province, Sacred Bull for Shekou, a bronze bull with luminous pearl and the King of Western Chu (Xiang Yu) made of stainless steel for Shenzhen in Guangdong Province. More recently, he designed the 2008 Olympics mascots, the Fuwa, and the symbols that represent each Olympic sport. However, he has since disowned the Fuwa and did not include them in his museum.

On October 15, 2015, at the UNESCO Headquarters, he was named the UNESCO Artist For Peace. "In recognition of his long-term commitment to promoting art and artistic education in China, his support to providing quality education to young people, notably through projects led by the Han Meilin Art Foundation, and his dedication to the ideals and aims of the Organization." He has also announced plans to donate a 7-meter-tall bronze statue entitled Guardian of Peace, to UNESCO on the occasion of the Organization's 70th anniversary.

He was also involved in the design of the colossal statue of Guan Yu in Jingzhou, Hubei.
