= Vespasiano Bignami =

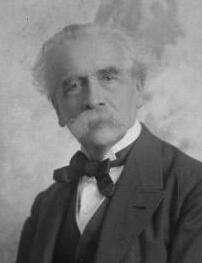
Vespasiano Bignami, photo by Emilio Sommariva

Vespasiano Bignami (1841–1929) was an Italian painter, art critic, and caricaturist. He belonged to the Scapigliatura movement, and helped found La Famiglia Artistica.

== Biography ==
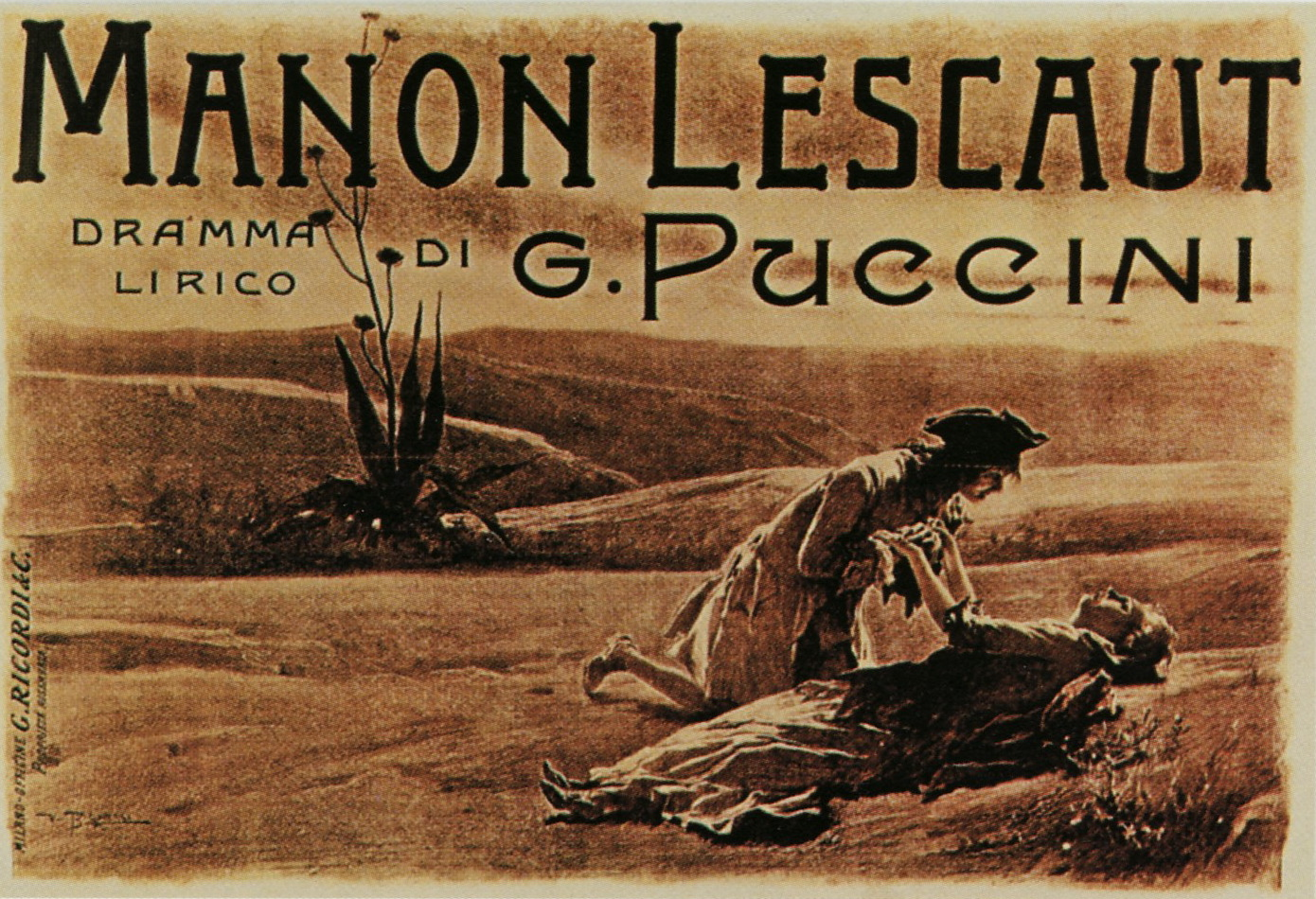
Tinted Postcard (Cartolina) engraved by Bignami for La Scala Performance of Manon Lescaut

He was born in Cremona, then in the Austrian Empire. Apprenticed to a seller of colored postcards at the age of eight, he spent some time at the Accademia Carrara of Bergamo under Enrico Scuri. In Bergamo, poor, and needing to scramble to make ends meet, he "painted thank-you notes with water-colors; penciled a theater curtain (sipario) for an amateur group; made small paintings of acrobats; made signs for inns and businesses; painted hundreds of cherubs on the wallpaper of a church; made a painted canvas organ cover depicting a twice life-size figure of Saint Cecilia; painted wooden church sculptures, painted glass for Magic lantern projectors, and made many cartoons for frescoes and paintings by classmates". In 1861, he moved to Milan, and made cartoons for the satirical and patriotic L'Uomo di Pietra (referring to Scior Carera). He also illustrated books and journals, and produced industrial art.

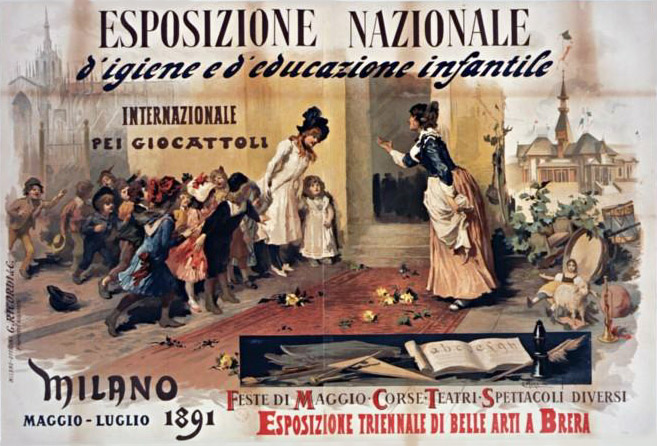
Postcard by Bignami for 1891 Brera Exposition

In 1869, he exhibited at the Brera a painting titled Botanical Lesson, which won the Mylius Prize. In an exhibition at Brussels, he exhibited Condemned to Death, which depicts a panic-stricken chicken flapping its wings, beak open, looking in vain for an escape from its fate in a kitchen. He also frescoed houses including the ceilings of the villa in Nizza of architect Maraini (destroyed in fire, 1874). In 1879, he painted Four Evangelists for the church of Rosazza Biellese. In 1881, he exhibited a painting titled Un Trivio in the Academy Exhibition of Milan.

In 1873, he helped found the Famiglia Artistica of Milan, which still serves as an association for artists. He was a friend to many artists and helped write biographies of Francesco Barzaghi and Cesare Tallone. He taught at the Accademia di Brera. He was a member of the city council and a director of the Galleria d’Arte Moderna of Milan. He traveled to work in San José, Costa Rica. He died in Milan in 1929.

The art critic Carlo Bozzi helped organize Bignami's notes and papers and donated them to the city of Milan, where they are now represented by the Vespasiano Bignami Collection.
