= Sonoran Arthropod Studies Institute =

Environmental organization in Arizona

- Abbreviation: SASI
- Formation: 1986
- Type: 501(c)(3) Non-profit corporation
- Purpose: Education
- Location: Tucson, Arizona
- Region served: Tucson metropolitan area
- Website: https://web.archive.org/web/20130722171719/http://www.sasionline.org/

The Sonoran Arthropod Studies Institute (established in 1986) is a non-profit organization, located in the Sonoran Desert in Tucson, Arizona, whose mission is to educate the public about arthropods. The Institute routinely conducts field trips and educational visits, as well as maintains a collection of living and preserved arthropods. The Sonoran Arthropod Studies Institute has a membership of about 600. Since 1993, the Sonoran Arthropod Studies Institute has hosted the annual Invertebrates In Education and Conservation Conference in Rio Rico, Arizona. The Institute hosted the first annual Medical Entomology Today! conference in Tucson in 2011.
