= Shashi, Jingzhou =

Shashi 沙市区 Shasi
- District
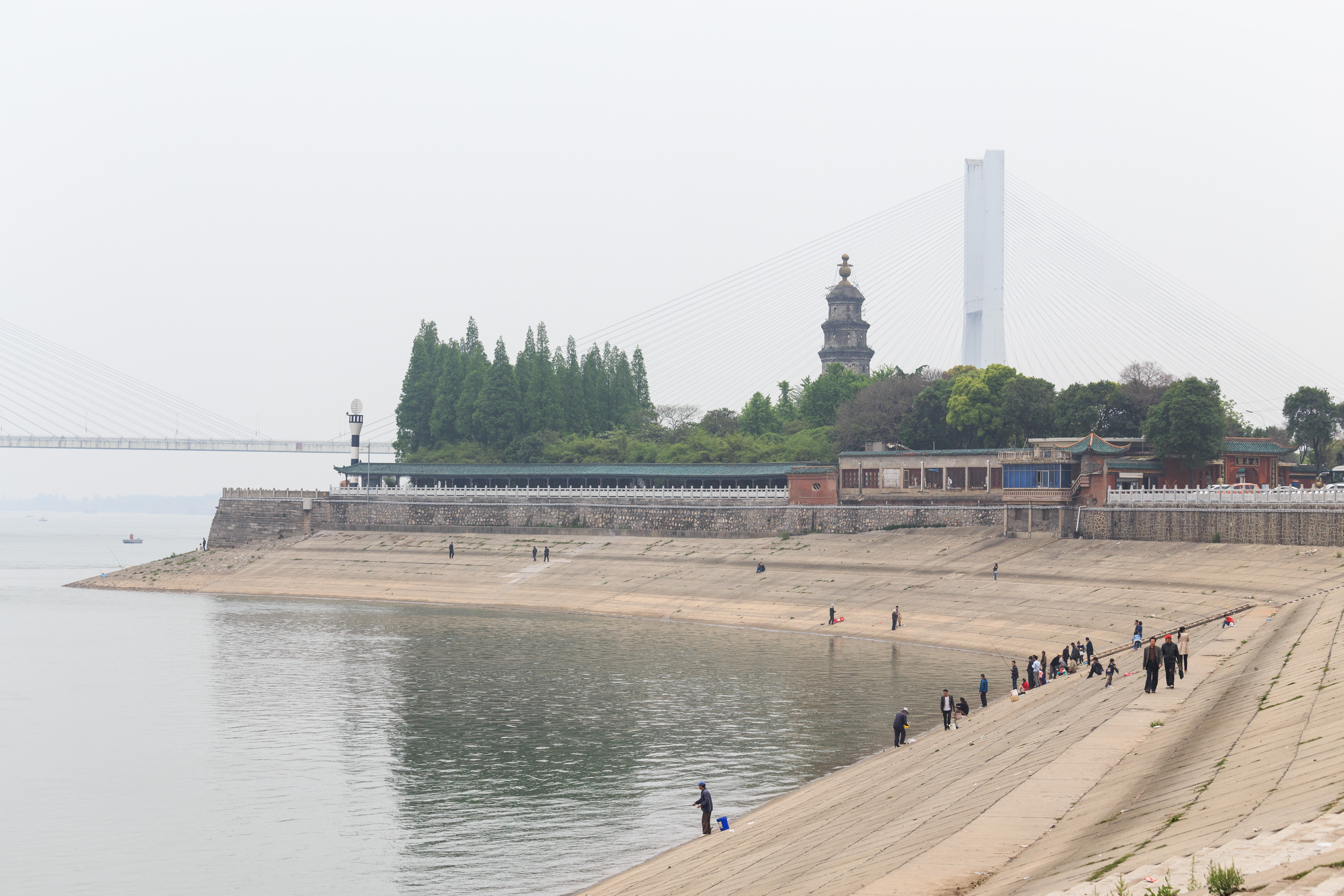
- Jingzhou Wanshou Pagoda

- Location in Hubei
- Coordinates (Shashi Zhongshan Park (沙市市中山公园)): 30°18′58″N 112°15′07″E
- Country: China
- Province: Hubei
- Prefecture-level city: Jingzhou
- District seat: Chongwen Subdistrict

Area
  - Total: 522.75 km^{2} (201.83 sq mi)

Population (2020 census)
  - Total: 563,398
  - Density: 1,077.8/km^{2} (2,791.4/sq mi)
- Time zone: UTC+8 (China Standard)
- Website: www.shashi.gov.cn

See Shashi for namesakes

Shashi (Chinese: 沙市; pinyin: Shāshì) is a district within the main urban area of Jingzhou, Hubei province, China. It is located on the left (northern) bank of the Yangtze River, between Yichang and Wuhan.

== History ==
Shashi was founded during the Warring States period as an extension of the Chu capital Ying, its port on the Yangtze.

In modern history it is notable as one of the four ports specified to be opened to the Empire of Japan in the Treaty of Shimonoseki (17 April 1895, which also ended Chinese imperial claims to Korea). The treaty port grew rapidly into because of this, gaining the moniker of "Little Hankow". Nonetheless, the opening of other coastal ports led to trade moving elsewhere and it gradually declined.

In 1994 it lost its status as a city and was combined with Jingzhou to form Jingsha city.

== Administrative divisions ==
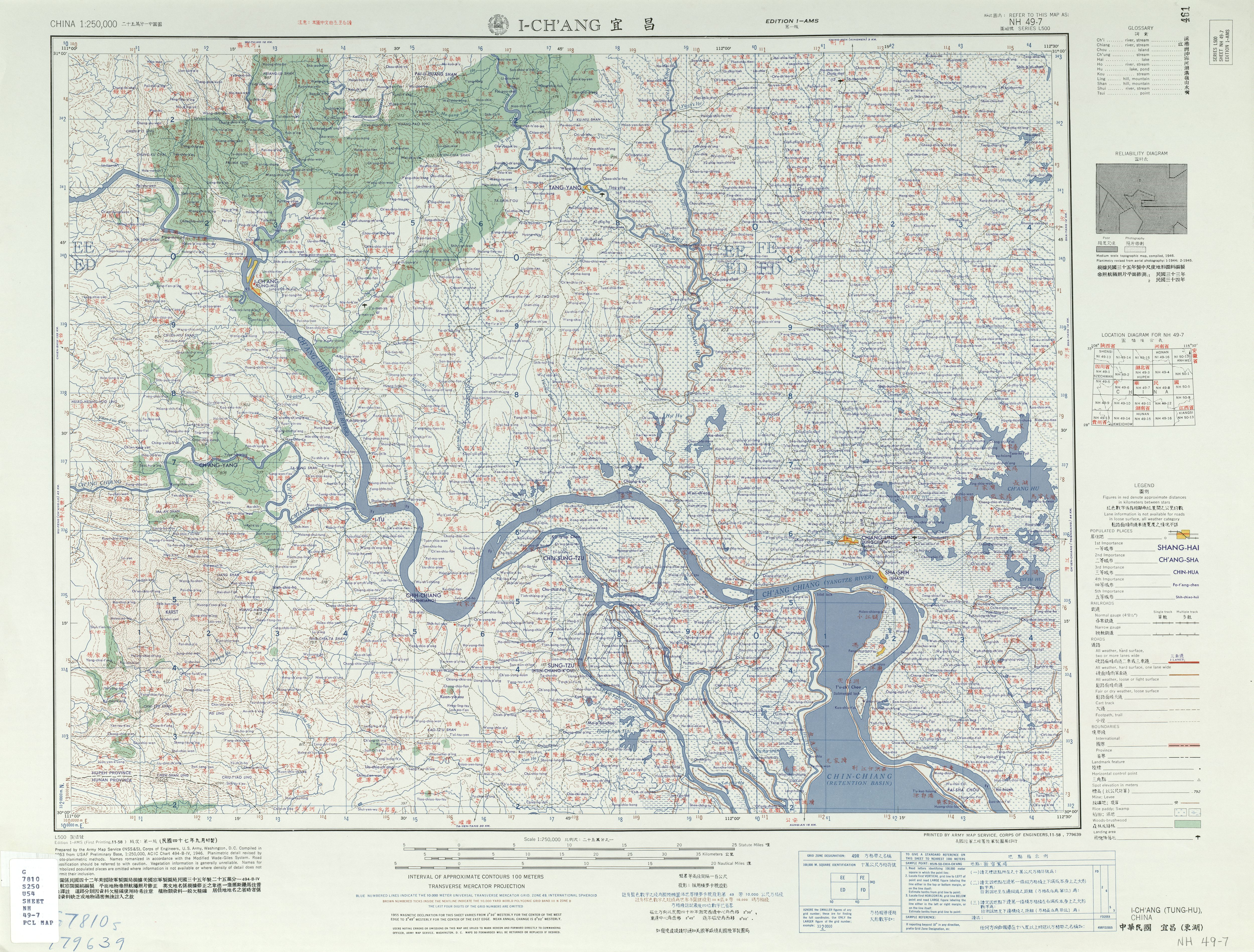
Map including Shashi (labeled as SHA-SHIH (SHASI) 沙市) (1953)

Shashi District administers 6 subdistricts and 4 towns:

Subdistricts

- Zhongshan Subdistrict (中山街道/中山路街道)
- Chongwen Subdistrict (崇文街道/崇文街街道)
- Jiefang Subdistrict (解放街道/解放路街道)
- Shengli Subdistrict (胜利街道/胜利街街道)
- Chaoyang Subdistrict (朝阳街道/朝阳路街道) (formerly: Lianhe Subdistrict (联合街道))
- Lixin Subdistrict (立新街道)

Towns

- Luochang (锣场镇)
- Cenhe (岑河镇)
- Guanyindang (观音垱镇)
- Guanju (关沮镇)

== Ecclesiastical history ==
The Roman Catholic Apostolic Prefecture of Shashi or Shasi / Shasien(sis) (Latin adjective) was established on 7 July 1936, on territory split off from the then Apostolic Vicariate of Yichang (now a diocese), bordering on that, on the dioceses Hanyang and Puqi and on the Apostolic prefecture of Lixian.

It is a (dormant?) pre-diocesan Latin jurisdiction, which is exempt, i.e. directly subject to the Holy See and it missionary Roman Congregation for the Evangelization of Peoples, not part of any ecclesiastical province. No statistics available.

It is indefinitely vacant, without Apostolic administrator, since the death of its sole incumbent as Apostolic Prefect of Shashi :

- Father Julian Edward Dillon (狄隆), Friars Minor (O.F.M.) (born USA) (1936.07.11 – death 1961.06.25).

== See also ==
- List of Catholic dioceses in China

== Sources and external links ==
- Official website of Shashi District government
- GCatholic
