= SASI (software) =

Student information system software

SASI (Schools Administrative Student Information)
- Developer: NCS Pearson / Pearson School Systems
- Type: Student information system

SASI (Schools Administrative Student Information) or SASI Student Information System was a computer program developed by Jerry D. Lloyd of Educational Timesharing Systems, who was acquired by National Computer Systems (NCS) and NCS was acquired by Pearson in 1997. The cross-platform system provides administrators and educators with access to student demographics, attendance, schedules, discipline, grades, extended test histories, and state reporting codes. Features of SASI include SASIxp, InteGrade Pro, classroomXP, and Parent Access. In 2003, more than 16,000 schools nationwide used the software.

It was classified as end of life in 2011 by Pearson.

== History ==
Pearson acquired National Computer Systems (NCS) in 2000. In 2006, Pearson announced the acquisition of Apple's PowerSchool student information systems division.

== Migration to PowerSchool ==
In 2008, THE Journal reported that Pearson would offer a free PowerSchool Premier license to existing SASI customers and planned to migrate schools from the SASI platform to PowerSchool Premier over the following two years.
