= Statue of Guan Yu =

Monumental statue formerly in Jingzhou, China

- 关公义园
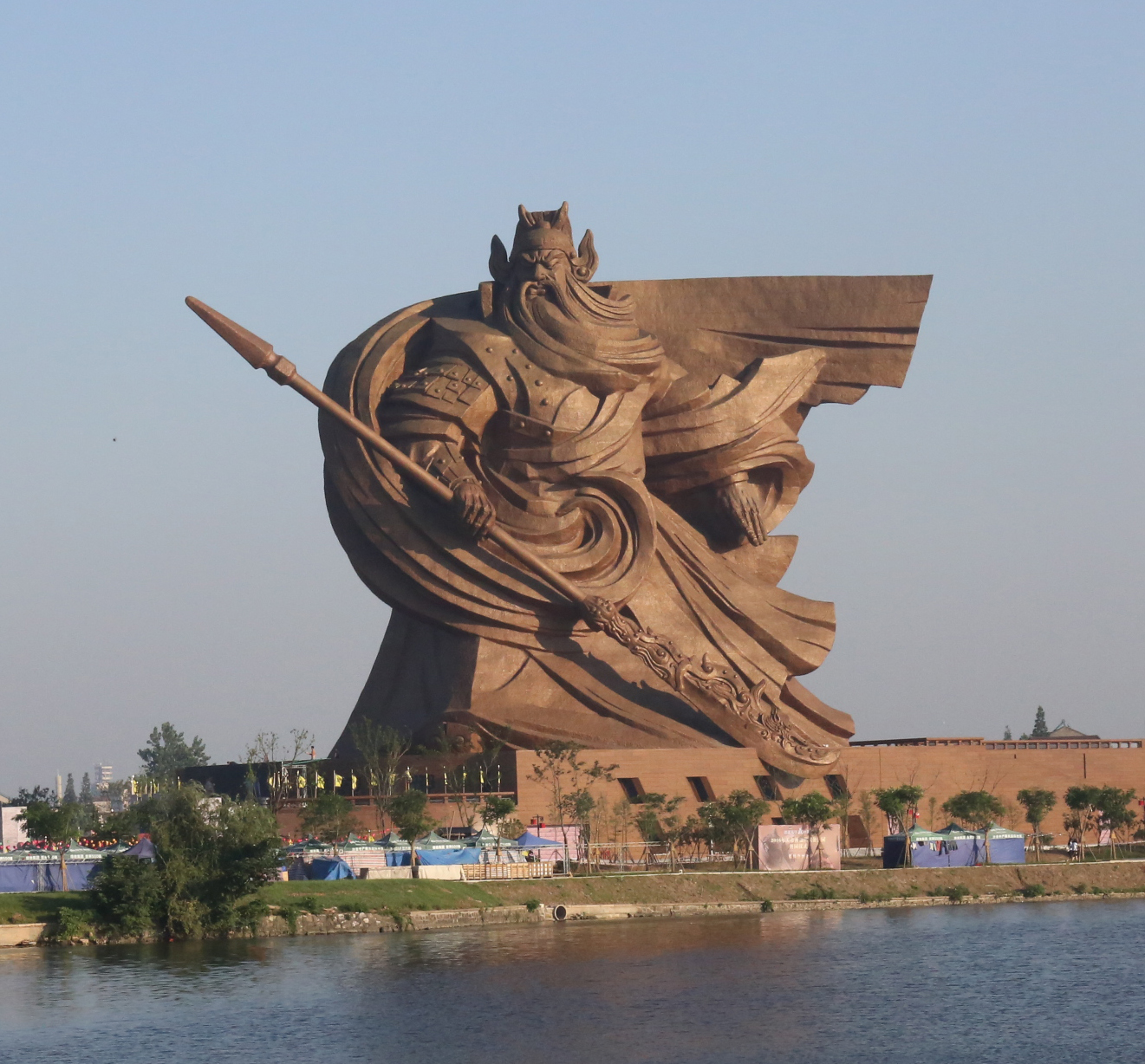
- The statue as it stood in 2016
- Interactive map of Statue of Guan Yu
- Location: Jingzhou, Hubei, People's Republic of China
- Coordinates: 30°20′31″N 112°12′28″E
- Designer: Han Meilin
- Material: Steel framing, reinforced by concrete, bronze strips
- Height: 58 metres (190 ft)
- Weight: 1197 tonnes
- Visitors: 220,000 (in 2018)
- Beginning date: 2013
- Completion date: 17 June 2016
- Dedicated to: Guan Yu

The Guan Yu Statue was a large monument to deified Chinese military general Guan Yu that formerly stood in Jingzhou, China. The statue was completed in 2016 but was dismantled in 2022, pending reconstruction in another location.

== Background ==
Guan Yu was a Chinese military general serving under the warlord Liu Bei during the late Eastern Han dynasty. His life was lionised and his achievements glorified to such an extent after his death in 220 that he was deified during the Sui dynasty. Through generations of storytelling, culminating in the 14th-century historical novel Romance of the Three Kingdoms, his deeds and moral qualities have been given immense emphasis, making Guan Yu one of East Asia's most popular paradigms of loyalty and righteousness. He is still worshipped today as a bodhisattva in Buddhist tradition and as a guardian deity in Chinese folk religion and Taoism. He is also held in high esteem in Confucianism.

== Description ==
The statue was designed by Han Meilin. Construction finished in 2016. It stood at 58 metres tall, weighed 1,197 tonnes, and was made of around 4,000 bronze strips. The project began in 2013, when Han Meilin visited Jingzhou for inspiration. Han personally oversaw the designing and installing of the statue.

Guan Yu was depicted wearing his traditional robes and cloak and wielding his famous guandao, the Green Dragon Crescent Blade, which weighed 123 tonnes. The figure stood atop a 10-metre pedestal resembling an ancient Chinese warship. Inside the base was a 7,710 square-metre museum and shrine to Guan Yu.

The project, which cost 1.5 billion yuan, was officially opened to the public on June 17, 2016. The unveiling was accompanied by worship and festivities. Han Meilin was present for the ceremony.

== Relocation ==
In September 2020, the Ministry of Housing and Urban-Rural Development criticized the Guan Yu statue as "vain and wasteful", stating that its towering presence in the skyline "ruined the character and culture of Jingzhou as a historic city" and calling for rectification. An investigation by the state broadcaster China Central Television revealed that the project's developers only had permission to build the pedestal of the statue (the museum). The developers, treating the statue as a piece of art, claimed to be unaware that large statues required their own planning processes, nor were they aware that the statue's current location had a height limit of 15 metres. Additionally, land under the statue started to sink under its weight.

In response to the central government order, Jingzhou city officials announced in October 2020 that the statue would be relocated. The new location of the statue will be 8 km away in Dianjiangtai, where Guan Yu is said to have drilled his troops. The cost of the relocation is estimated at 155 million yuan.

The dismantling of the statue began in September 2021 and was complete by the first half of 2022. The museum closed its doors to the public and has no plans of reopening in the short term. Construction of the statue at the new site has yet to begin as of April 2023.

== See also ==
- List of tallest statues
