= Pietro Sassi =

Italian painter (1834–1905)

Pietro Sassi (18 July 1834 – 30 December 1905) was an Italian painter who specialized in large scale vedute of Rome and the Roman Campagna.

He was born in Alessandria and resident in Rome, where he painted genre and both urban and rural vedute paintings. Le Sponde del Lago di Garda in Tirolo was exhibited at the 1880 Exhibition of Fine Arts in Turin, while two landscapes where exhibited in the next year in Milan. In 1883 he found great success in Rome where he exhibited three large scale views of ‘La Campaña Romana’, 'Il Temporale in Mare’, and ‘Il Mare del Nord’ in addition to twelve other paintings including Un Bosco di Querce negli Appennini Romani and The Arch of Septimus Severus in the Roman Forum.

At the 1884 Exposition of Turin two of his Roman vedute, Un Bosco di Querei Negli Appennini Romani and L’Arco di Settimio Severo del Foro Romano, garnered great praise; and at the Venice National Artistic Exhibition in 1887 he exhibited another three paintings: Uva Fresca, Uva Appassita and Una Foresta.

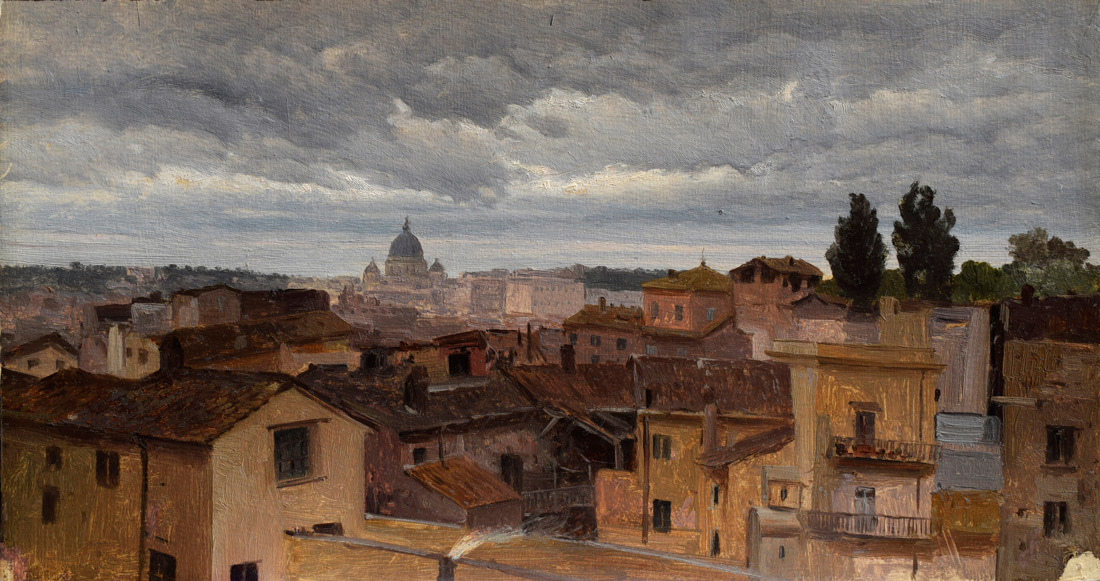
Rome from my Little Terrace

Sassi's patrons included a number of wealthy patrician families of Rome and Genoa including the Cavasanti's, Dossena's and Brignole's. Among his pupils was Cesare Tallone. Sassi died in Rome in 1905.

The English author and art critic Brian Sewell was an admirer of Sassi, whose 1889 painting The Arch of Titus formed part of his famous collection.

== Gallery ==
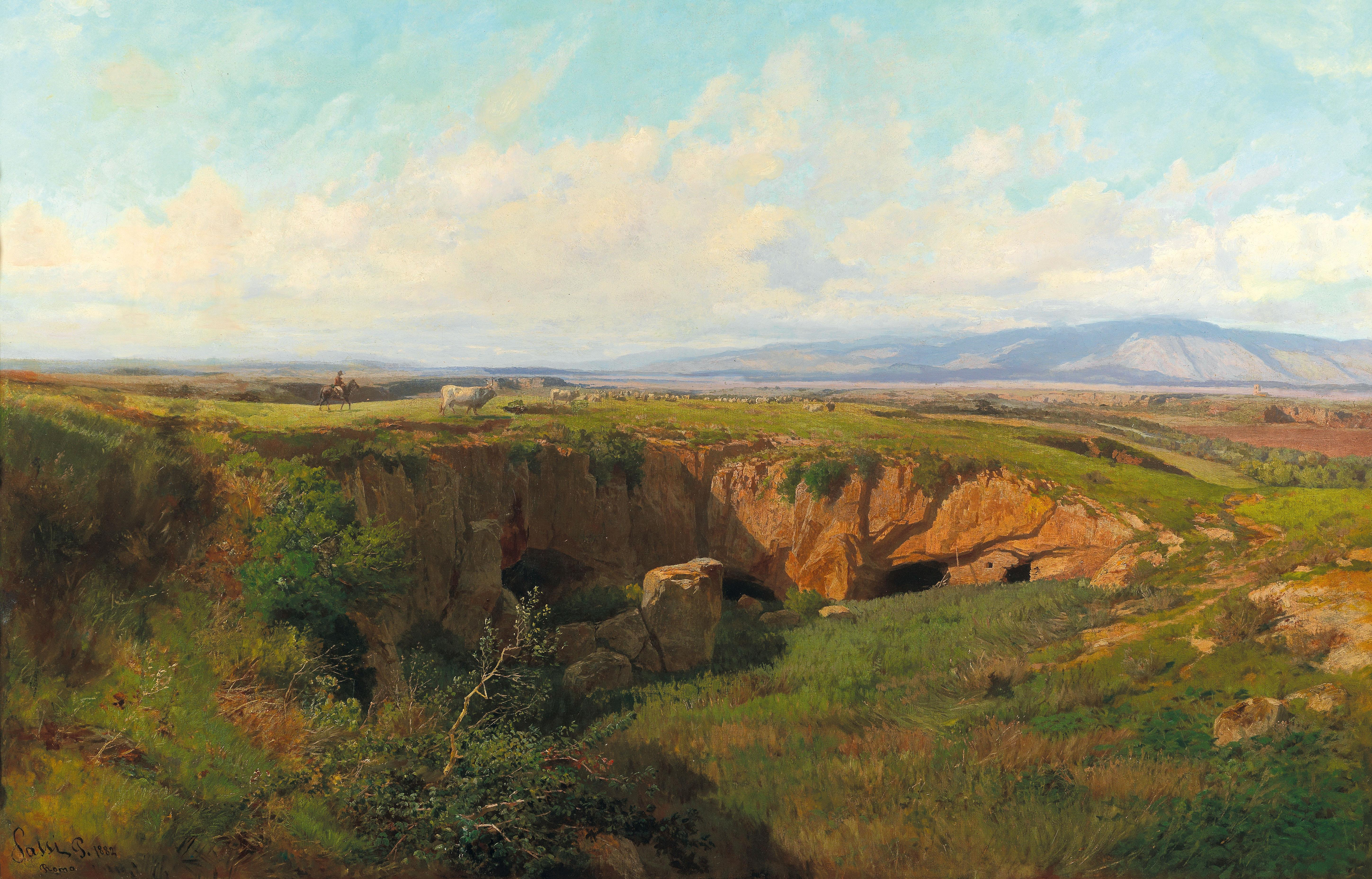
Roman Campagna Landscape with Shepherd

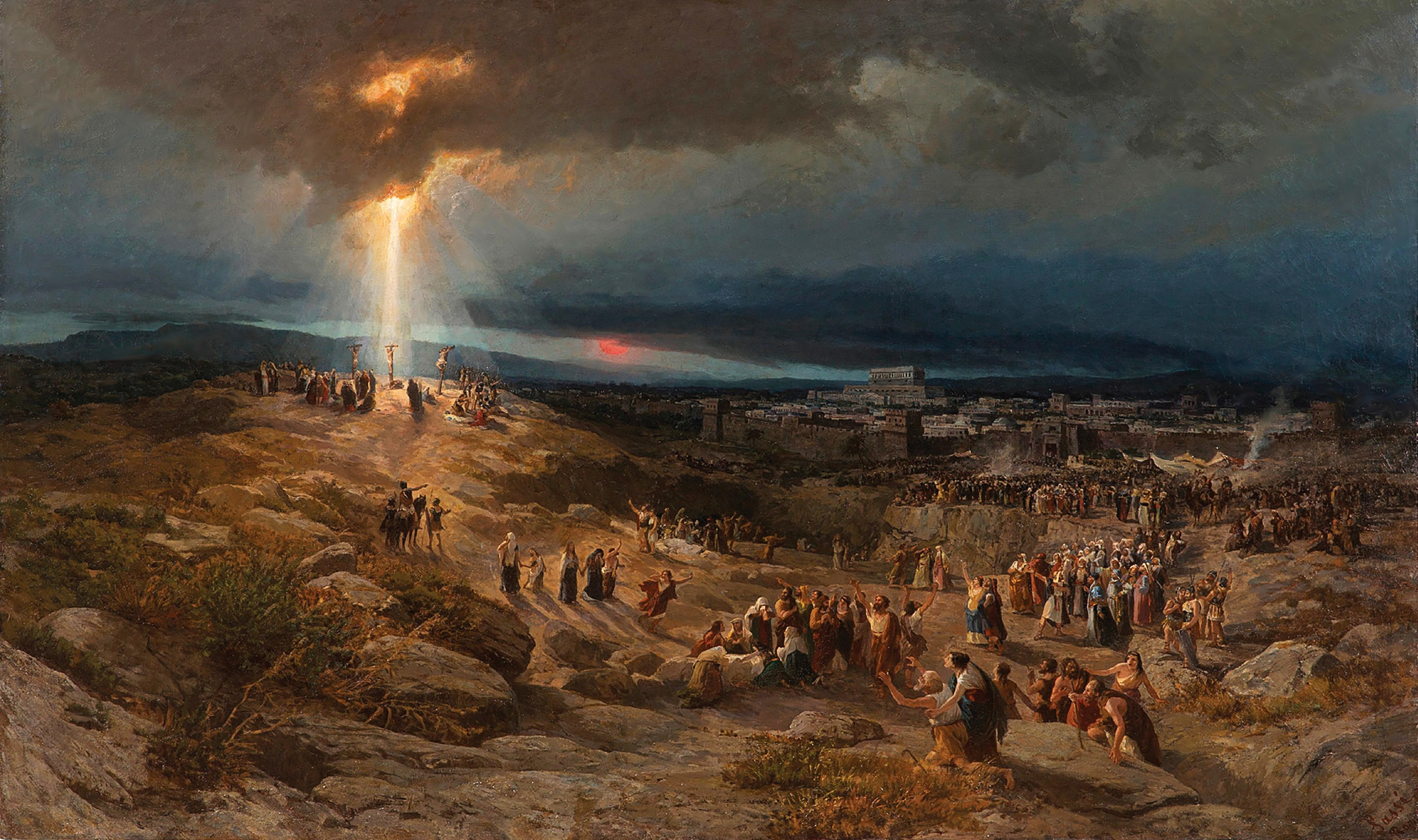
Calvary

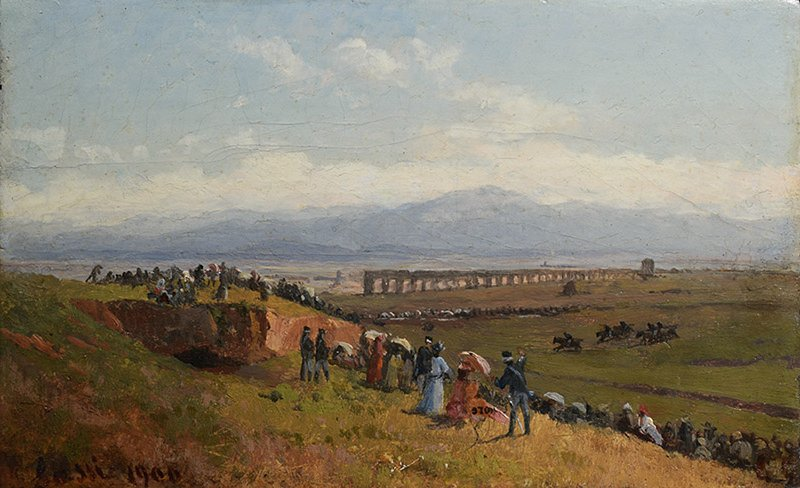
At the Capannelle Racecourse

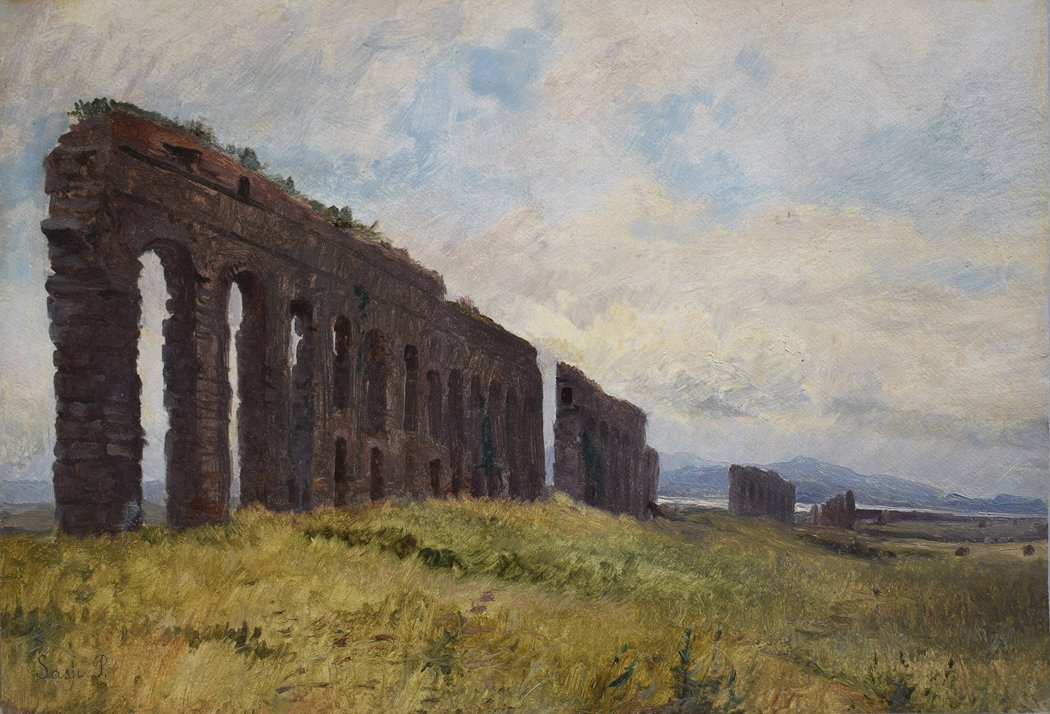
Acquedotto Claudio in the Roman Countryside

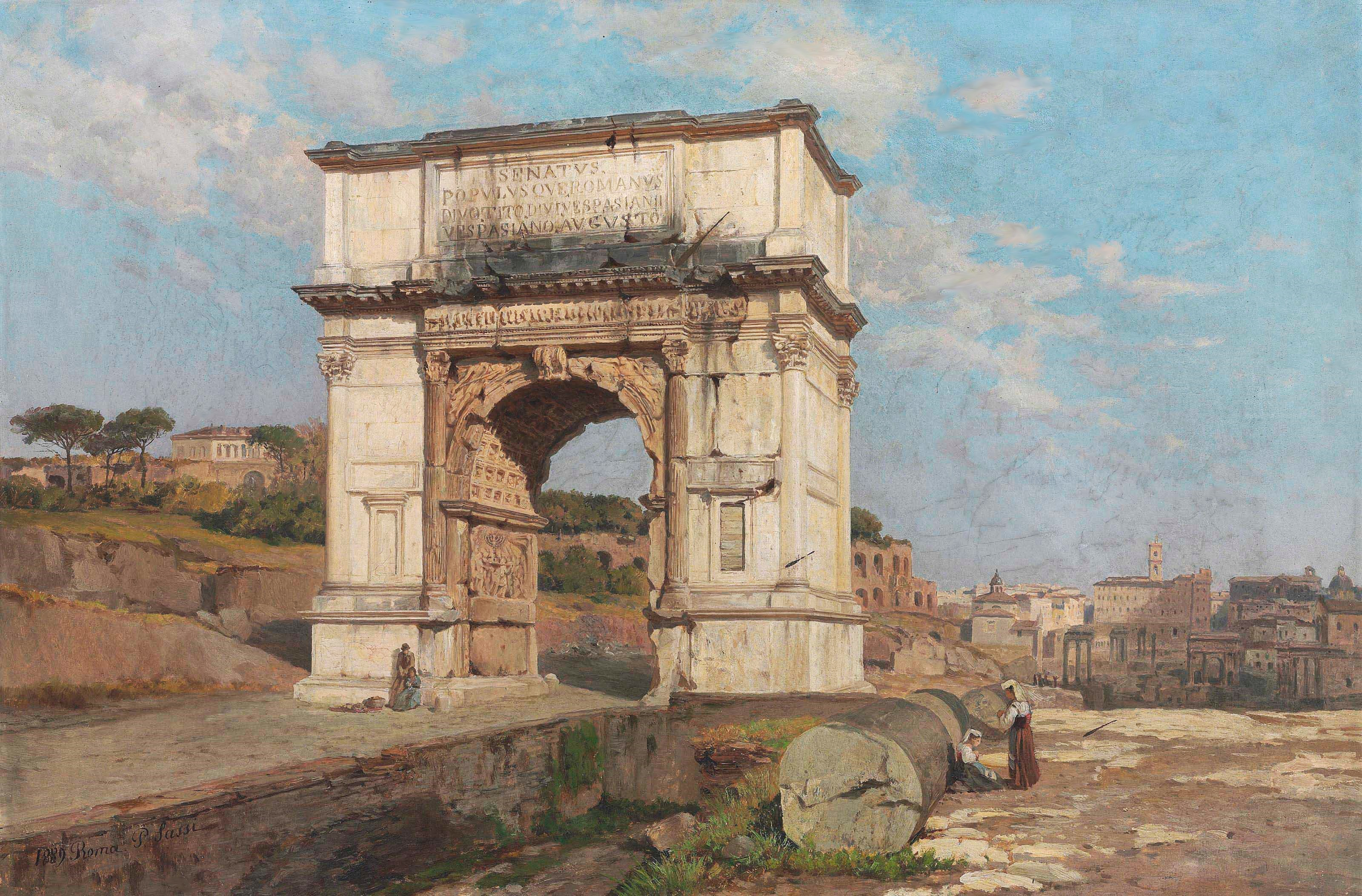
The Arch of Titus
