= List of predecessors of sovereign states in Asia =

The boundaries of Asia are culturally determined, as there is no clear geographical separation between it and Europe, which together form one continuous landmass called Eurasia. The most commonly accepted boundaries place Asia to the east of the Suez Canal, the Ural River, and the Ural Mountains, and south of the Caucasus Mountains and the Caspian and Black Seas.

Sovereign state	Predecessors
Afghanistan	Bactria (2200–549 BC); Part of Median Kingdom/Empire (678–549 BC); Part of the Achaemenid Empire (549–330 BC); Kingdom of Kapisa (5th century BC – 7th century); Part of Macedonian Empire (549–256 BC); Greco-Bactrian Kingdom (256–150 BC); Part of Indo-Parthian Kingdom and the Indo-Scythians (150 BC – 30 AD); Kushan Empire (30–320); Kidarite Kingdom (320–500); Alchon Huns Monarchy (380–560); Kingdom of Rob; Hephtalite Monarchy (410–557); Nezak Hun Kingdom (484–711); Part of Sasanian Empire (500–661); Part of Umayyad Caliphate (661–750); Part of Abbasid Caliphate (750–821); Farighunids (9th century–1010); Part of Tahirid Emirate (821–873); Saffarid Emirate (873–1003); Ghurid Sultanate (c. 879 – 1215); Ghaznavid Sultanate (1003–1163); Nasrid dynasty of Sistan (1029–1225); Part of the Khwarazmian Empire (1163–1231); Part of the Mongol Empire (1231–1369); Kart dynasty (1244–1381); Timurid Empire (1369–1506); Part of the Khanate of Bukhara (1506–1709); Hotak Emirate (1709–1738); Part of the Afsharid Iran (1738–1796); Durrani Empire (1747–1826, also called the Sadozai Kingdom and the Afghan Empire); Emirate of Afghanistan (1823–1926); Kingdom of Afghanistan (1926–1973); Republic of Afghanistan (1973–1978); Democratic Republic of Afghanistan (1978–1992, renamed Republic of Afghanistan in 1987); Islamic State of Afghanistan (1992–2002) and Islamic Emirate of Afghanistan (1996–2001); Transitional Islamic State of Afghanistan (2002–2004); Islamic Republic of Afghanistan (2004–2021, internationally recognized UN member state); Islamic Emirate of Afghanistan (2021–present, unrecognized government)
Armenia	Hayasa-Azzi Confederation (1500–1290 BC); Kingdom of Arme-Shupria (1300–1190 BC); Nairi Confederation (1114–860 BC); Kingdom of Ararat (860–590 BC); Part of the Median Empire (553–549); Satrapy of Armenia, part of the Achaemenid Empire (549–330 BC); Kingdom of Armenia (321 BC – 114 AD); Armenia, province of the Roman Empire (114–118); Kingdom of Armenia (118–428); Divided between the Byzantine Empire on the west, and the east by the Sasanian Empire (428–654); Emirate of Arminiya (also known as Ostikanate of Arminiya), province (largely autonomous vassal principalities) of the Umayyad and Abbasid Caliphates (654–884); Kaysite dynasty (860–964); Bragatid Kingdom of Armenia (883–1045); Kingdom of Tashir-Dzoraget (979–1118); Kingdom of Vaspurakan (908–1021); Kingdom of Syunik (987–1170); Part of the Byzantine Empire (1045–1071); Part of the Great Seljuk Sultanate (1071–1194); Zakarid Principality of Armenia (1201–1360); Part of the Mongol Empire as its territory (1243–1256); Part of the Ilkhanate (1256–1336); Part of the Chobanid Kingdom (1336–1357); Part of the Kara Koyunlu (1357–1468); Part of the Safavid Empire (1501–1578); Part of the Ottoman Empire (1578–1603); Part of the Safavid Empire (1603–1724); Divided between the Ottoman Empire and the Russian Empire (1724–1730); Part of the Safavid Empire (1730–1736); Part of the Afsharid Iran (1736–1747); Khanates of the Caucasus (1747–1827); Part of the Russian Empire (1828–1917); Transcaucasian Democratic Federative Republic (1918); First Republic of Armenia (1918–1920); Armenian Soviet Socialist Republic (1920–1922); Federative Union of Socialist Soviet Republics of Transcaucasia (1922–1936), federated state of the Soviet Union; Armenian Soviet Socialist Republic (1936–1990), federated state of the Soviet Union; Republic of Armenia (1991–present), federated state of the Soviet Union to 1991
Azerbaijan	Part of Scythian Kingdom (652–625 BC); Part of Achaemenid Empire (550–330 BC) Caucasian Albania (c. 100s BC – 730 AD); Part of the Khazar Khaganate (730–861); Kingdom of Shirvan (861–1538); Ruled by the Sajid dynasty (889–929); Part of the Sallarid Kingdom (919–1062); Shaddadids (951–1199); Part of the Rawadid Emirate (955–1071); Hasanwayhid dynasty (959–1015); Part of the Great Seljuk Sultanate; Part of the Kingdom of Georgia (1130–1238); Atabegs of Azerbaijan (1091–1225); Ahmadilis (1122–1225); Part of the Khwarazmian Kingdom/Sultanate (1225–1231); Part of the Mongol Empire (1231–1256); Part of the Ilkhanate (1256–1336); Part of the Chobanid Kingdom (1336–1357); Part of the Kara Koyunlu (1357–1468); Part of the Aq Qoyunlu (1468–1501); Part of the Safavid Empire (1501–1578); Part of the Ottoman Empire (1578–1603) Elisu Sultanate (1604–1844); Part of the Safavid Empire (1578–1723); Divided between the Ottoman Empire and the Russian Empire (1724–1730); Part of the Safavid Empire (1730–1736); Part of the Afsharid Iran (1736–1747); Khanates of the Caucasus (1747–1801); Part of the Qajar Empire (1796–1813); Part of the Russian Empire (1805–1917); Transcaucasian Democratic Federative Republic (1918); Azerbaijan Democratic Republic (1918–1920); Azerbaijan Soviet Socialist Republic (1920–1922); Federative Union of Socialist Soviet Republics of Transcaucasia (1922–1936), federated state of the Soviet Union; Azerbaijan Soviet Socialist Republic (1936–1991), federated state of the Soviet Union; Republic of Azerbaijan (1991–present) Nagorno-Karabakh Autonomous Oblast (1923–1991); Nagorno-Karabakh Republic (1991–2017); Republic of Artsakh (2017–2023)
Bahrain	Dilmun civilization (4th millennium BC – 6th century BC); Part of the Achaemenid Empire (6th century BC – 3rd century BC); Part of the Parthian Empire (130 BC – 3rd century BC); Part of the Sassanid Empire (3rd century AD – 899); Part of the Qarmatian Republic (899–976); Part of the Abbasid Caliphate (976–1076); Part of the Uyunid Emirate (1076–1235); Kingdom of Ormus (1200s – 1622); Ruled by the Usfurid dynasty (1253 – mid-1400s); Ruled by the Jarwanid dynasty (1300s–1400s); Part of the Jabrid Emirate (mid-1400s – 1521); Part of the Portuguese Empire (1521–1602); Part of the Safavid Empire (1602–1717); Part of the Omani Empire (1717–1783); In union with other states in the Bani Utbah Confederation (1783–1861); Sheikhdom of Bahrain and its Dependencies (1783–1971), part of the Trucial States (1820–1971) under British protection, being part of the British Empire; State of Bahrain (1971–2002); Kingdom of Bahrain (2002–present)
Bangladesh	Pundravardhana (1280–345 BC); Vanga Kingdom (1100–340 BC); Part of the Kingdom of Magadha (340–319 BC); Part of the Maurya Empire (319–185 BC); Part of Kingdom of Samatata (232 BC – 800 AD); Part of the Shunga Kingdom (185–73 BC); Part of the Kanva Kingdom (73–26 BC); Bengal was divided between various kingdoms (26 BC – 358 AD); Part of the Gupta Empire (358–590); Part of Kingdom of Kamarupa under the Varman dynasty (350–655); Jaintia Kingdom (500–1835); Gauda Kingdom (590–626); Bengal was divided between various kingdoms, like Vanga and Samatata (c. 650 – c. 750); Mallabhum kingdom (695–1946); Pala Kingdom (c. 750 – c. 1070); Sena Kingdom (c. 1070 – 1204); Kingdom of Taraf (1200–1610); Deva Kingdom (1204–1297); Part of the Delhi Sultanate (1235–1352); Bengal Sultanate (1352–1576); Bengal Subah (or Province of Bengal), part of the Mughal Empire (1576–1757); Ruled by the Nawabs, (1717–1880), nominally subordinate to the Mughal Empire (until 1757), and to the British Empire (after 1757); Bengal Presidency, part of Company rule in India (1757–1858), part of the British Empire; Bengal Presidency, part of the Indian Empire (1858–1947), part of the British Empire; East Bengal, federated state of the Dominion of Pakistan (1947–1956), a monarchical state in personal union with the United Kingdom; East Pakistan, federated state of the Islamic Republic of Pakistan (1956–1971); People's Republic of Bangladesh (1971–present)
Bhutan	Kingdom of Bumthang (7th century – 1616); Kingdom of Bhutan (1616–present)
Brunei	Part of the Kingdom of Srivijaya (c. 1000 – 1276); Part of the Kingdom of Singhasari (1276–1294); Part of the Majapahit Kingdom (1294–1368); Sultanate of Brunei (1368–1888); Protectorate of Brunei (1888–1942), British protectorate, part of the British Empire; Occupied by the Empire of Japan (1942–1945); Protectorate of Brunei (1945–1984), British protectorate, part of the British Empire; Brunei Darussalam (1984–present)
Cambodia	Kingdom of Funan (c.50/68 AD – 550 AD); Kingdom of Chenla (550–802); Khmer Empire (802–1431); Kingdom of Cambodia (1431–1863) and Kingdom of Siam (1782–1867); French Protectorate of Cambodia (1863–1953), member of French Indochina, a collection of Southeast Asian protectorates within the French Empire (1887–1953); French Indochina (1887–1946), federation of colonial possessions of the French Empire; Occupied by the Empire of Japan (1945); Kingdom of Cambodia (1953–1970); Khmer Republic (1970–1975); Democratic Kampuchea (1975–1982); People's Republic of Kampuchea (1979–1989); Coalition Government of Democratic Kampuchea (1982–1990, de jure government of Cambodia); State of Cambodia (1989–1993) and United Nations Transitional Authority in Cambodia (1992–1993); National Government of Cambodia (1990–1993); Kingdom of Cambodia (1993–present)
Greater China	Mainland China Xia Kingdom (semi-mythological; c. 2070–c. 1600 BC); Shang Kingdom (c. 1600 – c. 1046 BC); Zhou Kingdom (c. 1046 – c. 221 BC); Part of the Chagatai Khanate (c. 1227 – 1347); Part of the Kara-Khanid Khanate (c. 840 – 1212); Part of the Qara Khitai (c. 1124 – 1218); Spring and Autumn period (771–473 BC), power was decentralized and the power of the king of Zhou was nominal. This period was marked by battles and annexations between some 170 small feudal states Divided in Warring States (475–221 BC), the king of Zhou continued to play only a symbolic role, some feudal leaders proclaimed themselves kings and proclaimed themselves independent of the king of Zhou; Qin Empire (221–206 BC); Han Empire (206 BC – 220 AD); Kingdom of Minyue (334–111 BC); Kingdom of Nanyue (204–111 BC); Dian Kingdom (279–109 BC); Dong'ou (191–138 BC); Cheng dynasty (25–36); Divided in Three Kingdoms (220–280); Jin Empire (266–420); Divided in North and South dynasties (386–590); Sui Empire (581–618); Tang Empire (618–907); Yan dynasty (756–763); Divided in Five Dynasties and Ten Kingdoms (907–960); Divided in Great Liao Empire (907–1125), Song Empire (960–1279) and Great Jin Empire (1115–1234); Part of the Mongol Empire (1206–1368); Eastern Liao (1213–1269); Eastern Xia (1215–1233); Four Great Native Chiefdoms of Guizhou: Luoshi Kingdom, Mu'ege, Chiefdom of Bozhou, Chiefdom of Shuidong and Chiefdom of Sizhou; Great Yuan Empire (1271–1368); Western Xia Empire (1038–1227); Dali Kingdom (937–1253) and Dachanghe (902–928); The successor state of Nanzhao (937–1253); Great Ming Empire (1368–1644); Shun dynasty (1644–1646); Southern Ming (1644–1662); Great Qing Empire (1636–1912); Dzungar Khanate (1634–1755); Heavenly Kingdom of Great Peace (1851–1864) (Taiwan) Republic of China (1912–1948); Chinese Soviet Republic (1931–1937); Manchukuo (1932–1945), dependency of the Empire of Japan); Mengjiang (1939–1945) (dependency of the Empire of Japan); South Chahar Autonomous Government (1937–1939), dependency of the Empire of Japan; North Shanxi Autonomous Government (1937–1939) People's Republic of China (1949–present, state with limited recognition until 1971) Xinjiang Xinjiang Uyghur Khaganate (744–840); Jushi Kingdom; Shule Kingdom (200 BC – 790); Kingdom of Khotan (56–1006); Kingdom of Kucha (111–648); Shanshan; Part of the Chagatai Khanate (c. 1227 – 1347); Part of the Kara-Khanid Khanate (c. 840 – 1212); Part of the Qara Khitai (c. 1124 – 1218); Tuyuhun (284–670); Qocho Kingdom (843 – 14th century); Ganzhou Uyghur Kingdom (894–1036); Yarkent Khanate (1514–1705); First East Turkestan Republic (1933–1934); Second East Turkestan Republic (1944–1949) Tibet Zhangzhung (500 BC – 625 AD); Tibetan Empire (618–842); Xiliangfu (906–1016); Era of Fragmentation (842–1253); Kingdom of Lingtsang (11th century – 1959); Kingdom of Powo (1330–1928); Phagmodrupa dynasty (1354–1618); Kingdom of Derge (15th century – 1956); Kingdom of Chakla (1407–1950); Rinpungpa (1435–1565); Namgyal dynasty of Ladakh (1460–1842); Tsangpa dynasty (1565–1642); Khoshut Khanate (1642–1717); Ganden Phodrang (1642–1959) Island of Taiwan Kingdom of Middag (17th century); Dutch Formosa, part of the Dutch colonial empire (1624–1662); Spanish Formosa, part of the Spanish Empire (1626–1642); Kingdom of Tungning (1661–1683); Qing Taiwan (1683–1895), dependency of the Qing Empire; Taiwan Prefecture (1684–1887), Taiwan Province (1887–1895); Republic of Formosa (1895, proto-state, existed for approximately five months); Japanese Taiwan (1895–1952), dependency of the Empire of Japan (until 1945) (Taiwan) Republic of China (1945–present), major territory (Taiwan Area), state with limited recognition (from 1971)
Cyprus	Part of the New Kingdom of Assyria (911–669 BC); Part of the Neo-Babylonian Empire (626–545 BC); Part of the Achaemenid Empire (545–321 BC); Part of the Empire of Alexander the Great (321–305 BC); Part of the Ptolemaic Kingdom (305–31 BC); Roman Cyprus, province of the Roman Empire (31 BC – 395 AD), province of the Byzantine Empire (395–668); Part of the Umayyad Caliphate (668–750); Part of the Abbasid Caliphate (750–965); Theme of Cyprus, part of the Byzantine Empire (965–1192); Kingdom of Cyprus (1192–1489); Venetian Cyprus, part of the Republic of Venice (1489–1571); Eyalet of Cyprus (1571–1670), Eyalet of the Ottoman Empire; Sanjak of the Eyalet of the Archipelago (1670–1703), Eyalet of the Ottoman Empire; Cyprus, fief of the Grand Vizier of the Ottoman Empire (1703–1745); Eyalet of Cyprus (1745–1748), Eyalet of the Ottoman Empire; Sanjak of the Eyalet of the Archipelago (1748–1867), Eyalet of the Ottoman Empire; Sanjak of the Vilayet of the Archipelago (1867–1912), Vilayet of the Ottoman Empire; British Cyprus (1914–1960), part of the British Empire; Republic of Cyprus (1960–present) Provisional Turkish Cypriot Administration (1967–1974); Autonomous Turkish Cypriot Administration (1974–1975); Turkish Federated State of Cyprus (1975–1983); Turkish Republic of Northern Cyprus (1983–present)
Egypt	18th–20th Dynasties of ancient Egypt, as the New Kingdom of Egypt (1516–1190 BC); 25th Dynasty of Egypt, part of the Kingdom of Kush (715–656 BC); 26th Dynasty of Late Period of ancient Egypt (664–525 BC); First Egyptian Satrapy, part of the Achaemenid Empire as the 27th Dynasty (525–404 BC); 28th–30th Dynasties of Late Period of ancient Egypt (404–343 BC); Second Egyptian Satrapy, part of the Achaemenid Empire as the 31st Dynasty (343–332 BC); Part of the Macedonian Empire (332–323 BC); Ptolemaic Kingdom (332–30 BC); Nabataean Kingdom (3rd century BC – 106 AD); Roman Egypt, part of the Roman Empire (30 BC – 324 AD), part of the Byzantine Empire (324–641); Sasanian Egypt, part of the Sasanian Empire (619–629); Part of the Rashidun Caliphate (641–661); Part of the Umayyad Caliphate (661–750); Part of the Abbasid Caliphate (750–868); Tulunids (868–905); Part of the Abbasid Caliphate (868–935); Ikhshidid dynasty, autonomous state within the Abbasid Caliphate (935–969); Part of the Fatimid Caliphate (969–973); Center of the Fatimid Caliphate, (973–1171); Center of the Ayyubid dynasty, (1171–1218); Part of the Ayyubid dynasty (1174–1218); Center of the Ayyubid dynasty (1218–1250); Mamluk Sultanate (1250–1517); Ottoman Egypt, Eyalet of the Ottoman Empire (1517–1867); Occupied by the First French Empire (1798–1801); Khedivate of Egypt, a de jure autonomous viceroyalty of the Ottoman Empire (1867–1914), occupied by the British Empire (1882–1922); Sultanate of Egypt (1914–1922), part of the British Empire as a British protectorate Kingdom of Egypt (1922–1953); Arab Republic of Egypt (1953–1958); United Arab Republic, in union with Syria (1958–1966); Sinai Peninsula is part of Israel (1966–1982); Sinai Peninsula is returned to the Arab Republic of Egypt (1982–present)
Georgia	Colchis (13th century BC – 131 AD); Kingdom of Iberia (302 BC – 580 AD); Lazica (131–697 AD); Kingdom of Abkhazia (778–1008); Principality of Iberia (588–888); Emirate of Tbilisi (736–1122); Kingdom of Hereti (893–1020s); Kingdom of the Iberians (888–1008); Kingdom of Kakheti-Hereti (1014–1104); Kingdom of Georgia, (1008–1490); Kingdom of Imereti (1455–1810); Kingdom of Kakheti (1465–1762); Kingdom of Kartli (1478–1762); Samtskhe-Saatabago (1266–1625); Kingdom of Kartli-Kakheti (1762–1800); Principality of Abkhazia (1463–1810); Principality of Guria (1460s–1810); Principality of Mingrelia (1557–1803); Part of the Russian Empire (1800–1917, conquest ended in 1810); Transcaucasian Democratic Federative Republic (1918); Democratic Republic of Georgia (1918–1921); Georgian Soviet Socialist Republic (1921–1922), federated state of the Soviet Union (in 1922); Federative Union of Socialist Soviet Republics of Transcaucasia, federated state of the Soviet Union (1922–1936); Georgian Soviet Socialist Republic, federated state of the Soviet Union (1936–1990); Republic of Georgia (1990–1995), federated state of the Soviet Union (until 1991); Georgia (1995–present) Principality of Abkhazia (1463–1810); Socialist Soviet Republic of Abkhazia (1921–1931); Abkhaz Autonomous Soviet Socialist Republic (1931–1991); Republic of Abkhazia (1991–present) Kingdom of Alania South Ossetian Autonomous Oblast (1922–1991); Republic of South Ossetia (1991–present)
India	Indus Valley Civilisation (c. 3300 BC – c. 1300 BC); Inhabited by the Cemetery H culture (c. 1700 BC – c. 1500 BC); Indian Subcontinent was divided in Janapadas (c. 1500 BC – c. 600 BC); Indian Subcontinent was divided in 16 states called Mahajanapadas (14 kingdoms and 2 oligarchic republics) (c.600 BC-345 BC); Nanda Kingdom (5th or 4th century–322 BC), one of the 16 Mahajanapadas, who then sought to conquer and unify today's northern India; Maurya Empire (322–185 BC)(The empire was founded when Chandragupta Maurya dethroned the last king of the Nanda dynasty, putting the Maurya dynasty in the power and continuing the military conquests in the Indian subcontinent. Political unity in verified historiography was first achieved by Chandragupta Maurya); Ancient Tamil Kingdoms: Pandya dynasty (4th or 3rd century BC – 1618); Chola dynasty (300s BC – 1280); Chera dynasty (300 BC – 1528); Ay kingdom (1st–10th century); Pallava dynasty (275–897); Kalabhra dynasty (3rd–6th century); Mushika dynasty India was divided between various middle kingdoms (230 BC–1206 AD): Yaudheya (5th century BC – 4th century AD); Shunga Empire (185 to 78 BC); Satavahana dynasty (Late 2nd century BC – early 3rd century AD); Kuninda kingdom (2nd century BC – 3rd century AD); Arjunayanas (2nd century BC – 6th century AD); Mahameghavahana dynasty (2nd or 1st century BC – 4th century AD); Chutu dynasty (125–345); Mitra dynasty (150–50 BC); Alupa dynasty (200–1444); Abhira dynasty (203–315/370); Andhra Ikshvaku (3rd–4th century); Nagas of Padmavati (early 3rd–mid 4th century); Vakataka dynasty (250–500); Gupta Empire (280–550); Davaka kingdom (4th–6th century); Khokhra Chieftaincy (300s–1952); Kadamba dynasty (345–540); Western Ganga dynasty (350–1000); Kamarupa (350–1140); Traikutaka dynasty (388–456); Sharabhapuriya dynasty (5th–6th century); Vishnukundina dynasty (420–624); Maitraka dynasty (475–776); Eastern Ganga dynasty (493–1947); Maukharis of Kannauj (510–606); Nala dynasty (6th century); Shailodbhava dynasty (6th–8th century); Pushyabhuti dynasty (500–647); Chalukya dynasty (543–753); Kalachuri dynasty (550–625); Panduvamshis (7th–8th century); Kalachuris of Tripuri (7th century – 1212); Jethwa dynasty (620–1948); Eastern Chalukyas (624–1189); Karkota dynasty (625–855); Partially part of the Brahman Kingdom of Sindh (632–712); Mana dynasty (650–850); Varman dynasty of Kannauj (mid 7th century – 770); Bhauma-Kara dynasty (8th–10th century); Shilahara dynasty (8th–13th century); Chavda dynasty (690–942); Pratihara dynasty (730–1036); Saindhava (735–920); Pala Empire (750–1161); Rashtrakuta Empire (753–982); Somavamshi dynasty (9th–12th century); Kalachuris of Sarayupara (800–1080); Kingdom of Chanda (807–1751); Utpala dynasty (855–1003); Western Chalukya Empire (973–1189); Lohara dynasty (1003–1320); Chindaka Naga (1023–1324); Hoysala Kingdom (1026–1343); Pithipatis of Magadha (11th–13th century); Kalachuris of Ratnapura (11th–13th century); Kakatiya dynasty (1163–1323); Kalachuris of Kalyani (1164–1181); Yadava dynasty (1187–1317); Delhi Sultanate (1206–1526), ruled a major part of the northern Indian subcontinent Vijayanagara Empire (1336–1646), ruled a major part of the southern Indian subcontinent Several sultanates declared independence from Delhi: Madurai Sultanate (1335–1378); Bahmani Kingdom (1347–1527); Khandesh Sultanate (1382–1601); Malwa Sultanate (1392–1562); Jaunpur Sultanate (1394–1479); Gujarat Sultanate (1407–1573); Ahmadnagar Sultanate (1490–1636); Berar sultanate (1490–1572); Sultanate of Bijapur (1490–1686); Bidar Sultanate (1492–1619); Sultanate of Golconda (1518–1687); There were other regional powers present, such as the Ahom kingdom, Bhoi dynasty, Chero chieftaincy, Chowta dynasty, Chudasama dynasty, Chutia kingdom, Dimasa Kingdom, Gajapati Empire, Garha kingdom, Kingdom of Haihaiyavansi, Kamata Kingdom, Kampili kingdom, Karnats of Mithila, Kolathunadu, Madurai Nayak dynasty, Kingdom of Manipur, Mushika dynasty, Musunuri Nayakas, Nayakas of Chitradurga, Nayakas of Keladi, Oiniwar dynasty, Rajput states, Reddi Kingdom, Sambuvarayar, Thanjavur Nayak kingdom, Twipra Kingdom, Venadu kingdom, Yajvapala dynasty, and Zamorin (1200s–1300s); Raj Darbhanga; Pratapgarh Kingdom; Kingdom of Nagpur; Portuguese India, part of the Portuguese Empire (1505–1961); Mughal Empire (1526–1556 AD); Sur Empire (1540–1556); Mughal Empire (1555–1717); French India, Part of the French Empire (1664–1962); India divided during the Mughal Era (1717–1857): Maratha Empire (later, the "Maratha Confederacy"), Kingdom of Mysore, Travancore, Kingdom of Sikkim, Sikh Empire, Kingdom of Cochin, Koch dynasty and many other states. However, the Mughal Emperor (in Maratha) continued to be the highest manifestation of sovereignty. The Muslim, Hindu (including Maratha), and Sikh leaders took part in ceremonial acknowledgements of the emperor as the sovereign of India. East India Company, part of the British Empire (1757–1858); Indian Empire, part of the British Empire (1858–1947); Union of India, a monarchy in personal union with the United Kingdom (1947–1950); Republic of India (1950–present)
Indonesia	Kandis kingdom (1st century BC − 13th century); Kingdom of Salakanagara in Java (130–362 AD); Tarumanagara (450–669); Samaskuta kingdom (before 5th century); Kantoli (5th century); Kalingga kingdom (6th–7th century); Sunda Kingdom (669–1579); First Hindu Kingdom of Kutai in Kalimantan (4th century); Srivijaya (4th century–13th century); Galuh Kingdom (669–1482); Mataram kingdom (716–1016); Bali Kingdom (914–1908); Kingdom of Luwu (between 10th and 14th – 19th century); Kahuripan (1019–1045); Kediri kingdom (1042–1222); Janggala (1045–1136); Pannai (11th–14th century); Singhasari (1222–1292); Majapahit (1292–1478); Negara Daha, Negara Dipa, Blambangan Kingdom (13th–18th century); Pagaruyung kingdom (1347–1833); Segati Kingdom (15th–16th century); Various Islamic Kingdoms: Sultanate of Cirebon (1447–1679), Demak Sultanate (1475–1568), Kingdom of Pajang (1568–1586), Mataram Sultanate (1586–1755), Banten Sultanate (1527–1813), Yogyakarta Sultanate (1755–1950) and Surakarta Sunanate (1745–present) in Java; Aru kingdom (1225–1613), Samudera Pasai Sultanate (1267–1524), Malacca Sultanate (1400–1511), Aceh Sultanate (1496–1903), Kalinyamat Sultanate (1529–1599), Sultanate of Langkat (1568–1946), Asahan Sultanate (1630–1946), Sultanate of Deli (1632–1946), Palembang Sultanate (1659–1823), Sultanate of Siak Sri Indrapura (1722–1949), Sultanate of Serdang (1723–1946), Lambri in Sumatra; Sultanate of Banjar (1526–1860), Sultanate of Sambas (1609–1956), Mempawah Kingdom (1740–1944), Sultanate of Pontianak (1771–1950), Sultanate of Bulungan (1731–1964) in Kalimantan, Sultanate of Gowa (14th century–1945), Kingdom of Tallo, Sultanate of Buton, Kingdom of Bolaang Mongondow (1670–1950) in Sulawesi; Sultanate of Ternate, Sultanate of Tidore, Sultanate of Jailolo, Bima Sultanate, Sultanate of Bacan and Solor Watan Lema Confederation in the Maluku Islands (15th–19th century); and Kingdom of Kaimana (1309–present) in New Guinea; Other Christian kingdoms, such as: Kingdom of Larantuka (1515–1962); Princedoms in West Timor: Amanatun, Amanuban, Sonbai Besar, Amarasi, Sonbai and Sonbai Kecil (17th–20th century); Kongsi republics (mid 18th century–1900) including Lanfang Republic (1777–1884); Part of the Dutch East India Company, part of the Dutch colonial empire (1603–1800); Dutch East Indies, part of the Dutch colonial empire (1800–1949); United States of Indonesia (1949–1950); Netherlands New Guinea, an overseas territory of the Kingdom of the Netherlands (1949–1962); Republic of Indonesia (1950–present)
Iran	Elam (3200–539 BC); Marhasi (2550–2020 BC); Mannaea (850–611 BC); Parsua (840–710 BC); Median kingdom (678–550 BC); Achaemenid Empire (549–330 BC); Part of the Empire of Alexander the Great (330–323 BC); Disputed between the diadochi (323–315 BC); Atropatene (323 BC – 226 AD); Part of the dominions of the Antigonid dynasty (315–312); Part of the Seleucid Empire (312–63 BC); Parthian Empire (247 BC – 224 AD); Sasanian Empire (224–651); Qarinvand dynasty (550s – 11th century); Dabuyid dynasty (642–760); Justanids (791–1004); Masmughans of Damavand (651–971); Bavand dynasty (651–1349); Part of the Umayyad Caliphate (661–750); Baduspanids (665–1598); Part of the Abbasid Caliphate (750–1258); Iranian Intermezzo: Sadakiyans (770–827), Samanid Empire (819–999), Tahirid dynasty (821–873), Saffarid dynasty (861–1003), Alavids, Sajid dynasty (889–929), Ziyarid dynasty (930–1090), Buyid dynasty (934–1062) and Sallarid dynasty (919 – c.1062); Banu Ilyas (932–968); Ghaznavids (998–1042); Kakuyids (1008–1141); Seljuk Empire (1037–1194); Nizari Ismaili state (1090–1273); Hazaraspids (1115–1424); Atabegs of Yazd (1141–1319); Salghurids (1148–1282); Khorshidi dynasty (1184–1597); Part of the Khwarazmian Kingdom (1188–1231); Part of the Mongol Empire (1231–1256); Part of the Ilkhanate (1231–1335); Iran divided after the fall of the Ilkhanate: Injuids (1335–1357), Muzaffarids (1335–1393), Chobanids (1335–1357), part of the Jalayirid Sultanate (1336–1432), Sarbadars (1337–1381), Afrasiyab dynasty (1349–1504), Mar'ashis (1359–1596); Part of the Timurid Empire (1381–1506); Qara Qoyunlu (1375–1468); Aq Qoyunlu (1378–1501); Safavid Iran (1501–1736), occupied by the Hotak dynasty (1722 and 1729); Afsharid Iran (1736–1796); Zand dynasty (1751–1794); Qajar Iran (1785–1925); Pahlavi Iran (1925–1979); Islamic Republic of Iran (1979–present)
Iraq	Sumer Civilization (c. 4000 BC); Lullubi Kingdom (3100–675 BC); Early Dynastic Period (2900–2300 BC); Akkadian Empire (c. 2300 BC); Simurrum Kingdom (2000–1500 BC); Neo-Sumerian Kingdom (c. 2100 BC); Old Kingdom of Assyria; Old Kingdom of Babylonia (c. 1894 BC – 1595 BC); Kassite Empire (c. 1595 – c. 1155 BC); Middle Kingdom of Assyria (1363–912 BC); New Kingdom of Assyria (911–609 BC) Neo-Babylonian Empire (626–539 BC); Part of the Achaemenid Empire (539–330 BC); Part of the Empire of Alexander the Great (330–323 BC); Divided in the satraps of Mesopothamia and Babylonia (323–318 BC); Part of the Antigonid Empire (318–310 BC); Part of the Seleucid Empire (310–128 BC); Adiabene (164 BC – 379); Kingdom of Hatra (2nd century – 241); Characene (141 BC – 222 AD, frequently a vassal state of the Parthian Empire) Part of the Sassanid Empire (224–637); Part of the Rashidun Caliphate (637–661); Part of the Umayyad Caliphate (661–750); Part of the Abbasid Caliphate (750–1258); Partially part of the Buyid dynasty (945–1055); Partially part of the Hamdanid dynasty (890–1004); Mazyadid Emirate (961–1160); Uqaylid dynasty(990–1096); Annazid dynasty (990/991–1117); Part of the Seljuk Empire (1055–1194); Partially part of the Zengid dynasty (1127–1250); Partially part of the Ayyubid dynasty (1185–1258); Partially part of the Mongol Empire (1234–1258); Partially part of the Ilkhanate (1256–1335); Partially part of the Jalayirid Sultanate (1335–1432); Partially part of the Artuqids (1335–1394); Part of the Timurid Empire (1370–1507); Partially part of the Qara Qoyunlu (1374–1468); Part of the Aq Qoyunlu (149–1509); Part of the Safavid Empire (1509–1534); Part of the Ottoman Empire (1534–1918) Kingdom of Iraq under British Administration (1920–1932); Hashemite Kingdom of Iraq (1932–1958); Hashemite Arab Federation (1958), a dual monarchy under a confederation composed of Iraq and Jordan; Iraqi Republic (1958–1968); Iraqi Republic (1968–1992); Republic of Iraq (1992–2003); Republic of Iraq/Coalition Provisional Authority (2003–2004), under US occupation Republic of Iraq (2004–present)
Israel	Inhabited by the Amorites, that established city-states in the region in c. 2000 BC (c. 3500 BC – 1503 BC); Part of the Middle Kingdom of Egypt (1503 BC – c. 1200 BC); Twelve Tribes of Israel (c. 1200 BC – 1047 BC); Philistia (confederation of city-states) (1175–604 BC); Kingdom of Israel (c. 1047 BC – 930 BC); Divided between Kingdom of Israel (referred to by historians as the Northern Kingdom or as the Kingdom of Samaria), Kingdom of Judah and Philistia (930 BC – c. 720 BC); Northern regions became part of the New Kingdom of Assyria (conquered the Kingdom of Samaria), in the South there is the Kingdom of Judah and Philistia (c. 720 BC – 604 BC); Northern regions became part of the Neo-Babylonian Empire, in the South there is the Kingdom of Judah (604–587/586 BC); Part of the Neo-Babylonian Empire (587/586–539 BC); Part of the Achaemenid Empire (539–332 BC); Part of the Empire of Alexander the Great (332–323 BC); Part of the domains of Laomedon of Mytilene (323–319 BC); Part of the domains of Ptolemy I Soter (319–315 BC); Part of the domains of Antigonus I Monophthalmus (315–306 BC); Part of the Antigonid Kingdom (306–301 BC); Part of the Ptolemaic Kingdom of Egypt (301 BC – c. 200 BC); Part of the Seleucid Empire (c. 200 BC – 140 BC); Hasmonean Kingdom of Judaea (140–37 BC); Herodian Kingdom of Judea (37–6 BC); Judea, province of the Roman Empire (6 BC–135 CE); Palaestina, province of the Roman Empire and later Byzantine Empire (135–390); Divided between Palaestina Prima and Palestina Secunda, provinces of the Byzantine Empire (390–614); Part of the Sassanian Empire (614–628); Divided between Palaestina Prima and Palestina Secunda, provinces of the Byzantine Empire (628–636); Part of the Rashidun Caliphate (636–661); Jund Filastin, military district of Bilad al-Sham, region of the Umayyad Caliphate (661–750); Jund Filastin, military district of Bilad al-Sham, region of the Abbasid Caliphate (750–868); Tulunid Emirate (868–905) (Vassal of the Abbasid Caliphate); Jund Filastin, military district of Bilad al-Sham, region of the Abbasid Caliphate (905–939); Ikhshidid State (939–969) (Vassal of the Abbasid Caliphate); Part of the Fatimid Caliphate (969–1011); Jarrahids (1011–1030); Part of the Fatimid Caliphate (1011–1071); Part of the Great Seljuk Sultanate (1171–1098); Part of the Fatimid Caliphate (1098–1071); Kingdom of Jerusalem (1099–1291); Part of the Ayyubid Sultanate (1187–1260); Part of the Mamluk Sultanate (1250–1516); Divided in the sanjaks of Jerusalem, Gaza, Safad, Nablus, Lajjun, parts of the Eyalet of Damascus (1516–1841), Part of the Ottoman Empire; Divided in Mutasarrifate of Jerusalem (1841–1917), Nablus Sanjak, Nasra Sanjak and Acre Sanjak, the later two were parts of the Sidon Eyalet (1856–1864), Syria Vilayet (1864–1888) and Beirut Vilayet (1888–1917), Parts of the Ottoman Empire; Occupied Enemy Territory Administration (1917–1920); Mandatory Palestine (1920–1948), part of the British Empire, Jewish population governed by the Jewish National Council; State of Israel (1948–present)
Japan	Since 40,000 BC humans have been settled crossing through the Korean-Japanese bridge,Jōmon era (14,000–1000/800 BC): Japan was inhabited by a diverse hunter-gatherer and early agriculturalist population, the Jomon culture. Yayoi era (1000/800 BC – 300 AD): Archaeological evidence supports the idea that during this time, an influx of agriculturalists (Yayoi people) from the Korean Peninsula came to Japan, mixing with the native hunter-gatherer population (Jōmon people). Gradually small states was established in Japan. Yamatai (1st–3rd century); Kofun era (300–578); Asuka era (538–710); Nara era (710–794); Heian era (794–1185); Kamakura period (1185–1333), the Kamakura shogunate was established Kenmu Restoration (1333–1336); Ashikaga period (1336–1568), the Ashikaga shogunate was established Azuchi–Momoyama period (1568–1603); Ryukyu Kingdom (1429–1879); Edo period (1603–1868), the Tokugawa shogunate was established Empire of Japan (1868–1945); Allied-occupation of Japan with the United States and the United Kingdom in the post-war period. (1945–1952); Japan (1947–present)
Jordan	What is now Jordan has been inhabited by humans since the Paleolithic period Three stable kingdoms emerged there at the end of the Bronze Age: Ammon, Moab and Edom (13th century – 719 BC); Part of the Middle Kingdom of Assyria (c. 719 BC – 607 BC); Ammon, Moab and Edom (607–596 BC); Part of the Neo-Babylonian Empire (596–539 BC); Part of the Achaemenid Empire (539–330 BC); Nabatean Kingdom (330 BC – 107 AD); Arabia Petraea, province of the Roman Empire (107–269); Part of the Palmyrene Empire (269–273); Arabia Petraea, province of the Roman Empire (273–286); Part of the Byzantine Empire (286–614); Part of the Sassanid Empire (614–625); Part of the Byzantine Empire (625–636); Part of the Rashidun Caliphate (636–661); Part of the Umayyad Caliphate (661–750); Part of the Abbasid Caliphate (750–868); Divided between the Tulunid Emirate and the Abbasid Caliphate (868–905); Part of the Abbasid Caliphate (868–969); Part of the Fatimid Caliphate (969–971); Part of the territory of the Jarrahids (971–1109); Part of the Burid Emirate (1109–1118); Divided between the Kingdom of Jerusalem and the Burid Emirate (1118–1154); Divided between the Kingdom of Jerusalem and the Zengid Emirate (1154–1174); Divided between the Kingdom of Jerusalem and the Ayyubid Sultanate (1174–1187); Part of the Ayyubid Sultanate (1187–1250); Part of the Mamluk Sultanate (1250–1516); Part of the Damascus Eyalet (1516–1856), Eyalet of the Ottoman Empire; Part of the Syria Vilayet (1856–1917), Vilayet of the Ottoman Empire; Occupied Enemy Territory Administration (1917–1920); Emirate of Transjordan (1921–1946); Hashemite Kingdom of Jordan (1946–1958); Hashemite Arab Federation (1958), a dual monarchy under a confederation composed of Iraq and Jordan; Hashemite Kingdom of Jordan (1958–present)
Kazakhstan	Massagetae (c. 8th century BC – c. 3rd century BC); Kangju (1st century BC (?) – 5th century AD); Yueban (160–490); Afrighids (305–995); Part of the First Turkic Khaganate (580–603); Part of the Western Turkic Khaganate (603–659); Kangar Union (659–750); Türgesh Khaganate (699–766); Oghuz Yabgu State (766–1005); Part of the Kimek–Kipchak confederation (880–1200); Part of the Kara-Khanid Khanate (840–1212); Part of the Khazar Khaganate (c. 650–969); Part of the Cuman–Kipchak Confederation (c. 1000 – 1241); Part of the Mongol Empire (1241–1260); Eastern center of the Golden Horde (1260s–1428); Part of the Uzbek Khanate (1428–1446); Center of the Uzbek Khanate (1446–1456); Kazakh Khanate (1456–1847); Part of the Russian Empire (1735/1860–1917); Alash Autonomy (1917–1920, unrecognized state); Kazakh Autonomous Socialist Soviet Republic (1920–1936), federated state of the Russian Soviet Federative Socialist Republic (1919–1936), itself a federated state of the Soviet Union; Kazakh Soviet Socialist Republic (1936–1991), federated state of the Soviet Union; Republic of Kazakhstan (1991–present)
North Korea	Divided in several city-states (c. 800 BC); Gojoseon, first a confederation of Korean city-states, later in the 4th century BC became a kingdom (Unknown – 108 BC); Buyeo (2nd century BC – 494 AD); Proto–Three Kingdoms period (108–57 BC) – Korea was divided in several states: Goguryeo, Okjeo, Eastern Buyeo, Nangnang Kingdom Eastern Ye in the north of the peninsula. There was also the Four Commanderies of Han, part of the Chinese Han Empire; Kingdom of Goguryeo (c. 37 BC – 668 AD); Unified Silla (668–935); Little Goguryeo (669–820); Kingdom of Balhae (698–926); Jeongan (938–986); Kingdom of Goryeo (918–1392); Kingdom of Great Joseon (1392–1897); Korean Empire (1897–1910); Japanese Korea (1910–1952, government abolished in 1945), part of the Japanese Empire; People's Republic of Korea (1945–1946); Soviet Civil Authority (1945–1948); Provisional People's Committee for North Korea (1946–1948); Democratic People's Republic of Korea (1948–present)
South Korea	Jin (confederation of Korean city-states) (300s BC – 100s BC); Proto–Three Kingdoms period – Korea was divided in several states: Samhan (collective name of the Byeonhan, Jinhan, and Mahan confederacies) in the south of the peninsula. Kingdom of Silla (57 BC – 668 AD); Kingdom of Baekje (18 BC – 660 AD); Gaya confederacy (42–562); Tamna (?–1404); Usan (?–512); Unified Silla (668–935); Kingdom of Baekje (892–936); Kingdom of Taebong (901–918) (Changed name from Goryeo to Majin and later to Taebong); Kingdom of Goryeo (918–1392) (Unified the Korean states, the exonym Korea originated from the word Goryeo); Kingdom of Great Joseon (1392–1897); Korean Empire (1897–1910); Japanese Korea (1910–1952, government abolished in 1945), Part of the Japanese Empire Provisional Government of the Republic of Korea in exile in China (1919–1948); People's Republic of Korea (1945–1946); United States Army Military Government in Korea (1945–1948); Republic of Korea (1948–present)
Kuwait	In 1613, the town of Kuwait was founded in the present-day location of Kuwait City. (1613–1670), Part of the Eyalet of Lahsa, Eyalet of the Ottoman Empire; Part of the Bani Khalid Emirate (1670–1752); Sheikhdom of Kuwait, independent state (1752–1871); Sheikhdom of Kuwait, de facto part of the Basra Vilayet (1871–1899), Vilayet of the Ottoman Empire; Sheikhdom of Kuwait, part of the British Empire as a protectorate (1889–1913); Sheikhdom of Kuwait, autonomous kaza of the Ottoman Empire (1913–1919); Sheikhdom of Kuwait, part of the British Empire as a protectorate (1919–1961); State of Kuwait (1961–1990); Republic of Kuwait (1990), puppet state of Ba'athist Iraq; Kuwait Governorate (1990–1991), governorate of Ba'athist Iraq; State of Kuwait (1991–present)
Kyrgyzstan	Part of the territory of the Hephthalites (497–571); Part of the First Turkic Khaganate (571–603); Western Turkic Khaganate (603–657); Part of the Protectorate General to Pacify the West (657–757), protectorate of the Tang Empire; Karluk Yabghu (756–940); Part of the Uyghur Khaganate (791–840); Center of the Kara-Khanid Khanate (840–1130); Part of the Kara-Khanid Khanate (1130–1137); Kara Khitai (1137–1218, also known as the Western Liao Empire or the Great Liao Empire); Part of the Chagatai Khanate (c. 1300 – 1347); Part of Moghulistan (1347–1380, also known as the Eastern Chagatai Khanate); Divided between the Timurid Emirate and the Moghulistan (1380–1507); Divided between the Uzbek Khanate and the Moghulistan (1507–1513); Divided between the Khanate of Bukhara and the Yarkent Khanate (1513–1705); Divided between the Khanate of Bukhara and the Dzungar Khanate (1705–1710); Part of the Dzungar Khanate (1710–1758); Part of the Qing Empire (1758–1865); Part of the Russian Empire (1865–1867); Part of the Russian Turkestan (1867–1917), Krai Territory of the Russian Empire; Part of the Turkestan Autonomy (1917–1918, unrecognized state); Part of the Turkestan Autonomous Soviet Socialist Republic (1918–1924), federated state of the Russian Soviet Federative Socialist Republic, itself a federated state of the Soviet Union; Kara-Kirghiz Autonomous Oblast (1924–1926), federated state of the Russian Soviet Federative Socialist Republic, itself a federated state of the Soviet Union; Kirghiz Autonomous Socialist Soviet Republic (1926–1936), federated state of the Russian Soviet Federative Socialist Republic, itself a federated state of the Soviet Union; Kirghiz Soviet Socialist Republic (1936–1991), federated state of the Soviet Union; Kyrgyz Republic (1991–present, name changed from Republic of Kyrgyzstan in 1993)
Laos	Mueang city-states (c. 700s – 1354); Muang Phuan (13th century – 1893); Kingdom of Lan Xang (1354–1707); Divided in Kingdom of Luang Phrabang (1707–1949), Kingdom of Champasak (1713–1904), and Kingdom of Vientiane (1707–1828), Luang Phrabang and Vientiane were vassals to the Burmese Monarchy (1765–1779), all the three kingdoms were vassals to the Kingdom of Siam (1779–1893); French Protectorate of Laos (1893–1953) (constituent of French Indochina, federation of colonial possessions of the French Empire); Kingdom of Laos (1947–1975), French protectorate (1947–1953); Laos People's Democratic Republic (1975–present)
Lebanon	Amurru kingdom (c. 2000 BC – c. 1200 BC); Ancient Phoenicia (1200–858 BC): Lebanon was divided into many states, like Tyre, Sidon, Arwad, Berytus, Byblos; Part of the New Kingdom of Assyria (858–608 BC); Part of the Neo-Babylonian Empire (605–538 BC); Part of the Achaemenid Empire (538–332 BC); Part of the Empire of Alexander the Great (332–323 BC); Part of the Satrap of Laomedon of Mytilene (323–320 BC); Part of the Ptolemaic Kingdom of Egypt (320–314 BC); Part of the kingdom of Antigonus I Monophthalmus (314–301 BC); Part of the Seleucid Empire (301–63 BC); Part of the Roman Republic (and later Roman Empire) (63 BC – 270 AD); Part of the Palmyrene Empire (270–273); Part of the Roman Empire (273–395); Part of the Byzantine Empire (395–611); Part of the Sassanid Empire (611–626); Part of the Byzantine Empire (626–637); Part of the Rashidun Caliphate (637–661); Part of the Umayyad Caliphate (661–750); Part of the Abbasid Caliphate (750–876); Part of the Tulunid Emirate (876–905); Part of the Abbasid Caliphate (905–935); Ikhshidid State (935–969), autonomous state within the Abbasid Caliphate; Part of the Fatimid Caliphate (969–1071); Banu Ammar (1065–1109); Part of the Great Seljuk Sultanate (1071–1109); County of Tripoli (1109–1289); Part of the Mamluk Sultanate (1289–1516); Divided between the Eyalets of Sidon and Tripoli (1516–1864), eyalets of the Ottoman Empire; Divided between the Beirut Vilayet and the Mount Lebanon Mutasarrifate (1864–1917), vilayet and mutasarrifate of the Ottoman Empire; Occupied Enemy Territory Administration (1917–1920); State of Greater Lebanon (1920–1943), constituent of the French Mandate for Syria and the Lebanon, a League of Nations Mandate territory administered by France; Republic of Lebanon (1943–present)
Malaysia	Peninsular Malaysia: Peninsular Malaysia was divided in many states such as Gangga Negara, Langkasuka, Chi Tu, Pan Pan, Kedah and the Melayu Kingdom (c. 100 – 687); Part of Srivijaya (687–1090); Part of the Melayu Kingdom (1090–1250); Peninsular Malaysia was divided in many states such as the Kedah Sultanate, Samudera Pasai Sultanate, Langkasuka and Pahang Tua (1250–1287); Part of the Kingdom of Singhasari (1287–1293); Peninsular Malaysia was divided in many states such as Kedah Sultanate, Samudera Pasai Sultanate, Langkasuka and Pahang Tua (1293–1355); Part of Majapahit (1355–1380); Peninsular Malaysia was divided in many states such as Kedah Sultanate, Samudera Pasai Sultanate, Langkasuka and Pahang Tua (1380–1392); Part of Majapahit (1392–1402); Divided between Majapahit and the Malacca Sultanate (1402 – c. 1467); Divided between the Kedah Sultanate, Malacca Sultanate, Pahang Sultanate and Majapahit (c. 1467 – 1499); Patani Kingdom (1457–1957); Divided between the Kedah Sultanate and the Malacca Sultanate (1499–1511) (Portuguese Empire) Portuguese Malacca (1511–1641), part of the Portuguese Empire; Divided between the Johor Sultanate and the Perak Sultanate (1528 – c. 1620); Occupied by the Aceh Sultanate (1620–1636); Divided in many states such as the Johor Sultanate, the Perak Sultanate, the Selangor Sultanate and the Kingdom of Besut Darul Iman. (1636–1826) (Dutch East India Company) Dutch Malacca (1641–1824), part of the Dutch Empire; British Malacca (1826–1957): Straits Settlements, Federated Malay States and Unfederated Malay States, part of the British Empire; Malayan Union (1946–1948), a federal state and a monarchy in personal union with the United Kingdom; Federation of Malaya (1948–1963) East Malaysia: Part of Srivijaya (c. 900 – 1276); Part of Singhasari (1276–1294); Part of Majapahit (1294–1368); Part of the Sultanate of Brunei (1368–1568); Divided between the Sultanate of Brunei and the Sultanate of Sulu (1568–1888); Sultanate of Sarawak (1599–1641); British Borneo (1841–1963), part of the British Empire Malaysia; Malaysia (1963–present)
Maldives	Sultanate of Maldive Islands (since 1153; Huraa Dynasty 1774–1953; 1954–1968); Republic of Maldive Islands (1953–1954;1968–1969); Republic of Maldives (1969–present)
Mongolia	Inhabited by the Xiongnu (c. 200 BC – 93? AD); Xianbei state (93?–234); Part of the Rouran Khaganate (330–555); Part of the Qara Khitai (c. 1124 – 1218); Part of the First Turkic Khaganate (552–603); Part of the Eastern Turkic Khaganate (603–628); Xueyantuo (628–646); Protectorate General to Pacify the North, protectorate of the Tang Empire; Part of the Second Turkic Khaganate (682–744); Yenisei Kyrgyz Khaganate (693–1207); Tatar confederation (8th century – 1202); Uyghur Khaganate (744–840); Great Liao Empire, (916–1125, also known as the Khitan Empire); Divided in severall Mongol tribes and clans, including Khamag Mongol (1125–1206); Mongol Empire (1206–1271) and Great Yuan Empire (1271–1368); Northern Yuan dynasty (1368–1438); Four Oirats (1438–1478); Northern Yuan dynasty (1478–1634); Qing rule in Mongolia (1635–1911, Inner Mongolia was conquered by the Qing in 1635, however Outer Mongolia only surrendered to the Qing in 1691); Bogd Khanate of Mongolia (1911–1924), partly interrupted by the Chinese Occupation of Mongolia (1919–1921) and Soviet Occupation of Mongolia (1921–1924); Mongolian People's Republic (1924–1992); Mongolia (1992–present)
Myanmar	Thaton Kingdom (300s BC – 1057); Divided between many Pyu city-states (c. 200 BC – c. 1050 AD); Pagan kingdom (849–1297, in c. 1060, unified all the regional city states); Divided between several states, including: Shan States (c. 13th century – 1959); Hanthawaddy kingdom (1287–1539; 1550–1552), Myinsaing Kingdom (1297–1313), Pinya Kingdom (1313–1365), Sagaing Kingdom (1315–1365), Kingdom of Ava (1364–1555), Launggyet dynasty (1287–1429), Kingdom of Mrauk U (1429–1785), Prome Kingdom (1482–1542); Toungoo Empire (1510–1752); Konbaung Kingdom of Burma (1752–1885); Part of the Indian Empire (1858–1937), Part of the British Empire; Crown Colony of Burma (1937–1947), Part of the British Empire); Union of Burma (1948–1962); Socialist Republic of the Union of Burma (1962–1988); Union of Myanmar (1988–2011); Republic of the Union of Myanmar (2011–present)
Nepal	Licchavi (kingdom) (400–750); Nepal Mandala (?–1768); Chaubisi Rajya (?–1768); Baise Rajya (?–1810); Malla dynasty (Nepal) (1201–1769); Kingdom of Nepal (1768–2008, from 1768 until 1810 gradually annexed the states of the Baise Rajya in 1810); Federal Democratic Republic of Nepal
Oman	Imamate of Oman (751–1696); Nabhanid Kingdom of Oman (1154–1624); Imamate of Oman, metropole of the Omani Empire (1696–1856); Imamate of Oman (1856–1892, constituent of Sultanate of Muscat and Oman; Imamate of Oman (1892–1970), constituent of Sultanate of Muscat and Oman, protectorate of the British Empire; Sultanate of Oman (1970–present)
Pakistan	Indus Valley civilisation (c. 3300 BC – c. 1300 BC); Inhabited by the Indo-Aryans (c. 1300 BC – c. 516 BC); Gandhāra kingdom (1200–535 BC); Sindhu-Sauvīra (1000–518 BC); Pauravas (350–100 BC); Part of the Achaemenid Empire (516–330 BC); Ror Kingdom (450 BC – 489 AD); Part of the Empire of Alexander the Great (326–323 BC); Divided in the satraps of Gandhara, Sindh, Punjab, Gedrosia (323–321 BC); Divided between the Maurya Empire and the satraps of Gandhara and Gedrosia (321–303 BC); Part of the Maurya Empire (303–181 BC); Indo-Greek Kingdom (200 BC – 10 AD); Patalene (181–70 BC); Indo-Scythian Kingdom (150 BC – 140 AD); Part of the Indo-Scythian satraps (Apracha, Gandhara, Taxila, the Northern Satraps and the Western Satraps) (35 BC – 12 AD); Indo-Parthian Kingdom (19–50, also known as the Suren Kingdom); Western Satraps (35–415); Kushan Empire (50–240); Part of the Sasanian Empire (230–651); Part of the Gupta Empire (400–502); Alchon Huns Monarchy (458–542); Rai Kingdom of Sindh (489–632); Aulikara Empire (529–545); Taank Kingdom (550–700); Patola Shahis (6th–8th century); Brahman Kingdom of Sindh (632–712); Part of the Umayyad Caliphate (674–750); Part of the Abbasid Caliphate (750–854); Hindu Shahi Monarchy (854–1026); Habbari Emirate (854–1011); Emirate of Multan (855–1010); Partially part of the Saffarid Emirate (977–999); Ghaznavid Sultanate (977–1186); Soomra Sultanate of Sindh (1026–1356); Ghurid Sultanate (1173–1215); Part of the Ghurid Kingdom (1186–1206); Maqpon Kingdom (1190–1840); Partially part of the Delhi Sultanate (1206–1526); Partially part of the Khwarazmian Kingdom (1206–1231); Partially part of the Mongol Empire (1231–1264); Partially part of the Ilkhanate (1264–1335); Samma Sultanate of Sindh (1335–1524); Langah Sultanate (1445–1540); Shah Mir dynasty 1339–1561; Arghun Sultanate of Sindh (1520–1554); Partially part of the Mughal Empire (1526–1752); Partially part of the Sur Empire (1540–1556); Tarkhan Sultanate of Sindh (1554–1591); Partially part of the Safavid Empire (1638–1709); Partially part of the Hotak Emirate (1709–1738); Partially part of the Afsharid Iran (1738–1748); Part of the Durrani Empire (1747–1823); Kalhora Nawabs of Sindh (1701–1783) Partially part of the Maratha Empire (1752–1757); Talpur Kings of Sindh (1783–1843); Partially part of the Sikh Empire (1799–1849); Part of the East India Company (1839–1858); Part of the Indian Empire (1858–1947), part of the British Empire; Pakistan, a federal monarchy in personal union with the United Kingdom (1947–1956); Islamic Republic of Pakistan (1956–present)
Palestine	Inhabited by the Amorites, that established city-states in the region in c. 2000 BC (3500–1503 BC); Part of the Middle Kingdom of Egypt (1503 BC – c. 1200 BC); Twelve Tribes of Israel (c. 1200 BC – 1047 BC); Philistia (confederation of city-states) (1175–604 BC); Kingdom of Israel (c. 1047 BC – 930 BC); Divided between Kingdom of Israel (referred to by historians as the Northern Kingdom or as the Kingdom of Samaria), Kingdom of Judah and Philistia (930 BC – c. 720 BC); Northern regions became part of the New Kingdom of Assyria (conquered the Kingdom of Samaria), in the South there is the Kingdom of Judah and Philistia (c. 720 BC – 604 BC); Northern regions became part of the Neo-Babylonian Empire, in the South there is the Kingdom of Judah (604–587/586 BC); Part of the Neo-Babylonian Empire (587/586–539 BC); Part of the Achaemenid Empire (539–332 BC); Part of the Empire of Alexander the Great (332–323 BC); Part of the domains of Laomedon of Mytilene (323–319 BC); Part of the domains of Ptolemy I Soter (319–315 BC); Part of the domains of Antigonus I Monophthalmus (315–306 BC); Part of the Antigonid Kingdom (306–301 BC); Part of the Ptolemaic Kingdom of Egypt (301 BC – c. 200 BC); Part of the Seleucid Empire (c. 200 BC – 140 BC); Hasmonean Kingdom of Judaea (140–37 BC); Herodian Kingdom of Judea (37–6 BC); Judea, province of the Roman Empire (6 BC – 135 CE); Palaestina, province of the Roman Empire and later of the Byzantine Empire (135–390); Divided between Palaestina Prima and Palestina Secunda, provinces of the Byzantine Empire (390–614); Part of the Sasanian Empire (614–628); Divided between Palaestina Prima and Palestina Secunda, provinces of the Byzantine Empire (628–636); Part of the Rashidun Caliphate (636–661); Jund Filastin, military district of Bilad al-Sham, region of the Umayyad Caliphate (661–750); Jund Filastin, military district of Bilad al-Sham, region of the Abbasid Caliphate (750–868); Tulunid Emirate (868–905) (Vassal of the Abbasid Caliphate); Jund Filastin, military district of Bilad al-Sham, region of the Abbasid Caliphate (905–939); Ikhshidid State (939–969) (Vassal of the Abbasid Caliphate); Part of the Fatimid Caliphate (969–1011); Jarrahids (1011–1030); Part of the Fatimid Caliphate (1011–1071); Part of the Great Seljuk Sultanate (1171–1098); Part of the Fatimid Caliphate (1098–1071); Kingdom of Jerusalem (1099–1291); Part of the Ayyubid Sultanate (1187–1260); Part of the Mamluk Sultanate (1250–1516); Divided in the sanjaks (counties/districts) of Jerusalem, Gaza, Safad, Nablus, Lajjun, parts of the Eyalet (State) of Damascus (1516–1841), part of the Ottoman Empire; Divided in Mutasarrifate of Jerusalem (1841–1917), Nablus Sanjak, Nasra Sanjak and Acre Sanjak, the later two was parts of the Sidon Eyalet (1856–1864), Syria Vilayet (1864–1888) and Beirut Vilayet (1888–1917), part of the Ottoman Empire; Occupied Enemy Territory Administration (1917–1920); Mandatory Palestine (1920–1948), Part of the British Empire, Arab population governed by the Arab Higher Committee; All-Palestine Government (1948–1959), later Occupation of the Gaza Strip by Egypt (1959–1967) and Jordanian annexation of the West Bank (1948–1967); Palestine Liberation Organization (1964–present); Israeli Military Governorate (1967–1981); Israeli Civil Administration (1981–1994); Palestinian National Authority (1994–2013); State of Palestine (2013–present, claimed to be independent since 1988; a UN observer since 2013)
Philippines	The Philippines was divided in several states (c. 900s – 1565), for example: Tondo polity, Butuan, (Lupah Sug, Confederation of Madya-as, Kingdom of Ma-i, Maynila, Kingdom of Cebu, the Sultanate of Sulu and the Sultanate of Maguindanao, the Bruneian Empire occupied Palawan and parts of Mindanao. Captaincy General of the Philippines (1565–1821), part of the Viceroyalty of New Spain, part of the Spanish Empire and briefly occupied by the British (1762–1764); Captaincy General of the Philippines, following the independence of Mexico, all control was transferred to Madrid, Part of the Spanish Empire; United States Military Government of the Philippine Islands (1898–1902) and First Philippine Republic (1899–1901, not recognized by the United States); Insular Government of the Philippine Islands (1901–1935), unincorporated territory of the United States; Commonwealth of the Philippines (1935–1946), unincorporated territory of the United States with commonwealth status Second Philippine Republic (1943–1945), puppet state of the Japanese Empire; Republic of the Philippines (1946–present)
Qatar	Dilmun civilization (c. 4th millennium BC – c. 538 BC); Part of the Sasanian Empire (230 AD – 628 AD); Part of the Islamic Medina (628–632); Part of the Rashidun Caliphate (632–661); Part of the Umayyad Caliphate (661–750); Part of the Abbasid Caliphate (750–889); Part of the Qarmatian Republic (889–1076); Part of the Uyunid Emirate (1076–1253); Ruled by the Usfurid dynasty (1253–1400); Part of the Jabrid Emirate (1400–1521); Part of the Lahsa Eyalet, Eyalet of the Ottoman Empire (1550–1669); Part of the Bani Khalid Emirate (1669–1796); Part of the Emirate of Diriyah (1796–1815); Divided between the Sheikdom of Bahrain and its dependencies and the Emirate of Diriyah (1815–1818); Part of the Sheikdom of Bahrain and its dependencies (1818–1850); Part of the Emirate of Nejd (1850–1853); Divided between the Sheikdom of Bahrain and its dependencies and the Emirate of Nejd (1853–1867); Divided between the Sheikdom of Qatar and the Emirate of Nejd (1867–1872); Part of the Vilayet of Baghdad, Vilayet of the Ottoman Empire (1872–1916); Protectorate of Qatar (1916–1971), part of the British Empire; State of Qatar (1971–present)
Russia	North Asian Russia (Siberia): The steppes of Siberia were occupied by several nomadic peoples, including the Khitan people, various Finnic, Turkic and Mongol peoples. Khazar Khaganate (650–969); Volga Bulgaria (late 9th century – 1240s); Mongol Empire (1206–1368); Golden Horde (1368–1468); Khanate of Kazan (1438–1552); Nogai Horde (1440s – 1634); Astrakhan Khanate (1466–1556); Khanate of Sibir (1468–1598); Kalmyk Khanate (1630–1771); Tsardom of Russia (1580–1721) Jaxa (1665–1674) Russian Empire (1721–1917); Russian Republic (1917); Russian Soviet Federative Socialist Republic (1917–1991), a federated state of the Soviet Union (1922 to 1991); Union of Soviet Socialist Republics (1922–1991); Russian Federation (1991–present) Caucasus states: Circassia (6th century – 1864); Sarir (500? – 12th century); Shamkhalate of Tarki (8th century – 1867); Avar Khanate (13th century – 1864); Simsim (1362–1395); Caucasian Imamate (1828–1859)
Saudi Arabia	Dilmun civilization on the east of the Arabian Peninsula (3rd millennium BC – 538 BC); Kingdom of Thamud (8th century BC – 5th century AD); Lihyanite Kingdom (7th century BC – 24 BC); Kingdom of Gerrha (650 BC – 300 AD); Qedarite Confederation (9th–1st century BC); Kingdom of Kinda (450–550) in the center of Arabian Peninsula. By the late Bronze Age, a historically recorded people and land (Midian and the Midianites) in the north-western portion of Saudi Arabia are well-documented in the Bible. Shortly before the advent of Islam, apart from urban trading settlements (such as Mecca and Medina), much of what was to become Saudi Arabia was populated by nomadic pastoral tribal societies. The east coast was a territory of the Sassanid Empire; Lakhmid Kingdom (c. 300–602); Muhammad, Prophet of Islam, united all the tribes of Arabia under the banner of Islam and created a single Arab Muslim religious polity in the Arabian Peninsula. (622–632); Rashidun Caliphate (632–656), with capital city in Mecca; Part of the Rashidun Caliphate (656–661), (capital city transferred to Kufa, located in modern Iraq); Part of the Umayyad Caliphate (661–750); Part of the Abbasid Caliphate (750–945); Qarmatians established a religious-utopian republic in Eastern Arabia (899–1076); Western Arabia was part of the Buyid Empire (945–968); The Sharifate of Mecca or Emirate of Mecca is established (c. 968). Most of the remainder of what became Saudi Arabia (except the Eastern coast) reverted to traditional tribal rule. Sharifate of Mecca, part of the Ayyubid dynasty which conquered what is now Hejaz (1171–1260); Uyunid Emirate (1076–1253) rules coastal areas in Eastern Arabia; Usfurids rules coastal areas in Eastern Arabia (1253 – c. 1400); Kingdom of Ormus (1200s – 1622) rules coastal areas in Eastern Arabia; Jabrid Emirate (1400 – c. 1521) rules coastal areas in Eastern Arabia. Sharifate of Mecca, part of the Mamluk Sultanate which inherited Hejaz from the Ayyubids (1260–1517); Sharifate of Mecca or Emirate of Mecca (1517–1803), Habesh Eyalet (1554–1802; 1813–1872), Lahsa Eyalet (1560–1670), Shariffate/Emirate and Eyalets of the Ottoman Empire (1517–1804); Bani Khalid Emirate in Eastern Arabia (1670–1790); Emirate of Diriyah (First Saudi State) (1744–1818); Sharifate of Mecca or Emirate of Meca (1814–1916), part of the Ottoman Empire; Part of the Egypt Eyalet (1818–1824), part of the Ottoman Empire; Emirate of Nejd (1824–1891); Emirate of Jabal Shammar (1836–1921); Hejaz Vilayet (1872–1916); Emirate of Riyadh (1902–1913); Emirate of Nejd and Hasa (1913–1921); Sultanate of Nejd (1921–1926); Kingdom of Hejaz (1916–1925); Emirate of Asir (1906–1934); Principality of Najran (1633–1934); Sheikdom of Upper Asir (1916–1923); Kingdom of Hejaz and Nejd, a dual monarchy (1926–1932); Kingdom of Saudi Arabia (1932–present)
Singapore	Kingdom of Singapura (1299–1398); Part of Majapahit (1398–1409); Part of the Malacca Sultanate (1409–1511); Part of the Johor Sultanate (1528–1819); Crown Colony of Singapore (1819–1826), part of the British Empire; Straits Settlements (1826–1946), part of the British Empire; Colony of Singapore (1946–1963), part of the British Empire; State of Singapore (1963–1965), state of Malaysia; Republic of Singapore (1965–present)
Sri Lanka	Unified (543 BC–1597); Sinhala Kingdom (543 BC – 1597 AD); Kingdom of Tambapanni (543–437 BC); Principality of Maya Rata (504 BC – 1153 AD) Anuradhapura Kingdom (437 BC – 1017 AD); Kingdom of Ruhuna (200 BC – 1153 AD); Kingdom of Polonnaruwa (1055–1232); Kingdom of Dambadeniya (1232–1341); Vanni chieftaincies (13th century–1782); Kingdom of Gampola (1341–1371) Kingdom of Kotte (1371–1597) Divided amongst Jaffna kingdom (1232–1620); Kingdom of Kandy (1469–1815); Kingdom of Sitawaka (1521–1594); Portuguese Ceylon (1597–1658), part of the Portuguese Empire; Dutch Ceylon (1658–1796), part of the Dutch Empire; Early British Ceylon (1796–1815), part of the British Empire; Unified (1815–present); British Ceylon (1815–1948), part of the British Empire; Dominion of Ceylon (1948–1972), a monarchy in personal union with the United Kingdom; Democratic Socialist Republic of Sri Lanka (1972–present, renamed from the Free, Sovereign and Independent Republic of Sri Lanka in 1971)
Syria	Eblaite Kingdom (c. 3000 BC – c. 1600 BC); Mariote Kingdom (c. 2900 BC – c. 1760 BC); Armi Kingdom (?–2290 BC); Eblaite Kingdom, Armi and Mariote Kingdom, part of the Akkadian Kingdom (c. 2290BC – c. 2266 BC) (2230–2218 BC); Kingdom of Qatna (2000–1788 BC); Amurru kingdom (2000–1200 BC); Yamhad (1810–1517 BC); Partially part of the Old Assyrian Kingdom (c. 1788 BC – c. 1776 BC); Kingdom of Babylonia (c. 1750 BC – 1502 BC); Part of the Kingdom of Mitanni (c. 1600 BC – c. 1260 BC); Partially part of the New Kingdom of Egypt (c. 1448 BC – c. 1274 BC) and (616–605 BC); Partially part of the Hittite Empire (c. 1365 BC – c. 1200 BC); Part of the Middle Assyrian Kingdom (c. 1363 BC – 912 BC); Divided into many Neo-Hittite states (c. 1200 BC – 738 BC); Kingdom of Aram-Damascus (12th century BC – 732 BC); Part of the New Assyrian Kingdom (c. 911 BC – 609 BC); Aramean states (Aram and Hamath) (c. 870 BC – 840 BC); Part of the New Assyrian Kingdom (840–824 BC); Partially part of the Kingdom of Urartu (824–717 BC); Part of the Neo-Babylonian Empire (608–539 BC); Part of the Achaemenid Empire (539 BC–331 BC); Part of the Empire of Alexander the Great (331–323 BC); Part of the Satrap of Laomedon of Mytilene (323–305 BC); Part of the kingdom of Antigonus I Monophthalmus (305–301 BC); Part of the Seleucid Empire (301–85 BC); Kingdom of Osroene (127–85 BC); Part of the Kingdom of Armenia (85–70 BC); Part of the Roman Empire as the Province of Syria (69 BC – 395 AD); Emesene dynasty (46 BC – 72 AD); Kingdom of Palmyra (69–39 BC); Tanukhids (196–1100); Palmyrene Empire (270–273); Ghassanids Kingdom (220–638), vassal of the Roman Empire; Salihids (4th–6th century BC); Part of the Byzantine Empire (395–613) and (627–637); Part of the Sasanian Empire (613–627); Part of the Rashidun Caliphate (637–661); Part of the Umayyad Caliphate (661–750); Part of the Abbasid Caliphate (750–890) and (905–990); Part of the Tulunid Emirate (868–905); Hamdanid Emirate (890–1004); Part of the Abbasid Caliphate and Hamdanid Emirate (905–945); Part of the Abbasid Caliphate and the Hamdanid Emirates of Aleppo and Al-Jazira (945–990); Divided in many states, ruled by different dynasties like the Hamdanids, the Numayrids, the Marwanids, the Uqaylids (990–1002); Western regions were part of the Fatimid Caliphate. Eastern regions were divided in many states, ruled by different dynasties such as the Numayrids, the Marwanids, the Uqaylids (1002–1024); Divided in many states, ruled by different dynasties like the Mirdasids, the Numayrids, the Marwanids, the Uqaylids (1024–1082); Part of the Seljuk Empire (1082–1121) 1098: Crusader states established in Syria: Principality of Antioch (1098–1268) and County of Edessa (1098–1144) Crusader states (Antioch and Edessa) and the Artuqid Beylik in the East. In the West the Great Seljuk Sultanate (1121–1129) Crusader states (Antioch and, until 1144, Edessa) and the Zengid Emirate (1129–1160) Principality of Antioch and the Emirates of Mosul and Aleppo, ruled by the Zengid dynasty (1160–1183); Principality of Antioch and the Ayyubid Sultanate (1183–1250) Principality of Antioch and the Mamluk Sultanate (1250–1264); Principality of Antioch, the Mamluk Sultanate in the west and the Ilkhanate in the east (1264–1268); Part of the Mamluk Sultanate in the west and of the Ilkhanate in the east (1268–1340); Part of the Mamluk Sultanate in the west and of the Artuqid Beylik in the east (1340–1395); Part of the Mamluk Sultanate in the west and of the Timurid Empire in the east (1395–1405); 1405–1510: Part of the Mamluk Sultanate in the west and of the Aq Qoyunlu in the east 1510–1516: Part of the Mamluk Sultanate of Egypt in the west and of the Safavid Empire in the east Divided in Rakka Eyalet, Damascus Eyalet, Tripoli Eyalet and Aleppo Eyalet (1534–1864) eyalets of the Ottoman Empire; Divided in Aleppo Vilayet, Beirut Vilayet and Syria Vilayet (1864–1917), vilayets Provinces of the Ottoman Empire Occupied Enemy Territory Administration (1917–1920); Alawite State (1920–1936) Arab Kingdom of Syria (1920); Jabal Druze State (1921–1936) State of Aleppo (1920–1925) State of Damascus (1920–1925) State of Syria (1925–1930); First Syrian Republic (1930–1950); Second Syrian Republic (1950–1958); United Arab Republic (1958–1961); Second Syrian Republic (1961–1963); Syrian Arab Republic (Ba'athist regime) (1963–2024); Syrian Arab Republic (2024–present, under a transitional government)
Tajikistan	Part of the Achaemenid Empire (520–329 BC); Part of the Kushan Empire (110–230); Part of the Hephthalites domains (353–570); Principality of Ushrusana (660–893); Part of the Abbasid Caliphate (760–819); Part of the Samanid Amirate (819–999); Divided between the Kara-Khanid Khanate and the Ghaznavid Sultanate (999–1089); Divided between the Seljuk Sultanate and the Ghaznavid Sultanate (1089–1139); Divided between the Qara Khitai and the Ghaznavid Sultanate (1089–1152); Divided between the Qara Khitai and the Ghurid Sultanate (1152–1193); Divided between the Khwarazmian Sultanate and the Ghurid Sultanate (1193–1205); Part of the Khwarazmian Sultanate (1205–1221); Part of the Mongol Empire (1221–1256); Part of the Ilkhanate (1256–1335); Part of the Mihrabanid Kingdom (1335–1382); Part of the Timurid Emirate (1382–1470); Divided between the Timurid Emirate and the Uzbek Khanate (1470–1500); Part of the Uzbek Khanate (1500–1506); Part of the Khanate of Bukhara (1506–1785); Part of the Emirate of Bukhara (1785–1867); Part of the Russian Turkestan (1867–1920), krai of the Russian Empire, Russian Republic and Russian Soviet Federative Socialist Republic; Part of the Bukharan People's Soviet Republic (1920–1924), autonomous republic of Russian Soviet Federative Socialist Republic, itself a federated state of the Soviet Union 1922–1991; Tajik Autonomous Soviet Socialist Republic (1924–1929), autonomous Soviet socialist republic of the Uzbek Soviet Socialist Republic, federated state of the Soviet Union 1924–1991; Tajik Soviet Socialist Republic (1924–1991), federated state of the Soviet Union; Republic of Tajikistan (1991–present)
Thailand	Dvaravati (7th–11th century); Regional states: Hariphunchai (629–1292), Kingdom of Hiran (638–1292), Kingdom of Lavo (648–1388), Phayao Kingdom (1094–1338), Sukhothai Kingdom (1238–1438), Lan Na Kingdom (1292–1775), Nakhon Si Thammarat Kingdom (13th century–1782); Ayutthaya Kingdom (1350–1767), occupied by the Toungoo dynasty of Myanmar from 1564–1593; Thonburi Kingdom (1767–1782); Kingdom of Chiang Mai (1802–1899); Rattanakosin Kingdom (1782–1932); Kingdom of Thailand (1932–present, officially named Siam until 1939 and from 1946 to 1948)
Timor-Leste (East Timor)	Wehali (unknown – 1358); Wehali, part of Majapahit (1358–1490); Wehali (1490–1702, from 1515 within the Portuguese sphere of influence); Portuguese Timor (1702–1975) part of the Portuguese Empire; Timor Timur (1975–1999), province of Indonesia; United Nations Transitional Administration in East Timor (1999–2002); Democratic Republic of Timor-Leste (2002–present)
Turkey	Information related to Anatolia: The territory that today is Turkey was inhabited by Hattian and Hurrian tribes (c. 3500 BC – c. 2550 BC); The territory that today is Turkey was inhabited by Hattian, Hurrian, Kaskians and Anatolian tribes (c. 2550 BC – c. 2000 BC); The territory that today is Turkey was inhabited by Hattian, Hittite, Hurrian, Luwian and Anatolian tribes (c. 2000 BC – c. 1600 BC); Kingdom of Hattusa (1650–1190 BC, also called the Hittite Empire); Assuwa, a confederation (or league) of 22 ancient Anatolian states, was formed some time before 1400 BC, when it was defeated by the Kingdom of Hattusa. Troy was one of the members of the confederation (1600–1400 BC); Kizzuwatna (1600–1220 BC); Arzawa (a "kingdom" or a federation of local powers, Troy was one of the members) (1400–1325 BC); Kingdom of Lydia (1200–546 BC); Divided in many states, such as Lycia, Isuwa, Phrygia, Lycaonia, Lukka, Tabal, Pala, Hubushkia, Pamphylia, Paphlagonia, Purushanda, Kingdom of CiliciaDiauehi, and Mushki. Around 900 BC the Greeks began to establish colonies on the coast. These colonies existed until c. 300 BC (1178–608 BC); Eastern regions falls under the rule of the Assyrian Empire and Kingdom of Ararat (707–609 BC); Kingdom of Lydia conquers all the west of Anatolia. The eastern regions part of the Median Empire (609–550 BC); Part of the Achaemenid Empire (550–334 BC); Part of the Empire of Alexander the Great (334–306 BC); Kingdom of Cappadocia (320s BC – 17 AD); Antigonid Kingdom (306–301 BC); Seleucid Empire (301–131 BC); Kingdom of Pergamon (282–129 BC); Kingdom of Pontus (281 BC – 62 AD); Galatia (280–64 BC); Kingdom of Sophene (3rd century BC – 95 BC); Commagene (163 BC – 72 AD); Western region of Anatolia part of the Roman Republic. (131–64 BC); Part of the Roman Republic (64–27 BC); Part of the Roman Empire (27 BC – 395 AD); Theme, part of the Byzantine Empire (395–1204); Marwanid dynasty (983/900 – 1085); Armenian Kingdom of Cilicia; Sultanate of Rum and Anatolian beyliks (1077–1308), part of the Great Seljuk Sultanate; Divided in Latin Empire, Empire of Nicaea, Empire of Trebizond, Principality of Bitlis, Kurdish emirates, the Sultanate of Rum; Beylik of Karaman (1250–1487); Part of the Byzantine Empire (1261–1453); Part of the Ottoman Empire (1299–1920); Occupied by Greece, Italy, France, United Kingdom and Armenia (1920–1923); Republic of Turkey (1923–present)
Turkmenistan	Part of the Achaemenid Empire (540–333 BC) Part of the Greco-Bactrian Kingdom (256–120 BC); Part of the Seleucid Empire (c. 200 BC – 187 BC); Part of the Parthian Empire (187 BC – 220 AD); Part of the Kushan Empire (30–220); Part of the Sassanid Empire (230–643); Partially part of the Hephthalites (359–570); Kingdom of Guzgan (7th–11th century); Part of the Rashidun Caliphate (643–661); Part of the Umayyad Caliphate (661–750); Part of the Abbasid Caliphate (750–822); Part of the Samanid Empire (819–999); Divided between the Samanid Amirate and the Tahirid Emirate (822–865); Part of the Saffarid Emirate (865–1041); Part of the Ghaznavid Sultanate (999–1037); Divided between the Ghaznavid Sultanate and the Saffarid Emirate (1037–1041); Part of the Great Sejulk Sultanate (1041–1194); Part of the Khwarazmian Kingdom (1194–1231); Part of the Mongol Empire (1231–1264); Part of the Ilkhanate (1264–1335); Partially part of the Kartid Kingdom (1335–1382); Part of the Timurid Emirate (1382–1500); Part of the Uzbek Khanate (1494–1511); Khanate of Khiva (1511–1874); Russian Turkestan (1867–1918) (Krai of the Russian Empire); Turkestan Autonomous Soviet Socialist Republic (1918–1924), autonomous republic of Russian Soviet Federative Socialist Republic, itself a federated state of the Soviet Union Khorezm People's Soviet Republic (1920–1925) Bukharan People's Soviet Republic (1920–1925); Turkmen Soviet Socialist Republic (1922–1991), federated state of the Soviet Union; Turkmenistan (1991–present)
United Arab Emirates	Magan (civilization) (2300–550 BC); Part of the first Islamic state (628–632); Part of the Rashidun Caliphate (632–661); Part of the Umayyad Caliphate (661–750); Part of the Abbasid Caliphate (750–870); Part of the Qarmatian Republic (899–1077); Wajihid Emirate (926–965); Part of the Great Seljuk Empire (1046–1158); Part of the Nabhanid Kingdom of Oman (1155–1622); Part of the Uyunid State (1076–1253); Part of the Kingdom of Ormus (1307–1487); Part of Emirate of Diriyah (1727–1818) Trucial States (1820–1971), British protectorate, part of the British Empire; United Arab Emirates (1971–present)
Uzbekistan	Part of the Achaemenid Empire (c. 530 BC – c. 330 BC); Sogdian city-states (5th century BC – 11th century AD); Part of the Macedonian Empire (330–323 BC); Part of the Seleucid Empire (305–256 BC); Part of the Greco-Bactrian Kingdom (256 BC – c. 145 BC); Kangju (c. 100 BC – c. 400s AD); Part of the Kushan Empire (30–230); Part of the Sassanid Empire (230–359); Part of the Hephthalite domains (c. 440 – c. 566); Part of the First Turkic Khaganate (c. 566 – 580); Part of the Western Turkic Khaganate (580–657); Part of the Protectorate General to Pacify the West, protectorate of the Tang Empire (657–756); Principality of Khuttal (676–765); Principality of Farghana (712–819); Samanid Amirate, dependency of the Abbasid Caliphate (819–900); Samanid Amirate (900–999); Kara-Khanid Khanate (840–1212); Great Seljuk Sultanate (1087–1137); Part of the Qara Khitai Empire (1137–1218, also known as Great Liao Empire); Part of the Mongol Empire (1218–1226); Part of the Chagatai Khanate (1226–1370); Timurid Emirate (1370–1437); Uzbek Khanate (1437–1506); Khanate of Bukhara (1506–1785); Khanate of Kokand (1709–1876); Emirate of Bukhara (1785–1873); Part of the Russian Empire as the Emirate of Bukhara (1873–1917); Emirate of Bukhara (1917–1920); Bukharan People's Soviet Republic (1920–1924); Uzbek Soviet Socialist Republic (1924–1991, federated state of the Soviet Union; Republic of Uzbekistan (1991–present)
Vietnam	Kingdom of Xích Quỷ (2879–2524 BC, semi-mythical); Kingdom of Văn Lang (524–258 BC); Kingdom of Âu Lạc (257–180 BC); Kingdom of Nanyue (204–111 BC, Nanyue Empire during the reigns of Zhao Tuo and Zhao Mo); Vietnam under Chinese rule (111 BC – 40 AD); Kingdom of Lĩnh Nam (40–43); Vietnam under Chinese rule (43–544); Kingdom of Champa (192–1832); Empire of Vạn Xuân (544–602); Vietnam under Chinese rule (602–939); Principality of Tĩnh Hải (939–967); Đại Việt Empire (968–1400); Ngưu Hống (11th century – 1432); Đại Ngu Empire (1400–1407); Vietnam under Chinese rule Đại Việt Empire (1427–1804); Sip Song Chau Tai (17th century – 1954); Principality of Hà Tiên (1707–1832); Empire of Vietnam, under the Nguyễn dynasty (1802–1887) still nominally enthroned until 1945; French Indochina (1887–1940; 1945–1946), federation of colonial possessions of the French Empire French Cochinchina (1862–1949) Annam Protectorate (1884–1949) Tonkin Protectorate (1884–1949) Occupied by the Empire of Japan (1940–1944); State of Vietnam (1949–1955, provisional government, official successor of French Indochina); Democratic Republic of Vietnam (North Vietnam) (1945–1976); Republic of Vietnam (South Vietnam) (1955–1975); Republic of South Vietnam (1976, existed from 1969 as Provisional Revolutionary Government of the Republic of South Vietnam, an underground opposition to South Vietnam, later a transitional government); Socialist Republic of Vietnam (1976–present)
Yemen	Sheba (c. 1200 BC – 275 AD); Hadhramaut (c. 800 BC – 300 AD); Awsan (800 – 500 BC); Ma'in (800–100 BC); Qataban (c. 400 BC – 200 AD); Himyar (c. 200 BC – 525 AD); Part of the Kingdom of Aksum (525–570); Part of the Sasanian Empire (570–630); Part of the first Islamic state (630–632); Part of the Rashidun Caliphate (632–661); Part of the Umayyad Caliphate (661–750); Part of the Abbasid Caliphate (750–819); Ziyadid Emirate, autonomous state within the Abbasid Caliphate (819–945); Yu'firids (847–997); Ziyadid Emirate, independent state (945–1018); Divided in many Yemeni states as the Najahid Emirate (1022/1050–1158), Sulayhid Sultanate (1047–1138), Sulaymanids (1063–1174), Zurayids (1083–1174) and the Mahdids (1159–1174); Part of the Ayyubid Sultanate of Egypt (1174–1229) Rasulid Sultanate of Yemen (1229–1454); Kathiri State of Seiyun, independent state (1395–1654), conquered by the Qasimid State; Mahra Sultanate, independent state (1432–1658), conquered by the Qasimid State; Tahirid Sultanate (1454–1517); Yemen Eyalet (1517–1636) (eyalet of the Ottoman Empire); Qasimid State (1597–1686, gradually expelled the Ottomans from the territory of modern Yemen by 1636) and some small states in its orbit Kathiri State of Seiyun, independent state (1686–1886), regained independence Mahra Sultanate, independent state (1686–1872), regained independence Divided in severall states, including the Qasimid State, Kathiri State of Seiyun, Mahra Sultanate, Alawi Sheikhdom, Beda Sultanate, Emirate of Beihan and Fadhli Sultanate (1686–1849); Yemen Eyalet (1849–1872), eyalet of the Ottoman Empire, in the north, the south continued divided in small states Yemen Vilayet (1872–1918), vilayet of the Ottoman Empire, in the north Aden Protectorate (1872–1963), part of the British Empire in the south Kingdom of Yemen (1918–1962) in the north Yemen Arab Republic (North Yemen) (1962–1990); Federation of South Arabia (1963–1967) in the south People's Democratic Republic of Yemen (South Yemen) (1967–1990, named People's Republic of Southern Yemen from 1967 to1970); Republic of Yemen (1990–present) Democratic Republic of Yemen (1994); Republic of Yemen (Supreme Political Council) (2014–present, Houthi government); Southern Transitional Council (2018–present)

== See also ==
- List of sovereign states and dependent territories in Asia
- Decolonisation of Asia
- Succession of states
