= Liu Shuzhen (cheftain) =

Ruler of the Chiefdom of Shuidong

Liu Shuzhen (died after 1381), was a ruler of the Chiefdom of Shuidong from 1381 to an unknown year.
