= She–An Rebellion =

Rebellion in Ming China (1621–1629)

- Part of the Ming-Qing transition
Date	Fall 1621 – Summer 1629
Location	Sichuan and Guizhou
Result	Ming victory

Belligerents
Kingdom of Shu (ethnic Yi): Chiefdom of Shuixi; Chiefdom of Shuidong	Ming dynasty

Commanders and leaders
She Chongming †; An Bangyan †; An Wei (surrendered); Song Wanhua (executed); Song Siyin (executed)	Zhu Xieyuan; Wang Sanshan (executed); Lin Zhaoding; Qin Liangyu

Strength
300,000	450,000

Casualties and losses
27,500+	45,000+

The She–An Rebellion (Chinese: 奢安之亂), also called the Yongning Rebellion, was a Yi uprising that occurred in Sichuan and Guizhou in late fall of 1621. As a consequence of the taxes imposed by the Ming dynasty, the Yi chieftains She Chongming and An Bangyan rose up in revolt. The rebellion lasted almost eight years and was eventually suppressed in the summer of 1629.

== Background ==
The Ming dynasty raised taxes to finance the war effort in the frontier province of Liaodong where the Later Jin dynasty was invading. Provinces such as Sichuan and Guizhou were required to provide troops, supplies, and grain as taxes.

== Rebellion ==
The Yongning (now Xuyong) tusi chief She Chongming originally agreed to provide Ming 1,500,000 kg of grain and 20,000 Yi tribal warriors for Liaodong. However, when he showed up at Chongqing in 1621 he brought with him 20,000 troops along with their families numbering an additional 80,000, including animals. When the local governor informed them that only fighters were needed and ordered the majority of them to return home while refusing to provide food for the trip back, they attacked Chongqing, killed the governor, and several of the local officials. It is likely that She planned to attack Chongqing from the beginning since he had already started laying waste to regions he passed through on the way to Chongqing. According to one traveler in the region at the time, "any semblance to human activity is gone." She proclaimed the Kingdom of Shu with himself as its ruler and sent his forces, which had reportedly swelled by an additional 100,000 Chinese renegades, to conquer Sichuan. The rebels swept from Sichuan into Guizhou, taking Zunyi, but were unable to conquer Chengdu, which they besieged unsuccessfully for 102 days. Chongqing was recovered by Ming forces a month later.

Following in She Chongming's footsteps, the tusi of Nasu Yi, An Bangyan, also sent troops instead of grain as tax payment. When the Ming officials refused his troops rations and supplies, An rebelled as well and joined She Chongming "in order to reclaim his ancestors' glory." Together the two aboriginal chieftains marched on Guiyang with an army of 300,000 and besieged it. Although Guiyang only contained 5,000 soldiers, the indigenous army was unable to penetrate its defenses since they only attacked one side at a time. The siege of Guiyang was lifted after 296 days in late winter of 1622. Barely 200 defenders survived. An Bangyang retreated into his mountain hideouts and feigned surrender, but when an envoy was sent to negotiate his surrender, he had the messenger killed.

The rebellion renewed in the spring of 1623 when a Ming army of 40,000 was ambushed and killed by local aboriginals. The commander on the scene, Zhu Xieyuan, immediately requested an additional 200,000 troops as well as three million taels in supplies to suppress the rebellion. A year later, the conflict in Sichuan was still ongoing. The Ming army had reportedly killed 18,000 rebels, but could not decisively end the rebellion due to a lack of supplies. By 1625, 27,500 rebels had been killed. Conflict in the Sichuan-Guizhou region would continue until the summer of 1629 when eventually a total of 450,000 troops were mobilized to engage with She Chongming and An Bangyang's Shu forces. Both rebel leaders perished in battle in the same year. The Kingdom of Shu was quickly dismantled.

== Aftermath ==
The She–An Rebellion took an astronomical toll on Ming finances. The entire anti-rebellion effort cost the Ming a total of 35 million taels of silver and consumed 145 billion kilograms of grain.

== See also ==
- Late Ming peasant rebellions
- Transition from Ming to Qing

== Bibliography ==
- Cosmo, Nicola di (2003), Political Frontiers, Ethnic Boundaries, and Human Geographies in Chinese History
- Dardess, John (2012), Ming China 1368-1644 A Concise History of A Resilient Empire, Rowman & Littlefield Publishers, Inc.
- Swope, Kenneth (2014), The Military Collapse of China's Ming Dynasty, Routledge
- Wakeman, Frederic (1985), The Great Enterprise: The Manchu Reconstruction of Imperial Order in Seventeenth-Century China, vol. 1, University of California Press
