= Chiefdom of Bozhou =

Yi Tusi chiefdom (876–1600)

Chiefdom of Bozhou 播州土司
- 876–1600
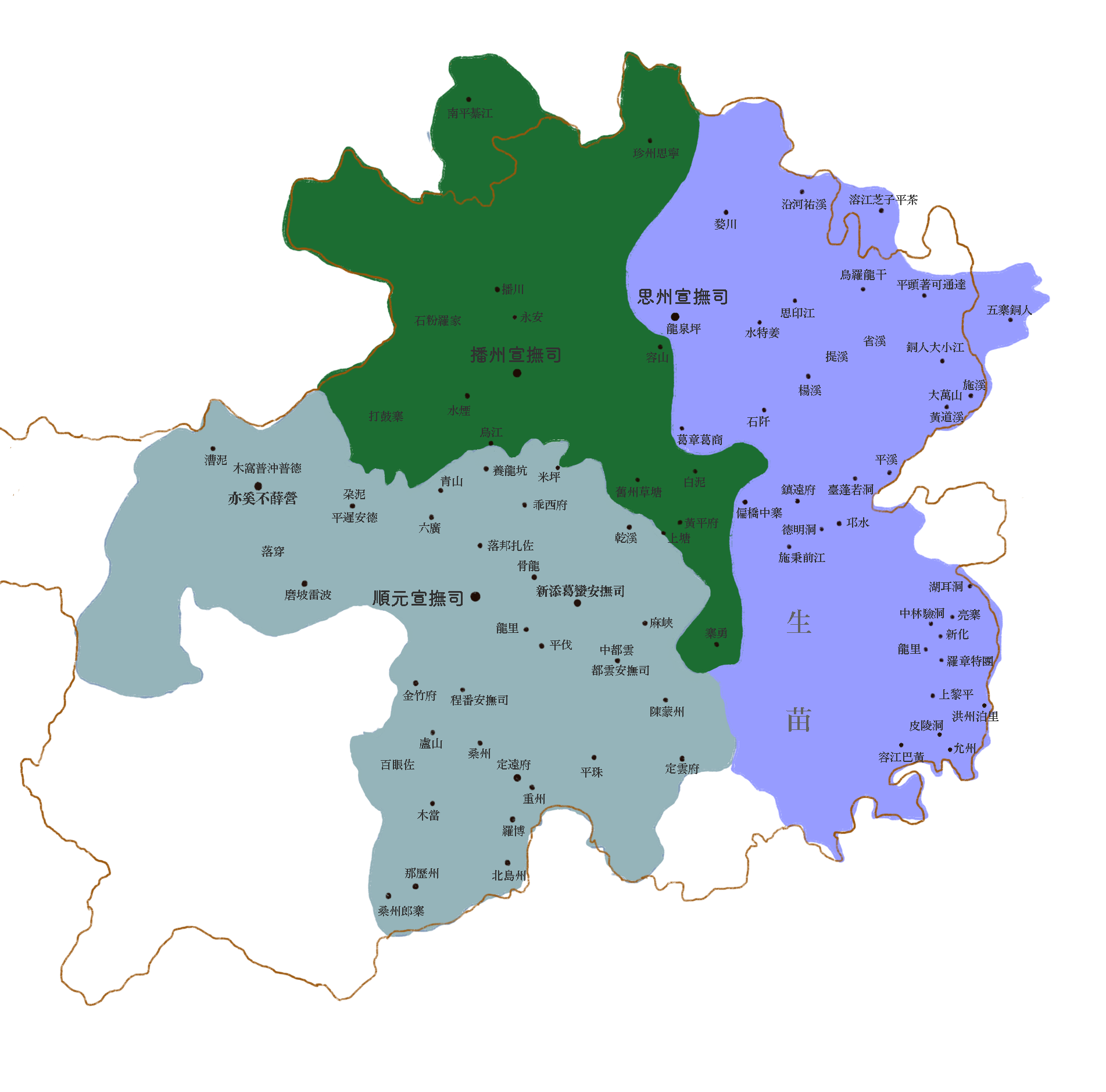
- Chiefdom of Bozhou
- Status: Native Chiefdom of China
- Capital: Bozhou (present day Zunyi)
- Common languages: Nasu, Chinese, Gelao, Hmong
- Government: Monarchy
- Chieftain
  - 876–?: Yang Duan (first)
  - 1595–1600: Yang Chaodong (last)
- History
  - Established: 876
  - Annexed by Ming Dynasty: 1600
Preceded by	Succeeded by
Nanzhao	Ming dynasty
- Today part of: China

The Chiefdom of Bozhou (Chinese: 播州土司; pinyin: Bōzhōu Tǔsī), ruled by the Yang clan, was an autonomous Tusi chiefdom established by Yang Duan (楊端) during the Tang dynasty. After he conquered the Bozhou Prefecture (centred on modern Zunyi) from the Nanzhao Kingdom, Yang Duan was recognized as the hereditary ruler of the region by the Tang court in 876.

The Yang clan ruled Bozhou for more than seven centuries, surviving several dynastic changes in China, until its last ruler Yang Yinglong rebelled against the Ming dynasty in 1589. It took more than a decade for the Ming to suppress the rebellion, and the Bozhou Tusi was defeated and abolished in 1600.

Bozhou, Sizhou, Shuidong and Shuixi were called "Four Great Tusi in Guizhou" (贵州四大土司) by Chinese. "Liangguang [ruled by] Cen and Huang, Sizhou and Bozhou [ruled by] Tian and Yang" (Chinese: 两广岑黄，思播田杨; pinyin: Liǎngguǎng Cén Huáng, Sī Bō Tián Yáng), an idiom current among Southwestern Mandarin speakers, proved that the Yang clan was once one of the most powerful clans in Southwestern China.

== History ==
The Chiefdom of Bozhou was established in 876 when the first chieftain Yang Duan occupied Bozhou (modern-day Zunyi) in southwest China. It lasted for about 725 years over 29 generations through the Tang, Song, Yuan, and Ming dynasties. The main fortress of Bozhou was Hailongtun, constructed in 1257. About 17,000 Bozhou soldiers who were led by the 29th Chieftain Yang Yinglong (楊應龍) fought against the 240,000 Ming Dynasty for 114 days. In the end the Tusi force was defeated and Yang Yinglong was killed. The Ming Dynasty burned down Hailongtun, and put an end to the 725 years rule of the Yang Family.

== List of Bozhou Chieftains ==
Below are Bozhou chieftains

No.	Name	Chinese	Reign	Notes
1	Yang Duan	楊端	876–?	
2	Yang Munan	楊牧南	?–?	son of Yang Duan
3	Yang Bushe	楊部射	?–?	son of Yang Munan
4	Yang Sangong	楊三公	?–?	son of Yang Bushe
5	Yang Shi	楊實	?–?	son of Yang Sangong
6	Yang Zhao	楊昭	?–?	son of Yang Shi
7	Yang Guiqian	楊貴遷	?–1052	adoptive son of Yang Shi descendant of Yang Duan
8	Yang Guangzhen	楊光震	?–?	son of Yang Guiqian
9	Yang Wenguang	楊文廣	?–?	son of Yang Guangzhen
10	Yang Weicong	楊惟聰	?–1125	son of Yang Wenguang
11	Yang Xuan	楊選	1125–1155	son of Yang Weicong
12	Yang Zhen	楊軫	?–?	son of Yang Xuan
-	Yang Shi	楊軾	?–?	co-ruler of Yang Zhen son of Yang Xuan
13	Yang Can	楊粲	1201–1233	adoptive son of Yang Zhen son of Yang Shi
14	Yang Jie	楊价	1233–1243	son of Yang Can
15	Yang Wen	楊文	1243–1265	son of Yang Jie
16	Yang Bangxian	楊邦憲	1265–1281	son of Yang Wen
17	Yang Hanying	楊漢英	1281–1316	also known as Yang Sayin-buqa (楊賽因不花) son of Yang Bangxian
18	Yang Jiazhen	楊嘉貞	?–?	also known as Yang Yanli-buqa (楊延禮不花) son of Yang Hanying
19	Yang Zhongyan	楊忠彥	?–?	son of Yang Jiazhen
20	Yang Yuanding	楊元鼎	?–1370	son of Yang Zhongyan
21	Yang Keng	楊鏗	1370–1399	descendant of Yang Bangxian
22	Yang Sheng	楊昇	1399–1441	son of Yang Keng
23	Yang Jiong	楊炯	1441–1442	grandson of Yang Sheng
24	Yang Gang	楊綱	1442–1449	son of Yang Sheng uncle of Yang Jiong
25	Yang Hui	楊輝	1449–1474	son of Yang Gang
26	Yang Ai	楊愛	1474–1497	son of Yang Hui
27	Yang Bin	楊斌	1497–1520	son of Yang Ai
28	Yang Xiang	楊相	1520–1543	son of Yang Bin
29	Yang Lie	楊烈	1543–1571	son of Yang Xiang
30	Yang Yinglong	楊應龍	1571–1595	son of Yang Lie
31	Yang Chaodong	楊朝棟	1595–1600	son of Yang Yinglong
