= Chiefdom of Sizhou =

Tujia or Han Tusi chiefdom (582–1413)

Chiefdom of Sizhou 思州土司
- 582–1413
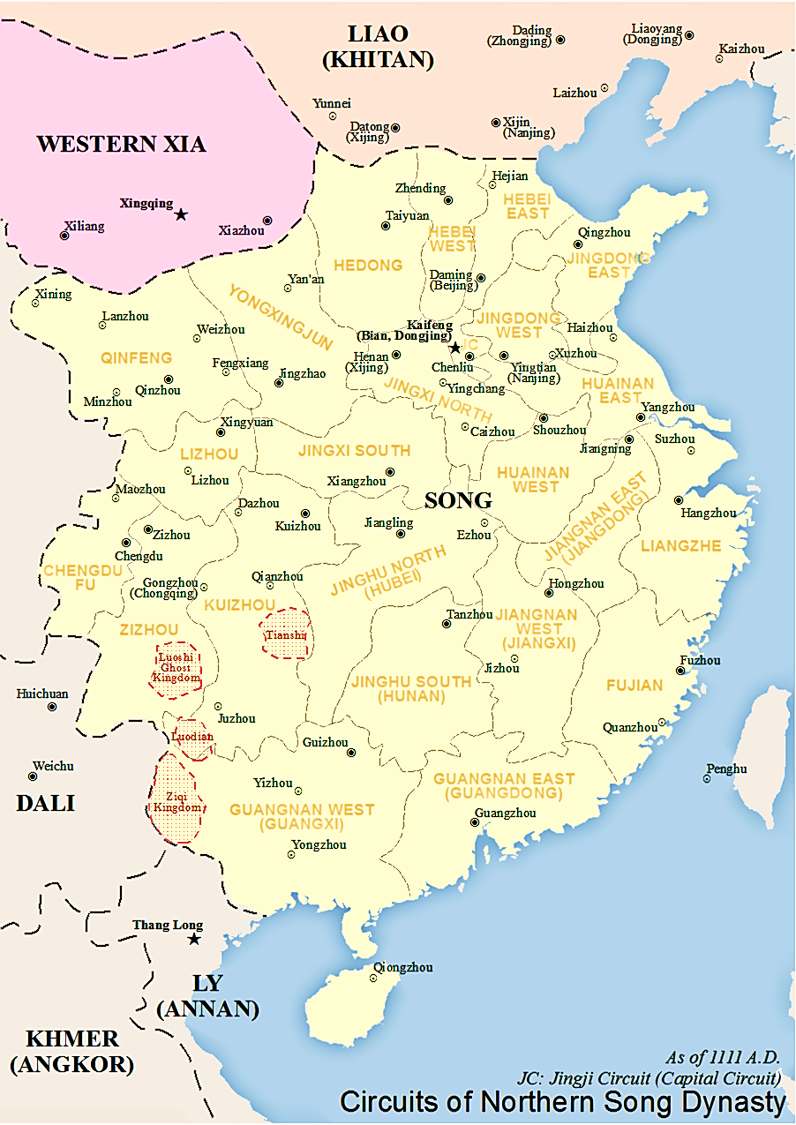
- Chiefdom of Sizhou in 1100 A.D. (Tianshi = Chiefdom of Sizhou)

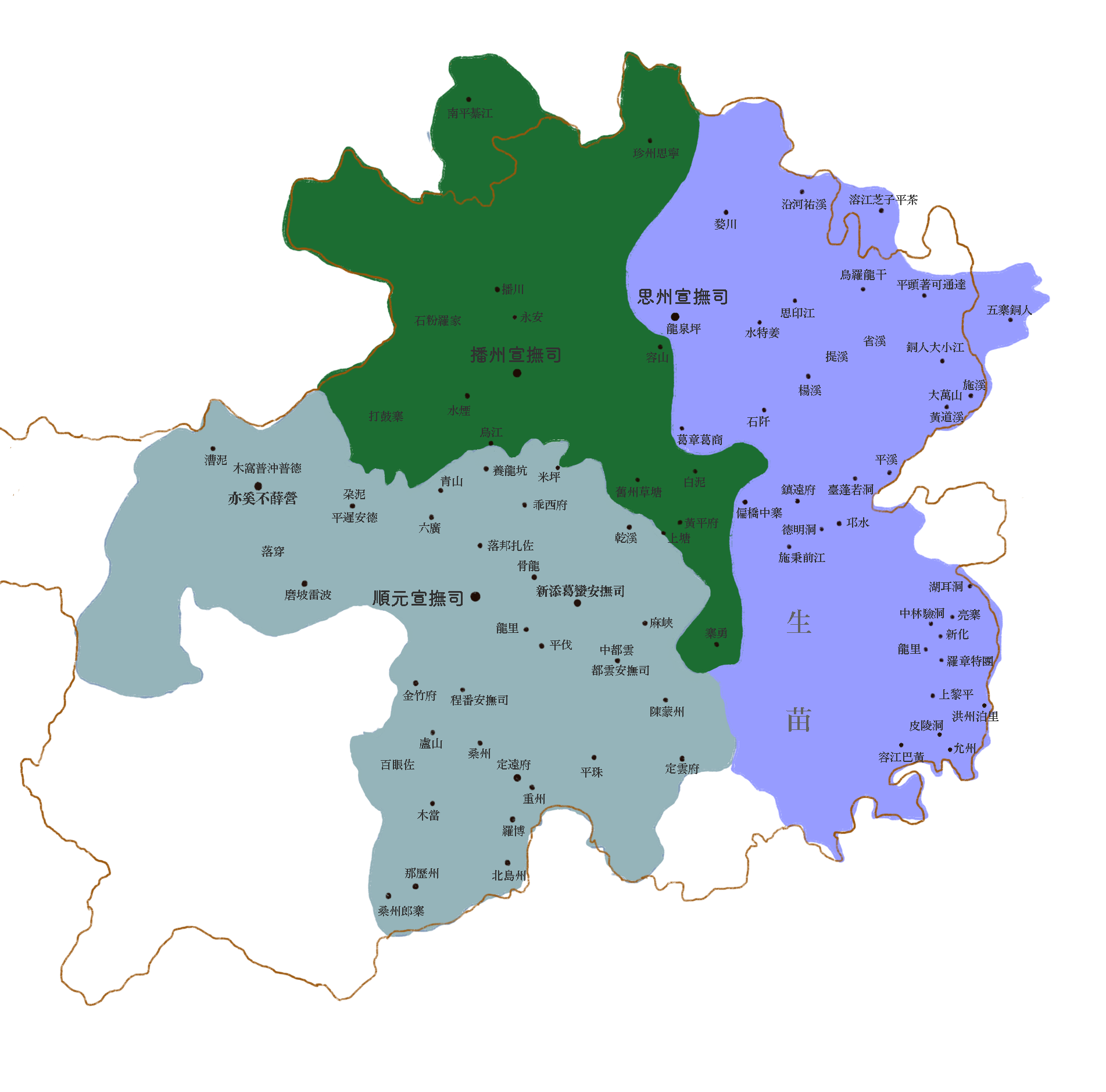
- Sizhou in purple and Bozhou in green
- Status: Native Chiefdom of China
- Capital: Sizhou (modern Cengong)
- Common languages: Tujia, Chinese, Hmong
- Religion: Nuoism, later also Confucianism
- Government: Monarchy
- Chieftain
  - 582–626: Tian Zongxian (first)
  - 1387–1413: Tian Chen (last)
- History
  - Established: 582
  - independence of Sinan: 1364
  - Annexed by Ming China: 1413
Succeeded by
Ming dynasty
- Today part of: China

Chiefdom of Sizhou (Chinese: 思州土司; pinyin: Sīzhōu Tǔsī), ruled by the Tian clan, was an autonomous Tusi chiefdom established by Tian Zongxian (田宗顯) during the Sui dynasty. After he conquered the Qianzhong area (present-day eastern Guizhou Province), Tian Zongxian was recognized as the hereditary ruler of the region by the Sui court in 582.

Sizhou, Bozhou, Shuidong and Shuixi were called "Four Great Native Chiefdom in Guizhou" (贵州四大土司) by Chinese. "Liangguang [ruled by] Cen and Huang, Sizhou and Bozhou [ruled by] Tian and Yang" (Chinese: 两广岑黄，思播田杨; pinyin: Liǎngguǎng Cén Huáng, Sī Bō Tián Yáng), an idiom current among Southwestern Mandarin speakers, proved that the Tian clan was once one of the most powerful clans in Southwestern China.

== Origin ==
The Tian clan claimed to be descendants of Han Chinese in their genealogy book; however the authenticity needed to be verified. Modern scholars stated that Tian Zongxian was either Han Chinese or Tujia.

== History ==
The Chiefdom of Sizhou was established during the Sui dynasty when the first chieftain Tian Zongxian occupied Qianzhong area (黔中, modern-day eastern Guizhou) in southwest China. It lasted for about 831 years over 26 generations through the Sui, Tang, Song, Yuan, and Ming dynasties.

In 1107, Sizhou chieftain Tian Yougong (田祐恭) acquiesced Song dynasty's overlordship, Sizhou came under the Chinese jimi system. In 1273, Sizhou surrendered to Yuan dynasty and came under the Chinese tusi system.

In 1364, Chiefdom of Sinan declared its independence from Sizhou. Tian Mao'an (田茂安), the Sinan chieftain, swore allegiance to Ming Yuzhen, while Sizhou came under Zhu Yuanzhang's tusi system. Sizhou attacked Sinan in 1367, killed Tian Mao'an's two sons, disturbed his ancestors' tombs. Tian Mao'an died soon after this battle, his successor Tian Renzhi (田仁智) switched allegiance to Ming court, Zhu Yuanzhang ordered them to cease fire.

However, the two clans had been feuding ever since, they were waging an endless war. Sizhou attacked Sinan in 1411, Tian Zongding (田宗鼎), the Sinan chief, was defeated and fled to Ming court for help. Five thousand Ming troops under general Gu Cheng (顧成) marched towards Sizhou and had it conquered. Tian Chen (田琛), the last Sizhou chieftain, was captured and executed in Beijing. Later, Tian Zongding was also found guilty (matricide) and executed in 1413. In the same year, Guizhou Province was created, both Sizhou and Sinan were fully annexed into the central bureaucratic system of the Ming dynasty.

== List of Sizhou chieftains ==
Below are Sizhou chieftains

No.	Name	Chinese	Reign	Notes
1	Tian Zongxian	田宗顯	582–626	
2	Tian Weikang	田惟康	626–660	eldest son of Tian Zongxian
3	Tian Yangming	田陽明	660–?	eldest son of Tian Weikang
4	Tian Kechang	田克昌	?–711	son of Tian Yangming
5	Tian Daoyuan	田道元	711–729	eldest son of Tian Kechang
6	Tian Gongrong	田公榮	729–773	son of Tian Daoyuan
7	Tian Zailong	田載龍	773–?	son of Tian Gongrong
8	Tian Shifeng	田時豐	?–870	son of Tian Zailong
9	Tian Zuoyu	田佐禹	870–?	third son of Tian Shifeng
10	Tian Fengxiang	田鳳翔	?–?	son of Tian Zuoyu
11	Tian Chengwen	田承文	?–?	eldest son of Tian Fengxiang
12	Tian Zhengyun	田正允	?–?	son of Tian Chengwen
13	Tian Shiru	田士儒	?–1098	son of Tian Zhengyun
14	Tian Yougong	田祐恭	1098–1135	eldest son of Tian Shiru
15	Tian Rurui	田汝瑞	1135–?	eldest son of Tian Yougong
16	Tian Zuheng	田祖衡	?–1224	eldest son of Tian Rurui
17	Tian Zonghan	田宗翰	1224–?	son of Tian Zuheng
18	Tian Qingyu	田慶裕	?–1275	son of Tian Zonghan
19	Tian Xinglong	田興隆	1275–?	son of Tian Qingyu
20	Tian Yingbing	田應丙	?–1278	eldest son of Tian Xinglong
21	Tian Jingxian	田景賢	1278–?	also known as Tian Jinxian (田謹賢) son of Tian Yingbing
22	Tian Weiyong	田惟墉	?–1365	eldest son of Tian Jingxian
23	Tian Maolie	田茂烈	1365–?	son of Tian Weiyong
24	Tian Renhou	田仁厚	?–1369	eldest son of Tian Maolie; Sinan declared independence in 1364
25	Tian Hongzheng	田弘政	1369–1387	son of Tian Renhou
26	Tian Chen	田琛	1387–1413	son of Tian Hongzheng executed by Yongle Emperor in 1413
