= Segati Kingdom =

The Segati Kingdom (Indonesian: Kerajaan Segati) was established some time in the 15th Century by Tuk Jayo Sati. It consisted of small villages 15 km south of present-day Langgam, which is on the Sungai Kampar (Kampar River). It is in Riau, an Indonesian province on the central eastern coast of Sumatra, facing the Strait of Malacca. The centre of the Kingdom was called Ranah Tanjung Bungo. When Tuk Jayo Tunggal took over from his father he moved the central Kingdom to Ranah Gunung Setawur, downstream of Segati river. The Kingdom gained considerable wealth in the spice trade, particularly pepper and chili. Segati is derived from the word for pepper, sekati lada. It is known that eight kings have ruled over Segati, but their exact dates are not known. It is estimated that the Kingdom ended in the 16th Century.

== History ==
The Segati Kingdom had a long history of trade with the Kuantan Kingdom. This trade began when envoys from Mount Sahilan came to Segati bringing black pepper. Tuk Jayo Tunggal bought the pepper and sold it in the city of Macang Pandak City, Kuantan. It is believed that pepper was first planted in Sumatra by Hindu migrants as early as 100 BC. Its vines grow high on the trunks of the thorny Dap-Dap trees. Envoys from Pagaruyung brought tin which was then sold by the King in Bandar Sangar, Kuala Kampar.

Trade began to flourish with Kuantan and Sangar when Tuk Jayo Alam took over from his father. During the Middle Ages pepper was extremely valuable and Malacca was a major supplier to the rest of the world. Malacca was a bustling seaport and in the 15th century, probably the most influential in Southeast Asia. This helps to explain the surprising importance of a small kingdom in the wilds of Sumatra.

The Kingdom of Gassib became jealous of its neighbor's new wealth and attacked it, forcing Jayo Alam south, where he set up the new kingdom of Negeri Segati. The kingdom remained there even after he successfully regained Ranah Gunung Setawar. Tuk Jayo Laut succeeded his father, the term laut, meaning sea, reflected his love of sailing. The trade continued to flourish for several more generations until, under the rule of Tuk Jayo Bedil (rifle), it became severely restricted. This was due to the Portuguese conquest of Malacca in 1511, and their attempt to control the spice trade.

As the first base of European Christian trading in Southeast Asia, Malacca was surrounded by native Muslim states. Portuguese Malacca was under almost constant attack. They endured years of battles started by Malay sultans who wanted to get rid of the Portuguese and reclaim their land. The Sultan, Mahmud Shah made several attempts to retake the capital.

At that time, a messenger came from King Tuk Sangar asking for help to attack the Portuguese in Malacca. Tuk Jayo rifle sent his armed forces, commanded by Panglima Kuntu, attacking Simpang Empat, on the island of Siapung Up (Serapung). At that time, the commander was very famous for his powerful navy, controlling Kuala Kampar. It is possible they sunk quite a few Portuguese ships.

Years later, a messenger came from Aceh demanding that the Kingdom convert to Islam. Aceh's demands were rejected by Tuk Jayo rifle. But Aceh continued on an expedition to conquer the east coast of Sumatra and eventually sent much of the pepper through its own port. After Segati was lost, Tuk Jayo fled to the Petalangan Napuh, then to Kuantan. Traces of the conquest of Aceh can still be encountered with places named Rencong Aceh, Aceh Base, and Lubuk Aceh. In the following years, Segati established a new country by the name of Tambak, and then Langgam.

== Rulers of Segati ==
1. Tuk Jayo Sati
2. Tuk Jayo Tunggal
3. Tuk Jayo Alam
4. Tuk Jayo Sea
5. High-Tuk Jayo
6. Tuk Jayo Dashing
7. Tuk Jayo Kolombai
8. Tuk Jayo rifle

== Segati today ==
Segati Kingdom is currently located in Langgam Segati Pelalawan. People here mostly live from farming, forestry and palm oil plantation. Acacia trees supply the raw material for paper. Segati forests are currently managed by PT. Siak Raya Timber (SRT) and also PT. Riau Andalan Pulp and Paper (RAPP), possibly illegally. Disputes are common between villagers and the RAPP, over land and tree planting in the area.
