= Luoshi Kingdom =

Luoshi Ghost Kingdom 羅氏鬼國
- 1042–1279
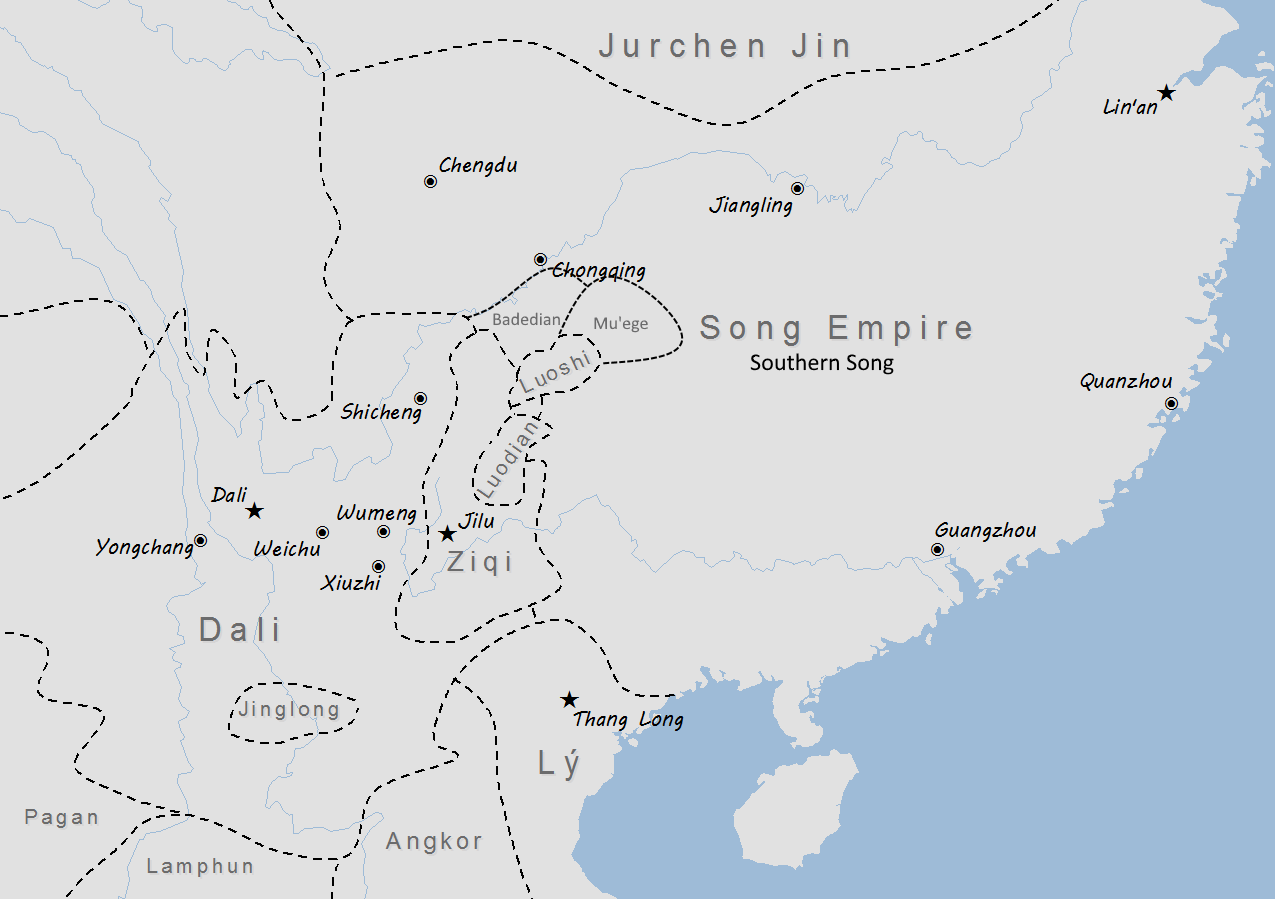
- Luoshi and neighboring Yi Kingdoms
- Status: Independent chiefdom (1042–1279); Native Chiefdom of China (1279–1698)
- Common languages: Nasu language
- Religion: Bimoism, Buddhism, later also Confucianism
- History
  - Established: 1042
  - Disestablished: 1279
Succeeded by
Mu'ege
- Today part of: China

The Luoshi Kingdom (Chinese: 羅氏國 / 羅施國), commonly referred to in Tang documents as the Luoshi Ghost Kingdom (Chinese: 羅氏鬼國; "Spirit kingdom of the Luo Clan"), was a Nasu speaking ethnic Yi state located in modern-day Guizhou during the Tang and Song dynasties. The people practiced Bimoism, an indigenous faith that used shamanist rituals; its ruler called itself the "Great Ghost Lord" (大鬼主). The nucleus of the kingdom was located on the west bank of the Yachi River.

== History ==
Coinciding with the rise of the Dali Kingdom, the Black Mywa (ancestors of the modern Yi people) that crossed the Wumeng Mountains began flourishing in Guizhou. A Black Mywa from the Mo clan named Tuoazhe settled in a region which his descendants would call Luodian.

In the early Song dynasty, the Luodian king retreated from Shuixi (northwestern Guizhou), the Black Mywa tribes of Azhe became the sole rulers in the area with head chief Degai (德盖) as their leader. When the Song dynasty attempted to penetrate into the Shuixi area by establishing the province of Yaozhou in the area, Degai became the governor. After taking office, Degai began to call himself the "Luoshi Ghost Lord" and used the pre-existing confederacy to make a quasi-independent state, and his descendants called the state the Luoshi Ghost Kingdom.

In 1256, when the Mongols attacked Yunnan, the Southern Song dynasty sent an envoy to the state to persuade the Luoshi chief to fight the Mongol armies. In 1266, the Southern Song bestowed the kingdom the governor of Huazhou, another province located in Guizhou. By the time the Southern Song collapsed, the Luoshi pledged allegiance to the Yuan dynasty. In 1292, the former lands of the Luoshi Kingdom were dissolved and put into the hands of the Shuixi tusi.

== Luoshi-Luodian differentiation ==
Both classical and contemporary Chinese research have a hard time differentiating between the Luoshi Kingdom and its Yi-speaking neighbor, Luodian Kingdom. The relationship between the two countries is obscure and different academic circles have different interpretations. The general consensus is: during the Five Dynasties and Ten Kingdoms period, the pre-existing Luodian Kingdom fractured into several small kingdoms, one of which is the Luoshi. Both the Luoshi and a weakened Luodian took turns leading the various tribes of Guizhou and Yunnan, and often came into conflict with each other.
