= Chiefdom of Shuidong =

Yi Tusi chiefdom (975–1630)

Chiefdom of Shuidong 水東土司
- 975–1630
- Status: Native Chiefdom of China
- Capital: Shuidong (present day Kaiyang)
- Common languages: Chinese, Bouyei, Hmong
- Government: Monarchy
- Chieftain
  - 975–?: Song Jingyang (first)
  - 1623–1630: Song Siyin (last)
- History
  - Established: 975
  - Annexed by Ming China: 1630
Succeeded by
Ming dynasty
- Today part of: China

Chiefdom of Shuidong (simplified Chinese: 水东土司; traditional Chinese: 水東土司; pinyin: Shǔidōng Tǔsī), ruled by the Song clan, was an autonomous Tusi chiefdom established by Song Jingyang (宋景陽) during the Song dynasty. After he conquered the Manzhou Prefecture (蠻州, centred on modern Kaiyang County) from the Yi people, Song Jingyang was recognized as the hereditary ruler of the region by the Song court in 975.

Shuidong was one of the most powerful clans in Southwestern China; Bozhou, Sizhou, Shuixi and Shuidong were called "Four Great Native Chiefdom in Guizhou" (贵州四大土司) by Chinese. Shuidong joined the She-An Rebellion in 1623. After the rebellion was put down, Shuidong was annexed and ruled directly by Ming China.

== Origin ==
The Song clan claimed to be the descendants of a Han Chinese named Song Ding (宋鼎) in their genealogy book; however the authenticity needed to be verified. Modern scholars stated that Song Jingyang was a Han Chinese, Bouyei or Miao.

== History ==
In 1303, Song Achong of Shuidong surrendered to the Yuan dynasty, Shuidong came under the Chinese tusi system. In 1371, Song Mongoldai of Shuidong surrendered to the Ming dynasty.

During the Ming conquest of Yunnan, Liu Shuzhen (劉淑貞) was the female regent of Shuidong, while Shuixi (Mu'ege) was ruled by the regent mother She Xiang (奢香). In 1382, She Xiang decided to rebelled against Ming China because she was tortured by the Chinese general Ma Ye (馬曄). Liu Shuzhen persuaded her not to do. Liu came to Nanjing to reported Ma's behavior. An investigation was carried out, Ma was rebuked and recalled in 1384.

In 1413, the province of Guizhou was created. The capital of Shuidong, Guizhou City (present day Guiyang), was chosen the site of the province's capital. Thirty thousand Chinese soldiers were settled in eastern Guizhou Province.

Since 1373, each Shuidong rulers held the title Guizhou Xuanwei tongzhi (貴州宣慰同知); while each Shuixi rulers were granted the title Guizhou Xuanweishi (貴州宣慰使), both were highest aboriginal governors of Guizhou Province. However, the rank of Shuidong rulers were lower than Shuixi rulers'. Initially, the official residences of Shuixi and Shuidong rulers were in Guizhou City, Shuixi rulers were not allowed to go back to his chiefdom freely. This rule was abolished by Ming court in 1479, since then, Shuixi rulers spent most of their life in Shuixi. The power of Shuidong rulers soon expanded rapidly, Shuixi prolonged conflict with Shuidong.

A Miao rebellion against Shuidong ruler broke out in 1513. Song Ran (宋然) of Shuidong was defeated and fled. Though Ming court ordered Shuixi to suppress, An Guirong (安貴榮) of Shuixi was unwilling to do so, because the rebellion was tacit backed by Shuixi. Finally, An Guirong put down the rebellion, since then, Chiefdom of Shuidong went into a slow decline.

The Shuidong ruler Song Cheng'en (宋承恩) was a son-in-law of Bozhou chief Yang Yinglong (楊應龍). When Yang rebelled against Ming China, Song Cheng'en refused to join the rebellion. He was captured and imprisoned in Hailongtun until the rebellion was put down.

The Shuidong ruler Song Wanhua (宋萬化) joined the She-An Rebellion, he was captured and executed in 1623. His son Song Siyin (宋嗣殷) rebelled against Ming China, but was put down in 1630. In the same year, Shuidong was fully annexed into the central bureaucratic system of the Ming dynasty.

== List of Shuidong chieftains ==
Below are Shuidong chieftains

Name	Chinese	Reign	Notes
Song Jingyang	宋景陽	975–987	
Song Cunxiao	宋存孝	987–?	
Song Yu	宋裕	?–?	
Song Qixiang	宋其相	?–?	
Song Xiangxuan	宋祥宣	?–?	
Song Xiding	宋錫定	1151–?	
Song Wanming	宋萬明	1166–?	
Song Jixing	宋基興	?–?	
Song Yonggao	宋永高	?–?	
Song Sheng	宋勝	?–?	
Song Ju	宋聚	?–?	
Song Chaomei	宋朝美	?–?	
Song Longji	宋隆濟	?–1304	
Song Achong	宋阿重	1304–?	
Song Juhun	宋居混	?–?	
Song Qin	宋欽	?–1381	Mongolian name: Song Mongoldai (宋蒙古歹)
Liu Shuzhen	劉淑貞	1381–?	female regent
Song Cheng	宋誠	1381–1388	
Song Bin	宋斌	1388–1443	
Song Ang	宋昂	1443–1484	
Song Ran	宋然	1484–1513	
Song Ren	宋仁	1513–1559	
Song Chu	宋儲	?–?	
Song Gao	宋鎬	?–?	
Song Delong	宋德隆	?–?	
Song Kui	宋夔	?–?	
Song Yiqing	宋一清	1559–1574	regent
Song Demao	宋德懋	1574–?	
Song Dexian	宋德賢	?–?	
Song Cheng'en	宋承恩	1582–1609	
Song Zhenxiang	宋真相	1609–?	regent
Song Shixiang	宋師相	?–?	regent
Song Wanhua	宋萬化	1621–1623	
Song Siyin	宋嗣殷	1623–1630	
