= List of World Heritage Sites in China =

The United Nations Educational, Scientific and Cultural Organization (UNESCO) World Heritage Sites are places of importance to cultural or natural heritage as described in the UNESCO World Heritage Convention, established in 1972. Cultural heritage consists of monuments (such as architectural works, monumental sculptures, or inscriptions), groups of buildings, and sites (including archaeological sites). Natural features (consisting of physical and biological formations), geological and physiographical formations (including habitats of threatened species of animals and plants), and natural sites which are important from the point of view of science, conservation or natural beauty, are defined as natural heritage. China accepted the convention on 12 December 1985, making its sites eligible for inclusion on the list.

China has 61 World Heritage Sites on the list, ranking second in the world, just below Italy with 62 sites. Of these 61 sites, 42 are listed for their cultural, 15 for their natural, and 4 sites for both cultural and natural significance. In addition, China also has 60 sites on its tentative list.

The first sites in China were added to the list in 1987 when six sites were inscribed. The most recent additions took place in 2026 when the Jingdezhen Handicraft Porcelain Industry Sites were listed. The Silk Roads: the Routes Network of Chang'an-Tianshan Corridor is a transnational site and is shared with Kazakhstan and Kyrgyzstan.

Location of World Heritage Sites in China. Red dots represent cultural sites, green natural, and blue mixed sites. The Grand Canal is shown in purple. The Migratory Bird Sanctuaries are shown in orange. The sites of the Silk Roads are shown in turquoise. The Forbidden City, Zhoukoudian, Summer Palace, Temple of Heaven, Ming tombs, Eastern and Western of the Qing tombs, Beijing Central Axis, and the Badaling section of the Great Wall are all located in or near Beijing.

== World Heritage Sites ==
UNESCO lists sites under ten criteria; each entry must meet at least one of the criteria. Criteria i through vi are cultural, and vii through x are natural.

* Transnational site

World Heritage Sites
Site	Image	Location (prov. level)	Year listed	UNESCO data	Description
Mount Taishan	A long stone staircase on the mountain slope	Shandong	1987	437; i, ii, iii, iv, v, vi, vii (mixed)	Mount Tai is the most important of the five Sacred Mountains of China. It is a giant rock mass covered with dense vegetation, towering over a surrounding plateau. Its natural beauty has inspired people for millennia. It was a site of the imperial cult for over 2,000 years, with emperors themselves performing Feng Shan sacrifices. There are numerous temples, stelae, and stone inscriptions on the mountain slopes, both Buddhist and Taoist. The mountain is connected with a series of historical events of China, including the emergence of Confucianism, the unification of the country under the Qin dynasty, and the emergence of writing and literature.
The Great Wall	The Great Wall on a mountain ridge	Beijing, Hebei, Gansu	1987	438; i, ii, iii, iv, vi (cultural)	The Great Wall is a series of fortifications in northern China with a total length of over 20,000 km (12,000 mi). Construction of the Wall, intended as a defense against the invaders from the north, begun in the 3rd century BCE under the Emperor Qin Shi Huang, who connected earlier existing sections. Work on the Great Wall continued until the 17th century under the Ming dynasty. The Wall comprises fortresses, watchtowers, passes, and shelters along the way. It has featured prominently in literature for centuries. Three sections of the wall are listed: the terminuses at Jiayuguan City and Shanhai Pass, and the Badaling section (pictured) near Beijing.
Imperial Palaces of the Ming and Qing Dynasties in Beijing and Shenyang	People in front of a ceremonial hall with a long roof with orange tiles	Beijing, Liaoning	1987	439bis; i, ii, iii, iv (cultural)	The Forbidden City in Beijing (the Hall of Supreme Harmony pictured) was the seat of the Ming and Qing dynasties from 1416 to 1911. The palaces in Beijing and Shenyang, where the Mukden Palace was added to the site in 2004, represent the development of palatial architecture in China and the fusion of Han, Manchu, Mongolian, and Tibetan cultures and influences, especially in the 17th and 18th centuries. The palace complexes are filled with works of art and also demonstrate the traditions of shamanism practiced by the Manchu.
Mogao Caves	A multi-storey entrance to the cave in the shape of a temple	Gansu	1987	440; i, ii, iii, iv, v, vi (cultural)	The caves in the Dunhuang oasis contain an outstanding collection of Buddhist art spanning from the 4th to 14th centuries. They reflect cultural exchanges between China, India, and Central Asia, as well as the art of various ethnic minorities of China. They also provide insight into the life and culture of the Sui, Tang, and Song dynasties. From the end of the 19th century until 1930, the caves were occupied by Buddhist monks. The Dunhuang manuscripts, one of the most famous finds, were discovered in one of the caves in 1900.
Mausoleum of the First Qin Emperor	Several life-size terracotta statues of soldiers	Shaanxi	1987	441; i, iii, iv, vi (cultural)	The mausoleum was constructed for Qin Shi Huang of the Qin dynasty, the first Emperor of China and unifier of the country, who died in 210 BCE. The massive mausoleum comprises the grave mound with a height above 50 m (160 ft) and numerous accompanying pits with funerary objects. Of these, the most famous is the Terracotta Army (pictured), thousands of life-sized and realistic terracotta statues of warriors, as well as horses and chariots. The site was discovered in 1974.
Peking Man Site at Zhoukoudian	Entrance to the archaeological site with a large sculpture of the Peking Man	Beijing	1987	449; iii, vi (cultural)	Zhoukoudian (entrance pictured) is an archaeological site with limestone caves that preserved remains of ancient humans, tools, and animals from the Pleistocene. Excavations have been going on since the early 20th century. The finds include the so-called Peking Man, a subspecies of Homo erectus who lived 700,000 to 200,000 years ago, archaic Homo sapiens from about 200,000 to 100,000 years ago, and modern humans dating back to 30,000 years ago. They provide an important insight into the human evolution and the life of human communities in Asia.
Mount Huangshan	Mountain with several granite peaks, partially covered by clouds	Anhui	1990	547bis; ii, vii, x (mixed)	Huangshan, or Yellow Mountain, is a granite mountain range with numerous peaks, boulders, caves, waterfalls, and rock formations. It has ancient pine trees and is home to rich assemblies of bryophytes and ferns. There are several endemic plant species. The scenic landscape of the mountain has been inspiring the Chinese imagination since at least the time of the Tang dynasty of the 8th century. It has featured in poems and paintings, having a school of painting named after it. A minor boundary modification of the site took place in 2012.
Jiuzhaigou Valley Scenic and Historic Interest Area	Trees in autumn colours around a blue-water pond with tree trunks inside	Sichuan	1992	637; vii (natural)	The valley is surrounded by jagged mountain peaks reaching up to 4,800 m (15,700 ft) high. There are numerous karst features, including caves, limestone terraces, as well as pools and waterfalls, resulting in a scenic beauty. The valley has a series of diverse forest ecosystems that are home to some 140 bird species, the giant panda, and Sichuan takin.
Huanglong Scenic and Historic Interest Area	A series of travertine pools with blue water in a forest area	Sichuan	1992	638; vii (natural)	The mountain landscape has glaciers, diverse forest ecosystems, waterfalls, and karst formations. A special feature is a series of travertine terraces and lakes (pictured). The area is home to the giant panda and golden snub-nosed monkey.
Wulingyuan Scenic and Historic Interest Area	Landscape with numerous sandstone pillars partially covered in vegetation	Hunan	1992	640; vii (natural)	The defining feature of the landscape is a collection of more than 3,000 quartz sandstone pillars and peaks, some of which are more than 200 m (660 ft) tall. Other interesting landforms include karst caves with calcite deposits, gorges, ravines, pools, waterfalls, and two large natural stone bridges. The area is home to the Asian black bear, dhole, and water deer.
Mountain Resort and its Outlying Temples, Chengde	A temple in red and white colours on the slope of a hill	Hebei	1994	703; ii, iv (cultural)	The resort was built in the 18th century as the summer palace for the Qing dynasty emperors. At the same time it functioned as a base to strengthen administration in the border regions. The palaces, temples, and gardens are designed to be integrated harmoniously with the natural environment, following the principles of feng shui. Several temples are in the styles of ethnic minorities of the empire. The Putuo Zongcheng Temple in the Tibetan style is pictured.
Temple and Cemetery of Confucius and the Kong Family Mansion in Qufu	An entrance to a temple with red door and yellow roof	Shandong	1994	704; i, iv, vi (cultural)	Qufu was the birthplace of Confucius, a great Chinese philosopher, educator, and politician, who died in the 5th century BCE. His teachings, known as Confucianism, were greatly influential in China, Korea, Japan, Vietnam, as well as in the 18th century Europe during the Age of Enlightenment. The temple was originally built in 478 BCE and was rebuilt and expanded over centuries. The continuous support of the emperors meant that the finest artisans worked on the complex which includes the Temple of Confucius (pictured), the Kong Family Mansion, and the Cemetery of Confucius where he and more than 100,000 of his descendants are buried.
Ancient Building Complex in the Wudang Mountains	A Chinese temple with a prominent staircase in front and a hill in the background	Hubei	1994	705; i, ii, vi (cultural)	The religious complex in the Wudang Mountains was established as a centre for Taoism under the Tang dynasty in the 7th century. It reached its peak under the Ming dynasty between the 14th and 17th centuries. Today, the complex preserves 53 palaces, temples, and shrines in nine different architectural styles, including those from the Yuan and Qing dynasties. The buildings represent the highest architectural and artistic standards of China through centuries and were influential in the development of public and religious architecture in the country. The Purple Cloud Temple is pictured.
Historic Ensemble of the Potala Palace, Lhasa	A palace on the slopes of a hill, painted white and red and with many windows	Tibet	1994	707ter; i, iv, vi (cultural)	The palace (pictured) in Lhasa served as the winter residence of the Dalai Lamas from the 7th century. It represents the role that Tibetan Buddhism had in the administration and governance of the Tibetan society. The vast palace is filled with works of art, including murals, painted scrolls, sculptures, and porcelain, and has a collection of important historic documents. In 2000 and 2001, respectively, the site was expanded to include the Jokhang temple monastery from the 7th century and Norbulingka, the summer residence of the Dalai Lamas from the 18th century.
Lushan National Park	Mountain peaks with trees covered in clouds	Jiangxi	1996	778; ii, iii, iv, vi (cultural)	The cultural landscape around Mount Lu and Poyang Lake has been inspiring philosophers and artists for more than two millennia and was the cultural centre of southern China. There are more than 200 historic buildings in the national park, including Buddhist and Taoist temples and sites of Confucianist teachings, in particular the White Deer Grotto Academy. The stone arch Guanyin Bridge from the Song dynasty is important in the history of Chinese civil engineering.
Mount Emei Scenic Area, including Leshan Giant Buddha Scenic Area	Tourists watching a giant Buddha statue carved in a stone hill near a river	Sichuan	1996	779; iv, vi, x (mixed)	Mount Emei is one of the four sacred Buddhist mountains in China. It is the site of the first Buddhist temple in China, constructed when the religion was introduced from India via the Silk Road in the 1st century CE. Today, there are over 30 temples from different periods on the mountain, as well as several important monuments. The best known is the Leshan Giant Buddha (pictured), a 71 m (233 ft) tall statue carved in stone in the 8th century. The mountain is also important for its animal and plant biodiversity, with forest types spanning from subtropical evergreen broad-leaved forest at the bottom to subalpine conifer forest at the highest elevations.
Old Town of Lijiang	Traditional houses on both sides of a stream, crossed by a stone bridge	Yunnan	1997	811bis; ii, iv, v (cultural)	Located on the meeting point between the Silk Road and the ancient Tea Horse Road, Lijiang was an important trade centre between Sichuan, Yunnan, and Tibet from the 12th century onward. It was a meeting point of Han, Nakhi, Bai, and Tibetan people and other communities, which is reflected in particular local architecture, urban planning, and traditions. The city also demonstrates a harmonious coexistence of Confucianism, Taoism, and Buddhism. A prominent feature of the city is its traditional water supply system, with waters from the mountains being collected in the Black Dragon Pool. They are then distributed through a series of canals and channels. A minor boundary modification of the site took place in 2012.
Ancient City of Ping Yao	A multi-storey Chinese tower with people passing underneath	Shanxi	1997	812; ii, iii, iv (cultural)	The city of Pingyao was founded under the Ming dynasty in the 14th century. The city centre (market tower pictured) is a well-preserved example of a Han Chinese traditional city and it demonstrates the evolution of architectural styles under the Ming and Qing dynasties. In the 19th and early 20th centuries, it was the major banking centre of the country. In addition to the old city centre, two temples are listed as well, the Zhenguo Temple and the Shuanglin Temple. Both are important due to their architecture and art collections.
Classical Gardens of Suzhou	A Chinese garden with a bridge over a pond and pavilions on both sides	Jiangsu	1997	813bis i, ii, iii, iv, v (cultural)	The design of Chinese gardens has been developing for more than two millennia. The gardens in the city of Suzhou demonstrate some of the finest examples of the form, including water features, rock formations, pavilions, bridges, and meticulously arranged plants, designed to create harmonious and miniature landscapes that reflect the natural world. Out of more than fifty such gardens in the city, four were listed in 1997, and a further five were added in 2000. They date between the 11th and 19th centuries. The Humble Administrator's Garden is pictured.
Summer Palace, an Imperial Garden in Beijing	A tower next to a lake with a boat, trees in the background	Beijing	1998	880; i, ii, iii (cultural)	The palace was conceived next to the Kunming Lake in Beijing in the mid-18th century under the Qing Qianlong Emperor. It is a prominent example of a Chinese garden, with water features, pavilions, temples, and bridges. It had an important influence on subsequent garden designs. It was destroyed during the Second Opium War in 1860, restored in 1888, again damaged during the Boxer Rebellion in 1900, restored, and has been a public park since 1924.
Temple of Heaven: an Imperial Sacrificial Altar in Beijing	A circular three-storied temple on a stone platform	Beijing	1998	881; i, ii, iii (cultural)	The Temple of Heaven in Beijing is the most representative of the sacrificial buildings in China. Its design and symbolic layout had an important influence on subsequent buildings. The original temple was constructed in 1420 under the Ming dynasty, together with the Forbidden City. The current layout dates to 1749, following a renovation under the Qing dynasty. The Hall of Prayer for Good Harvests, where the emperors offered sacrifice to Heaven for abundant harvests, is pictured.
Mount Wuyi	A river with stone formations and lush forest on the banks	Fujian	1999	911bis; ii, vi, vii, x (mixed)	The area of Mount Wuyi preserves the largest mainly intact examples of subtropical and rainforests in China. The forests are rich in biodiversity and home to several relict species. Along the Nine Bend River (pictured), there are high cliffs and sandstone rock formations. There is an archaeological site of a Han dynasty administrative capital from the 1st century BCE. There are also several temples and Confucianist learning centres that were associated with the development of the Neo-Confucianist philosophy in the 11th century. A minor boundary modification of the site took place in 2017.
Dazu Rock Carvings	Several large Buddhist statues carved in a hill slope. Background is painted.	Chongqing	1999	912: i, ii, iii (cultural)	This site comprises five clusters with rock reliefs near the city of Chongqing. They date from the 9th to the 13th centuries and depict Confucianist, Taoist, and Buddhist motifs, side by side. This demonstrates the harmonious coexistence of these three religions in China. There are also secular motifs. The carvings represent the pinnacle of Chinese rock art. The group at Mount Baoding is pictured.
Mount Qingcheng and the Dujiangyan Irrigation System	Entrance to a Chinese temple, highly decorated gates	Sichuan	2000	1001; ii, iv, vi (cultural)	Mount Qingcheng is the site where the philosopher Zhang Daoling founded the doctrine of Chinese Taoism in the 2nd century BCE. There are 11 important Taoist temples (entrance to one of the temples pictured) on the mountain slopes, dating to different periods. The Dujiangyan Irrigation System was originally constructed in the 3rd century BCE to control flooding and to irrigate farmland, without the use of dams. It demonstrates the advanced technological stage of ancient China. The system was modified and enlarged in the following centuries.
Ancient Villages in Southern Anhui – Xidi and Hongcun	A row of residential buildings next to a body of water	Anhui	2000	1002; iii, iv, v (cultural)	These two villages (Hongcun pictured) represent typical villages of Anhui as they were between the 14th and 20th centuries, a type of settlement that has largely disappeared. The villages were developed by successful officials or merchants returning home after assignments. The layout and the buildings reflect the social structure of feudal China and its values based on Confucianism and Neo-Confucianism.
Longmen Grottoes	Large size Buddhist statues carved in stone from a cliff wall	Henan	2000	1003; i, ii, iii (cultural)	The grottoes carved into the sandstone cliffs along the Yi River near the ancient capital of Luoyang contain a vast collection of Buddhist rock carvings and statues. Most date to the late Northern Wei and early Tang dynasties, between the 5th and mid-8th centuries. They represent a high point of Chinese rock art and were influential in the development of sculptural art in the wider region.
Imperial Tombs of the Ming and Qing Dynasties	A stone path leading to a mausoleum	Beijing, Liaoning, Jiangsu	2000	1004ter; i, ii, iii, iv, vi (cultural)	This site comprises 14 tombs or tomb clusters belonging to the emperors of the last two Chinese dynasties, the Ming and Qing, who ruled between the 14th and 20th centuries. The basic design of the tombs, in line with the feng shui principles, was established with the Xiao Mausoleum (pictured), the tomb of the first Ming emperor. The Qing rulers kept the Ming design and added new elements from the Manchurian culture. The tombs have a sacred way lined with stone sculptures and monuments, where the ceremonies were held. Three properties were listed in 2000, with further tombs added in 2003 and 2004.
Yungang Grottoes	Buddhist statues carved in a stone cliff	Shanxi	2001	1039; i, ii, iii, iv (cultural)	The grottoes with Buddhist sculptures are an outstanding example of Chinese rock-cut architecture. They date to the mid-5th and early 6th centuries during the Northern Wei dynasty. There are 252 caves with over 50,000 statues. They show influences of South and Central Asian art but with Chinese traditions. The grottoes were important in the development of Buddhist art in China.
Three Parallel Rivers of Yunnan Protected Areas	A narrow river gorge between mountains covered in forest	Yunnan	2003	1083bis; vii, viii, ix, x (natural)	In the mountains of Yunnan, the upper streams of three major Asian rivers, the Yangtze, Mekong, and Salween, run roughly parallel through steep gorges. The mountainous area was created in the collision of the Indian plate with the Eurasian plate in the last 50 million years. There are mountains reaching above 6,000 m (20,000 ft) in height, glaciers, alpine karst, and danxia landforms. Located at the meeting point of East Asia, Southeast Asia, and the Tibetan Plateau, and with habitats at various elevations, the area is a biodiversity hotspot and one of the most species-rich area in the temperate zone. The Tiger Leaping Gorge along the Yangtze River is pictured. A minor boundary modification of the site took place in 2010.
Capital Cities and Tombs of the Ancient Koguryo Kingdom	A large circular stone tomb	Jilin	2004	1135; i, ii, iii, iv, v (cultural)	The Koguryo or Goguryeo kingdom ruled over parts of northern China and the northern half of the Korean Peninsula from 277 BCE to 668 CE. This site comprises three archaeological sites, the Wunü Mountain City, Gungnae, and Hwando, which served as capitals during the early and middle periods of the kingdom, until the capital was moved to Pyongyang in 427 CE. There are several tombs of royals and nobles (the Tomb of the General pictured). The paintings and inscriptions in the burial chambers indicate the influence of the Chinese culture on the Koguryo, who did not develop independent writing. The scenes depict daily life, sports, hunting, and mythological motifs.
Historic Centre of Macao	Ruins of a church, with the front facade rather preserved	Macau	2005	1110; ii, iii, iv, vi (cultural)	Macau was founded as a Portuguese port in the 16th century and returned to Chinese sovereignty in 1999. The city played an important role in trade and cultural exchange between China and the West. There are numerous historic buildings in the city, with European and Chinese ones standing side by side. Macau saw the introduction of some of the first western-style buildings to China, such as a theatre, churches, fortresses, a university, and a hospital. The Ruins of Saint Paul's, the remains of a Baroque church, are pictured.
Yin Xu	A replica of a large bronze vessel on a stone platform	Henan	2006	1114; ii, iii, iv, vi (cultural)	The archaeological site of Yinxu, near modern Anyang, was the capital city of the late Shang dynasty, from the 14th to the 11th centuries BCE. Excavations uncovered remains of a palace and of numerous houses, as well as royal and other tombs. The artifacts found include ritual bronzes (a replica pictured) which illustrate the high sophistication of the Shang culture, and large collections of oracle bones, the earliest evidence of systematic written Chinese.
Sichuan Giant Panda Sanctuaries - Wolong, Mt Siguniang and Jiajin Mountains	A close-up of a panda bear cub	Sichuan	2006	1213; x (natural)	This site comprises seven nature reserves and nine scenic parks that cover most of the last remaining contiguous habitat of the giant panda (a cub pictured). In view of biodiversity, the area is one of the richest in the world in the temperate zone, and is home to threatened species such as the red panda, snow leopard, and clouded leopard. From the botanical perspective, there is a high diversity of magnolia, bamboo, rhododendron, and orchid species.
Kaiping Diaolou and Villages	Several watchtowers next to a field	Guangdong	2007	1112; ii, iii, iv (cultural)	Diaolou are multi-storey watchtowers, some of which were also residential, characteristic of the Kaiping area. They originate in the time of the Ming dynasty, when they served as fortifications against local bandits. Most of the current diaolou date from the late 19th and early 20th centuries and are associated with the Overseas Chinese returning home and bringing back architectural styles especially from North America, South Asia, and Australasia. They are made of rammed earth, bricks, stone, and concrete. Four diaolou clusters and villages are listed, Zili Village is pictured.
South China Karst	Conical mountains with a river in front	Yunnan, Guizhou, Chongqing, Guangxi	2007	1248bis; vii, viii (natural)	This site comprises some of the most prominent examples of humid tropical to subtropical karst landforms, including tower karst, giant sinkholes, natural bridges, gorges, and caves with speleothems. They demonstrate the natural beauty of karst landscapes and are important in view of scientific studies of natural processes that shape them. The clusters around Shilin, Libo, and Wulong were listed in 2007. Four additional clusters, including the one around Guilin (pictured), were added in 2014.
Fujian Tulou	Several large circular buildings, photo from above	Fujian	2008	1113; iii, iv, v (cultural)	A tolou is a type of large earthen buildings, circular or with a square plan, and several stories high. They are inward-looking and could house up to 800 people each. They are characteristic of south-eastern China, where they were constructed between the 13th and 20th centuries, with the most elaborate examples dating to the 17th and 18th centuries. While the exterior is plain and in a defensive function, the interior is typically highly decorated. The World Heritage Site lists 46 tolou in 14 clusters (Tianluokeng tulou cluster pictured).
Mount Sanqingshan National Park	Granite rock formations partially covered by trees	Jiangxi	2008	1292; vii (natural)	The natural park is listed for its natural beauty. The characteristic features are numerous granite rock formations, such as pillars, that are partially overgrown with vegetation. Some of the formations have shapes that resemble human figures and animals. There are also springs, lakes, and waterfalls.
Mount Wutai	Temple buildings with red-painted walls near a body of water	Shanxi	2009	1279; ii, iii, iv, vi (cultural)	Mount Wutai is a sacred Buddhist mountain. The cultural landscape has been shaped by the imperial patronage of the site for over a millennium. There are numerous monasteries, statues, inscriptions, and stelae. Some of the timber buildings date back to the Tang dynasty. The mountain was influential in the development of Buddhism in China.
Historic Monuments of Dengfeng in "The Centre of Heaven and Earth"	A temple with red-painted walls and a lion statue in front	Henan	2010	1305rev; iii, vi (cultural)	Dengfeng, located at the foot of the sacred Mount Song, was traditionally seen as "the centre of heaven and earth" by the Chinese, as the only place where astronomical observations were considered to be accurate. Due to its status, Dengfeng enjoyed the patronage of the emperors, who commissioned several buildings. Important monuments include the Gaocheng Astronomical Observatory, the Shaolin Monastery (pictured), and the Songyue Pagoda.
China Danxia	A series of stone pillars, partially covered with vegetation	Hunan, Guangdong, Fujian, Jiangxi, Zhejiang, Guizhou	2010	1335; vii, viii (natural)	China Danxia is a type of karst landform characterized by red conglomerate and sandstone cliffs with a range of weathered and eroded landscapes, including natural pillars, towers, ravines, valleys, and waterfalls, resulting in great natural beauty. This site comprises nine components in six clusters, representing the most typical formations of different ages and with different levels of weathering. Mount Danxia is pictured.
West Lake Cultural Landscape of Hangzhou	Night view of a lake with a pavilion	Zhejiang	2011	1334; ii, iii, vi (cultural)	The cultural landscape around the lake in Hangzhou has influenced artists, poets, and philosophers since the Tang dynasty. There are numerous temples, pagodas, pavilions, causeways, and gardens, which were designed in line with the Buddhist ideals of peacefulness. The designs were influential in Japan and Korea as well.
Chengjiang Fossil Site	Maotianshan	Yunnan	2012	1388; viii (natural)	The fossil site preserves the remains of organisms dating to the early Cambrian, 530 million years ago. This was the period of the rapid diversification of lifeforms. Almost all major groups of animals can trace their origins to this short geological interval. At least 16 phyla have been identified, including the oldest known fossil chordates. The Chengjiang biota illustrates complex food webs in a marine community, with sophisticated predators on top. A fossil of Maotianshania is pictured.
Site of Xanadu	People walking on wooden paths around ruins of buildings in a grassy landscape	Inner Mongolia	2012	1389; ii, iii, iv, vi (cultural)	Xanadu was the first capital of Kublai Khan and then the summer capital of the Yuan dynasty in the 13th and 14th centuries. Abandoned in 1430 and today preserved as an archaeological site, it demonstrates the integration of Mongol and Han Chinese cultures, combining a Han city plan following the feng shui principles with gardens and landscapes that were essential to the nomadic Mongolian lifestyle. Xanadu was important in the spread of Tibetan Buddhism in north-east Asia.
Xinjiang Tianshan	Tall snow-covered mountains with a small lake in front	Xinjiang	2013	1414; vii, ix (natural)	The Tian Shan mountain range is located between two desert regions, Dzungaria in the north and the Tarim Basin in the south. Contrasting the arid surroundings, the mountains have glaciers, forests, meadows, lakes, and rivers. The ecosystems have been preserved since the Pliocene epoch and demonstrate the ongoing biological and ecological evolutionary processes in the temperate zone. The mountains (Jengish Chokusu, the highest mountain of the range, pictured) reach above 7,000 m (23,000 ft) and exhibit a succession of vegetation zones. The area is home to several relict and endangered species.
Cultural Landscape of Honghe Hani Rice Terraces	Rice terraces on a mountain slope	Yunnan	2013	1111; iii, v (cultural)	On the mountain slopes along the Hong River, over the course of 1300 years, the Hani people have created a cultural landscape with terraces used to grow red rice, their main staple crop. They use a complex integrated system of farming and water management that relies on ducks, buffaloes, cattle, and fish to provide fertilizers to the plants. The Hani worship the nature, and their land management system is a manifestation of their "Man-God Unity social system".
Silk Roads: the Routes Network of Chang'an-Tianshan Corridor*	A large pagoda in sandy colour	Henan, Shaanxi, Gansu, Xinjiang	2014	1442; ii, iii, v, vi (cultural)	The Silk Road is an ancient network of trade routes that started forming in the 2nd century BCE and remained active until the 16th century. The roads connected societies of China, India, Central Asia, Western Asia, and the Near East. In addition to exchange of goods, they also contributed to the spread of technologies, ideologies, and religions, including Buddhism, Nestorian Christianity, Manichaeism, Zoroastrianism, and early Islam. Several towns and supporting infrastructure have been constructed along the routes. This World Heritage Site covers the corridors from Chang'an/Luoyang, the Han and Tang capitals of China, to the Zhetysu region of Central Asia, and is shared with Kazakhstan and Kyrgyzstan. Of 33 sites on the roads listed, 19 are in China. The Giant Wild Goose Pagoda in Xi'an is pictured.
The Grand Canal	Stone bridge over a river canal	Beijing, Tianjin, Hebei, Shandong, Jiangsu, Zhejiang, Anhui, Henan	2014	1443; i, iii, iv, vi (cultural)	The Grand Canal is a vast network of artificial canals running from Beijing to Zhejiang and connecting China's five major river basins. The canal was constructed in stages, with the first ones dating to the 5th century BCE, and it got fully connected in the 7th century under the Sui dynasty. It formed the backbone of the imperial monopoly for the transport of grain and strategic raw materials, and allowed distribution of food across the country, as well as taxation and movement of the troops. Being the oldest and longest canal in the world, it demonstrates technological innovations with dams, dykes, and weirs, combined with the original use of natural materials. A total of 31 sites along the canal are listed. The Gongchen Bridge in Hangzhou is pictured.
Tusi Sites	A stone fortress on the slopes of a hill	Hunan, Hubei, Guizhou	2015	1474; ii, iii (cultural)	The tusi were hereditary rulers of the tribal areas in southwestern China, appointed by the central government between the 13th and 20th centuries. This way of ruling helped unifying the administration on the national level, while nevertheless allowing ethnic minorities to retain their customs and way of life. Three representative sites are listed: Laosicheng, Tangya Tusi Fortress, and Hailongtun (pictured).
Zuojiang Huashan Rock Art Cultural Landscape	Rock paintings in red colour depicting human figures in ritual activities	Guangxi	2016	1508; iii, vi (cultural)	This site comprises three clusters of rock art dating from 5th to the 2nd century BCE. They were interpreted to be created by the Luoyue people of the bronze drum culture, once widespread in the region. Rock paintings depict different aspects of ritual and social life.
Hubei Shennongjia	Mountain landscape with forests and some houses	Hubei	2016	1509bis; ix, x (natural)	The area protects the largest primary forests remaining in central China and is exceptionally rich in biodiversity. Different types of forest, including evergreen broad-leaved forest, mixed evergreen, and deciduous broad-leaved forest, are home to several threatened animal species, including the Chinese giant salamander, clouded leopard, and golden snub-nosed monkey. A minor boundary modification of the site took place in 2021.
Qinghai Hoh Xil	High altitude plateau with sparse vegetation and mountains in the background	Qinghai	2017	1540; vii, x (natural)	Hoh Xil is a part of the Tibetan Plateau, the largest and highest plateau in the world. At an elevation of 4,500 m (14,800 ft), the area experiences year-round low temperatures. Mountain and steppe ecosystems are home to several endemic animal and plant species. There are also hot springs, lakes, and glaciers. The plateau is an important migratory and calving area for the Tibetan antelope. Other large animals include the wild yak, kiang, and goa.
Kulangsu: a Historic International Settlement	A look from above at houses in Chinese and western styles	Fujian	2017	1541; ii, vi (cultural)	Kulangsu, an island off the commercial port of Xiamen, became the site of an international settlement, established in 1903. It played an important role in the cultural exchange between China and the West. This is reflected in the fusion of traditional Fujian architecture with the styles brought by the westerners and the returning Overseas Chinese. A particular style, called Amoy Deco, developed as a fusion of Art Deco and Modern architecture.
Fanjingshan	Mountain range in clouds	Guizhou	2018	1559; x (natural)	Fanjingshan, part of the Wuling Mountains, is a metamorphic rock formation in an otherwise karst area. There are four vegetation zones on the mountain slopes, from evergreen broadleaf forest at lower elevations to mixed deciduous broadleaf and conifer and scrub forest above 2,200 m (7,200 ft). Located in the monsoon zone, the mountains are a source of water for the surroundings. The area is rich in plant species, especially in bryophytes and gymnosperms. Fanjingshan is the only habitat of the Fanjingshan fir and the gray snub-nosed monkey.
Archaeological ruins of Liangzhu City	Archaeological site with remains of city walls under a modern protective roof	Zhejiang	2019	1592; iii, iv (cultural)	The archaeological site, located in the Yangtze Delta, comprises four areas with the remains of the Liangzhu culture, a late Neolithic culture based on rice agriculture dating to c. 3300-2300 BCE. It demonstrates the transition of small-scale societies to larger political entities with social stratification and complex rituals and crafts.
Migratory Bird Sanctuaries along the Coast of Yellow Sea-Bohai Gulf of China	A water bird with a long black beak	Hebei, Jiangsu, Liaoning, Shandong, Shanghai	2019	1606bis; x (natural)	The wetlands along the Yellow Sea and Bohai Sea serve as crucial stopover, wintering, or breeding sites for birds migrating from the Arctic to South-East Asia and Australasia. Millions of birds migrate along this route annually, with more than 400 species recorded, including the endangered spoon-billed sandpiper (a specimen pictured) and Nordmann's greenshank. The serial site comprises 12 components with wetlands, mudflats, beaches, and marshes that were inscribed in two phases, in 2019 and 2024.
Quanzhou: Emporium of the World in Song-Yuan China	A view from above at a city, including a pond with a pavilion	Fujian	2021	1561rev; iv (cultural)	Quanzhou was China's major port for foreign traders, who knew it as Zaiton, during the 11th through 14th centuries, under the Song and Yuan dynasties. The site comprises religious and administrative buildings, workshops for ceramics and iron objects, transport infrastructure such as bridges and docks, and pagodas that directed the voyagers. The 11th century Qingjing Mosque is one of the oldest Islamic buildings in China.
Cultural Landscape of Old Tea Forests of the Jingmai Mountain in Pu'er	Old tea forests	Yunnan	2023	1665; iii, v (cultural)	Jingmai Mountain, developed since the 10th century by the Bulang and Dai people, is the primary production area of the Pu'er tea. Located in a favourable monsoon and mountain microclimate, there are old tea grows and plantations, together with traditional villages. Traditions and ceremonies of the villagers originate from the Tea Ancestor belief.
Badain Jaran Desert - Towers of Sand and Lakes	Desert landscape with dunes and a small lake	Inner Mongolia	2024	1638; vii, viii (natural)	China's third largest desert features different types of dunes, including stable linear mega-dunes reaching up to 460 m (1,510 ft). There are numerous inter-dunal lakes, mostly saline and home to worms, molluscs, crustaceans, and fish. The desert is also the world's largest expanse of singing sands, referring to the sound produced by the sand moved by the wind.
Beijing Central Axis: A Building Ensemble Exhibiting the Ideal Order of the Chinese Capital	A view at the city from above, including several historic buildings	Beijing	2024	1714, iii, vi (cultural)	The Central Axis is an ensemble of palaces, gardens, religious sites, and public buildings, running in the north–south direction in central Beijing. It was established under the Yuan dynasty in the 13th century, with further buildings added under the Ming and Qing dynasties. The layout follows the Confucian ideas as expressed in the ancient text Kaogongji (Book of Diverse Crafts), depicting an ideal capital.
Xixia Imperial Tombs	Ruins of a mausoleum in brick and stone in a desert area	Ningxia	2025	1736; ii, iii (cultural)	The Western Xia or the Tangut civilization existed from 1038 to 1227, when it was conquered by the Mongol Empire. The site comprises nine imperial mausolea, 254 smaller tombs, and an archaeological site with kiln sites. The mausolea and the unearthed funerary objects in them provide an insight into the culture of the Tangut society.
Jingdezhen Handicraft Porcelain Industry Sites	Ruins of a kiln	Jiangxi	2026	1765; ii, iii, iv, vi (cultural)	Jingdezhen has been a pottery production centre since the 10th century and gained prominence during the Ming and Qing dynasties for its high-quality porcelain, resulting in its production for the emperor and his court. The local techniques have influenced the development of Chinese porcelain, which became a symbol of the country abroad following its mass export during the Age of Discovery. The site covers both imperial and civilian kilns (Hutian Kiln pictured), as well as mining sites and other areas related to the industry process.

== Tentative list ==
In addition to sites inscribed on the World Heritage List, member states can maintain a list of tentative sites that they may consider for nomination. Nominations for the World Heritage List are only accepted if the site was previously listed on the tentative list. China has 60 sites on its tentative list.

Tentative sites
Site	Image	Location (prov. level)	Year listed	UNESCO criteria	Description
Dongzhai Port Nature Reserve	Landscape with mangroves	Hainan	1996	(natural)	The nature reserve protects more than 50 km (31 mi) of coast with mangrove forests, some of which were planted after the 1980s in a reforestation initiative. The forests are important habitat for birds, fish, amphibians, molluscs, and crustaceans.
The Alligator Sinensis Nature Reserve	A Chinese alligator on the ground	Anhui	1996	(natural)	The nature reserve protects the endangered Chinese alligator (a specimen pictured). In addition to protected areas with lakes and rivers where the alligators live, there is also a research centre running a successful breeding program. At the time of nomination, there were around a thousand alligators living in the nature reserve.
Poyang Nature Reserve		Jiangxi	1996	(natural)	Poyang Lake is China's largest freshwater lake. It substantially changes in size between the dry and wet seasons. It is rich in fish and mollusc species and is an important habitat or migration stop for birds. Around 150 bird species have been registered at the lake, including the Siberian crane, white-naped crane, hooded crane, and black stork.
The Lijiang River Scenic Zone at Guilin	Karst cones and a river in front	Guangxi	1996	(natural)	This nomination centred on the karst landforms in the Guilin area. In 2014, the area was listed as a component in an extension of the South China Karst site.
Yalong, Tibet	A palace in white stone with a yellow top overlooking a barren valley	Tibet	2001	(mixed)	The Yarlung Valley is the cradle of the Tibetan culture. The remains of a Neolithic village indicate people settled here ten millennia ago. The Yungbulakang Palace (pictured) was constructed in the 2nd century BCE as Tibet's first royal palace. There are palaces, temples, and shrines from different periods. From the natural point of view, the Yarlung Tsangpo river has carved a deep canyon through the Himalayas, exposing different geological layers.
Yangtze Gorges Scenic Spot	A river gorge with steep walls	Hubei, Chongqing	2001	(mixed)	The Three Gorges on the Yangtze River have been renowned for their scenic beauty for centuries and has inspired numerous poets, writers, and painters. Archeological excavations uncovered Neolithic artifacts, including pottery, and there are burial sites from the Han dynasty. From the natural point of view, the gorges expose different geologic strata, there are numerous karst landforms, and the area is home to threatened species such as the Yangtze finless porpoise, Chinese pangolin, Chinese giant salamander, and golden snub-nosed monkey.
Jinfoshan Scenic Spot	Karst landscape with mountains with cliffs and a forest	Chongqing	2001	vii, viii, ix (natural)	Mount Jinfo has large cliffs and numerous karst cave systems. As it was not covered by glaciers during the Quaternary glaciation, the area served as a refugium for ancient plant species, including the threatened Cathaya and dawn redwood. In 2014, the area was listed as a component in an extension of the South China Karst site.
Heaven Pit and Ground Seam Scenic Spot	A large sinkhole in a mountain area	Chongqing	2001	vii, viii, ix (natural)	The Heaven Pit (pictured) is a large sinkhole. It is connected to an underground karst river system. The area is home to threatened plant species, such as the dawn redwood. The caves are home to a diverse troglofauna, including species of fish, crickets, and amphibians.
Hua Shan Scenic Area	Mountain peaks partially covered by trees and some tourists	Shaanxi	2001	(mixed)	Mount Hua is one of the Five Great Mountains of Taoism, with worship ongoing since the times of the Han dynasty. There are numerous temples, tablets, and rock inscriptions from different periods. The mountain itself is a large granite formation with many scenic spots. There are around 1,200 species of plants on the mountain, including some endemic or endangered, and there are several ancient trees.
Yandang Mountain	Mountain scenery with stone pillar formations	Zhejiang	2001	(mixed)	Yandang Mountains formed during volcanic eruptions in the Cretaceous. The resulting caldera exposes different geologic structures. The area is rich in plant species, including some endemic. The natural beauty of the mountains, with rock formations, cliffs, rivers, ponds, and waterfalls, have inspired poets and artists at least since the Tang dynasty. There are temples and stone inscriptions left by travelers.
Nanxi River	River with rock formations	Zhejiang	2001	(mixed)	The river crosses a landscape with rocks such as tuff, rhyolite, and granite. The monsoon climate is influenced by the maritime climate due to the proximity to the sea. The area is home to the Chinese sweet gum and ginkgo trees.
Maijishan Scenic Spots	Wooden stairs up a cliff side leading to grottoes in the wall	Gansu	2001	(mixed)	Buddhist grottoes were first constructed in the cliffs of Maijishan during the time of the Later Qin and work continued until the Qing dynasty. The grottoes contain murals and clay sculptures. The area is on the meeting point of the floristic regions of North and South China and is thus rich in plant species. In 2014, the grottoes were listed as a component of the World Heritage Site Silk Roads: the Routes Network of Chang'an-Tianshan Corridor.
Wudalianchi Scenic Spots	Volcanic landscape with lava flows and a lake in the background	Heilongjiang	2001	viii, ix (natural)	Wudalianchi was the site of volcanic eruptions in 1719–1721. There are numerous volcanic landforms, including volcanogenic lakes, volcanic cones, lava flows, lava tubes, volcanic bombs, and mineral springs.
Haitan Scenic Spots	Panorama of a town at a sandy beach, surrounded by green vegetation	Fujian	2001	(mixed)	The landscape of the Pingtan Island was shaped by the combination of volcanic activity and erosion, resulting in different types of rock formations. There are sandy beaches, lush green forests, and a freshwater lake.
Dali Cangshan Mountain and Erhai Lake Scenic Spot	Steep cliffs overlooking hills covered in forest	Yunnan	2001	(mixed)	The area has numerous scenic spots and is rich in plant species. People settled here already during the Neolithic and Dali City was the capital of the kingdoms of the Bai people, including the kingdom of Nanzhao and Dali Kingdom. Present communities still maintain their distinct traditions.
Sites for Liquor Making in China	Archaeological site protected by a rood	Hebei, Jiangxi, Sichuan	2008	iii, iv, vi (cultural)	This nomination comprises five archaeological sites related to liquor production in China. The oldest excavated site is the Lidu Workshop, which has 11 layers spanning from the Song dynasty period to modern times. Findings at these sites demonstrate different stages of liquor production, with preparation of raw materials, fermentation, distillation, and brewing. The site at Shuijingjie is pictured.
Ancient Residences in Shanxi and Shaanxi Provinces (Dingcun and Dangjiacun villages)	Look from above at a traditional village, with a pagoda in the background	Shanxi, Shaanxi	2008	Cultural: ii, iii, iv	Dingcun and Dangjiacun (pictured) are traditional villages dating to the Ming and Qing dynasties. Dingcun has 40 preserved private residential houses which feature wood carving decorations. People of Dangjiacun got rich from trade. More than a hundred private residences and public buildings have been preserved.
City Walls of the Ming and Qing Dynasties	City walls with two prominent towers, partially obscured by trees	Shaanxi, Hubei, Jiangsu, Liaoning	2008	iii, iv (cultural)	This nomination comprises defensive city walls in four cities: the fortifications of Xi'an (pictured), the City Wall of Nanjing, and the city walls of Jingzhou and Xingcheng. The brick and stone walls were constructed during the Ming and Qing dynasties. Apart from occasional reconstructions, they are well preserved and demonstrate the evolution of fortification architecture in China.
Slender West Lake and Historic Urban Area in Yangzhou	Boat on a lake with pavilions and a bridges on the shore	Jiangsu	2008	iii, iv, v (cultural)	Yangzhou was a rich city due to its role in salt production and trade. There are well-preserved historic houses, temples, palaces, and gardens. The Slender West Lake was formed during the Qing dynasty by joining the moats around the city from previous periods. It is an example of a traditional Chinese public tourist destination.
Ancient Water Towns South of the Yangtze River	Traditional houses along a canal with several boats	Zhejiang, Jiangsu	2008	ii, iv, v (cultural)	These four towns, Zhouzhuang (pictured), Luzhi, Wuzhen, and Xitang, are representative of the traditional towns that developed along the watercourses in the 11th century and thrived from the 13th century on. Traditional houses and bridges have been preserved. People practiced handcrafts, trade, fishing, and agriculture in the fertile lands around the towns.
Chinese Section of the Silk Road: Land routes in Henan, Shaanxi, Gansu, Qinghai, Ningxia, and Xinjiang; Sea Routes in Ningbo, and Quanzhou City, - from Western-Han Dynasty to Qing Dynasty	Ruins of a watchtower in a desert setting	Shaanxi, Gansu, Xinjiang, Zhejiang, Fujian	2008	i, ii, iii, iv, v, vi (cultural)	This nomination comprised different land sections of the Silk Road in China. In 2014, several of the components were listed under the Silk Roads: the Routes Network of Chang'an-Tianshan Corridor. A Han dynasty watchtower near Dunhuang is pictured.
Fenghuang Ancient City	Traditional houses at a river and people crossing on two bridges made of stones	Hunan	2008	i, ii, iii, iv (cultural)	Fenghuang is located in a river and mountain setting. Traditional architecture dates from the Ming and Qing dynasties, expressing a strong regional character. The city is home to a sizeable Miao community.
Sites of the Southern Yue State	Site of the Southern Yue palace	Guangdong	2008	ii, iii (cultural)	Southern Yue was a vassal state of the Han dynasty, with the capital in today's Guangzhou. It existed from 203 to 111 BCE. This nomination comprises the tomb of the king Zhao Mo, the remains of a palace (pictured), and the remains of a wooden water gate. Archaeological finds on these sites demonstrate the interaction between the regional and Han cultures.
Baiheliang Ancient Hydrological Inscription	Underwater inscriptions	Chongqing	2008	iii, iv (cultural)	Baiheliang is a ridge that was used to monitor the water levels of the Yangtze, starting in 763 under the Tang dynasty. People carved stone fish sculptures to record the lowest water level of the season, and also carved names and poems. The site was submerged following the construction of the Three Gorges Dam.
Miao Nationality Villages in Southeast Guizhou Province: The villages of Miao Nationality at the Foot of Leigong Mountain in Miao Ling Mountains	A town with traditional houses on the slopes of both sides of a small stream	Guizhou	2008	i, iv, v, vi (cultural)	This nomination comprises four areas with 21 traditional towns and villages of the Miao people. They demonstrate traditional architecture, as well as rich distinct cultural practices. Xijiang in Leishan County is pictured.
Karez Wells	A look in an underground tunnel for water with a wooden walking path	Xinjiang	2008	i, iv, v (culture)	Karez, or qanat, is a traditional type of a water supply network comprising open and underground channels for water, reservoirs, and wells. There are more than 1,400 karez wells in the Turpan area, where they supply water for irrigation. The oases also supported traveling merchants crossing the desert region.
Expansion Project of Imperial Tombs of the Ming and Qing Dynasties: King Lujian's Tombs	A paved path lined with stone sculptures of animals, as a component of a royal tomb	Henan	2008	ii, iii, iv, vi (cultural)	This is a proposed extension to the site Imperial Tombs of the Ming and Qing Dynasties. The tomb of King Lujian, a feudal prince under his brother, the Wanli Emperor of the Ming dynasty, was completed in 1615. It is located in Xinxiang and is larger than comparable royal tombs of the period. It was renovated in the late 20th century after being used for other purposes, and is now protected as a museum.
The Four Sacred Mountains as an extension of Mt. Taishan	A temple on the slopes of a mountain	Shanxi, Shaanxi, Henan, Hunan	2008	i, ii, iii, iv, vi, vii, viii (mixed)	Mount Tai has been listed as a World Heritage Site since 1987, as one of the five Sacred Mountains of China. This nomination proposes an expansion with the other four mountains, Mount Hua, Southern Mount Heng, Northern Mount Heng, and Mount Song (pictured). These mountains have been places of worship for at least three millennia and have numerous temples, inscriptions, and traditions associated with them. They also exhibit various types of flora and fauna as they are located in different climate zones.
Taklimakan Desert–Populus euphratica Forests	Desert dunes	Xinjiang	2010	viii, ix, x (natural)	Taklamakan Desert is a warm temperate desert with sand dunes. It is an endorheic basin and the Tarim River empties in the Lop Nur lake. Populus euphratica forests grow along the river. Adjusted to sparse water resources by having deep roots, these forests support local food webs, serve as migration channels for migratory birds, and protect the landscape against desertification.
China Altay	Mountain lake surrounded by coniferous forest	Xinjiang	2010	vii, viii, ix (natural)	This nomination comprises two protected areas in the Chinese part of the Altai Mountains, the Kanas National Nature Reserve (pictured) and the Two Rivers' Headwaters Nature Reserve. The mountains have over 200 glaciers and numerous glacial landforms, such as cirques, nunataks, moraines, and boulders. The receding of the glaciers after the Quaternary glaciation is well documented. The area is the southernmost point of the distribution of Siberian flora and fauna.
Karakorum–Pamir	Mountain valley with some yurts	Xinjiang	2010	viii, x (natural)	The two mountain ranges were created in an ongoing process of the Indian Plate thrusting into the Eurasian Plate and demonstrate a wide variety of geological processes related to mountain formation. There are thousands of glaciers with related glacial landforms. The area is home to rare and endangered animals, such as the kiang, argali, and snow leopard. This nomination comprises two nature reserves, Tashkurghan National Nature Reserve (pictured) and Pamir Wetlands National Nature Reserve.
Wooden Structures of Liao Dynasty – Wooden Pagoda of Yingxian County, Main Hall of Fengguo Monastery of Yixian County	A multi-storey wooden pagoda with houses in the background	Shanxi, Liaoning	2013	i, iii, iv (cultural)	This nomination comprises two buildings from the Liao dynasty from the 11th century. The Wooden Pagoda (pictured) is the oldest and tallest surviving wooden multi-storey building in the world and is an outstanding architectural and engineering achievement. The Main Hall of the Fengguo Monastery is the biggest wooden structure with one tier of eaves. It has beautiful Buddhist sculptures and painted walls.
Sites of Hongshan Culture: The Niuheliang Archaeological Site, the Hongshanhou Archaeological Site, and Weijiawopu Archaeological Site	Hongshan Sites	Liaoning, Inner Mongolia	2013	i, iii, iv (cultural)	This nomination comprises three archaeological sites of the Hongshan culture, a Neolithic culture dating circa 5-6 millennia ago. Compared to the earlier cultures of the area, the Hongshan society was more populous, the technological level increased, and a new social class, related to sacrificial activities, appeared. They practiced farming, fishing, and hunter-gathering. Remains include altars, stone mounds, burial sites, tools, and finely carved jade objects.
Ancient Porcelain Kiln Site in China	A traditional kiln surrounded by trees	Zhejiang	2013	ii, iii, iv (cultural)	This nomination comprises traditional kiln sites of China from the 1st to the 17th century, including the Shanglin Lake Yue Kilns (pictured) and Longquan as the most important ones. These sites have the longest history of porcelain making, especially celadon, and the production was on the largest scale. Chinese ceramics were highly influential in the development of porcelain industries worldwide.
SanFangQiXiang	A look at a group of traditional houses from above	Fujian	2013	iii, iv (cultural)	Sanfang Qixiang, a historic quarter in the city of Fuzhou, is an example of a residential ward for Chinese literati, city officials, and wealthy gentry. The urban layout has remained the same since at least the times of the Tang dynasty over a thousand years ago while the current buildings date to the Ming and Qing dynasties.
Dong Villages	A wooden roofed bridge over a river	Hunan, Guangxi	2013	iii, iv, v (cultural)	The Dong people are an ethnic minority that live in southwest China. This nomination comprises 22 representative villages. Typical features are multi-storied wooden stilt houses, covered bridges, and unique drum towers. The Chengyang Bridge in Sanjiang Dong Autonomous County is pictured.
Lingqu Canal	River canal with trees on the banks	Guangxi	2013	i, iv, vi (cultural)	The 36.4 km (22.6 mi) long canal to connect the river basins of the Yangtze and the Pearl River Delta was commissioned by the first Chinese emperor, Qin Shi Huang, and was completed in 214 BCE. It served as a key transport route for the next two millennia, until the completion of a modern railway system. The canal had an important role in controlling of newly conquered territories by the Qin dynasty and is an important example of hydraulic engineering of the period.
Diaolou Buildings and Villages for Tibetan and Qiang Ethnic Groups	Village with tall watchtowers on a mountain slope with trees	Sichuan	2013	i, ii, iii, iv, v (cultural)	The villages of the Tibetan and Qiang people feature high watchtowers, the diaolou. These stone or sometimes adobe constructions are up to 60 m (200 ft) tall. The oldest date to the time of the Tang dynasty. The towers also functioned as residences and as a display of wealth. The villages are often surrounded by sacred forests or mountains. A village in Danba County is pictured.
Archaeological Sites of the Ancient Shu State: Site at Jinsha and Joint Tombs of Boat-shaped Coffins in Chengdu City, Sichuan Province; Site of Sanxingdui in Guanghan City, Sichuan Province 29C.BC-5C.BC	Archaeological site under a protective roof	Sichuan	2013	i, ii, iii, v (cultural)	Shu was a Bronze Age kingdom on the Chengdu Plain. It had a distinct and highly developed culture. In 316 BCE, it was conquered by the Qin state. This nomination comprises three archaeological sites related to the Shu culture: Jinsha (pictured), the joint tombs of boat-shaped coffins, and Sanxingdui.
Xinjiang Yardang	Three large rock formations peaking out of desert landscape	Xinjiang	2015	vii, viii (natural)	A yardang is a landform that is created when a bedrock protuberance is exposed to weathering, runoff, and wind erosion. This results in typically elongated ridges which sometimes have curious shapes. This nomination comprises yardangs in the Qaidam Basin. They demonstrate different stages of yardang evolution, from early stages to eventual collapse.
Dunhuang Yardangs	Yardang rock formations in a desert, a road crossing the area	Gansu	2015	vii, viii (natural)	Dunhuang is another site with a prominent collection of yardangs, desert rock formations shaped by erosion. Groups of yardangs resemble ships sailing across a desert sea. The area is also an important habitat for the wild Bactrian camel.
Tianzhushan	A granite mountain peak with interesting shapes	Anhui	2015	ii, iii, v, vi, vii, viii (mixed)	Mount Tianzhu is a granite mountain with numerous rock formations renowned for their natural beauty. The area is important in the scientific studies of metamorphic rocks and there are fossil sites known for Paleocene mammals. There are also archaeological sites of the Neolithic Xuejiagang culture with remains of pottery and tools. The Cliffside stone has rock inscriptions spanning 1,200 years, with the first dating to the Tang dynasty.
Jinggangshan–North Wuyishan (Extension of Mount Wuyi)		Jiangxi, Hunan	2015	iii, vi, vii, x (mixed)	This is a proposed extension to the site Mount Wuyi, listed in 1999. It comprises an area in the Jinggang Mountains (pictured) and North Wuyishan, which are important in view of natural values, as habitats for numerous relict animal and plant species. There are also several historic sites related to the Neo-Confucianist schools and archaeological sites related to cultures that lived here in the 1st century BCE.
ShuDao	Tower on a mountain pass with trees around	Sichuan	2015	ii, iii, iv, vi, vii, x (mixed)	ShuDao is an ancient system of roads connecting the civilizations of the Yangtze and the Yellow River via the mountains of the northern Sichuan. It was first established in the 4th century BCE and was important in major historical events, including unification wars under the Qin dynasty and population migrations. There are numerous historic towns, temples, and sacred Chinese cypress trees. From the natural perspective, the area features numerous karst and danxia landforms and is home to endangered species such as the giant panda, red panda, and takin. Jianmen Pass is pictured.
Tulin–Guge Scenic and Historic Interest Areas	Earthen buildings on the slope of a hill with tulin landforms	Tibet	2015	ii, iii, v, vi, vii, viii (mixed)	Guge was a kingdom that existed between the 10th and 17th centuries in Tibet. They were influential in the spread of Buddhism and were skilled in gold, silver, and pottery manufacture. They traded with several Eurasian countries. The area is notable for its tulin landforms, which are clay formations that take the shape of pillars. There are also mammal fossil sites. Tsaparang, the Guge capital, is pictured.
Guancen Mountain – Luya Mountain	Guancen Mountain	Shanxi	2017	vii, ix (natural)	The area, an extension of the Lüliang Mountains, is rich in biodiversity. There is a large pristine Prince Rupprecht's larch forest with Picea meyeri spruces. In the mountains, there are meadows and subalpine bushes with tundra at higher elevations. Animals that live in the area include the brown eared pheasant, grey-sided thrush, and Amur leopard.
Hulun Buir Landscape & Birthplace of Ancient Minority	Landscape with lake and clouds	Inner Mongolia	2017	iii, vii, ix, x (mixed)	This nomination comprises six reserves (Hulun Lake pictured) with forests, grasslands, and wetlands. The wetlands are important stops for migratory birds, including five species of cranes. Other animals that live in the area include the sable, brown bear, and Eurasian lynx. There are archaeological sites, related to the Donghu people. They include tombs, ancient cities, and defensive structures.
Qinghai Lake	Lake with some boats and a mountain in the background	Qinghai	2017	vii, ix, x (natural)	Qinghai Lake is a large endorheic salt lake that supports a surrounding wetland ecosystem, important for nesting and migratory water birds. The area around the lake is the only habitat of the endangered Przewalski's gazelle. The only fish in the lake is the Przewalskii's naked carp which migrates to inflow streams to spawn.
Scenic and historic area of Sacred Mountains and Lakes	Mount Kailash, partially covered by snow	Tibet	2017	iii, v, vi, vii, viii, x (mixed)	The mountain landscape, with prominent features including Mount Kailash (pictured), Naimona'nyi, Lake Manasarovar, and Lhanag-tso, is sacred in Hinduism, Buddhism, Jainism, and Bon religions. The area was the cradle of the Zhangzhung civilization. Religious ceremonies date back at least to 1000 BCE. Circumambulation of Mount Kailash on foot is still an important religious ceremony. From the natural point of view, the area is important in view of documenting effects of plate tectonics that created the Himalayas, numerous glaciers, Cenozoic fossil sites, and biodiversity.
Taihang Mountain	Mountain scenery	Hebei, Shanxi, Henan	2017	iii, vii, viii, x (mixed)	Taihang Mountains, part of the Loess Plateau, have different land formations, including gorges, caves, and waterfalls. There are geological layers spanning from the Archean eon to Cenozoic, with important fossil finds. Furthermore, there are archaeological sites related to early humans that were present in the area up to 2 million years ago. Animals that live in the area include the black stork and golden eagle.
Vertical Vegetation Landscape and Volcanic Landscape in Changbai Mountain	Caldera lake at a high elevation	Jillin	2017	vii, viii, ix, x (natural)	The mountain is a dormant volcano with a crater lake, Heaven Lake (pictured). Vegetation zones along the mountain slopes support diverse plant communities characteristic of temperate forests at lower elevations to those similar to the Arctic on the top. The mountains feature volcanic, glacial, and karst landforms.
Guizhou Triassic Fossil Sites	Museum display of a fossil of a marine reptile	Guizhou	2019	viii (natural)	Four fossil sites comprised in this nomination provide an insight into the evolution of marine life during the Triassic period, following the Permian–Triassic extinction event. Terrestrial reptiles transitioned to life in the oceans, giving rise to groups such as ichthyosaurs and earliest turtles. A museum display of a Xinpusaurus fossil is pictured.
Huangguoshu Scenic Area	A large waterfall surrounded by lush vegetation	Guizhou	2019	v, vii, viii (mixed)	The karst landscape was shaped through centuries by the Bouyei and Miao people, in interaction with the Han Chinese. There are ancient villages, remains of military camps, and bridges. Natural features include karst formations and the large Huangguoshu Waterfall (pictured).
Hainan Tropical Rainforest and the Traditional Settlement of Li Ethnic Group	Mountain covered in forest	Hainan	2022	iii, v, x (mixed)	The Hainan Island is rich in plant species and home to the endangered and endemic Hainan black-crested gibbon, as well as several endemic bird species. The Hlai people, or Li, that live on the island have developed a culture that is constantly adapting to life in a tropical setting. However, traditional villages are today endangered because of rapid development and globalization.
Fujian Minjiang River Estuary: The ecotone between marine and terrestrial biogeographical regions	River with a fish farm	Fujian	2022	x (natural)	The area comprises different habitats such as mangroves, salt marshes, sea, and a river estuary. There are over 100 species of fish and the area is important for migratory birds.
Hezheng Mammalian Fossil Sites of Gansu	Fossil tooth of an ancient elephant relative	Gansu	2024	viii (natural)	This nomination comprises five fossil sites in Hezheng County. They are rich with mammal, bird, and reptile fossils from the period from 30 to 2 million years ago. Genera identified in these sites include Hipparion, Coelodonta, and Platybelodon (a molar pictured), related to modern-day horses, rhinoceroses, and elephants, respectively.
Guizhou Shuanghe Cave		Guizhou	2025	vii, viii (natural)	This cave is the longest in Asia and the third longest in the world. A plethora of natural processes has formed the complex and at times unpredictable shape of Shaunghe Cave, reflecting the different stages of Earth's history. Almost all types of carbonate and sulfate deposits can be found here. Furthermore, the cave is the site of numerous well-preserved fossils.
Zhangye Colorful Hills	Rock hills with red and white stripes	Gansu	2025	vii, viii (natural)	These hills exhibit a striped pattern as the result of folding of different rock layers that formed due to complex tectonic processes. As the consequence of their low resistance to weathering, the hills are rounded and relatively low. In addition to their aesthetic beauty, Zhangye Hills also demonstrate the geologic conditions and dynamics of the Mesozoic and Cenozoic eras.
Jehol Biota Fossil Sites in Chaoyang	Fossil of a feathered dinosaur	Liaoning	2026	viii (natural)	

== See also ==
- National priority protected site
- Principles for the Conservation of Heritage Sites in China
