= List of castles in China =

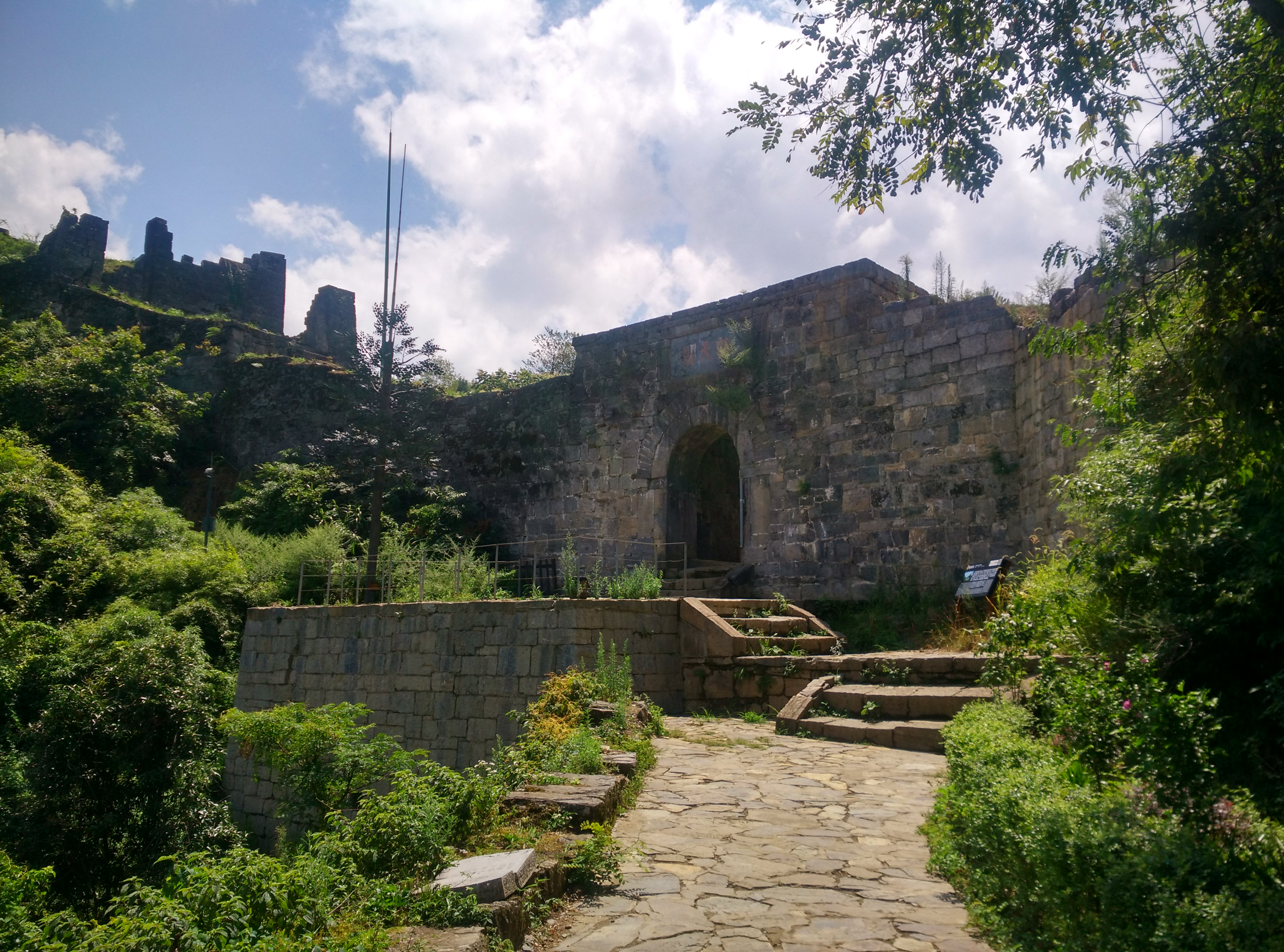
Hailongtun, a rare example of a true castle in China

This is a list of castles in China. As feudalism in China had been largely superseded by centralised nation states since the Qin dynasty from 221 BC, most Chinese castles were not intended as residences of the nobility, but are more properly described as either fortresses or fortified vernacular and religious structures. These can include fortified communal residences, private fortified residences of large landowning families, military purposed fortresses, and fortified religious architecture, especially in Tibetan regions (Dzongs). As such, the list can be broadly classified into these few categories.

== True feudal castle ==
Surviving true feudal castles are built by Tusi, the hereditary leaders of self-governing ethnic minorities groups in Southwestern China during the Ming dynasty. Most Tusi rules are abolished by mid Qing dynasty. Three Tusi Sites were recognized by the UNESCO as World Heritage Sites in 2015.

- Hailongtun Castle (海龙屯)
- Laosicheng (老司城)

== Fortified communal residences or villages ==
In southern China, especially Fujian and Guangdong province, a type of fortified communal residence built by the Hakka people known as Hakka walled village (围龙屋/围楼) can be found. These are large multi-family communal living structure that were built by the immigrant Hakkas for protection in the event of clan wars with other Chinese clan groups (for example, see Punti–Hakka Clan Wars).

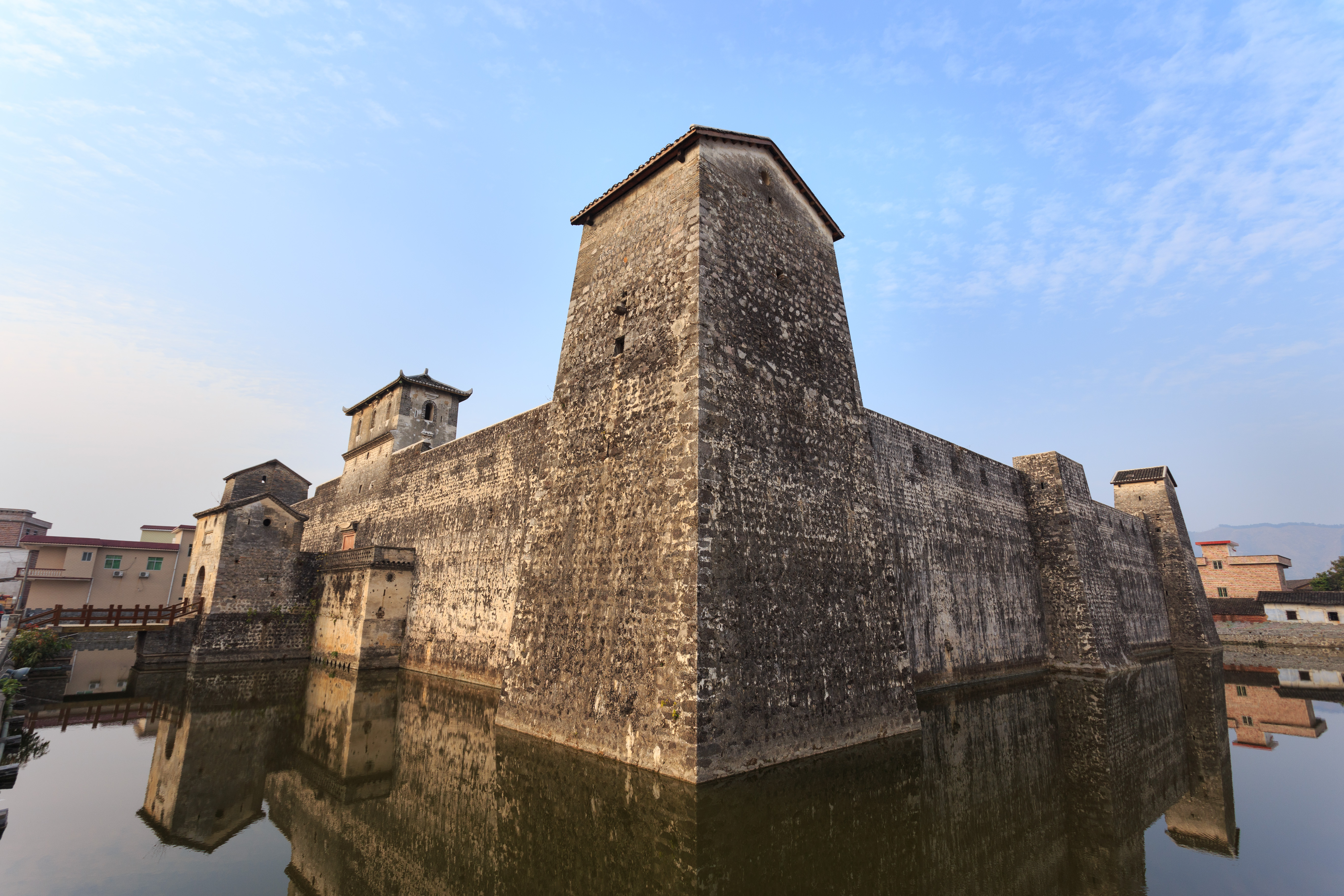
Shuangfengzhai castle, Renhua County

Some examples of Hakka walled villages are:

- Shuangfengzhai (zh:双峰寨)
- Mantangwei (zh:满堂围)
- Linzhai Sijiaolou (林寨四角楼)
- Huilonglou (会龙楼)
- Bajiaowei (仙坑八角楼)

In northern China, especially Shanxi province, fortified villages also exist.

- Xiangyu village (湘峪古堡)

== Fortified private residences ==
Fortified private residences built by wealthy landowning families can be found throughout China. Generally built to protect from threats of bandits or periods of civil unrests.

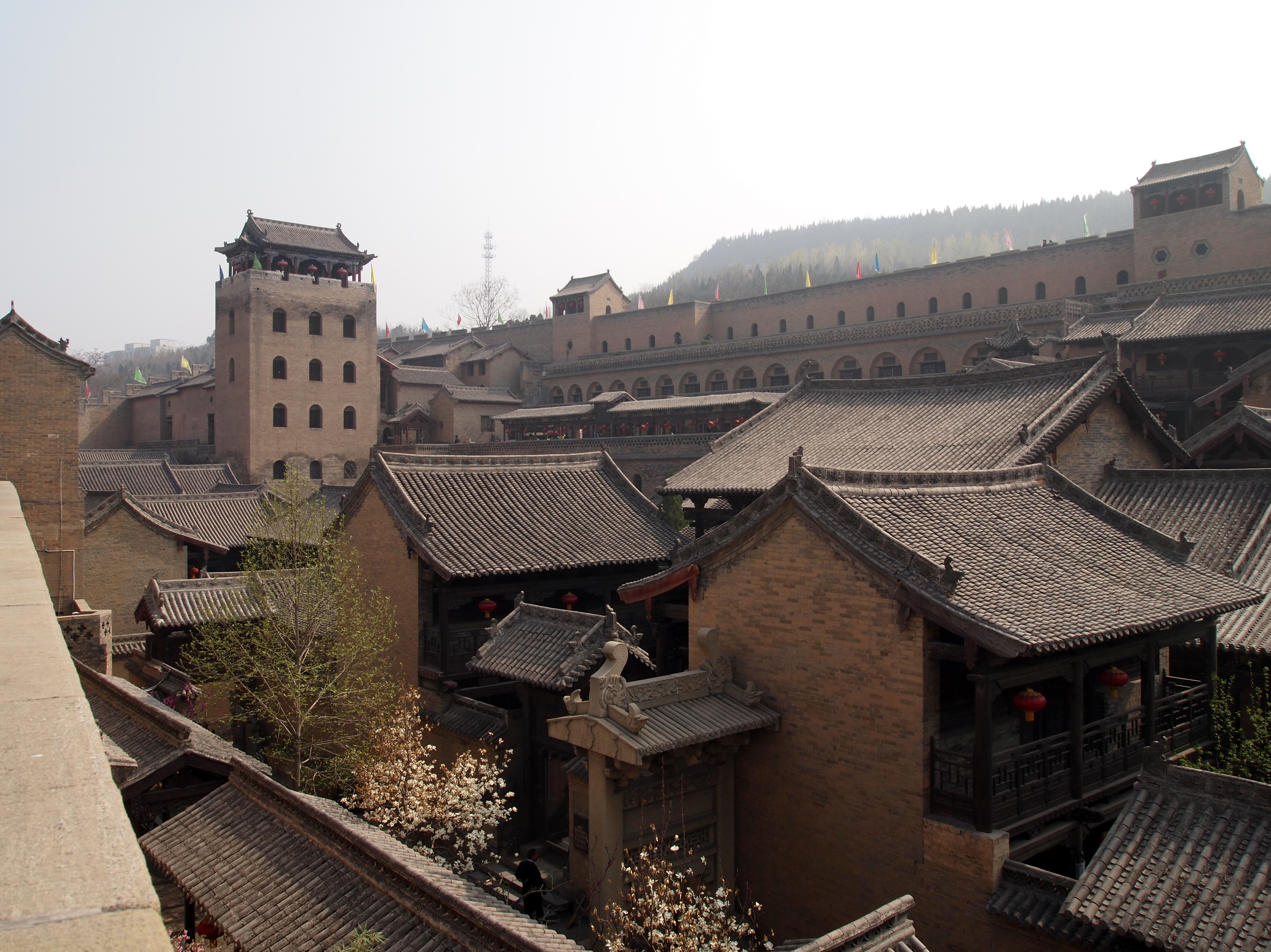
The Tower of Rivers and Mountains (河山楼) in the House of the Huangcheng Chancellor

Some examples in northern China are:

- Wang Family Compound (王家大院)
- House of the Huangcheng Chancellor (皇城相府)

In Fujian province, a unique type of fortified dwelling called Tu Bao (土堡) can be found, and are built with a similar technique as Japanese castles with dry stone base supporting rammed earth and wooden structure above.

- Anzhen castle, Yong'an (zh:安贞堡)
- Pipa castle (琵琶堡), Datian County
- Datian Castle (zh:大田土堡)

In Kaiping, Guandong province, multi-story fortified watchtower homes were built from the time of the Ming dynasty to the early 20th century.

- Kaiping Diaolou (开平碉楼)

== Military fortress ==
Fortified military fortresses are found at strategic locations such as mountain passes, along the great wall or part of the city walls of large towns and cities.

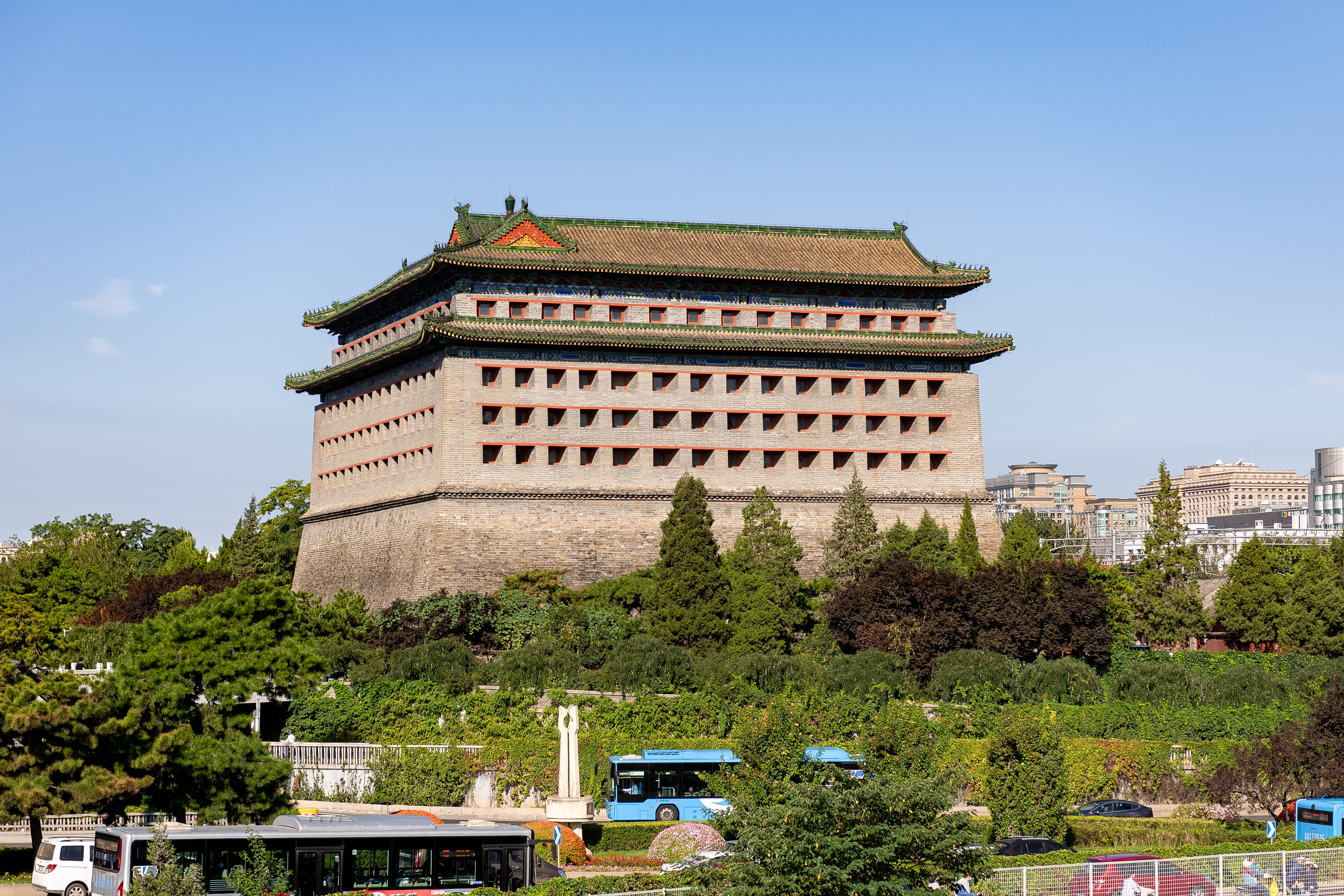
Beijing Southeast Corner Tower

- Shanhaiguan Castle (山海关)
- Juyongguan Castle (居庸关)
- Jiayuguan Castle (嘉峪关)
- Diaoyu Fortress (钓鱼城)
- Beijing city fortifications
- Qilu Fortress (zh:崎碌炮台)

== Tibetan Dzongs ==
Dzongs are a distinctive type of fortified monastery found in Tibetan areas such as Tibet Autonomous Region itself as well as parts of neighboring Qinghai and Sichuan provinces.

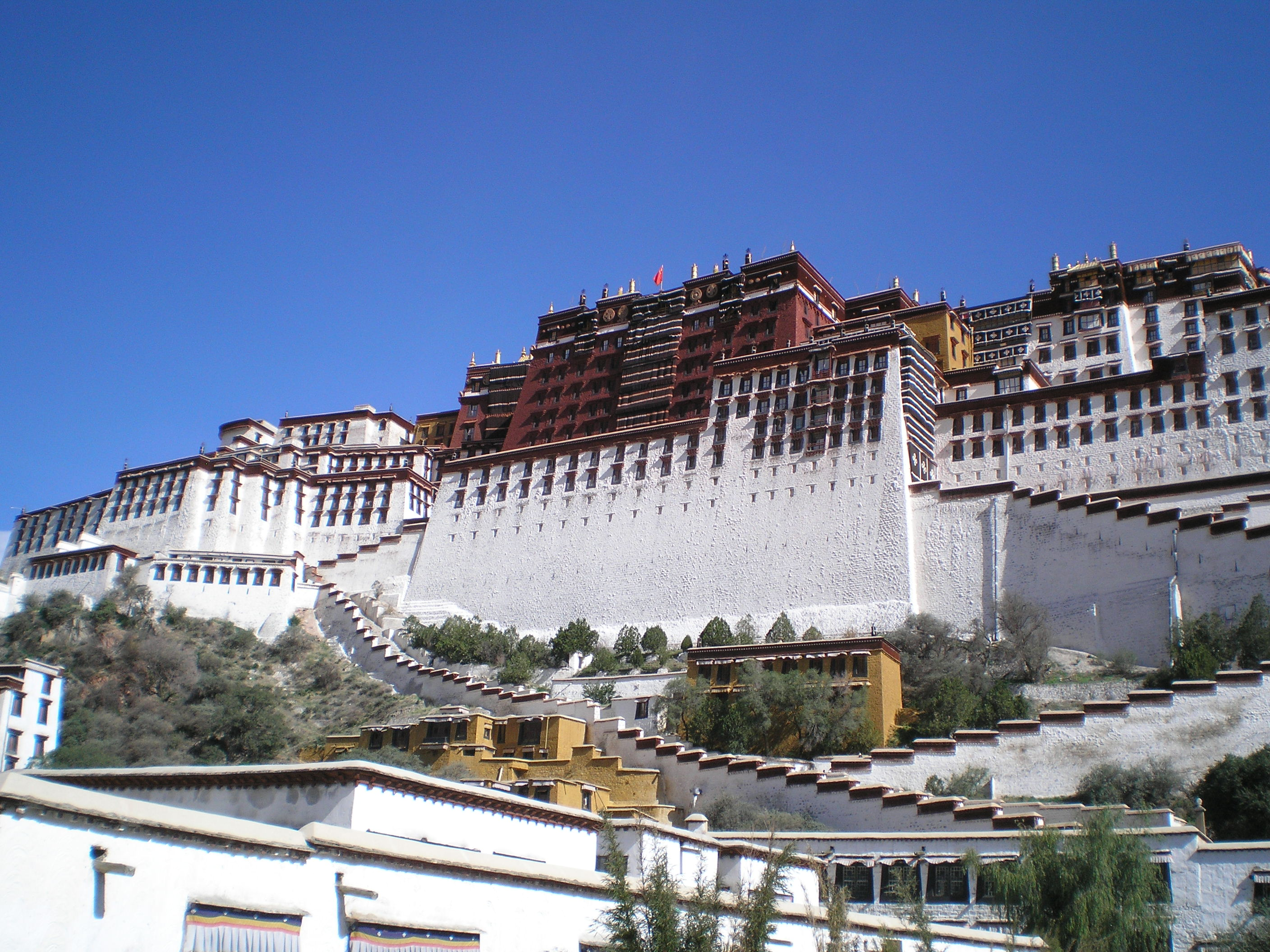
Potala Palace

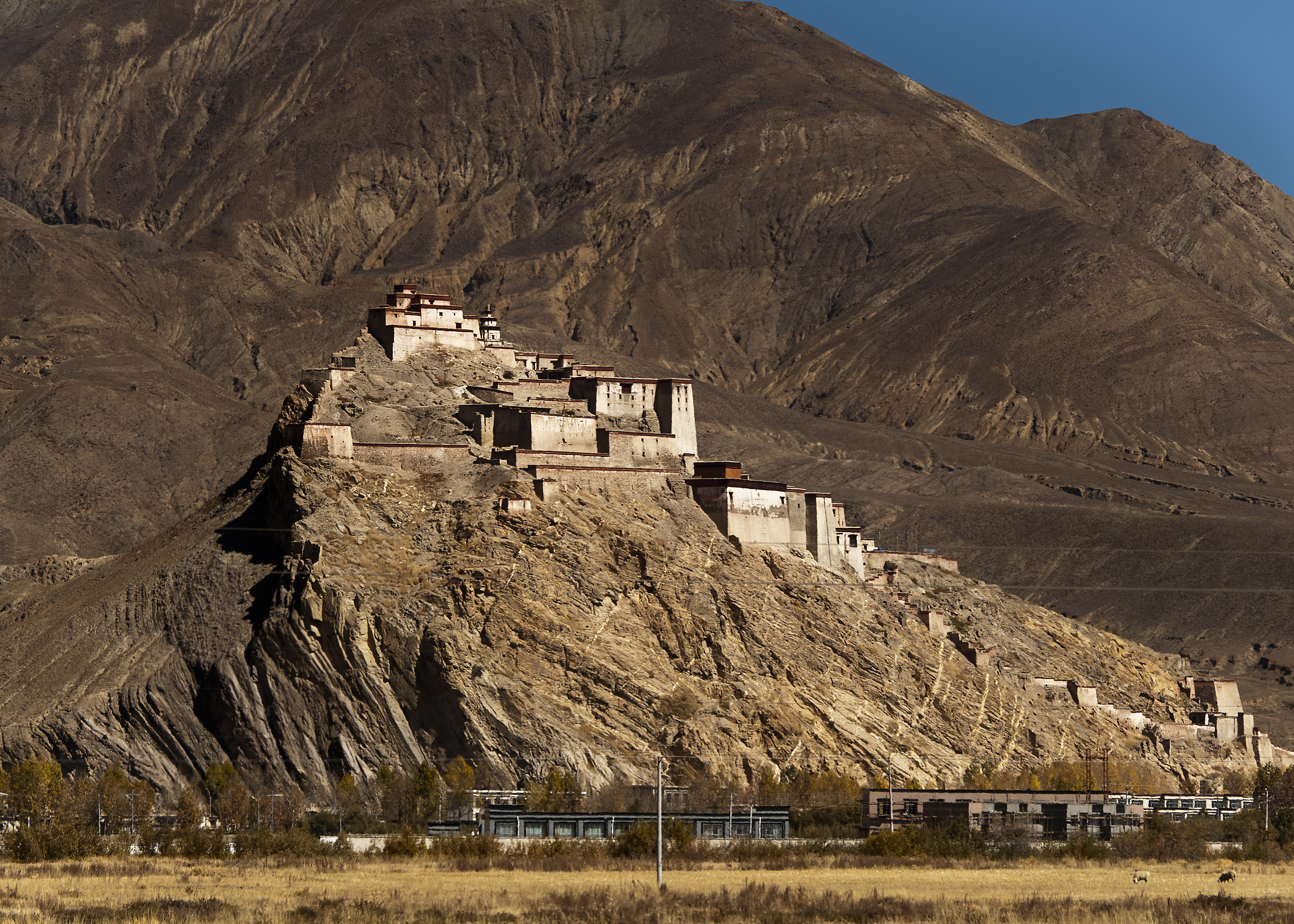
Gyantse Castle

- Potala Palace (པོ་ཏ་ལ་ཕོ་བྲང 布达拉宫)
- Gyantse Castle (རྒྱལ་རྩེ་རྫོང་། 江孜古堡)
- Kampa Castle (གམ་པ་རྫོང 岗巴古堡)

== Western-styled fortified architecture ==
As a result of contacts with the West and Christian missionaries from the 17th century onwards, western-styled fortified architecture, mainly Christian religious structures were also built.

- Our Lady of the Rosary Church in Daqi village, Zezhou County (zh:大箕玫瑰圣母堂)
- Monte da Guia Castle

== See also ==
- List of castles
- Category:Forts in China
