= You River (Yuan River tributary) =

River in China

Coordinates: 28°27′08″N 110°22′48″E

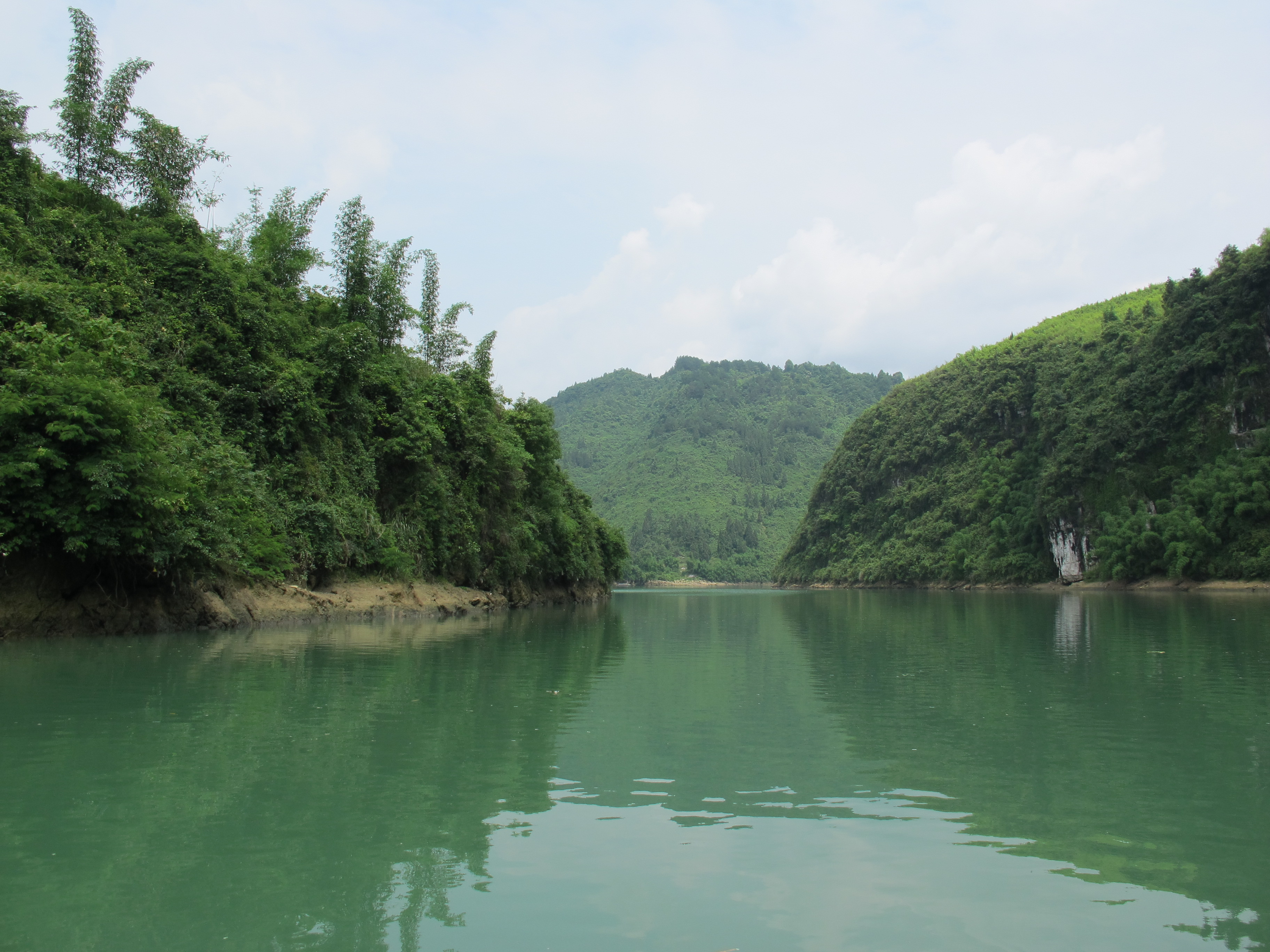

The You River (Chinese: 酉水; pinyin: yǒu shuǐ) is the largest tributary of the Yuan River, one of main rivers in the Wuling Mountains in Southwest China. Its other name is Gengshi River (Chinese: 更始水); it was called Youxi River (Chinese: 酉溪) in ancient times. Its trunk stream flows through Hubei, Chongqing and Hunan, and its drainage basin reaches into Guizhou. Its watershed covers an area of 19,254.3 square kilometres (7,434.1 sq mi), including 2,680.7 square kilometres (1,035.0 sq mi) of Hubei, 10,485.7 square kilometres (4,048.6 sq mi) of Hunan, 4,658.4 square kilometres (1,798.6 sq mi) of Chongqing and 1,519.5 square kilometres (586.7 sq mi) of Guizhou; it has a length of 484 kilometres (301 mi).

The valley of the You River was home of the ancient Ba people, the ancestors of the Tujia people. The You River basin is one of the birthplaces of Chinese civilization: the Qin Dynasty Bamboo Slips of Liye and the Tusi Sites of Laosicheng and Tangya were discovered in the region.

== Headwaters ==
The You River has two headstreams, the north and south sources. The north source, the Beihe River (Chinese: 北河) is the main stream; it originates in the Qizimei Mountains (Chinese: 七姊妹山) in Xuan'en County of Hubei. The south source, commonly named Meijiang River (Chinese: 梅江) or Xiushan River (Chinese: 秀山河) originates in Shanyangxi (Chinese: 山羊溪) of Songtao County, Guizhou. The Meijiang River merges into the main stream at Liangjiangkou (Chinese: 两江口) of Shiti Town (Chinese: 石堤镇) in Xiushan County of Chongqing.

The upper section of the main stream of the You River is named the Baishui River (Chinese: 白水河). It rises in the Qizimei Mountains (Chinese: 七姊妹山) of Yangliuhzhai Village (Chinese: 杨柳垞村) in Chunmuying Township (Chinese: 椿木营乡), Xuan'en.
