= You River =

You River may refer to the following rivers in China:

- You River (Guangxi) (右江; 'Right River'), a tributary of the Yong River
- You River (Tributary of Yuan River) (酉水), a tributary of the Yuan River in Hunan, Hubei, Chongqing and Guizhou
- You River (游) was a Song-dynasty river in northern China
