= Bozhou rebellion =

1590s rebellion in Ming China

- Part of the Miao rebellions
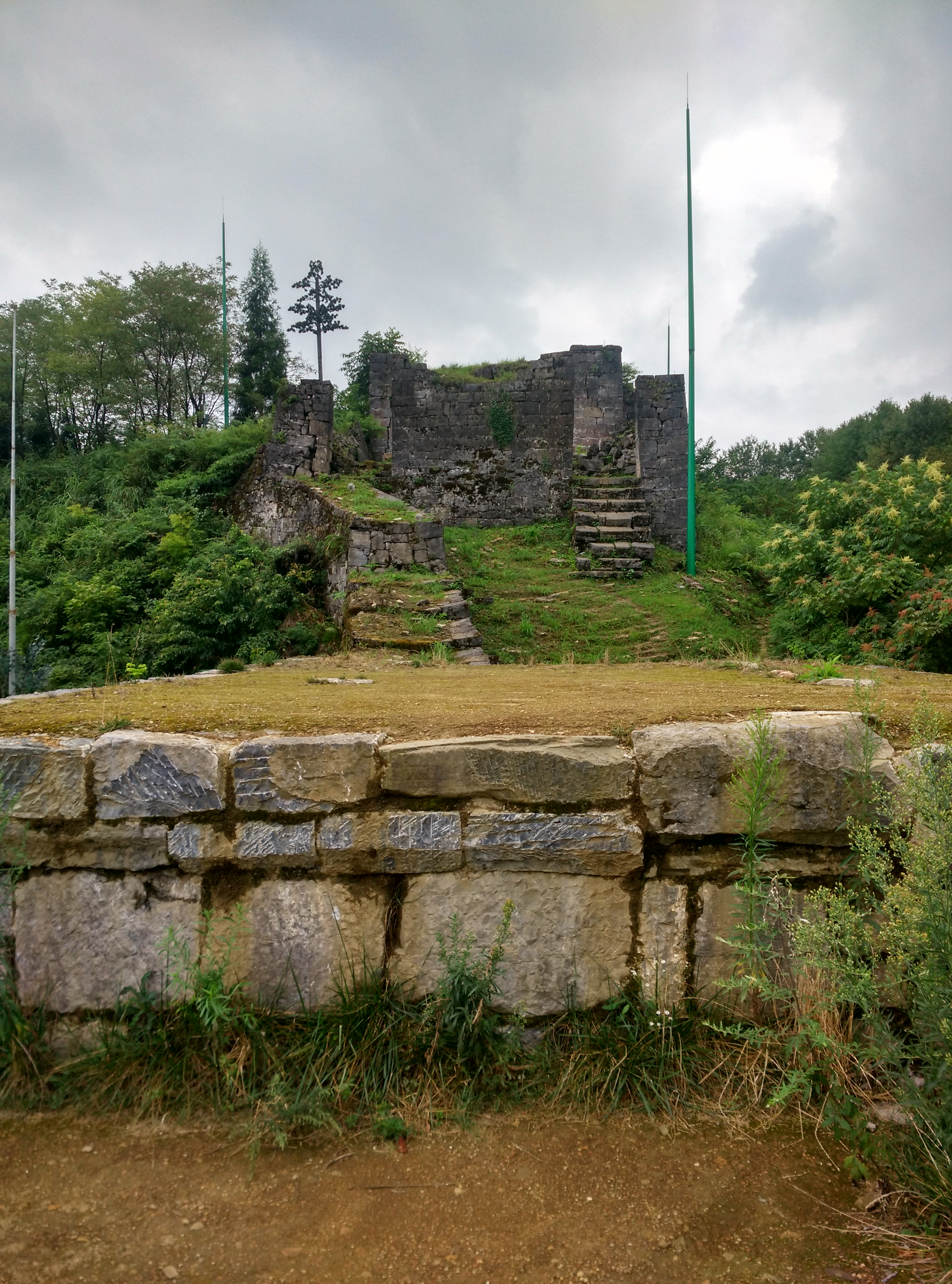
- Ruins of Hailongtun, the final stronghold of the Chiefdom of Bozhou in their resistance against the Ming army
Date	1589–1600
Location	Southwestern China
Result	Ming victory

Belligerents
Chiefdom of Bozhou	Ming dynasty

Commanders and leaders
Yang Yinglong †; Yang Chaodong (executed)	Li Hualong; Xing Jie; Guo Zizhang; Liu Ting; Chen Lin

Strength
140,000–150,000	200,000–240,000

Casualties and losses
22,687 killed 6,663 captured	Unknown

Chinese name
- Chinese: 播州之役
Transcriptions
Standard Mandarin
- Hanyu Pinyin: Bōzhōu Zhīyì

The Bozhou rebellion, or the Yang Yinglong rebellion, was an uprising led by Yang Yinglong, a chieftain of the Miao tribes located on the border of the Ming provinces of Huguang, Guizhou, and Sichuan in southwestern China. This rebellion took place in the 1590s and was aimed at challenging the rule of the Wanli Emperor.

The Ming authorities had been dealing with issues involving Yang Yinglong since 1587. In 1589, open conflict began and continued until 1600, with a brief pause for negotiations in 1594. Following the end of the war in Korea, the task of suppressing Yang's rebellion was given to Li Hualong, an official with military experience who arrived in Chongqing in 1599. He carefully planned a spring offensive, and the fighting in 1600 lasted for 104 days. According to Li's final report, over 22,000 rebels were killed, and Yang committed suicide. His chiefdom was then incorporated into the standard Chinese administrative system.

== Background ==
The Yang clan, descendants of a 9th-century Tang general, held control over Bozhou, a mountainous region on the border of Huguang, Guizhou, and Sichuan, spanning over 300 km (200 mi) from east to west and slightly less from north to south. For many centuries, the clan maintained their dominance over the area and, despite their Chinese origins, eventually assimilated and identified with the local Miao tribes. During the reign of Kublai Khan in the second half of the 13th century, they were granted the title of Xuan wei shi, or "pacification commissioner", of Bozhou. In the Ming dynasty, the chieftains of the Yang clan continued to hold the title of pacification commissioner and were given a secondary third official rank. They were also required to provide 200 tons of wood and other supplies, including horses, every three years. From time to time, at the request of the Ming authorities, they also provided soldiers to quell local unrest. However, other influential clans existed in the region alongside the Yang clan, and the Ming authorities occasionally had to intervene to resolve their conflicts.

Yang Yinglong inherited the position of pacification commissioner of Bozhou in 1571 after his father's death. He proved himself to be a skilled commander for the Ming during battles with other native groups and Tibetans, for which he was richly rewarded. His timber supply also gained recognition from the Ming court. Despite some officials accusing him, he was promoted to regional military commissioner and received the third major rank (3a). He became even more ambitious and viewed the Ming troops as weak. He became involved in disputes between local Miao tribes and Chinese colonists, often attacking the former. Initially, the government in Beijing refused to intervene, citing more pressing issues, and believed that Yang Yinglong was seeking personal glory, but the Ministry of War was eventually ordered to investigate and reorganize the local administration.

== First stage (1587–1599) ==
Places significant to the rebellion of Yang Yinglong on a map of Sichuan Province and its immediate surroundings:
– rebels;
– Ming authorities.
The provincial boundaries reflect the situation in the 21st century.

In 1587, Yang's actions became more extreme when he denounced his first wife under the influence of a new favorite concubine. He then proceeded to murder her family and plunder the region. The affected family reported this to the provincial authorities. This incident alienated Yang from other influential families in the region.

In 1590, open fighting broke out between Yang's Miao clans and their rival clans, drawing the attention of the Ming authorities. Grand Coordinator of Guizhou Ye Mengxiong (葉夢熊) accused Yang of 24 crimes, but the regional inspector in Sichuan, Li Hualong (李化龍), proposed pardoning Yang based on his past merits. The matter became stuck in interdepartmental consultations in Beijing. Despite this, armed clashes in the region continued and Ye Mengxiong eventually requested a military campaign against Bozhou. In response, Yang surrendered to the Sichuan authorities in early 1593, hoping for a more lenient approach than in Guizhou, but to his surprise, he was sentenced to death in Chongqing. In an attempt to save himself, Yang offered to pay 20,000 liang (746 kg) of silver, raise 5,000 soldiers, and personally lead them into war in Korea. The Wanli Emperor agreed, and the military commanders in Korea eagerly awaited the arrival of Miao reinforcements. The Japanese forces withdrew before Yang arrived and he returned home.

After returning to Guizhou, Yang broke his promise,going on to ravage several prefectures and counties while disregarding his obligations to the Ming authorities. He had several Ming officials who reminded him of these obligations killed, blaming the murders on the "wild" Miao tribes. This caused alarm among local Ming officials, who wrote reports to Beijing. In the spring of 1594, Grand Coordinator Wang Jiguang (王繼光), responsible for the security of Sichuan, led an army to march against Yang. He attacked from three directions. When the Ming troops reached the Lushan Pass, Yang sent negotiators to offer submission, but his army launched a surprise attack on the unprepared Ming columns and scattered them. The Ming army suffered heavy losses, lost almost all its supplies, and the campaign collapsed. The Emperor then dismissed Wang Jiguang from his position, and appointed Tan Xisi (譚希思) as the grand coordinator of Sichuan and Xing Jie (邢玠) as the supreme commander (zongdu) in Guizhou. A new campaign against Bozhou was planned, but was postponed due to the illness of Liu Chengsi (劉承嗣), the regional commander of the Sichuan troops.

In early 1595, Xing Jie arrived in Sichuan and urged Yang to surrender in order to save his life. The local powerful families also supported the campaign against Yang, hoping to destroy him. Yang's followers, on the other hand, feared that with the fall of the Yang power, they would also lose their positions. In the summer of 1595, Prefect of Chongqing Wang Shiqi (王士琦) began a trial against Yang. He initially sent his brother to the Ming authorities, and after a month he himself appeared. Yang was tried with 12 aides, who were sentenced to death and executed. Yang was able to secure his release by paying 40,000 liang of silver and agreed to relinquish his position in favor of his eldest son Yang Chaodong (楊朝棟) and his other son Yang Kedong (楊可棟). Yang Kedong would come to Chongqing as a hostage. At the same time, the Yang domain was reorganized, which led to a reduction in the power of the Yang family. The Emperor considered the matter resolved and rewarded the commanders involved. Wang Shiqi was promoted to grand coordinator of eastern Sichuan. Xing Jie returned to Beijing and was made censor-in-chief.

After being released and returning home, Yang Yinglong resumed his violent ways. He reasserted his control over the surrounding Miao tribes and built up financial reserves by having some of his wealthy subjects executed on petty pretexts and confiscating their property. During this time, Yang Kedong died in Chongqing. Despite having promised to pay a ransom, Yang Yinglong refused to do so on the grounds that the Ming authorities had refused to return his son's body to him. Within a year, he began leading raids into Huguang, Sichuan, and Guizhou. He even went as far as declaring himself emperor in Bozhou. Although his Miao warriors were brave and familiar with the terrain, they lacked proper equipment and were no match for a disciplined and organized army. In the beginning, they were successful in using guerrilla tactics and were able to capture supplies and weapons from defeated Ming troops, as well as loot forts and warehouses. This continued for three years, with his 100,000 Miao warriors spreading fear throughout the surrounding area. The Ming troops, however, remained resilient and continued to resist.

The Wanli Emperor, who was preoccupied with the war in Korea, postponed resolving the issues in the relatively peripheral southwest region of the empire. In an attempt to pacify the area, he sent Ma Qianxi, who had family ties to Yang, as a commissioner. Wang Shiqi was transferred to Korea in 1598. Taking advantage of the situation, Yang attacked government outposts in Sichuan and Huguang, destroying them along with the villages of his local enemies. Tan Xisi requested reinforcements to suppress the rebels and was granted 2,000 men, whom he stationed at strategic points.

== Second stage (1599–1600) ==
In 1599, following the end of the war in Korea, the Wanli Emperor turned his attention towards the affairs of the southwest region of the empire in a more organized manner. During this time, Grand Coordinator of Guizhou Jiang Dongzhi (江東之) gathered 3,000 men to combat the rebels in the spring of 1599, but they were ultimately defeated in southeastern Sichuan. The Emperor then replaced Jiang Dongzhi with the experienced official Guo Zichang (郭子章). Li Hualong, (Note: Li Hualong was a seasoned veteran of numerous border wars and was highly regarded for his ability to work effectively with both military and civilian colleagues. He was a skilled strategist who meticulously planned the supply of troops with weapons and equipment, and he made sure to request not only soldiers and supplies from the Ministry of War, but also experienced commanders. He also advised the Emperor to dismiss the eunuch tax collectors, whom he believed were inciting rebellion among the people (although the Emperor refused to do so). Additionally, he urged local authorities to organize a militia (baojia).) the former censor-in-chief, was promoted to vice minister of war and given responsibility for military affairs in Sichuan, Huguang, and Guizhou. Additionally, the Emperor sent a group of generals and officers from Korea to assist in the efforts.

Li arrived in Sichuan in the summer of 1599 and immediately began recruiting troops and constructing defensive positions. Yang Yinglong continued his attacks with a force of 80,000 men. On 7 August, the Ming commander Zhang Liangxian successfully surprised and defeated a rebel force, but was ultimately forced to retreat to Qijiang on the border of Sichuan and Guizhou. The rebels then laid siege to the city, using their own artillery to capture it and kill the Ming garrison, including its commander. Yang then launched a series of raids in the region, declaring himself the pacification commissioner of the Zhuangs and distributing captured territory among his supporters. He also began collecting taxes.

After the rebels conquered Qijiang, the Wanli Emperor dismissed Tan Xisi and Jiang Dongzhi, demoting them to common subjects, while he expanded the powers of Li Hualong, who led the struggle on the Ming side with Guo Zichang. Li played a crucial role in overall planning, strategy, and distribution of supplies and materials. Another key figure was Li Rumei, who, along with Guo, mobilized Chinese and indigenous soldiers and built defensive positions around the rebel territory. Upon returning from Korea, the renowned and feared general Liu Ting (Note: Liu Ting (d. 1619) came from a military family based in Nanchang in Jiangxi Province, and his father served as a provincial military commander. He accompanied his father in the war against the Burmese along the Yunnan–Burmese frontier, where he distinguished himself in 1583. From 1585 he served in Sichuan, and between 1592 and 1593 he fought in the war against Japan in Korea.) (劉鋌, known as "Big Sword"), who had previous connections with Yang Yinglong's family from the time when he and his father served in the region, joined Li Hualong's staff. Other notable generals included Chen Lin, an expert in firearms, rifles, and cannons who had served under Admiral Yi Sun-sin in Korea, and Ma Gui and Wu Guang, known for their personal bravery.

The rebels continued to clash throughout the year, attacking major cities such as Chongqing and Chengdu. The Emperor called on the rebel leaders to submit, giving them the choice to either side with traitor Yang Yinglong or kill him and retain their positions. He also ordered the Ministry of War to mobilize troops from Shaanxi, Gansu, Yansui, and Zhejiang. In late 1599, Li Hualong was ordered to move from Chongqing to direct the mobilization of forces from Sichuan, Huguang, and Guizhou. The Emperor also wrote letters to local tribal chieftains to secure their cooperation. Yang sent spies into Ming territory to destroy transportation infrastructure, bridges, and roads, and fortify his territory. As the Ming troops began advancing against the rebels in late 1599/1600, a number of minor clashes broke out. Initially, Yang's Miao warriors were successful, burning down several towns along the Sichuan-Guizhou border and temporarily cutting off some Ming communications. The Ming's superiority soon became apparent and they began to win and advance. The Ming troops were constantly reinforced, eventually reaching a total of 240,000 soldiers from across the empire, including a unit composed of captured Japanese. In response, Yang attempted to mobilize indigenous warriors to counter the superior Ming troops, who were much better armed with firearms, but was only able to gather around 150,000. (Note: Ray Huang in The Cambridge History of China, Volume 7 states approximately 40,000–50,000 rebels and 200,000 soldiers on the Ming side.) The Ming armies were also largely composed of local natives.

== Final Ming offensive of 1600 ==
After thorough preparations, Li Hualong convened a meeting in Chongqing in March 1600 to determine the overall strategy. He divided the Ming forces into eight armies, each consisting of 30,000 soldiers, with a composition of 30% Chinese and 70% indigenous troops, mainly Miao. The plan was for these armies to launch simultaneous attacks from different directions, with the goal of dividing and defeating the rebels in a piecemeal fashion. Four armies were to depart from Sichuan, with the most crucial attack targeting the rebels' heavily fortified Qijiang, led by regional commander of Sichuan Liu Ting. Three armies were to advance from Guizhou, and the last one from Huguang. Guo Zichang directed operations in Guizhou Province from its capital, Guiyang, while Grand Coordinator of Sichuan Zhi Keda (支可大), oversaw the province. Jiang Duo (江鐸), as grand coordinator and superintendent of military affairs in Pianyuan, was in charge of southern Huguang.

On 26 March 1600, eight Ming armies launched an offensive. The Ming generals agreed on a slow advance, arguing that it was necessary to secure communications and rear areas and not trust rebels who would surrender. They systematically pushed back the enemy in a series of minor engagements, with Ming artillery repeatedly destroying the palisades that the rebels were trying to fortify key passes with. In mid-April, Yang Chaodong led tens of thousands of men to attack Liu Ting's army. Liu stood at the forefront of his army, holding money in one hand and a sword in the other, and shouted to the enemy, "Miaos! Whoever obeys me will be rewarded, and whoever disobeys me will feel the edge of my sword". The Miaos panicked and began to flee, shouting "Big Sword Liu is here!". Yang Chaodong barely escaped with his life from the ensuing defeat. After that, the rebels were unable to break free from their defenses, but the Ming army's advance was not easy. In the mountainous terrain, the rebels skillfully defended themselves by building palisades in the passes, attacking from ambush, and even cutting down a bridge carrying Ming soldiers. Nevertheless, the Ming army continued to advance, replacing the demolished bridges with pontoons and using their superiority in firearms.

In mid-May 1600, Liu Ting's army had advanced deep into rebel territory, prompting Yang Yinglong to lead his forces into battle. Liu divided his army into two wings, effectively trapping the enemy between them. Yang was ultimately defeated and forced to retreat to Hailongtun, a fortress so inaccessible that it was said only a monkey or a bird could penetrate it. By early June, Ming troops had surrounded Hailongtun, but a week of heavy rain in the middle of the month made the terrain muddy and halted the attackers' progress. Once the weather improved on 28 June, the Ming troops were able to capture the rebel outposts and begin their assault on the fortress itself. Yang had 17,000 men at Hailongtun. The fortress fell in the final assault on 15 July, and in a desperate situation, Yang committed suicide by self-immolation on 21 July. His brother and eldest son were taken prisoner.

== Consequences ==
According to official reports, during 104 days of fighting in 1600, a total of 22,687 rebels were killed, 1,124 were captured, 5,539 civilians were captured, 126,211 Miao surrendered, 1,614 prisoners were freed, and 767 cattle and 4,444 weapons were captured. Additionally, tax arrears were forgiven in the areas affected by the war. Expenditures for the Ming campaign was 1.5 million silver taels in total. Yang Yinglong's captured brother and eldest son were taken to Beijing and executed.

The Chiefdom of Bozhou was abolished and its territory was reorganized into two prefectures: Zunyi, which was incorporated into Sichuan, and Pingyue (平越), which was incorporated into Guizhou. Over the next decade, the Ming military continued to carry out successful operations in the southwest, suppressing several minor revolts and facilitating the colonization of the region. In order to prevent future large-scale rebellions, the Ming authorities implemented a systematic Sinicization of the area, which involved the colonization of Chinese people, the establishment of schools, and the reorganization of native administrations into standard Chinese subprefectures and counties.
