= Tangya Tusi Fortress =

Coordinates: 29°41′26″N 109°00′19″E

The Tangya Tusi Fortress (Chinese: 唐崖土司城址; pinyin: Tángyá Tǔsī ChéngZhǐ) is located in Tangya Town (Chinese: 唐崖镇), Xianfeng County, Hubei Province, China. It is one of the three Tusi Sites designated by the UNESCO as a World Heritage Site, designated on July 3, 2015. The site is the historic capital of Qin clan Tusi (Chinese: 覃氏土司) of Tangya, the Qin clan were the rulers of the Tangya Tusi and hereditarily governed a territory of 600 square kilometres (230 sq mi) for four centuries in the modern-day Xianfeng County. As the capital, the site was built in 1355 (late Yuan dynasty) and abandoned in 1755 (Qing dynasty).
