= Laosicheng =

Archaeological site in Hunan, China

Coordinates: 28°59′55″N 109°58′01″E

Laosicheng (Chinese: 老司城; pinyin: Lǎosīchéng) is an archaeological site in Sicheng Village (Chinese: 司城村) of Lingxi Town, Yongshun County, Hunan Province, China. It is one of the three Tusi Sites designated by the UNESCO as a World Heritage Site, designated on July 3, 2015. The site is the historic capital of Peng clan Tusi (Chinese: 彭氏土司) for six centuries in modern-day Yongshun, built in 1135 (Southern Song dynasty) and abandoned in 1724 (Qing dynasty). Its original name was Fushicheng (福石城) or Fushi City.

Located by the riverside of Lingxi River (Chinese: 灵溪河), the upstream section of Niulu River (Chinese: 牛路河) which is the second-level tributary of You River, Laosicheng site is the first world cultural heritage site in Hunan province, and also the largest, earliest and best-preserved ancient Tusi city in China. Laosicheng site covers a total area of 25 square kilometers, its core zone has an area of more than 250,000 square meters, in an urban layout of road networks and drainage systems. The relics unearthed included the Hall of Patriarch, Patriarch Temple of the Peng clan, the tombs of Tusi chieftains, ancient streets, ancient city walls, memorial arches, bronze bells and stone horses. It is known as a sacred place of the Tujia culture.
