= Xianfeng County =

Xianfeng County 咸丰县 Sienfeng
- County
- Location of the seat in Hubei
- Coordinates: 29°39′55″N 109°08′23″E
- Country: People's Republic of China
- Province: Hubei
- Prefecture: Enshi

Area
  - Total: 2,550 km^{2} (980 sq mi)

Population (2020)
  - Total: 318,827
  - Density: 125/km^{2} (324/sq mi)
- Time zone: UTC+8 (China Standard)
- Postal code: 445600
- Area code: 0718
- Website: www.xianfeng.gov.cn

Xianfeng County (simplified Chinese: 咸丰县; traditional Chinese: 咸豐縣; pinyin: Xiánfēng Xiàn) is a county in the southwest of Hubei province, People's Republic of China, bordering Chongqing to the southwest. It is under the administration of the Enshi Tujia and Miao Autonomous Prefecture.

== Administrative Divisions ==
Six towns:

- Gaoleshan (高乐山镇), Zhongbao (忠堡镇), Pingbaying (坪坝营镇, former Jiamachi 甲马池镇), Chaoyangsi (朝阳寺镇), Qingping (清坪镇), Tangya (唐崖镇)

Four townships:

- Dingzhai Township (丁寨乡), Huolongping Township (活龙坪乡), Xiaocun Township (小村乡), Huangjindong Township (黄金洞乡)

One other area:

- Daluba Zone (大路坝区)

== Climate ==
Climate data for Xianfeng, elevation 777 m (2,549 ft), (1991–2020 normals, extremes 1981–present)
Month	Jan	Feb	Mar	Apr	May	Jun	Jul	Aug	Sep	Oct	Nov	Dec	Year
Record high °C (°F)	18.7 (65.7)	23.7 (74.7)	29.9 (85.8)	32.7 (90.9)	33.0 (91.4)	35.0 (95.0)	36.4 (97.5)	36.7 (98.1)	35.0 (95.0)	29.8 (85.6)	26.2 (79.2)	19.8 (67.6)	36.7 (98.1)
Mean daily maximum °C (°F)	6.7 (44.1)	9.0 (48.2)	13.8 (56.8)	19.8 (67.6)	23.7 (74.7)	26.7 (80.1)	29.3 (84.7)	29.5 (85.1)	25.1 (77.2)	19.4 (66.9)	14.5 (58.1)	8.9 (48.0)	18.9 (66.0)
Daily mean °C (°F)	3.2 (37.8)	5.2 (41.4)	9.2 (48.6)	14.6 (58.3)	18.6 (65.5)	21.9 (71.4)	24.4 (75.9)	24.0 (75.2)	20.1 (68.2)	14.9 (58.8)	10.1 (50.2)	5.0 (41.0)	14.3 (57.7)
Mean daily minimum °C (°F)	0.9 (33.6)	2.6 (36.7)	6.0 (42.8)	10.9 (51.6)	15.0 (59.0)	18.6 (65.5)	21.0 (69.8)	20.4 (68.7)	16.8 (62.2)	12.1 (53.8)	7.4 (45.3)	2.5 (36.5)	11.2 (52.1)
Record low °C (°F)	−6.3 (20.7)	−6.0 (21.2)	−3.4 (25.9)	0.5 (32.9)	6.8 (44.2)	11.4 (52.5)	13.9 (57.0)	13.2 (55.8)	9.8 (49.6)	2.5 (36.5)	−2.2 (28.0)	−5.8 (21.6)	−6.3 (20.7)
Average precipitation mm (inches)	30.1 (1.19)	42.2 (1.66)	73.5 (2.89)	130.3 (5.13)	188.0 (7.40)	223.4 (8.80)	213.4 (8.40)	189.9 (7.48)	132.2 (5.20)	122.8 (4.83)	65.0 (2.56)	25.1 (0.99)	1,435.9 (56.53)
Average precipitation days (≥ 0.1 mm)	12.5	12.2	15.1	16.2	17.5	17.0	16.6	14.7	13.0	15.0	12.3	11.2	173.3
Average snowy days	7.4	4.1	1.3	0.1	0	0	0	0	0	0	0.4	2.8	16.1
Average relative humidity (%)	83	82	82	82	83	85	84	83	84	86	85	83	84
Mean monthly sunshine hours	40.8	40.0	70.0	93.9	105.6	97.4	142.2	163.5	103.0	73.4	64.6	50.8	1,045.2
Percentage possible sunshine	13	13	19	24	25	23	33	40	28	21	20	16	23
Source: China Meteorological Administration
