= Hailongtun =

Fortress in Guizhou

- 海龍屯 (Chinese)
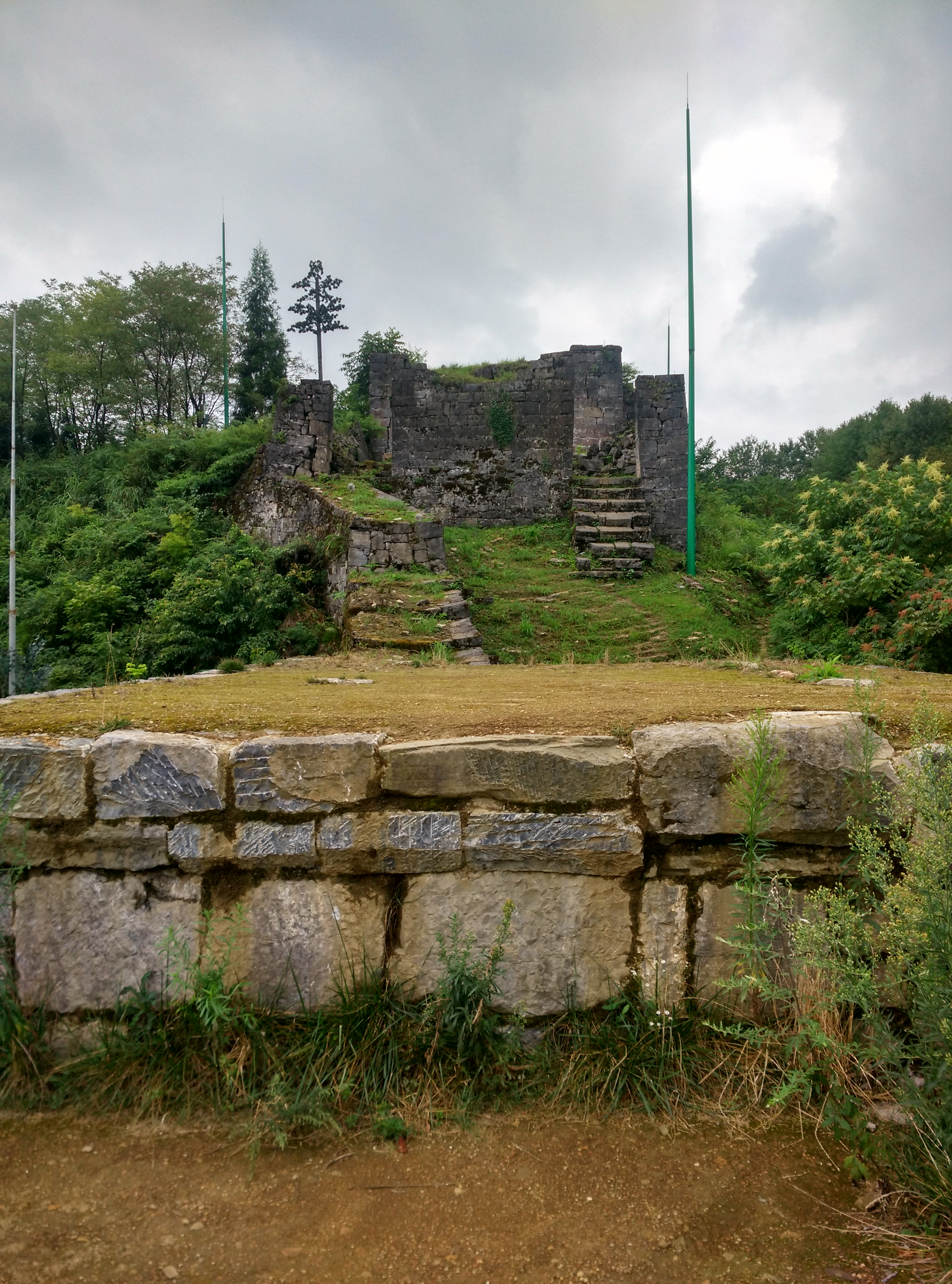

- Location within China
- 27°48′43″N 106°49′00″E

History
- Built: 1257
- Demolished: 1600

Hailongtun (simplified Chinese: 海龙屯; traditional Chinese: 海龍屯; pinyin: Hǎilóngtún; lit. 'Sea Dragon Castle') is a ruined fortress on the Longyan Mountain, in Hailongtun Village, Gaoping Town, Zunyi City, Guizhou Province, China. It was the stronghold of the Chiefdom of Bozhou until its destruction by the Ming dynasty after the Bozhou rebellion. Considered the only well-preserved site of a true feudal castle in China, Hailongtun is one of the three Tusi sites designated by the UNESCO as a World Heritage Site on July 3, 2015.

Hailongtun was established in 1257 during the Southern Song dynasty. It served as the stronghold of the Chiefdom of Bozhou, ruled by the Yang family, from the Southern Song to the Ming dynasty. In the 28th year of the Wanli reign (1600), the Ming defeated the Bozhou rebellion, with the last tusi Yang Yinglong committing suicide and the castle was burned down.

The castle occupies a total area of 1.59 square kilometres (0.61 mi^{2}), with 6 eastern and 3 western passes and walls nearly 6 kilometres (3.7 mi) long. It is surrounded by cliffs on all four sides with only one entrance from the mountain road. The pass on the mountain side was known as the Feihu Pass. The one to the east was called Feilong Pass. At the foot of the right hill is a copper column pass, whereas at the base of the left hill is the iron column pass.

The castle's architecture reflects its strategic importance. The city gates were flanked by archer's towers. Although there is nothing to support the tale, it is said that once a large stone wall, wide enough to allow horses to gallop on it, connected all of the passes. A deep moat surrounded the city.
