= Tusi Sites =

UNESCO World Heritage Site
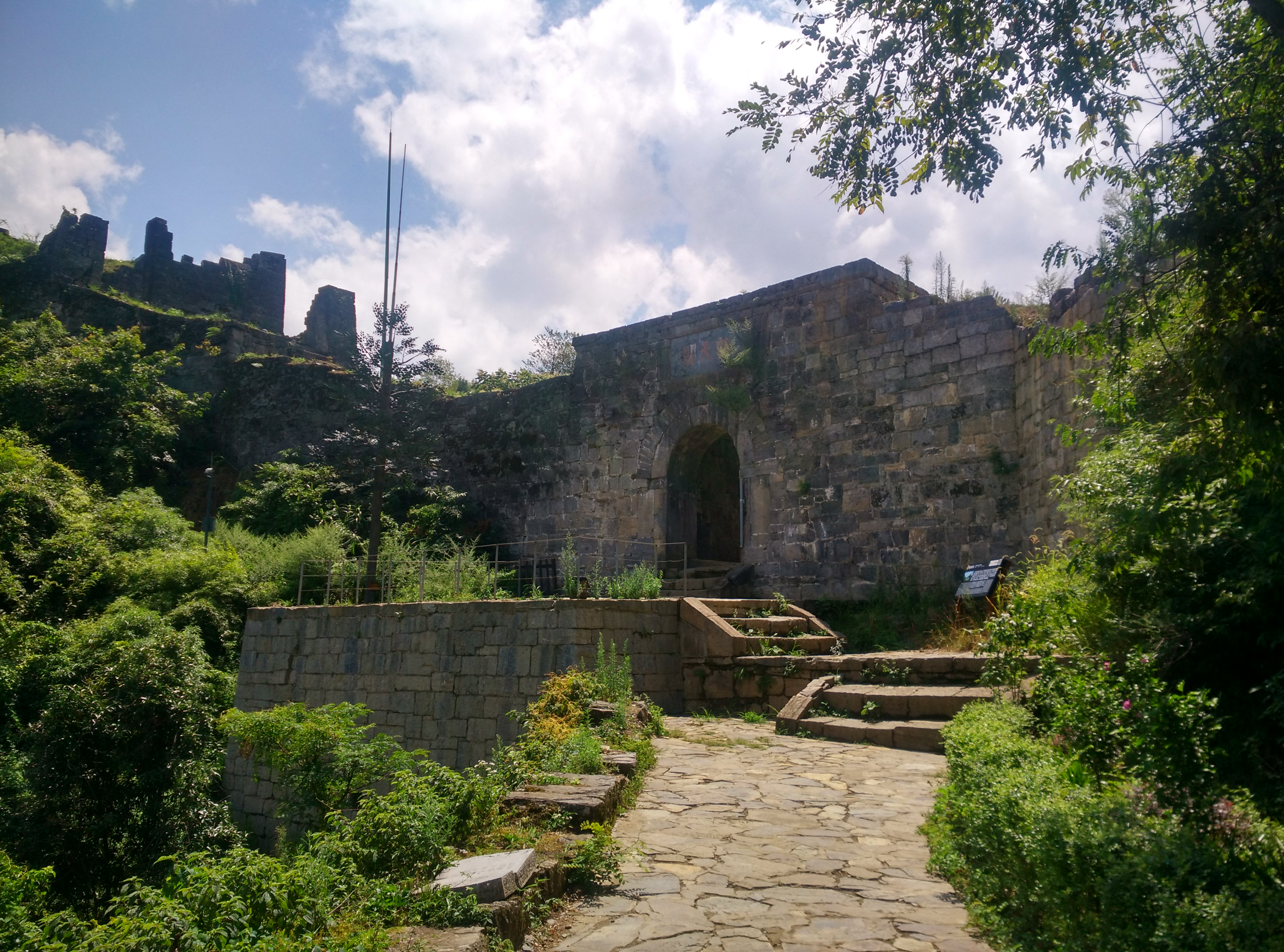
- Ruins of Hailongtun fortress

- Location within China
- Location: China
- Criteria: Cultural: (ii), (iii)
- Reference: 1474
- Inscription: 2015 (39th Session)
- Area: 781.28 ha (1,930.6 acres)
- Buffer zone: 3,125.33 ha (7,722.9 acres)
- Coordinates: 28°59′55″N 109°58′1″E

The Tusi Sites (Chinese: 土司遗址; pinyin: Tǔsī Yízhǐ) refer to the three ancient Tusi sites in China that were designated by UNESCO as a World Heritage Site on July 3, 2015. It is the 48th World Heritage Site in China. These sites are located in the mountains of Southwest China and exemplify the unique tusi governance system that survived the 13th through the 20th centuries.

== Background ==
The tusi were hereditary tribal leaders that were appointed as officials by the imperial government in China during the Yuan, Ming, and Qing dynasties. It was a political system adopted by Chinese emperors to govern ethnic minority regions in south-central and southwest China, and the granted many ethnic groups in China some degree of political autonomy. The tusi system was used for a thousand years.

== Description ==
The world heritage site is composed of three separate sites that combine to represent the tusi system:

- Laosicheng was the capital of the Peng Tusi from 1135 to 1724, and is the largest and best-preserved of the ancient Tusi cities. The Peng Tusi governed an area of mainly Tujia people and were in the upper ranks of the Tusi system, governing a large territory.
- The Hailongtun Fortress was established during the Song dynasty in 1257 and was a stronghold of the Chiefdom of Bozhou before it was surrendered in 1601. Similar to the Peng Tusi in Laosicheng, the Chiefdom of Bozhou were high-ranking tusi and governed a large territory, where Gelao people and Miao people lived.
- Tangya was the capital of the Qin Tusi, which ruled over 600 square kilometers for four centuries. It was built in 1355 and abandoned in 1735. In contrast to the other two sites, Tangya is relatively small, indicating that the Qin Tusi were much less prestigious than the rulers at the other two sites.

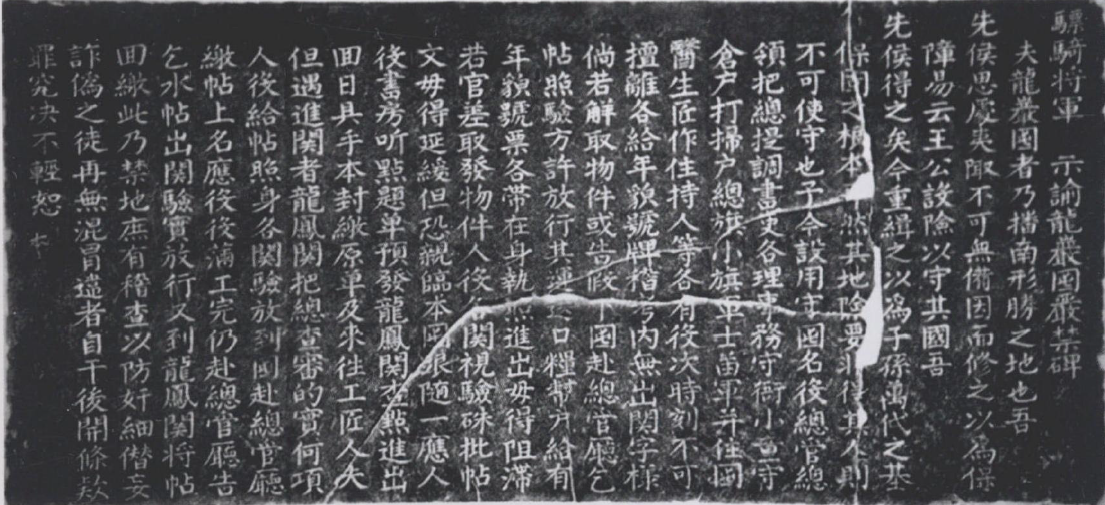
A monument of Hailongtun

== World Heritage Site ==
On July 3, 2015, the three Tusi sites were added to the World Cultural Heritage List during the 39th session of the World Heritage Committee in Bonn, Germany. The committee said the Tusi system aimed at unifying national administration while simultaneously allowing ethnic minorities to retain their customs and way of life.

UNESCO Inscription No	Name	Location	Coordinates	Area
1474-001	Laosicheng Tusi Domain	Yongshun County, Hunan	28°59′55″N 109°58′01″E	Property: 534.24 Ha; Buffer zone: 1023.93 Ha
1474-002	Tangya Tusi Domain	Xianfeng County, Hubei	29°41′26″N 109°00′19″E	Property: 86.62 Ha; Buffer zone: 973.61 Ha
1474-003	Hailongtun Tusi Fortress	Huichuan District, Zunyi, Guizhou	27°48′42″N 106°49′01″E	Property: 160.42 Ha; Buffer zone: 1127.79 Ha
