= Caijia Jialing River Rail Transit Bridge =

Railway bridge in Chongqing, China

The Caijia Jialing River Rail Transit Bridge is a metro bridge in Chongqing, China. The bridge is between Jinshansi and Caojiawan Stations and allows Chongqing Metro Line 6 the Jialing River north into the New North Zone. The bridge is 1,250 meters long and has a main span of 250 meters. The deck of the bridge is the highest metro only bridge in the world carrying Line 6 trains 100m over the surface of the Jialing River.
