= Chongqing Rail Transit =

Rapid transit system in Chongqing, China

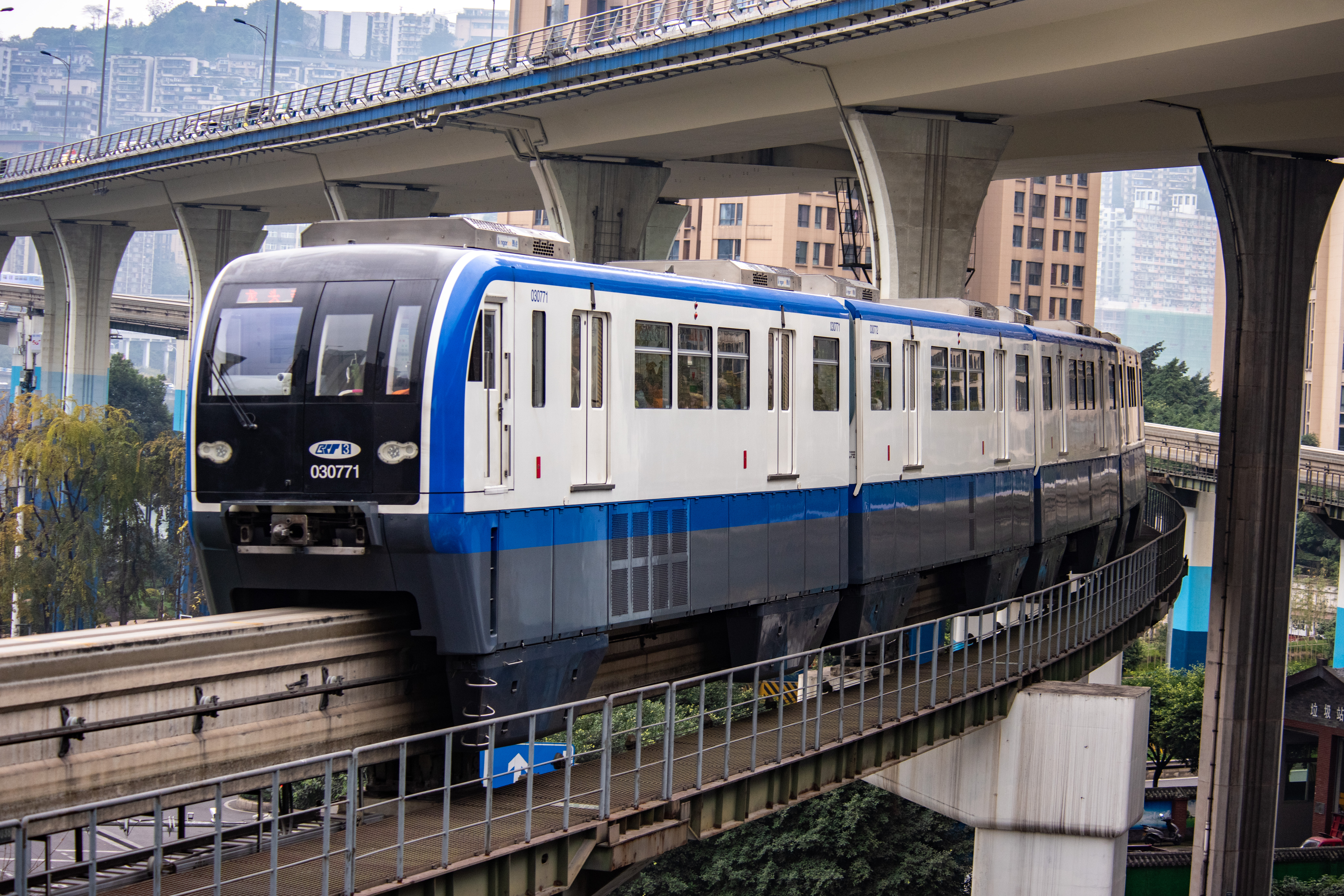

Overview
- Native name: 重庆轨道交通
- Owner: Chongqing City Transportation Development & Investment (Group) Co., Ltd.
- Area served: Chongqing Urban Area
- Locale: Chongqing, China
- Transit type: Conventional rapid transit Straddle-beam monorail metro
- Number of lines: 13 (Note: 14 if the International Expo Line was counted as an independent line.)
- Number of stations: 342
- Daily ridership: 6.15 million (peak on 31 December 2025)
- Annual ridership: 1.445 billion (2024)
- Chief executive: Le Mei
- Headquarters: 123 Renmin Rd., Yuzhong District, Chongqing
- Website: http://www.cqmetro.cn

Operation
- Began operation: 6 November 2004; 22 years ago (trial); 18 June 2005; 21 years ago (officially)
- Operators: Chongqing Rail Transit (Group) Co., Ltd.
- Number of vehicles: 561
- Headway: 2.5 to 12.5 min

Technical
- System length: 621.98 km (386.48 mi) (Note: Excluding separate networks, such as Bishan SkyShuttle or Yangtze River Ropeway.); 525.43 km (326.49 mi); 96.55 km (59.99 mi)
- Track gauge: 1,435 mm (4 ft 8 1/2 in)
- Electrification: Overhead line, 1,500 V DC / 25 kV 50 Hz AC; Contact rails, 1,500 V DC
- Average speed: 35.0–60.0 km/h (21.7–37.3 mph); 30.6–34.8 km/h (19.0–21.6 mph)
- Top speed: 100–140 km/h (62–87 mph); 75 km/h (47 mph)
System map

Chongqing Rail Transit
- Simplified Chinese: 重庆轨道交通
- Traditional Chinese: 重慶軌道交通
Transcriptions
Standard Mandarin
- Hanyu Pinyin: Chóngqìng Guǐdào Jiāotōng
other Mandarin
- Sichuanese Pinyin: Cong^{2}qin^{4} Gui^{3}dao^{4} Jiao^{1}tong^{1}

The Chongqing Rail Transit (branded as CRT; also known as Chongqing Metro) is the rapid transit system in the city of Chongqing, China. Opened in 2004, it is the world's 6th-largest metro system by length, at 621.98 km (386 mi), the largest monorail system, and holds the world records for the highest and deepest metro stations, both on the same line. The system serves all 8 central districts of the city as well as nearby suburbs. CRT consists of 12 heavy rail metro lines: 1, 4, 5, 6, 9, 10, 15, 18, the Loop line, Jiangtiao line, and Bitong line, while Lines 2 and 3 are high-capacity heavy monorails.

As of November 2026, 4 new metro lines (7, 17, 24, 27) and 4 extensions are under construction with a combined additional length of 210 km.

The Chongqing Rail Transit is uniquely shaped by the city's steep, mountainous terrain and multiple river valleys carved by the Yangtze and Jialing rivers. Liziba station, a monorail station built inside a residential building, serves as one of its most iconic examples.

Two lines use heavy-monorail technology, leveraging the ability to negotiate steep grades and tight curves and rapid transit capacity. They are capable of transporting 32,000 passengers per hour per direction. However the busiest section of Line 3 reaches a peak passenger volume of 37,700 pphpd in 2019. At 98 km (61 mi), the system's two monorail lines form the longest monorail system in the world, with Line 3 being the world's longest single monorail line. The length and the capacity of its monorail network both also make it the world's busiest monorail system, with a total of 94 million and 250 million rides in 2015 on Line 2 and Line 3, respectively. Line 3 is therefore the world's busiest single monorail line.

The extreme difference in elevation between the river valleys and the hilly plateaus of Chongqing poses a unique challenge in designing alignments for conventional rail transit lines. The network currently has the world's highest metro-only bridge, the Caijia Rail Transit Bridge of Line 6 spanning the Jialing River valley, with the bridge deck being approximately 100 m (328 ft) above the water. It holds the three deepest metro stations in China: Hongyancun (the deepest in the world), Hongtudi, and Liyuchi. Additionally, Hualongqiao, an elevated station where platforms are located 48 meters above ground, is the world's highest, surpassing Smith–Ninth Streets station in New York.

The Chongqing Rail Transit system possesses a number of extremely-long metro-only bridges. The 1,650 m (5,413 ft) long Egongyan Rail Transit Bridge carries the southern arc of the Loop line across the Yangtze River using a 600 m (1,969 ft) long suspension main span, making it the longest metro-only suspension bridge by main span in the world. The Nanjimen Bridge carries Line 10 trains across a 1,225 m (4,019 ft) cable-stayed bridge with a main span of 480 m (1,575 ft), making it the longest metro-only cable-stayed bridge by main span in the world. The Gaojia Huayuan Jialing River Rail Transit Bridge carries the western arc of the Loop line over the Jialing River using a long 594 m (1,949 ft) bridge with a main span of 340 m (1,115 ft). Additionally, Chongqing Rail Transit system has numerous double-deck bridges carrying vehicle and metro traffic, such as the Chaotianmen Bridge, which is the world's longest arch bridge.

== Network ==
Map of Chongqing Rail Transit. (Not to scale)

| Line | | Terminus (District) | | Commencement | Newest extension | Rolling stock (Note: The number refers to the number of the carriages of each train, and the letter followed refers to the type of the carriage. AS and B2 are defined by China, while HL is short for "Hitachi Large" from Japan. Full Load Capacity: Type / AS / B2 / HL; 4 / 1534 / 1240 / 882; 6 / 2322 / 1882 / 1342; 7 / 2716 / - / -; 8 / - / - / 1802) | Length (km) | Stations |
|---|---|---|---|---|---|---|---|---|
| Urban rail transit in China | Loop line | Loop line | | 28 Dec 2018 | 20 Jan 2021 | 6AS | 51 | 33 |
| Urban rail transit in China | Line 1 | Chaotianmen (Yuzhong) | Bishan (Bishan) | 28 Jul 2011 | 31 Dec 2020 | 6B2 | 43.7 | 25 |
| Urban rail transit in China | Line 2 | Jiaochangkou (Yuzhong) | Yudong (Ba'nan) | 6 Nov 2004 | 30 Dec 2014 | 4/6/8HL | 31.4 | 25 |
| Urban rail transit in China | Line 3 | Yudong (Ba'nan) | Terminal 2 of Jiangbei Airport (Liangjiang) | 29 Sep 2011 | 28 Dec 2012 | 6/8HL | 56.1 | 45 |
| Urban rail transit in China | Line 3 – Konggang branch | Bijin (Liangjiang) | Shuangfengqiao (Liangjiang) | 28 Dec 2016 | —N/a | 6HL | 11.0 | 6 |
| Urban rail transit in China | Line 4 | Shimahelijiao (Liangjiang) | Huangling (Liangjiang) | 28 Dec 2018 | 10 Feb 2026 | 6AS | 58 | 32 |
| Urban rail transit in China | Line 5 | Yuegangbeilu (Liangjiang) | Tiaodeng (Dadukou) | 28 Dec 2017 | 30 Nov 2023 | 6AS | 48.66 | 32 |
| Urban rail transit in China | Line 6 | Chayuan (Nan'an) | Beibei (Beibei) | 28 Sep 2012 | 27 Jun 2025 | 6B2 | 70.1 | 31 |
| Urban rail transit in China | Line 6 | Chongqingdong Railway Station (Nan'an) | Liujiaping (Nan'an) | 28 Sep 2012 | 27 Jun 2025 | 6B2 | 70.1 | 31 |
| Urban rail transit in China | Line 6 – International Expo branch | Lijia (Liangjiang) | Shaheba (Liangjiang) | 15 May 2013 | 31 Dec 2020 | 6B2 | 25.8 | 13 |
| Urban rail transit in China | Line 9 | Gaotanyan (Shapingba) | Huashigou (Liangjiang) | 25 Jan 2022 | 18 Jan 2023 | 6AS | 40.1 | 29 |
| Urban rail transit in China | Line 10 | Wangjiazhuang (Liangjiang) | Lanhualu (Nan'an) | 28 Dec 2017 | 30 Nov 2023 | 6AS | 43.3 | 26 |
| Urban rail transit in China | Line 15 | Jingkou (Shapingba) | Liangjiang Movie City (Yubei) | 12 Nov 2026 | —N/a | 6D | 47.9 | 18 |
| Urban rail transit in China | Line 18 | Fuhualu (Yuzhong) | Tiaodengnan (Dadukou) | 28 Dec 2023 | —N/a | 6AS | 28.96 | 19 |
| Urban rail transit in China | Jiangtiao line | Tiaodeng (Dadukou) | Shengquansi (Jiangjin) | 6 Aug 2022 | —N/a | 6AS | 28.2 | 7 |
| Urban rail transit in China | Bitong line | Bishan (Bishan) | Tongliangxi (Tongliang) | 2 Jan 2025 | —N/a | 4D | 37.5 | 8 |
| Total | | | | | | | 621.98 | 342 |

=== Loop line (Line 0) ===
The Loop line (coded as "Line 0") is a rapid transit loop line. The northeastern section was opened on 28 December 2018. The southern section with the Egongyan Rail Transit Bridge opened on 30 December 2019. Three major railway stations in Chongqing are also linked by this line: Chongqing North railway station, Shapingba railway station, and Chongqing West railway station. Loop Line's color is yellow.

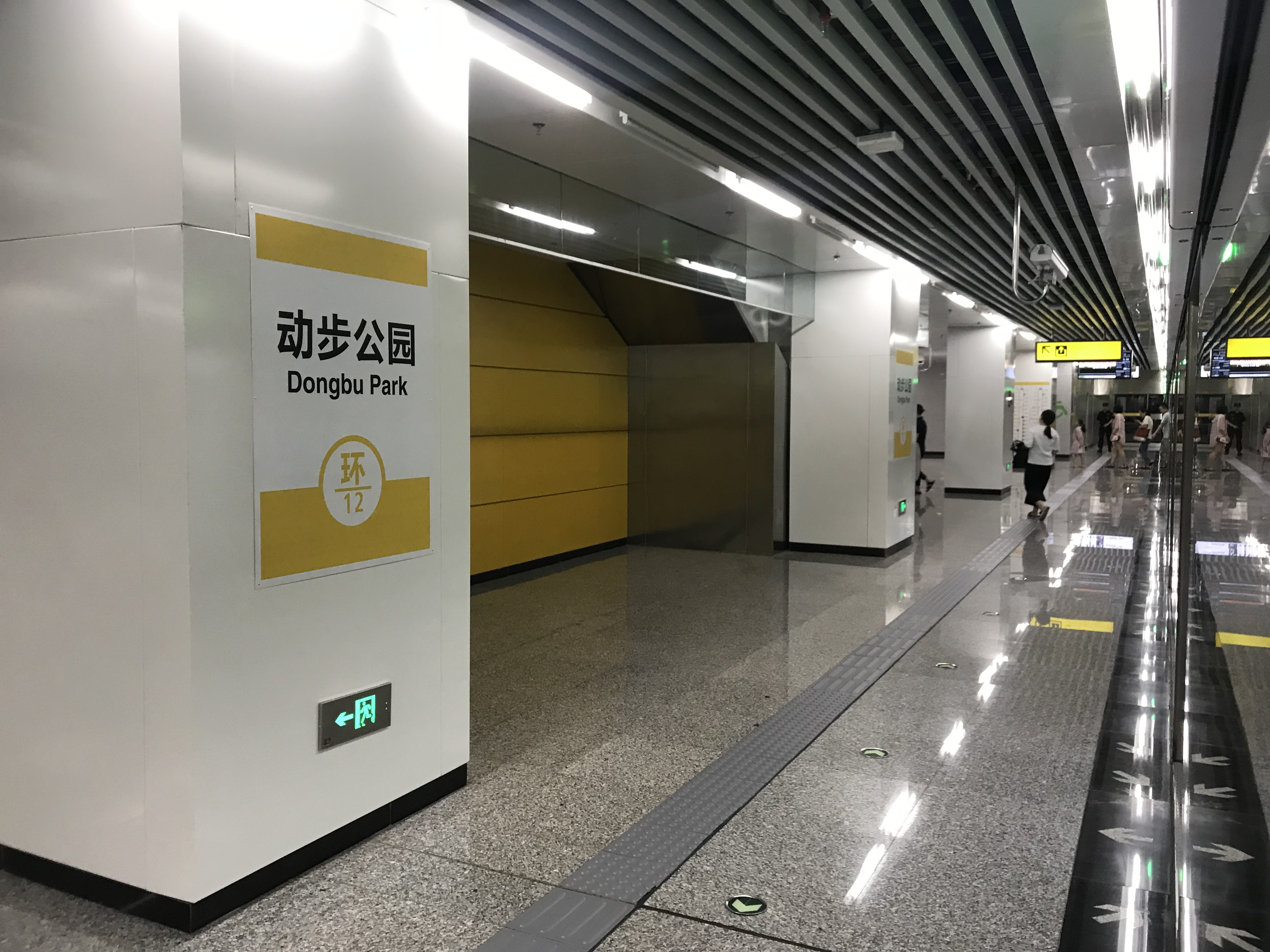
Dongbu Park station of Loop line

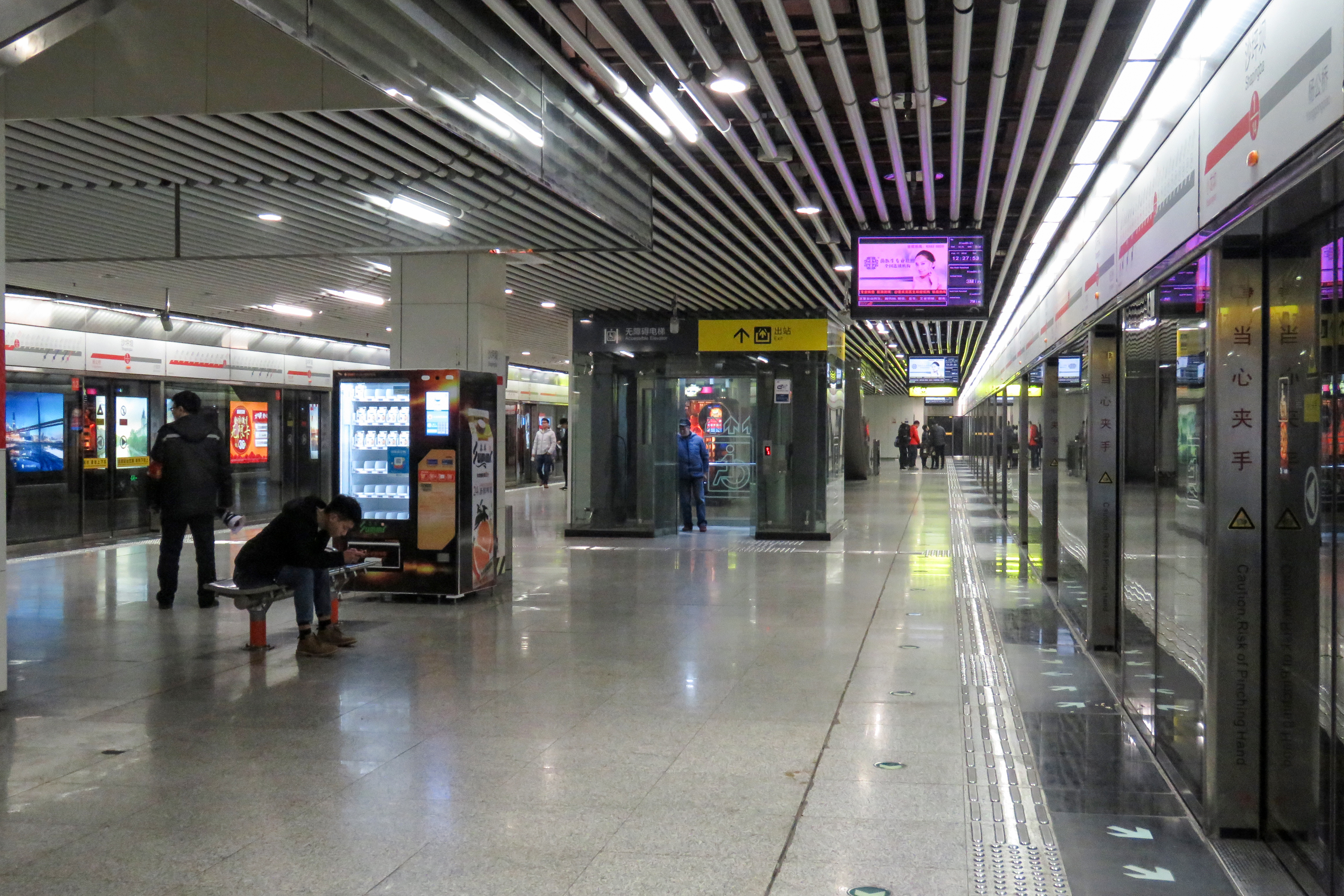
Shapingba station of Line 1

=== Line 1 ===
Line 1 runs 16.4 km (10.2 mi) from Chaotianmen, in the central west, to Shapingba and then to Bishan with a total length of 44.5 km (27.7 mi). It is the first heavy-rail subway line in Chongqing and the second in Western China. The passenger capacity is 36,000 passengers per hour in each way. The line serves as the system's backbone connecting the densest areas including the main Central Business Districts of Jiefangbei, Lianglukou, Daping, and Shapingba. It is the first conventional subway, running in a deep-bored tunnel below Yuzhong and Shapingba Districts.

Line 1 has transfer interchange stations with Line 6 at Xiaoshizi and Line 2 at Jiaochangkou in Jiefangbei CBD and at Daping and Line 3 at Lianglukou, which is near Chongqing railway station in central Yuzhong. Line 1 is also transferable with the Loop Line at Shapingba, although out-of-station transfer is currently needed due to construction setbacks on the interchange channel and concourse connecting the two subway lines.

In 1992, the Chongqing government signed a Build-Operate-Transfer agreement with a Hong Kong company and provided the land for the project, but work ceased in 1997 because of legal issues. Work resumed from Chaotianmen to Shapingba on 9 June 2009, and a limited opening occurred on 28 July 2011. Thales provided an operations control centre for the line. Line 1's color is red.

=== Line 2 ===
A train going out from Liziba Station, Line 2

Line 2, a monorail line, runs 31.4 km (19.5 mi) and has 25 stations. It begins as a subway under downtown Jiefangbei, then runs west along the southern bank of Jialing River on an elevated line, and then turns south into the southwestern inner suburbs, looping back east, to terminate at Yudong, in Ba'nan District. It runs mostly elevated, but a 2.2 km (1.4 mi) section is underground, including three of its 18 stations in the Jiefangbei CBD and central Daping areas in the extremely-dense area of Yuzhong District. Line 2 runs through four administrative districts in the central city (Yuzhong, Jiulongpo, Dadukou, and Ba'nan). In 2010, Line 2 served 45 million passengers. It also runs through Daping CBD, Yangjiaping CBD in Jiulongpo District, and Chongqing Zoo at. Most trains have four cars, and six-car trains began to operate in September 2012. Line 2 is the first rapid transit line to open in the Interior West of China, in 2005. In 2013, six-car trains are being implemented because of overcrowding and increasing demand. Line 2's color is green.

Liziba station on Line 2 has become a tourist attraction for its distinctive design, with trains running through the sixth to eighth floors of a residential building.

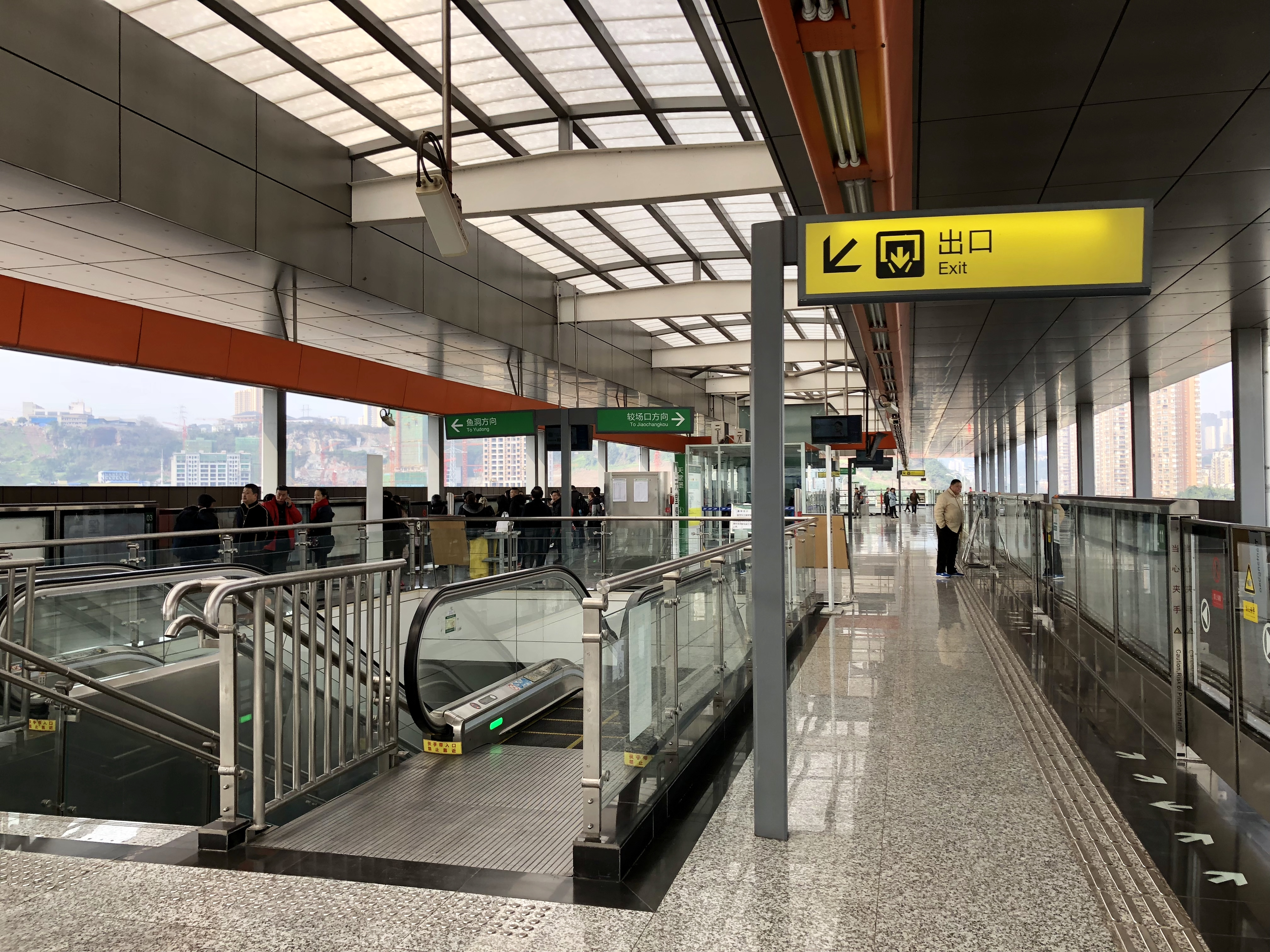
Tiantangbao station of Line 2

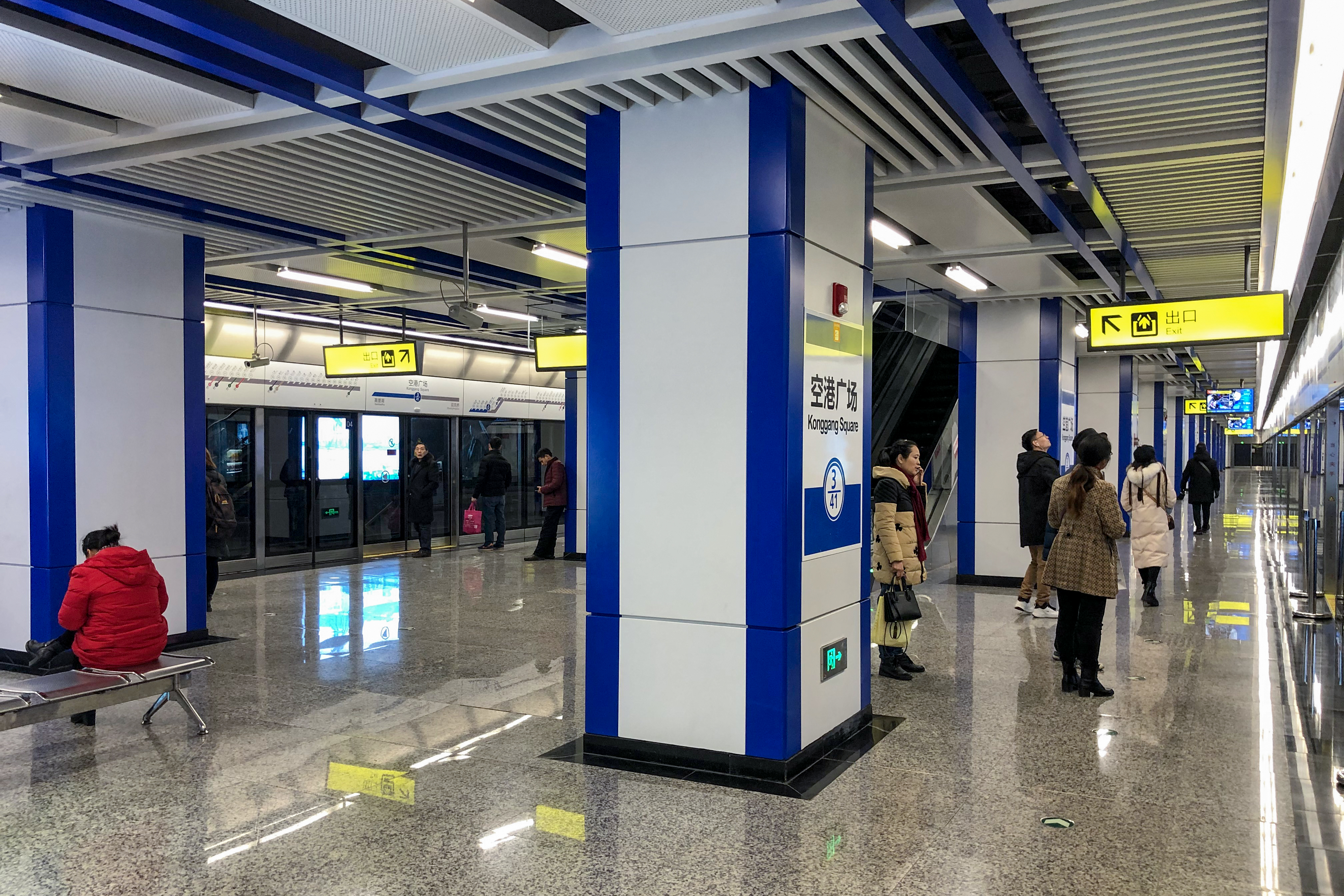
Konggang Square station of Line 3

=== Line 3 ===
Line 3 is the longest and busiest monorail in the world. It runs from north to south and links the districts separated by the Yangtze (Chang Jiang) and the Jialing Rivers. The initial segment, from Lianglukou to Yuanyang (18 stations, 17.5 km (10.9 mi)), opened on 29 September 2011, with a northern extension, from Yuanyang to Jiangbei Airport, opening on 30 December 2011. A southern extension, from Ertang to Yudong, opened on 28 December 2012.

Most trains have six cars, more than on the older Line 2. The line started to equip eight-car trains in 2014, which are now in operation. There are interchange stations in the Yuzhong district with Line 1, at Lianglukou (Caiyuanba Intercity Railway/Coach Station), and with Line 2, at Niujiaotuo. Line 3's color is indigo.

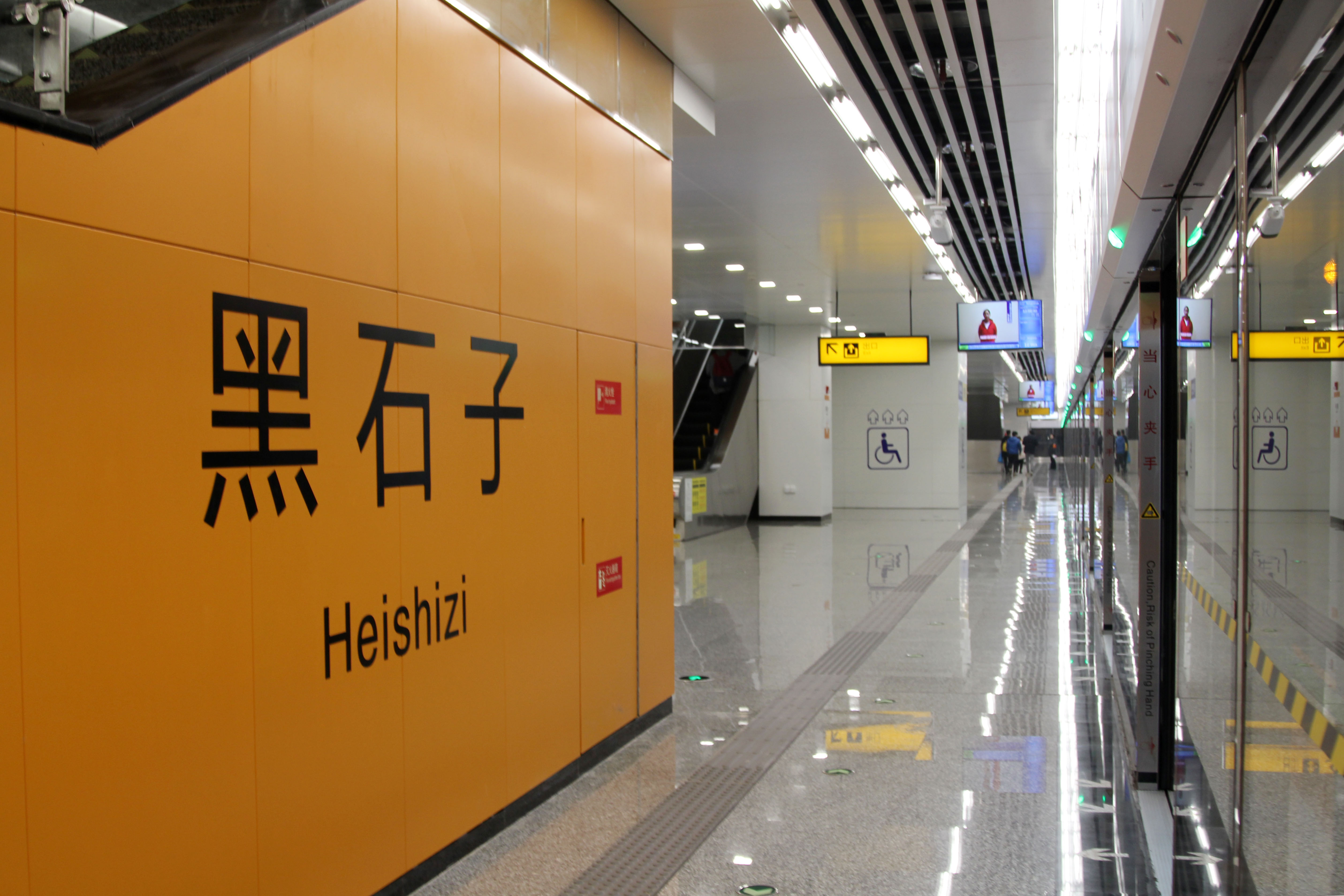
Heishizi station of Line 4

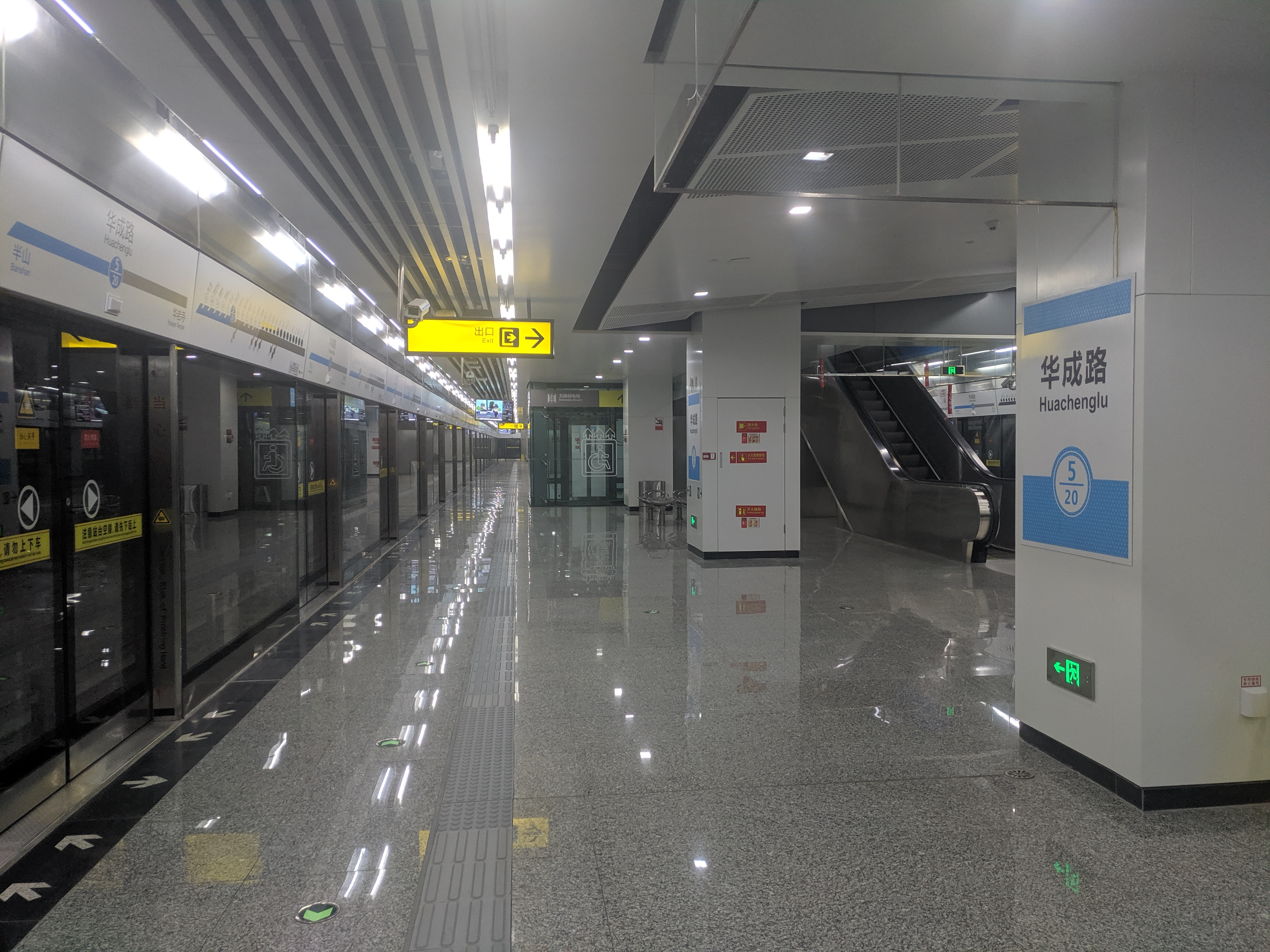
Huachenglu station of Line 5

=== Line 4 ===
Line 4 is a rapid transit line. In June 2018, debugging of the first segment of Phase I commenced. The line began operating on 28 December that year. Line 4's color is orange. The Western extension from Shimahelijiao to Jiazhoulu opened on 10 February 2026 at 2:00 pm (Shimahelijiao to Shunshuisi Park not opened).

=== Line 5 ===
Line 5 is a northeast–southwest heavy-rail line crossing the centre, and the line has opened its northern and southern sections of phase 1 and northern extension. It will connect Yubei, Jiangbei, Yuzhong, Jiulongpo, Shapingba and Dadukou districts. New six-car trains were introduced on the line. Line 5's color is light blue.

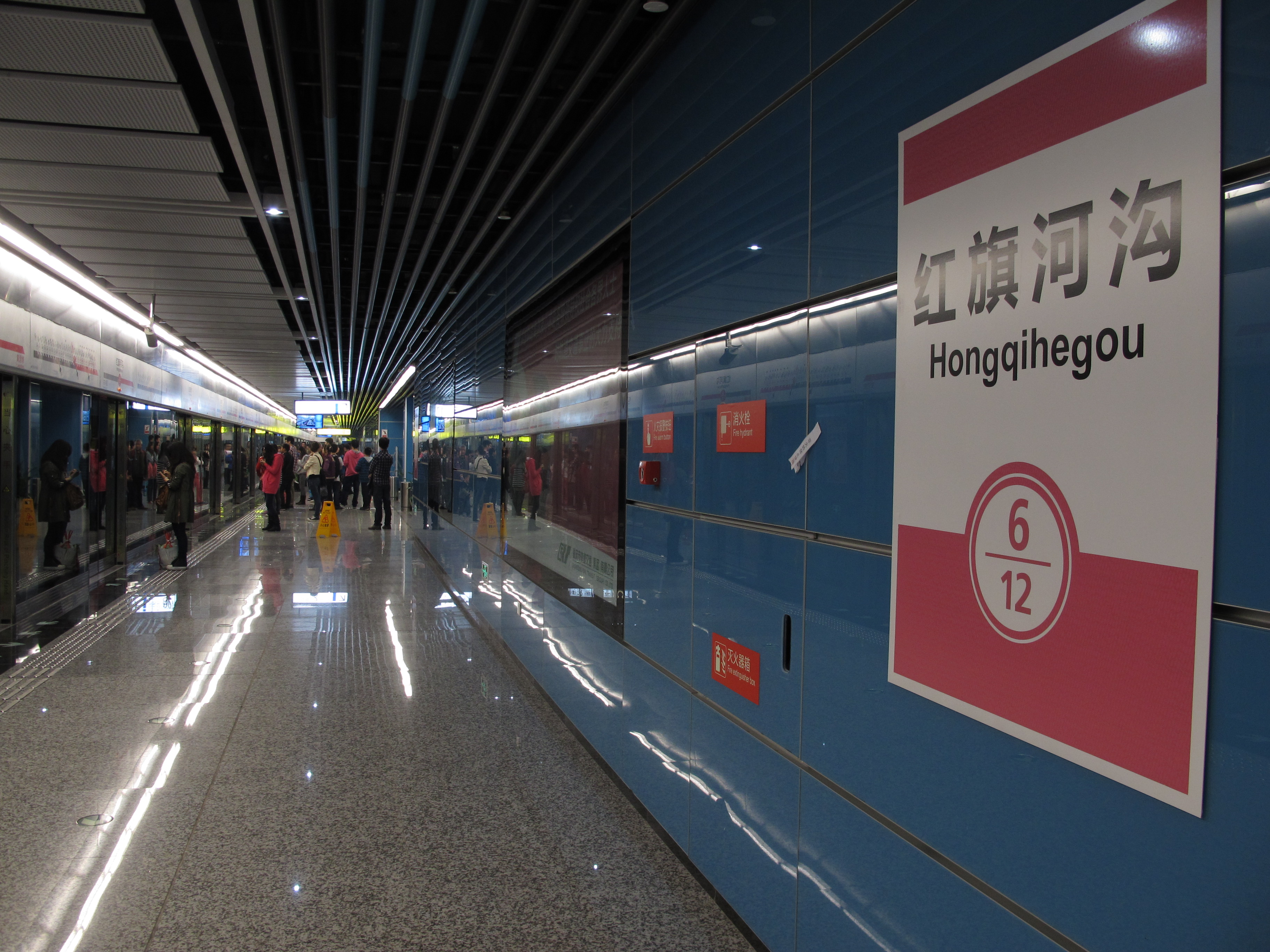
Hongqihegou station of Line 6

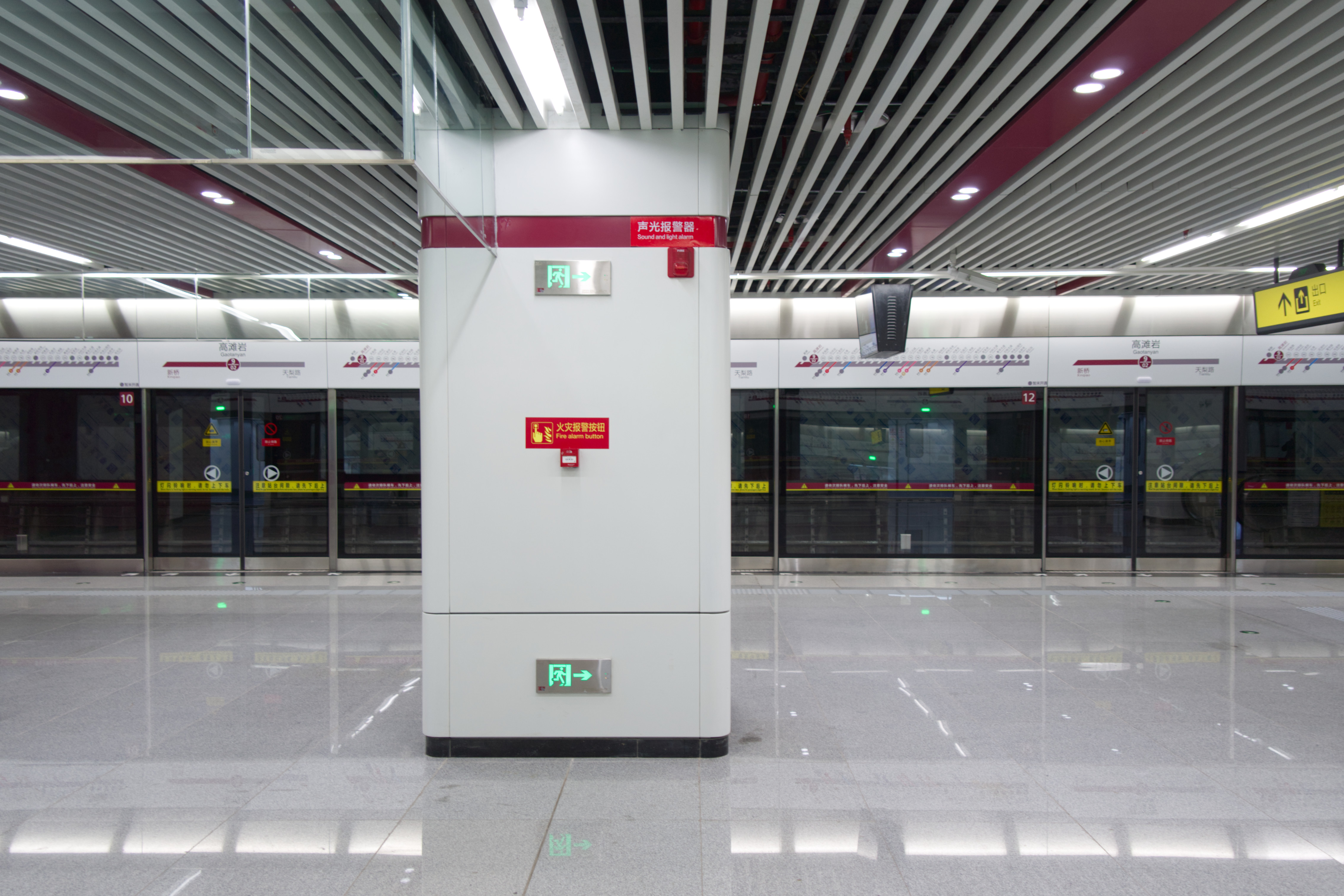
Gaotanyan station of Line 9

=== Line 6 ===
Line 6 is the second heavy-rail subway line of Chongqing. Opened on 28 September 2012, it connects Nan'an, Yuzhong, Jiangbei and Yubei districts in central Chongqing. The line features the Caijia Rail Transit Bridge, the highest metro-only brige in the world, on which it crosses the Jialing River.

A 5 station, 26.2 km (16.3 mi) long northern branch from Lijia to Beibei, in the district of the same name, was opened on 31 December 2013. The line was extended to Chayuan in 2014. A 13.9 km (8.6 mi) branch to Shaheba, known as the International Expo branch, was opened in 2020. Thales provided an operations control centre for the line. Line 6's color is pink.

=== Line 9 ===
The first phase of Line 9 opened on 25 January 2022. It connects Huashigou in Yubei District to Gaotanyan in Shapingba District. The line's route also serves Yuzhong District and Jiangbei District. Line 9 crosses the Jialing River on a bridge parallel to Jiahua Bridge. It also features the deepest metro station in the world, Hongyancun station, at 116 meters deep. Line 9's colour is crimson.

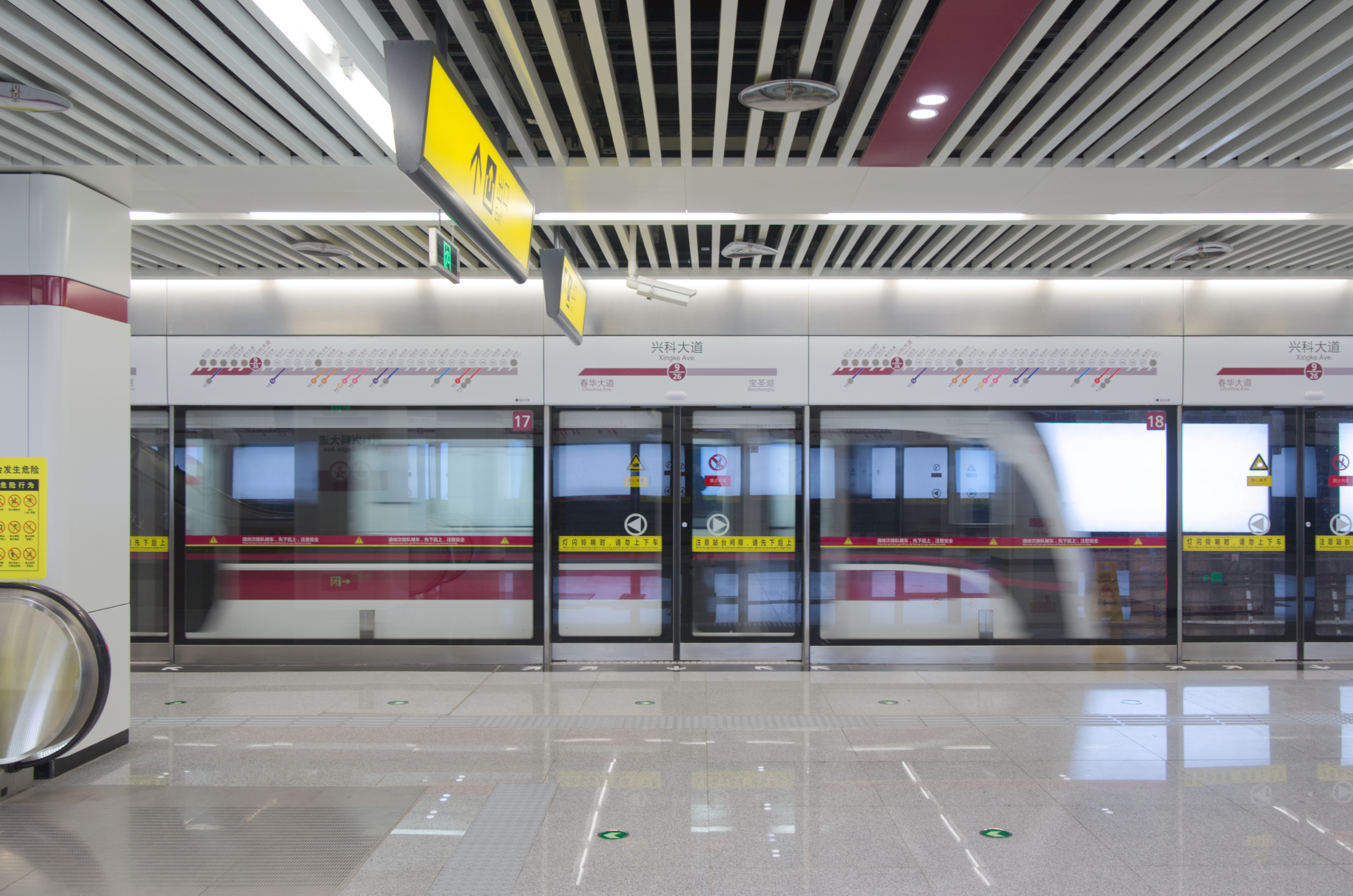
Xingke Ave. station of Line 9

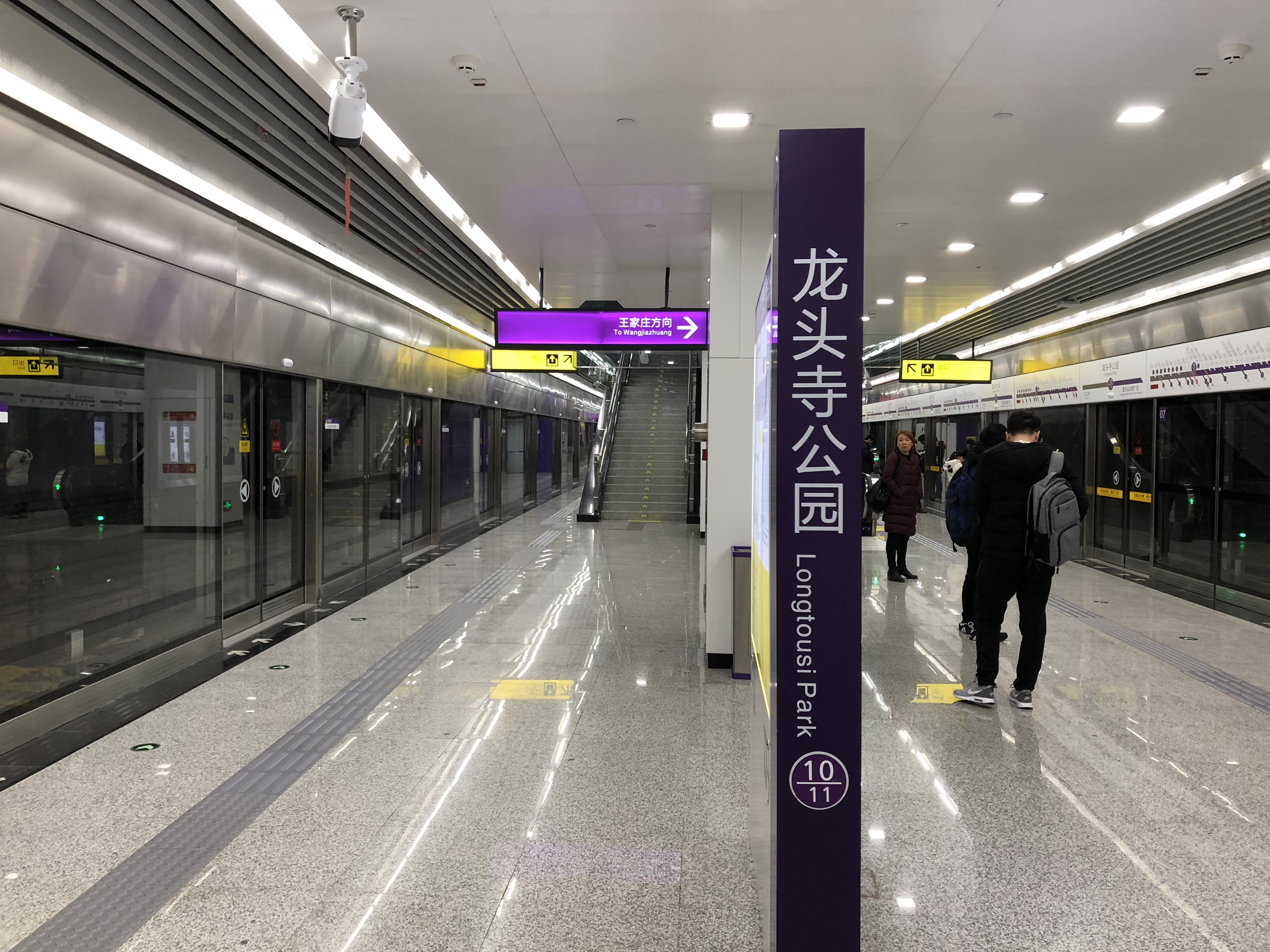
Longtousi Park station of Line 10

=== Line 10 ===
The line serves the North Railway station and the airport terminals. The first phase (Liyuchi to Wangjiazhuang) opened on 28 December 2017, and the second phase will connect Yuzhong and Nan'an districts by crossing the Jialing and the Yangtze rivers. Two new bridges, Zengjiayan Jialing River Bridge and Nanjimen Rail Transit Bridge, are under construction for train services to the south. Line 10's color is purple.

=== Line 18 ===
Opened in 2023, Line 18 connects Tiaodeng in Dadukou District to Fuhualu in Yuzhong District. The line crosses the Yangtze river on a 660-meter span cable-stayed bridge. The line's second phase, currently under construction, is projected to cross Yuzhong District and terminate at Xiaoshizi. Line 18's color is turquoise.

=== Jiangtiao line ===
The Jiangtiao line is a suburban rapid transit line connecting Jiangjin District with the metropolitan area at Tiaodeng. There is through service between Line 5 and the Jiangtiao line since 2023. Jiangtiao line's color is blue.

=== Bitong line ===
The Bitong line is a suburban rapid transit line connecting Tongliang District with the metropolitan area at Bishan. There will be through service between Line 27 and the Bitong line in the future.

== Ticketing ==
=== Transport cards ===
CRT accepts Life & Transport Card (Chongqing Universal Card, released by Chongqing City Card Payment Co., Ltd.) and its compatible cards, released by partner companies in other cities of China. There is a 10% discount applied to the Regular Card if it is used on public transit in the city. The higher price is paid for transfers between the bus and the metro within 1 hour (not including metro-to-metro, according to the paying time). The Regular Card can be purchased at any CRT station, and a deposit can be recovered when the card is returned with its receipt. In addition the card can be used in many shops, cinemas, restaurants, etc. in Chongqing. The Students' Card and the Elders' Card can not be directly used on the metro since their monthly fee covers only buses unless a cash sub-account, which allows a 50% discount, is added to the cards for free at the service points.

=== Time limit ===
All trips must be completed in 3 hours upon entering the fare-paid area, or the highest ticket price in the system will be charged in addition.

== Operation ==
During times of heavy use like for major events, CRT may close some stations to avoid overcrowding. In 2018, CRT closed Xiaoshizi, Jiaochangkou, Qixinggang, Lianglukou, Xiaolongkan, and Shapingba stations of Line 1; Jiaochangkou and Linjiangmen stations of Line 2; Lianglukou, Huaxinjie, Guanyinqiao, and Hongqihegou stations of Line 3; Shangxinjie, Xiaoshizi, Grand Theater, Jiangbeicheng, and Hongqihegou stations of Line 6 after 20:00 on Christmas Eve and Christmas Day, and after 19:00 on New Year's Eve. And they also closed Shapingba and Shangxinjie stations of Loop line after 19:00 on New Year's Eve.

From 9 to 12 November 2018, they closed Grand Theater and Jiangbeicheng stations from 10:00 to 15:00 because of heavy use during Flower Expo; from 1 to 7 November 2019, they closed Grand Theater and Jiangbeicheng stations since 10:00 till 16:00 because of heavy use during Flower Expo.

=== Accessibility ===
Almost every station has accessible elevators and toilets, and almost every train has wheelchair locks. Only the oldest rolling stock and toilets of Line 2 are not fully accessible. In addition, many older interchange channels between lines are not designed with accessibility in mind, which means the disabled there must transfer via the main concourse.

=== Luggage rack ===
The trains on Line 10, which links Jiangbei Airport and Chongqing North railway station, are equipped with a luggage rack on each car.

== History ==
The CRT is part of the central government's project to develop the Western regions. The Japan Bank for International Cooperation provided some of the funding. Construction was carried out, with co-operation between Changchun Railway Vehicles Co. Ltd. and Hitachi Monorail, which used advanced Japanese monorail technology. Construction on Line 2 began in 1999, and the line was officially opened in June 2005 from Jiaochangkou (Jiefangbei CBD) to Zoo (Chongqing Zoo).

=== Early concepts and attempts ===
- The 1946 proposal by the Nationalist government is a high-speed tram system. The rail weighs 47.77 kg/m (96.3 lb/yd), with a rail gauge of 1,000 mm (3 ft 3 3/8 in), a maximum slope of 9%, a minimum radius of curvature of 80 m (262 ft). The top speed is 25 km/h (16 mph) in the urban area and 45 km/h (28 mph) in the suburban area. The train was 8 m (26 ft) long, 1.8 m (5 ft 11 in) wide, with two 35-horsepower motors and a trailer. Each train took 240 passengers. The headway was designed to be 10 minutes. The system was expected to carry 1 million passengers per day. Some of the tracks were underground.
  - Line A, Longmenhao – Ciqikou, 9 stations, 14.75 km (9.17 mi)
  - Line B, Longmenhao – Nanwenquan, 7 stations, 19.49 km (12.11 mi)
  - Line C, Longmenhao – Datiankan, 3 stations, 6.9 km (4.3 mi)
- The 1958 attempt by "Yuzhong District Subway Engineering Unit" was started in late 1958, only to be suspended one year later.
- The 1960 proposal features a 100 km-long (62 mi) underground rapid rail transit system, linking the city center with Xinpaifang, Xiaolongkan, Yangjiaping, Shiqiaopu, Lianglukou, and other populated areas, was planned.
- The 1965 attempt was made by the reinstated engineering unit. It has 4 units, including more than 1000 workers in total. Construction was stopped again in late 1966 by the Cultural Revolution. The unit was officially disbanded again in 1971. The completed tunnel sections were taken over by the civil air defense authorities.
- The 1983 proposal was a 12.2 km-long (7.6 mi) subway line (Chaotianmen – Yangjiaping). It is the precursor to today's Line 2.
- The 1988 attempt was made by a metro company in Lianglukou established by several Hong Kong businessmen. The tunnel from previous attempts were extended.
- The 1991 proposal illustrated a 4-line 55 km-long (34 mi) monorail system.

=== Official long-term plans ===
- The 1998 plan has 5 lines in total, with a length of about 119 km (74 mi).
- The 2003 and 2007 plans are two similar expansions including 10 lines, with a total length of about 522 km (324 mi). Line 4 in the previous blueprint received a huge update and was renamed to Loop line, according to its new shape.
- The 2011 plan features 8 new lines, with a total length of about 820 km (510 mi).
- The 2019 plan targets a 30-line network as of 2050, with a length of about 1,473 km (915 mi).

=== Commencement and expansions ===
Timelapse of the Chongqing Rail Transit.

| Line | Segment | | Start of construction | Began operation |
|---|---|---|---|---|
Phase I (2000‒2013)
| Line 1 | Chaotianmen | Xiaoshizi | 18 Jun 2007 | 31 Dec 2020 |
| Line 1 | Xiaoshizi | Jiaochangkou | 18 Jun 2007 | 28 Jul 2011 |
| Line 1 | Jiaochangkou | Shapingba | 18 Jun 2007 | 27 Sep 2011 |
| Line 1 | Shapingba | Daxuecheng | 18 Jun 2007 | 20 Dec 2012 |
| Line 1 | Daxuecheng | Jiandingpo | 20 Sep 2012 | 30 Dec 2014 |
| Line 2 | Jiaochangkou | Daping | 26 Dec 1999 | 11 Dec 2004 |
| Line 2 | Daping | Zoo | 26 Dec 1999 | 06 Nov 2004 |
| Line 2 | Zoo | Xinshancun | 26 Dec 1999 | 01 Jul 2006 |
| Line 2 | Xinshancun | Yudong | 31 Jul 2008 | 30 Dec 2014 |
| Line 3 | Yudong | Chongqing Jiaotong University | 2010 | 28 Dec 2012 |
| Line 3 | Chongqing Jiaotong University | Lianglukou | 06 Apr 2007 | 30 Dec 2011 |
| Line 3 | Lianglukou | Longtousi | 06 Apr 2007 | 29 Sep 2011 |
| Line 3 | Longtousi | Yuanyang | Dec 2008 | 29 Sep 2011 |
| Line 3 | Yuanyang | Changfulu | Dec 2008 | 08 Oct 2011 |
| Line 3 | Changfulu | Terminal 2 of Jiangbei Airport | Dec 2008 | 30 Dec 2011 |
| Line 3 | Bijin | Jurenba | Jan 2013 | 28 Dec 2016 |
| Line 6 | Chayuan | Wulidian | 2009 | 30 Dec 2014 |
| Line 6 | Wulidian | Kangzhuang | 2009 | 28 Sep 2012 |
| Line 6 | Kangzhuang | Lijia | 2009 | 26 Dec 2012 |
| Line 6 | Lijia | Beibei | 2009 | 31 Dec 2013 |
Phase II (2012‒2020)
| Loop line | Chongqing Library | Haixialu | 28 Oct 2013 | 28 Dec 2018 |
| Loop line | Haixialu | Erlang | 28 Oct 2013 | 30 Dec 2019 |
| Loop line | Erlang | Chongqing Library | 28 Oct 2013 | 20 Jan 2021 |
| Line 4 | Min'an Ave | Chongqing North Station North Square | 03 Dec 2013 | 11 Jan 2019 |
| Line 4 | Chongqing North Station North Square | Tangjiatuo | 03 Dec 2013 | 28 Dec 2018 |
| Line 5 | The EXPO Garden Center | Dalongshan | 03 Dec 2013 | 28 Dec 2017 |
| Line 5 | Dalongshan | Dashiba | 03 Dec 2013 | 24 Dec 2018 |
| Line 5 | Dashiba | Shiqiaopu | 03 Dec 2013 | 30 Nov 2023 |
| Line 5 | Shiqiaopu | Tiaodeng | 03 Dec 2013 | 20 Jan 2021 |
| Line 6 | Lijia | Yuelai | 2009 | 15 May 2013 |
| Line 6 | Yuelai | Shaheba | 28 Oct 2016 | 31 Dec 2020 |
| Line 9 | Xinqiao | Gaotanyan | Sep 2016 | TBA |
| Line 9 | Gaotanyan | Xingke Ave. | Sep 2016 | 25 Jan 2022 |
| Line 9 | Xingke Ave. | Huashigou | 2018 | 18 Jan 2023 |
| Line 10 | Lanhualu | Houbao | 28 Oct 2016 | 30 Nov 2023 |
| Line 10 | Houbao | Liyuchi | 28 Oct 2016 | 18 Jan 2023 |
| Line 10 | Liyuchi | Wangjiazhuang | May 2014 | 28 Dec 2017 |
Phase III (2018‒2023)
| Line 4 | Tangjiatuo | Huangling | 25 Jan 2019 | 18 Jun 2022 |
| Line 5 | Yuegangbeilu | The EXPO Garden Center | 25 Jan 2019 | 27 Feb 2023 |
| Line 18 | Fuhualu | Tiaodengnan | 25 Jan 2019 | 28 Dec 2023 |
Phase IV (2020‒2025)
| Line 4 | Shimahelijiao | Jiazhoulu | 02 Mar 2021 | 10 Feb 2026 |
| Line 6 | Chongqng East | Liujiaping | Mar 2023 | 27 Jun 2025 |
| Line 15 | Jingkou | Liangjiang Movie City | 02 Mar 2021 | 12 Nov 2026 |
Others
| Bitong line | Bishan | Tongliangxi | 29 Nov 2019 | 02 Jan 2025 |

=== Incidents ===
At around 14:00 of 8 January 2019, an improperly secured air defense lock was struck by an in service Loop line train, derailing it and causing serious damage to the cabcar. The accident injured three employees and one passenger. One of the employees, the driver, later died from their injuries shortly after being sent to the hospital.

== Technology ==
Chongqing Rail Transit is the first metro system in the world building the first CBTC interconnection signal system.

| Line | Rolling stock | | | Signal system | | Notes |
| Line | Manufacturer | Trains | | Manufacturer | CBTC | Notes |
|---|---|---|---|---|---|---|
| Loop line | CRRC Changchun Railway Vehicles | 6AS | 66 | Traffic Control Technology | Yes | |
| Line 1 | CRRC Changchun Railway Vehicles | 6B | 53 | Siemens | Yes | |
| Line 2 | Hitachi | 4HL | 2 | The Nippon Signal | No | |
| Line 2 | CRRC Changchun Railway Vehicles | 4HL | 25 | The Nippon Signal | No | |
| Line 2 | CRRC Changchun Railway Vehicles | 6HL | 22 | The Nippon Signal | No | |
| Line 2 | CRRC Changchun Railway Vehicles | 8HL | 12 | The Nippon Signal | Yes | |
| Line 3 | CRRC Changchun Railway Vehicles | 6HL | 54 | Hitachi | Yes | |
| Line 3 | CRRC Changchun Railway Vehicles | 8HL | 30 | Hitachi | Yes | |
| Line 4 | CRRC Changchun Railway Vehicles | 6AS | 49 | United Mechanical & Electrical | Yes | |
| Line 5 | CRRC Qingdao Sifang Locomotive & Rolling Stock | 6AS | 39 | China Railway Signal & Communication | Yes | |
| Line 5 | CRRC Changchun Railway Vehicles | 6AS | 15 (Note: Additions for the northern extension, but currently not completely manufactured) | China Railway Signal & Communication | Yes | |
| Line 6 | CRRC Changchun Railway Vehicles | 6B | 57 | Siemens | Yes | |
| Line 6 | CRRC Changchun Railway Vehicles | 6B | 12 | China Railway Signal & Communication | Yes | |
| Line 9 | CRRC Changchun Railway Vehicles | 6AS | 38 | China Academy of Railway Sciences | Yes | |
| Line 10 | CRRC Changchun Railway Vehicles | 6AS | 26 | China Academy of Railway Sciences | Yes | |
| Line 18 | CRRC Changchun Railway Vehicles | 6AS | TBA | United Mechanical & Electrical | Yes | |
| Jiangtiao line | CRRC Changchun Railway Vehicles | 6AS | 15 | China Railway Signal & Communication | Yes | |

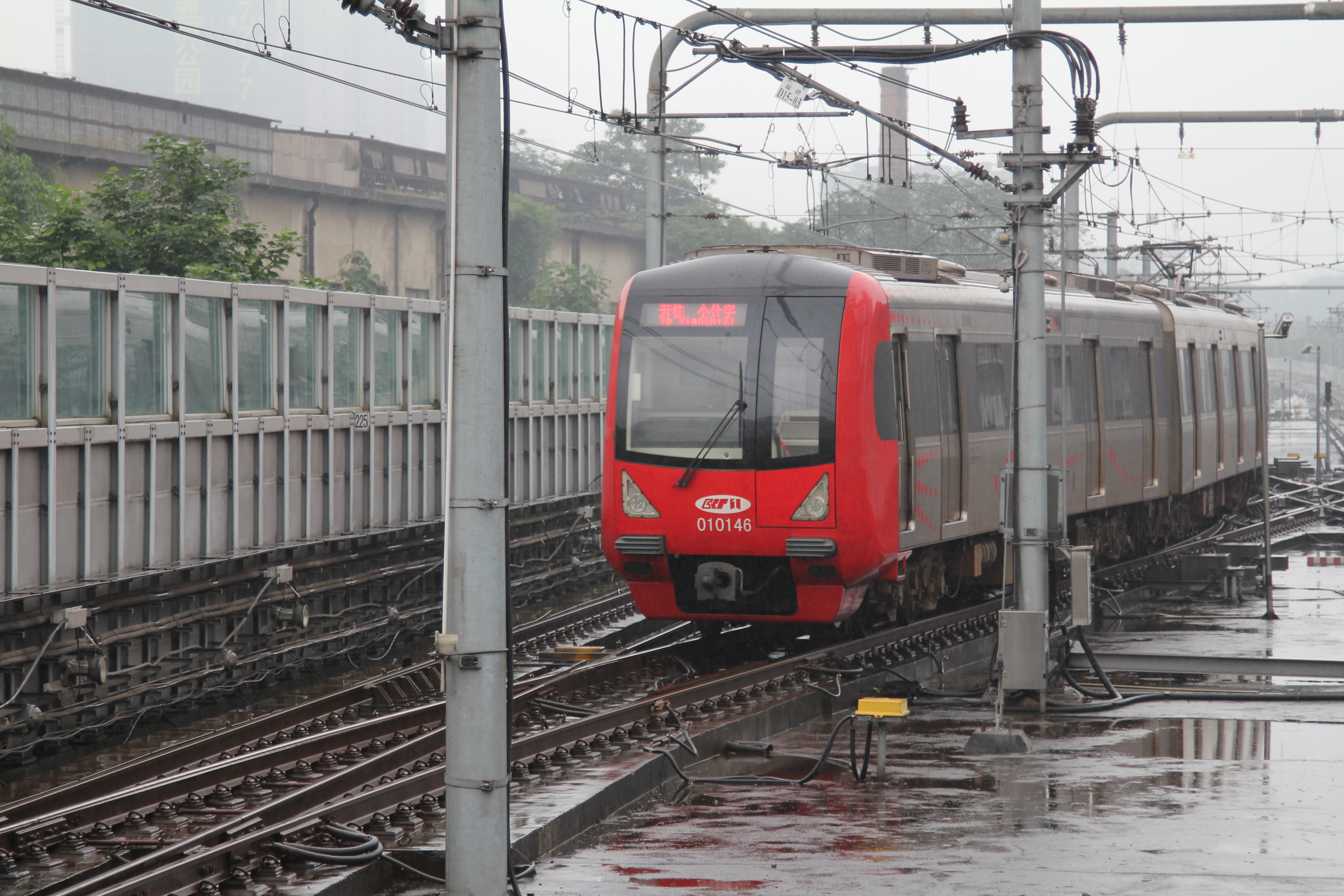
Line 1

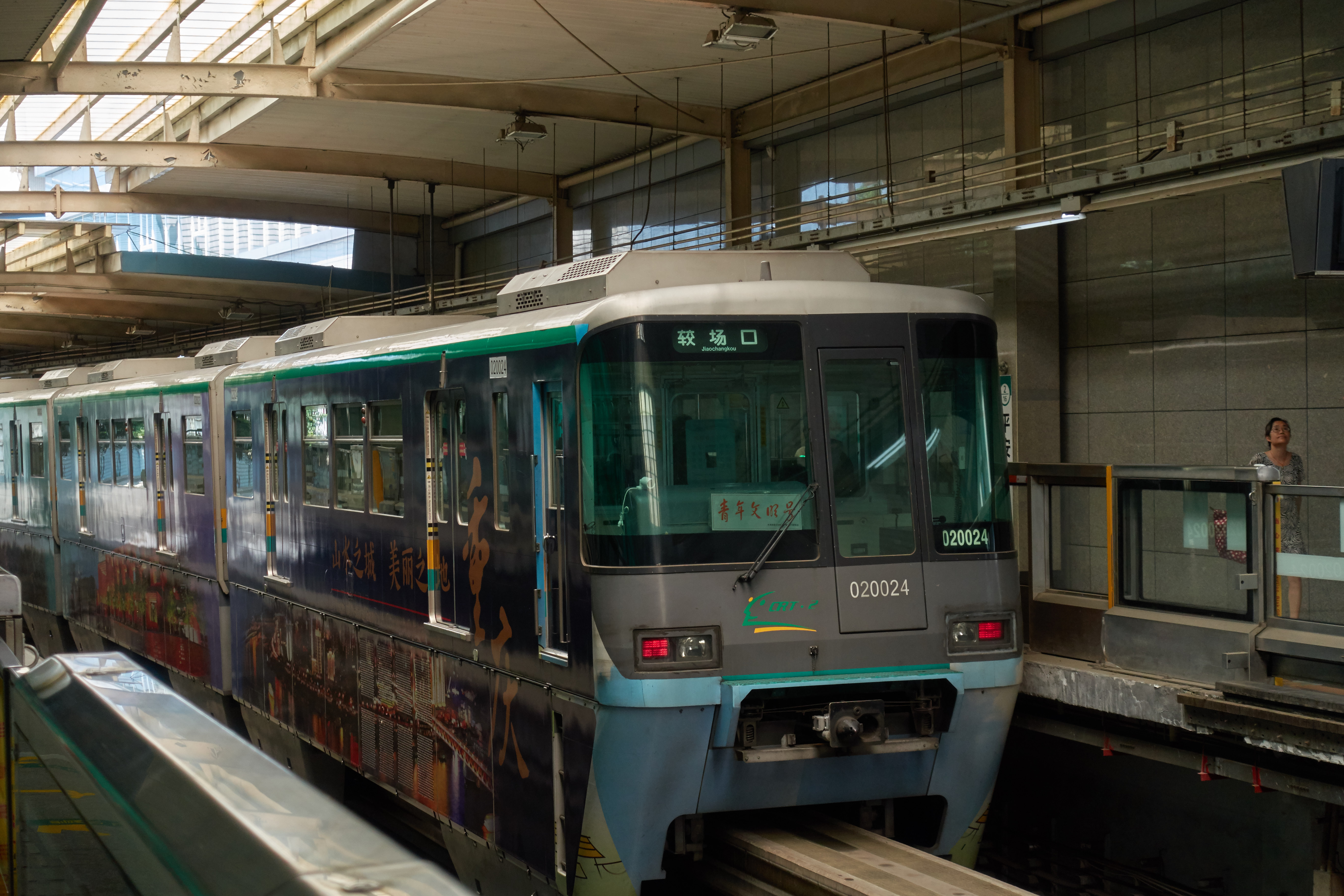
Line 2 (built by Hitachi)

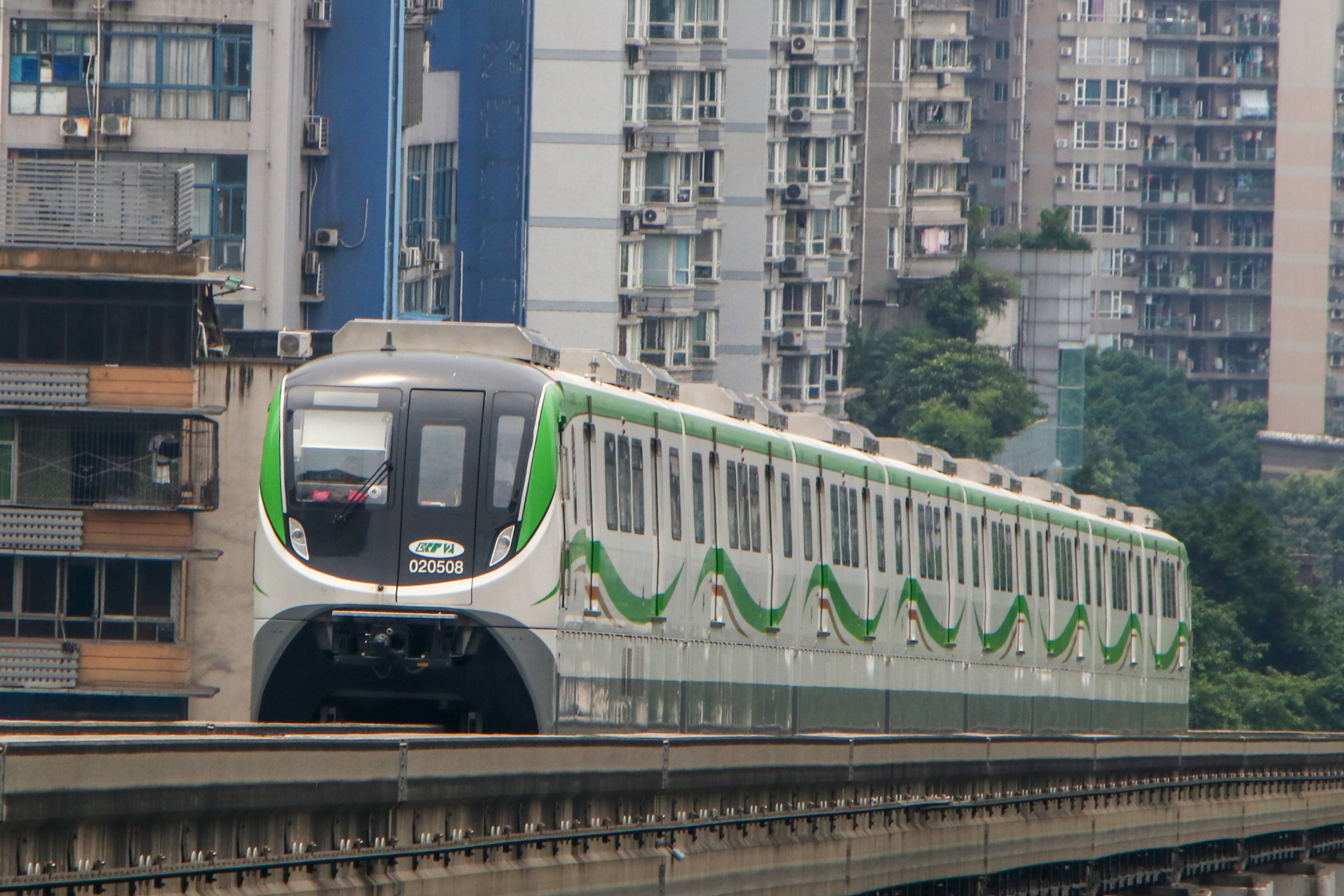
Line 2 (built by Changchun Railway Vehicles)

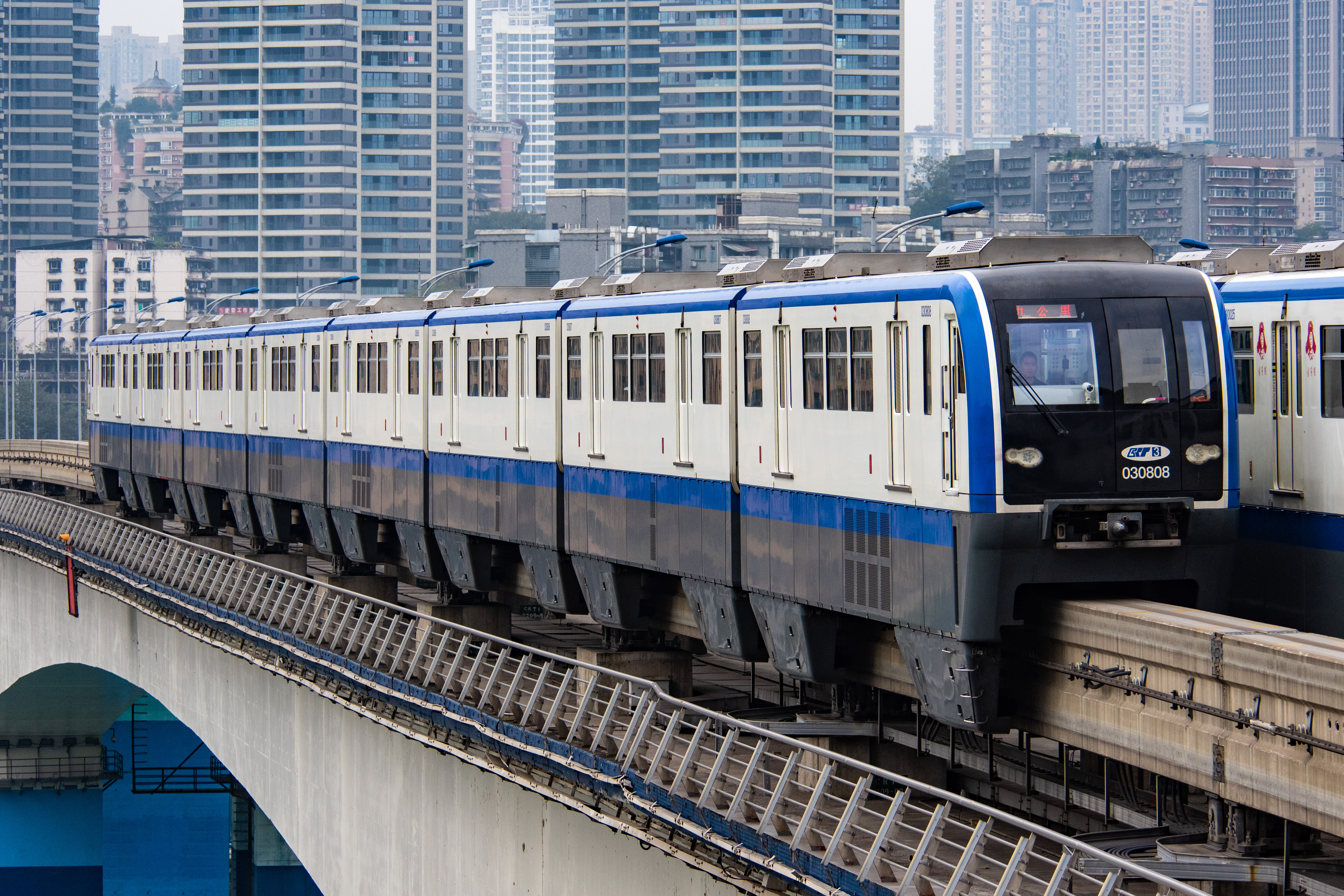
Line 3

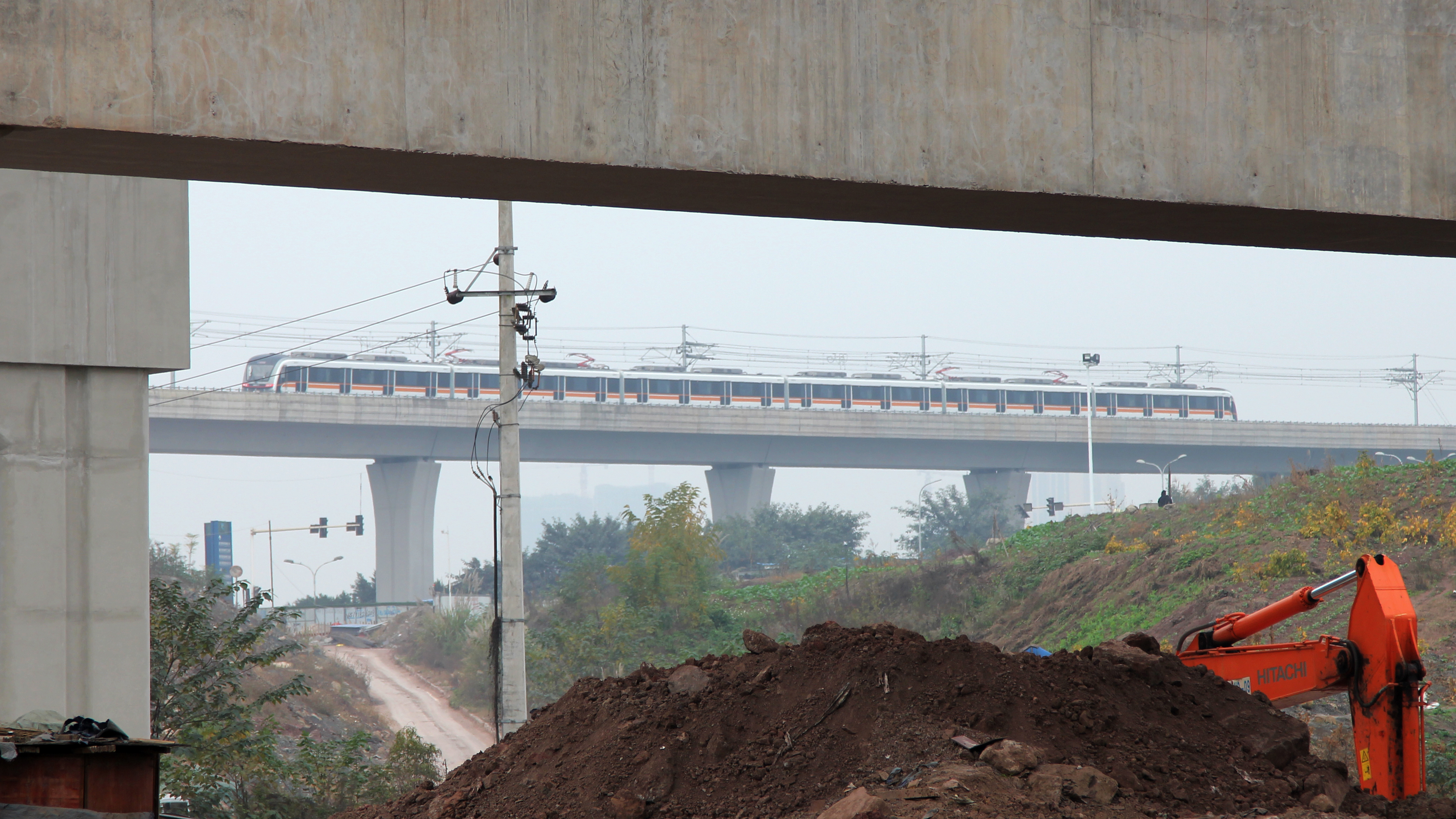
Line 4

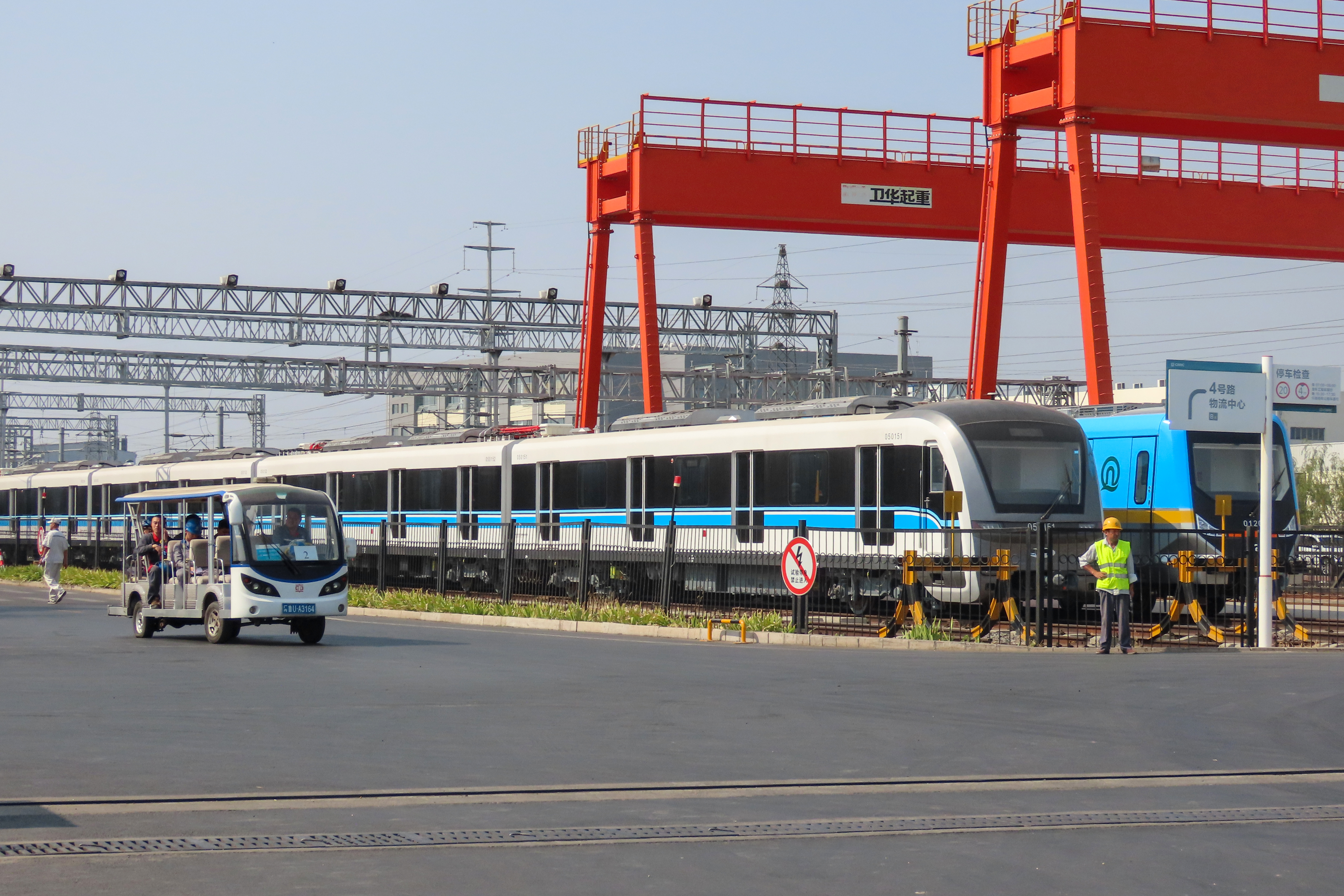
Line 5

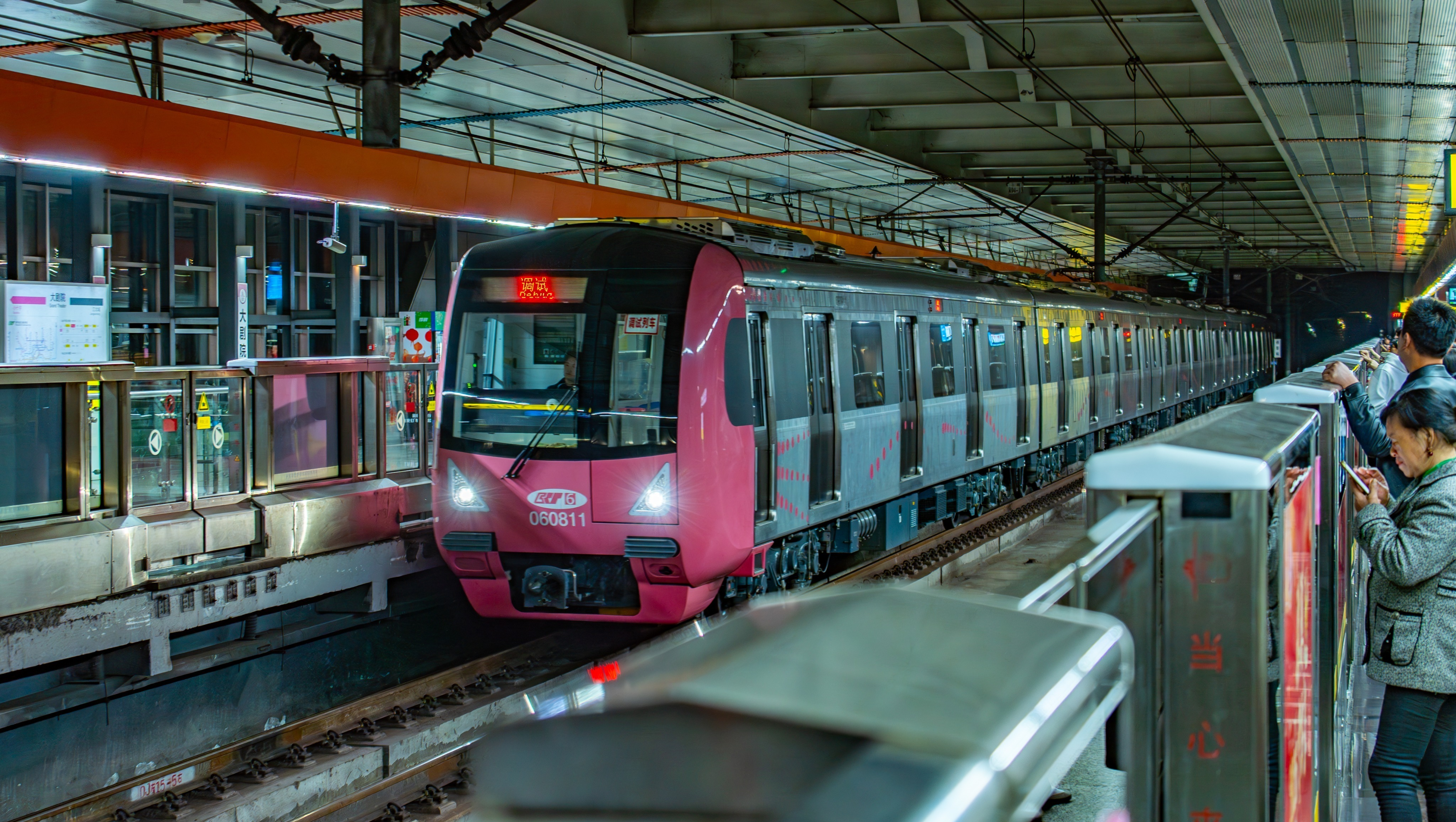
Line 6

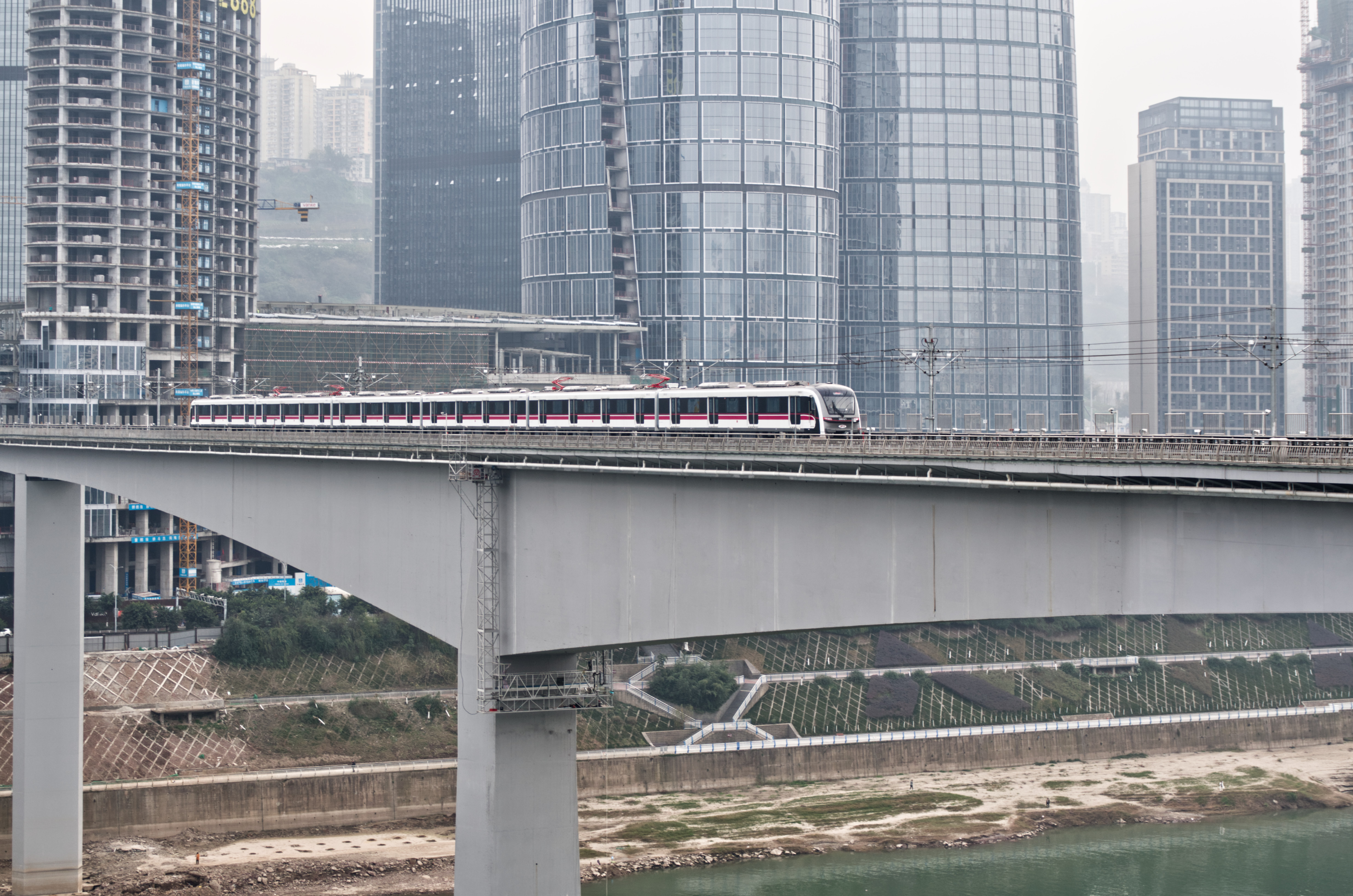
Line 9

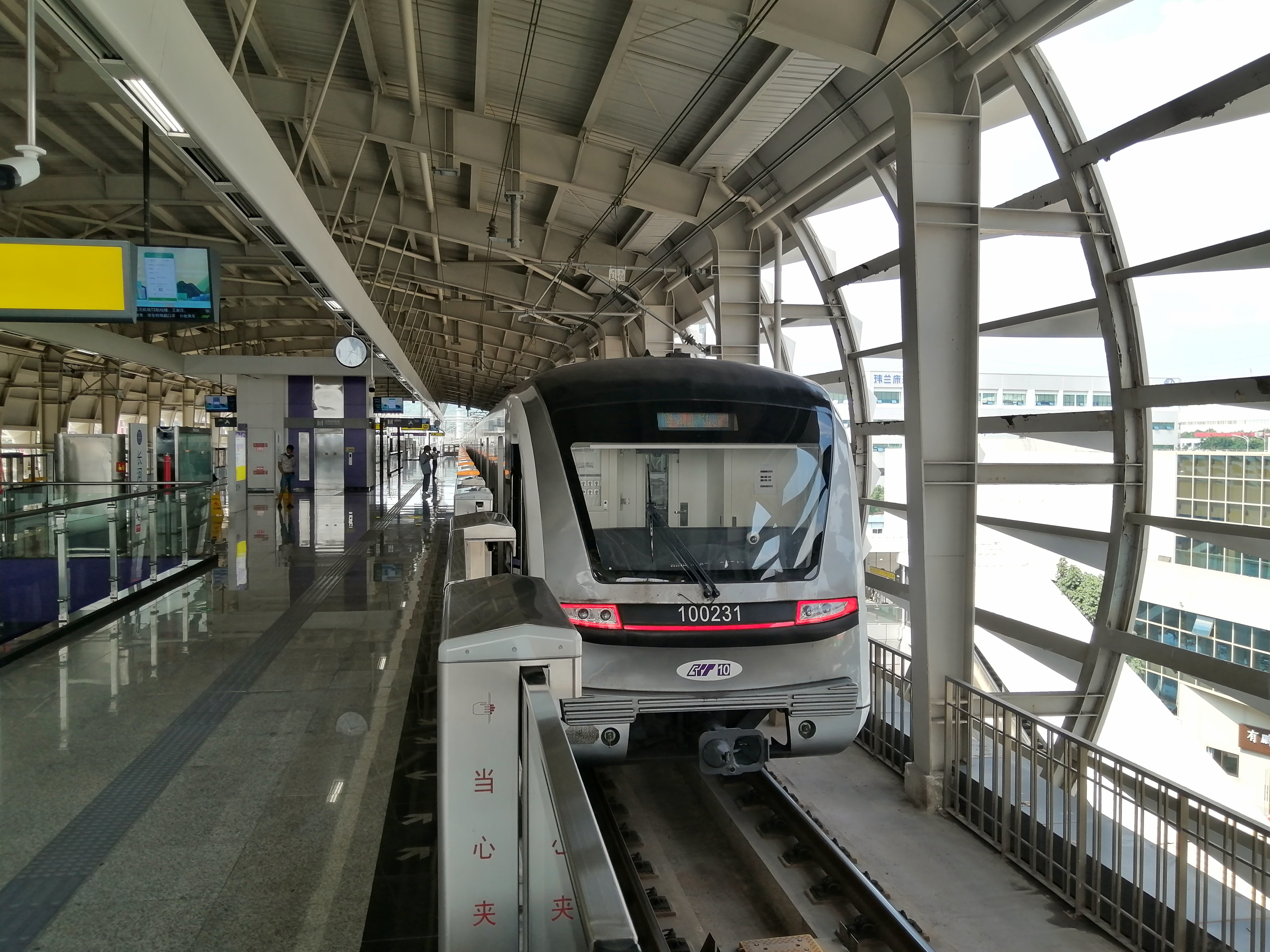
Line 10

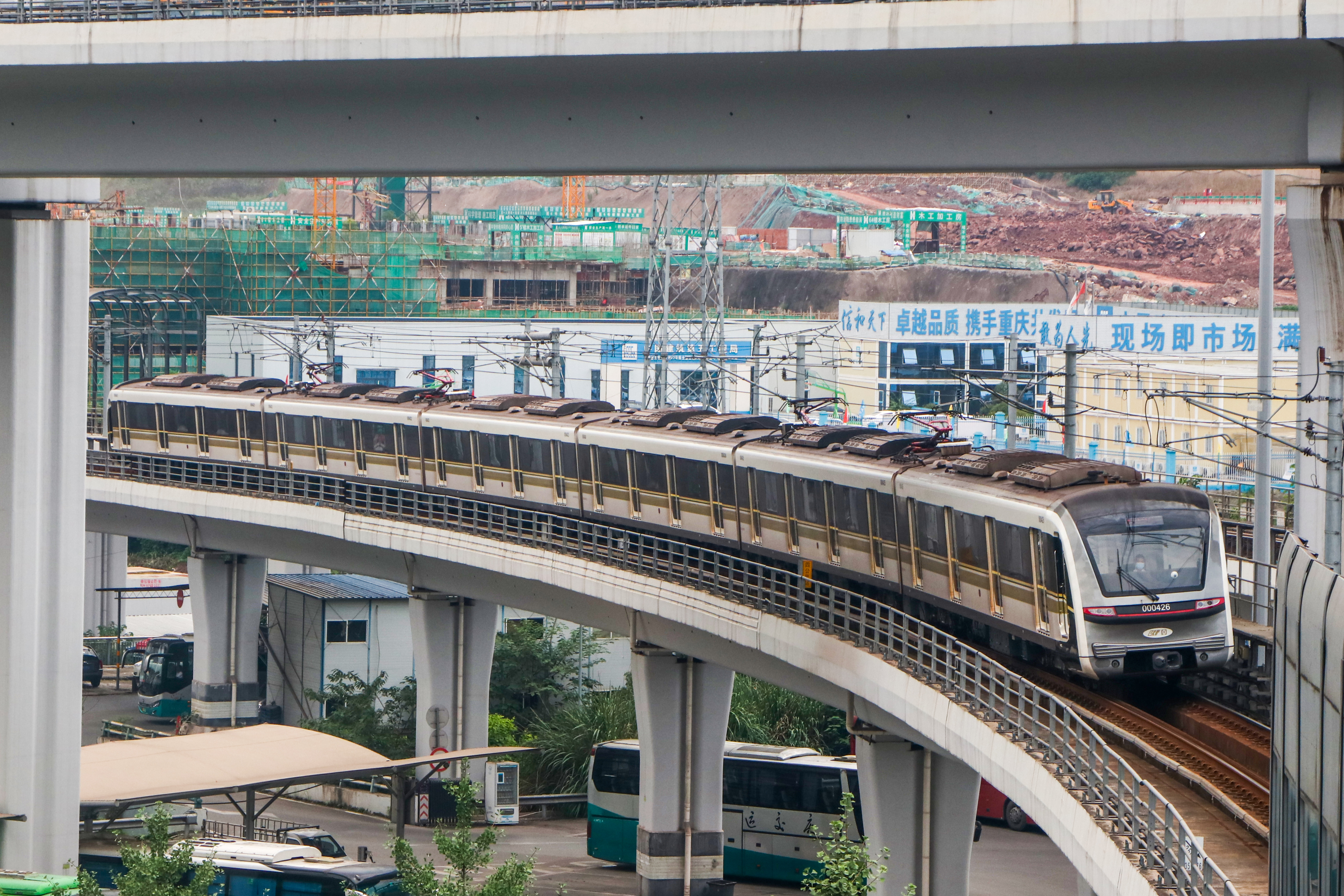
Loop Line

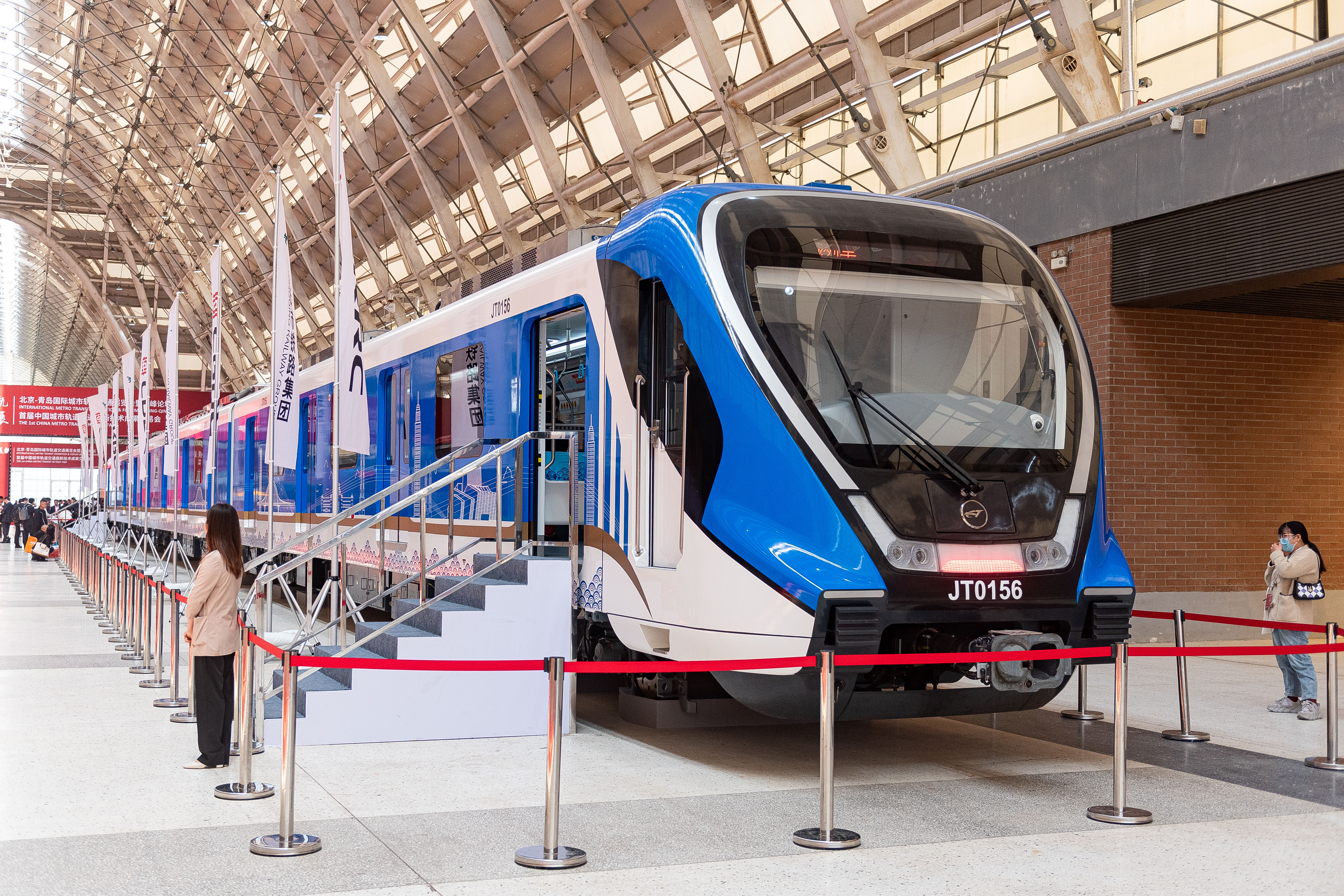
Jiangtiao Line

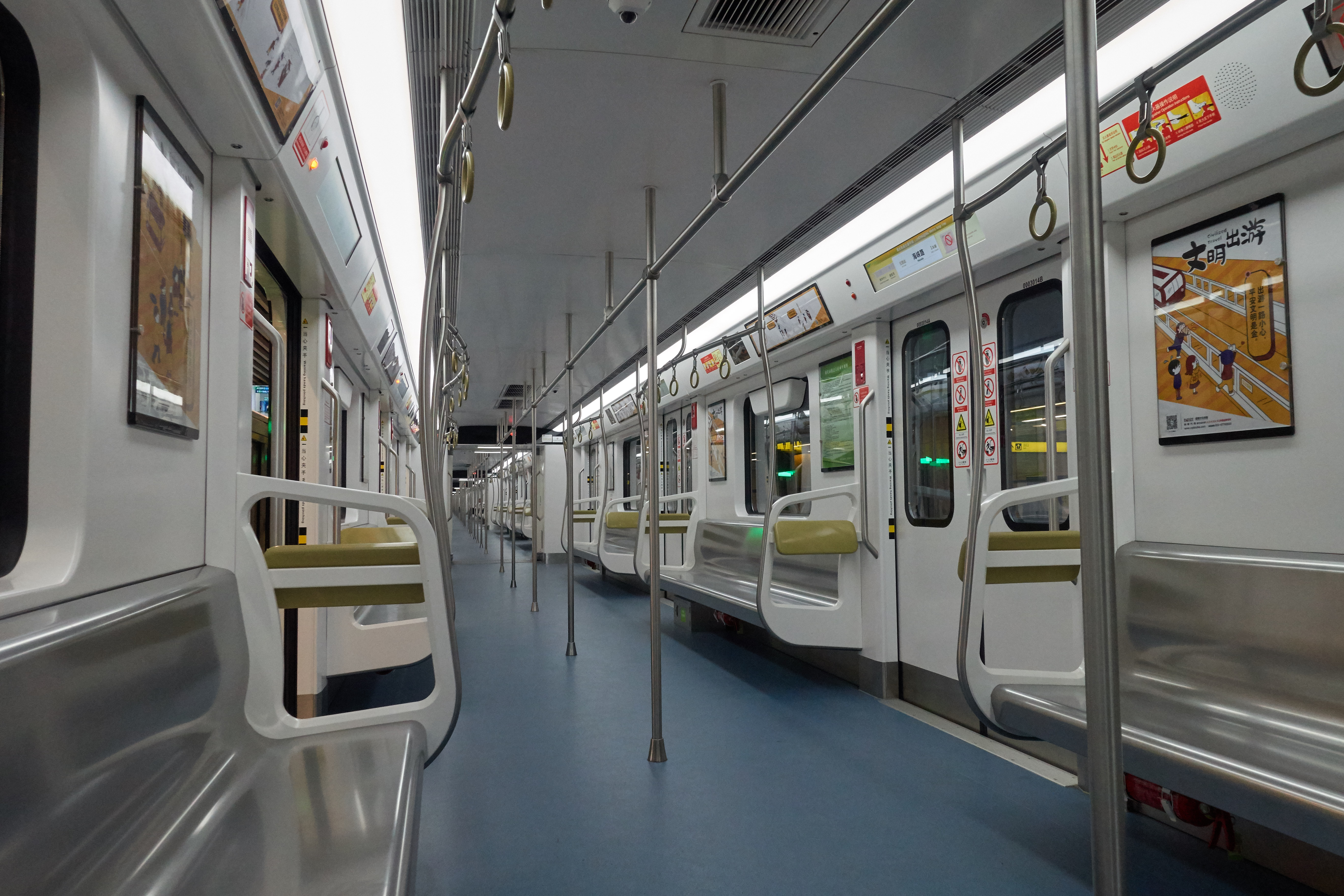
Train interior of Loop Line

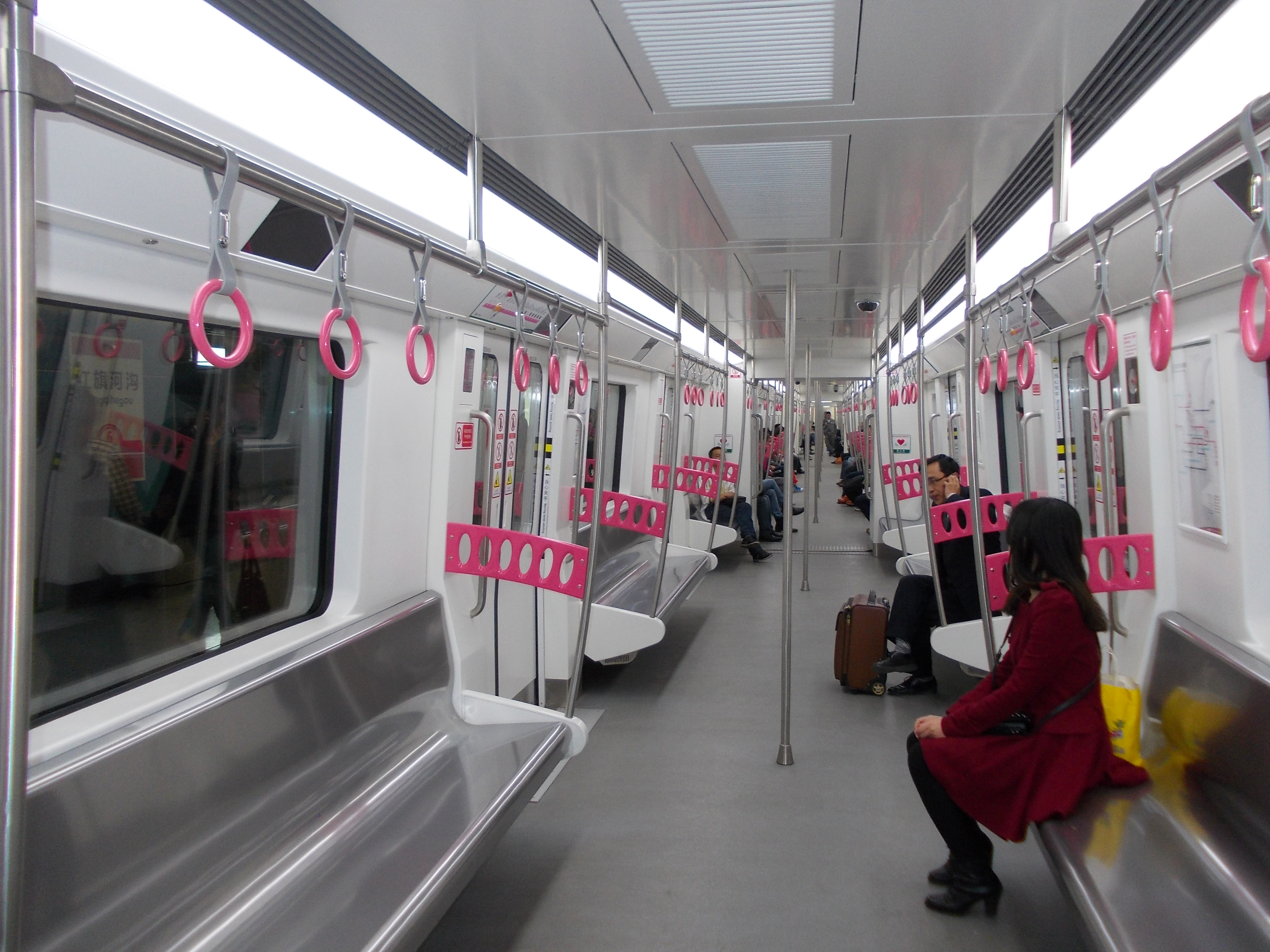
Train interior of Line 6

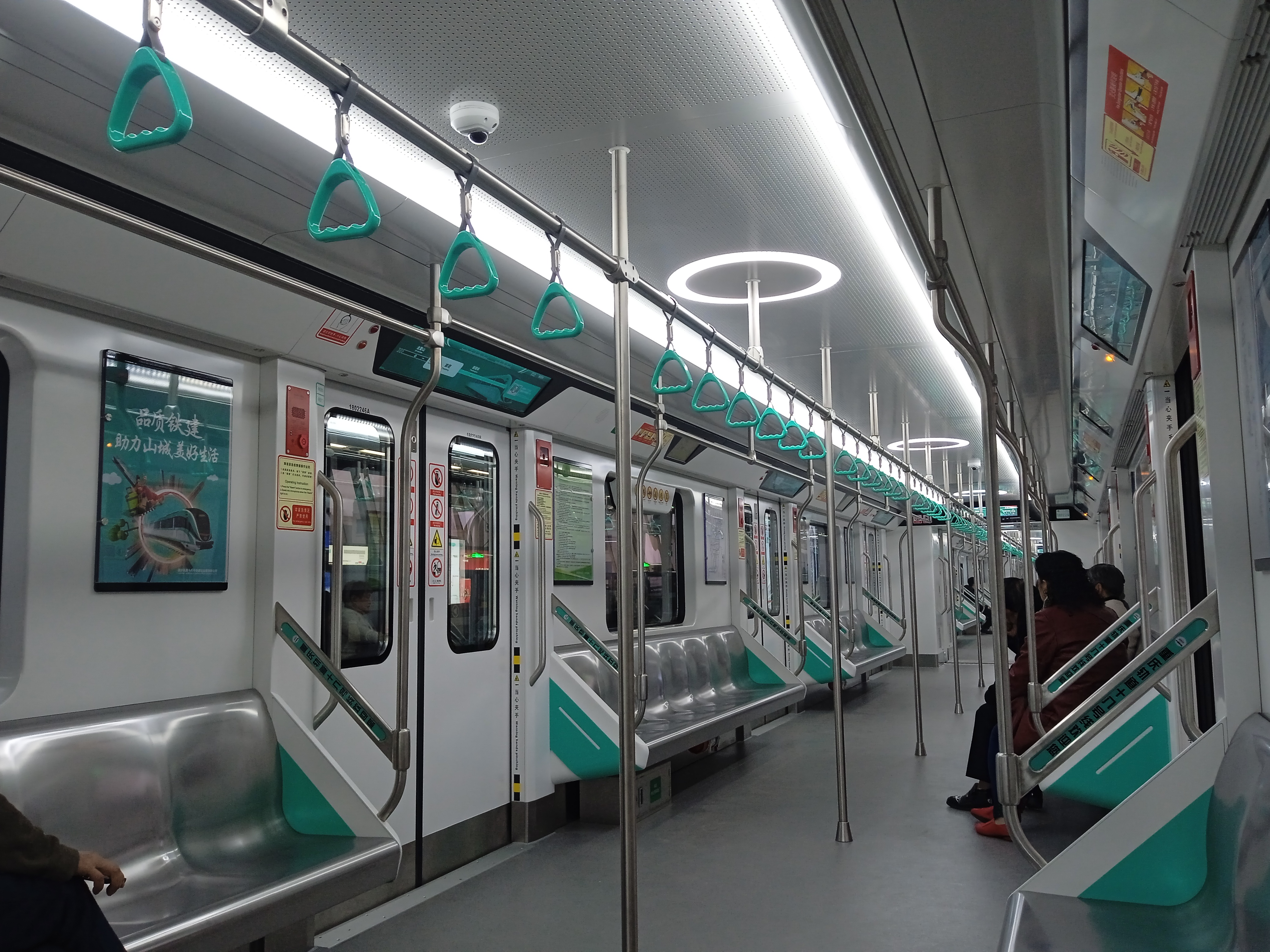
Train interior of Line 18

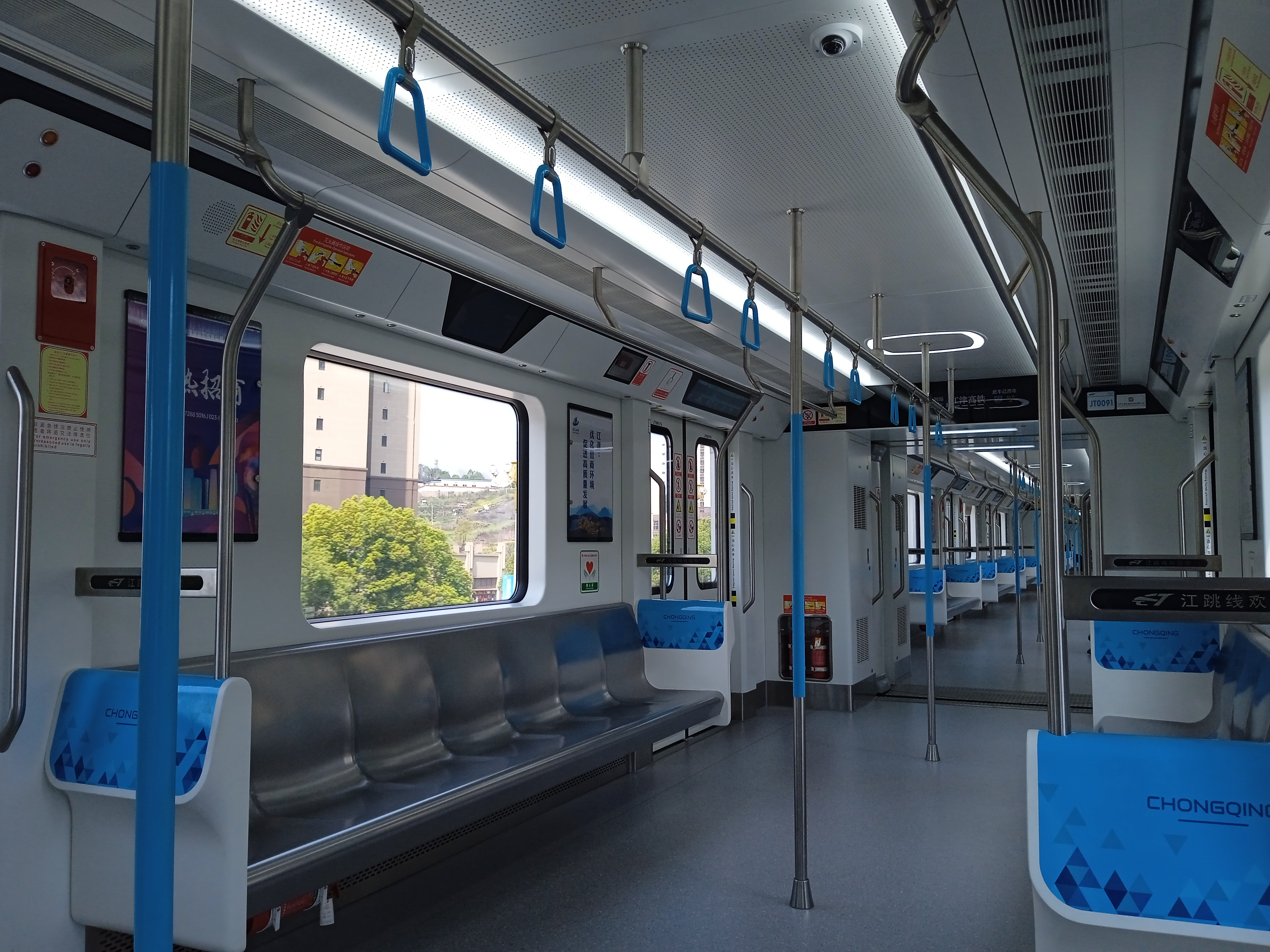
Train interior of Jiangtiao Line

== Visual design ==
Unlike most metro systems of other cities in China, CRT did not follow the design style of MTR Corporation in Hong Kong. The signage system was designed by GK Design Group in Japan, and the monorail lines are based on Hitachi Monorail technology. That gives the Chongqing Rail Transit a distinctive Japanese aesthetic, in contrast to other metro systems in China.

CRT also gave each line a theme about the local culture, and the stations on the line will have some art works in the theme.

| Line | Theme |
|---|---|
| Loop line | 印象重庆 (impressions of Chongqing) |
| Line 1 | 人文重庆 (folkways of Chongqing) |
| Line 2 | 巴渝文化 (Ba culture) |
| Line 3 | 寻常百姓 (ordinary folk) |
| Line 4 | 重庆艺文 (arts in Chongqing) |
| Line 5 | 陪都溯踪 (tracing provisional capital era) |
| Line 6 | 巴山渝水 (mountains and rivers of Chongqing) |
| Line 9 | 红岩精神 (Hongyan spirit) |
| Line 10 | 重庆记忆 (memories of Chongqing) |

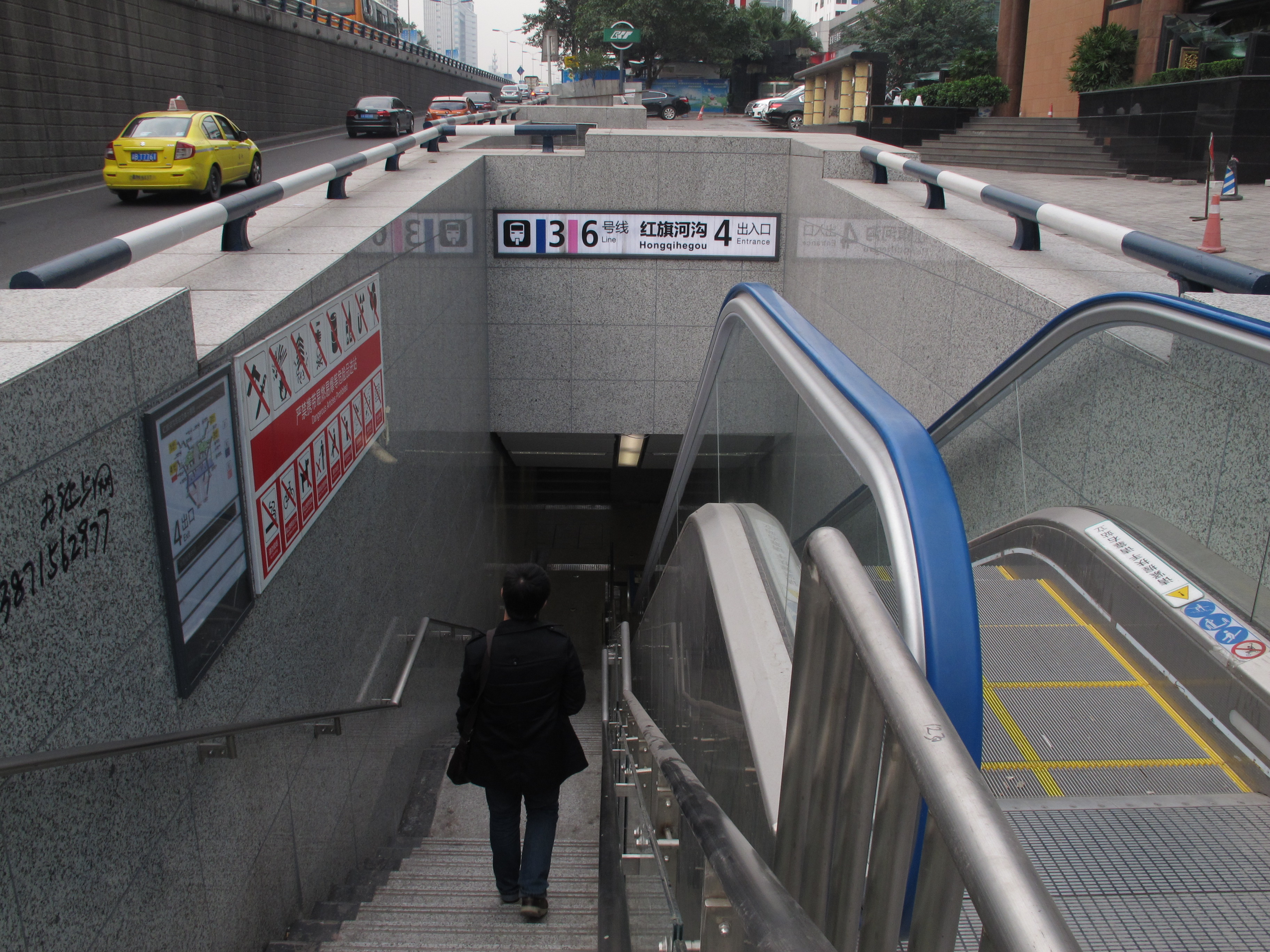
Entrance 4 of Hongqihegou station

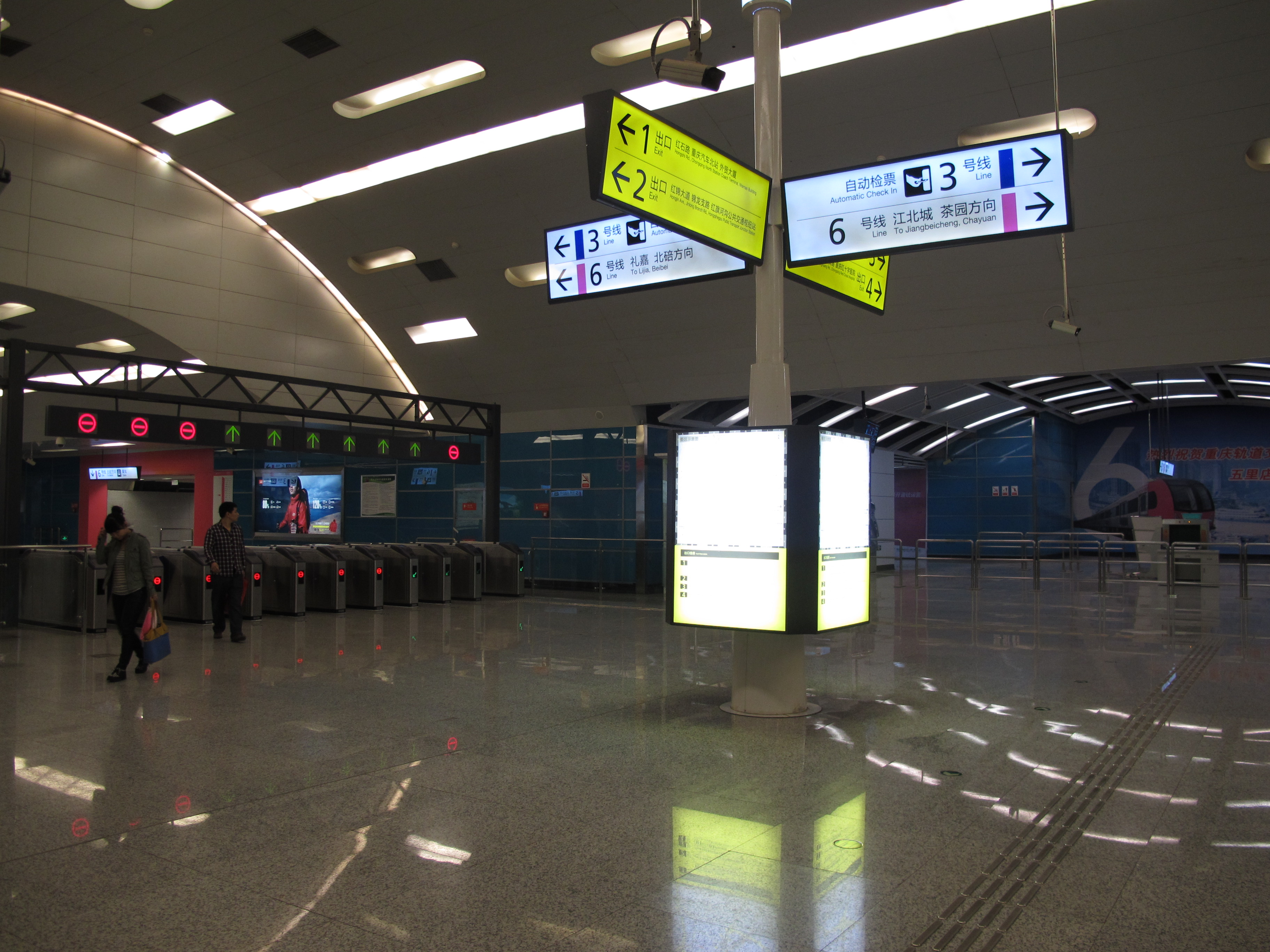
The navigation boards at the concourse of Hongqihegou station

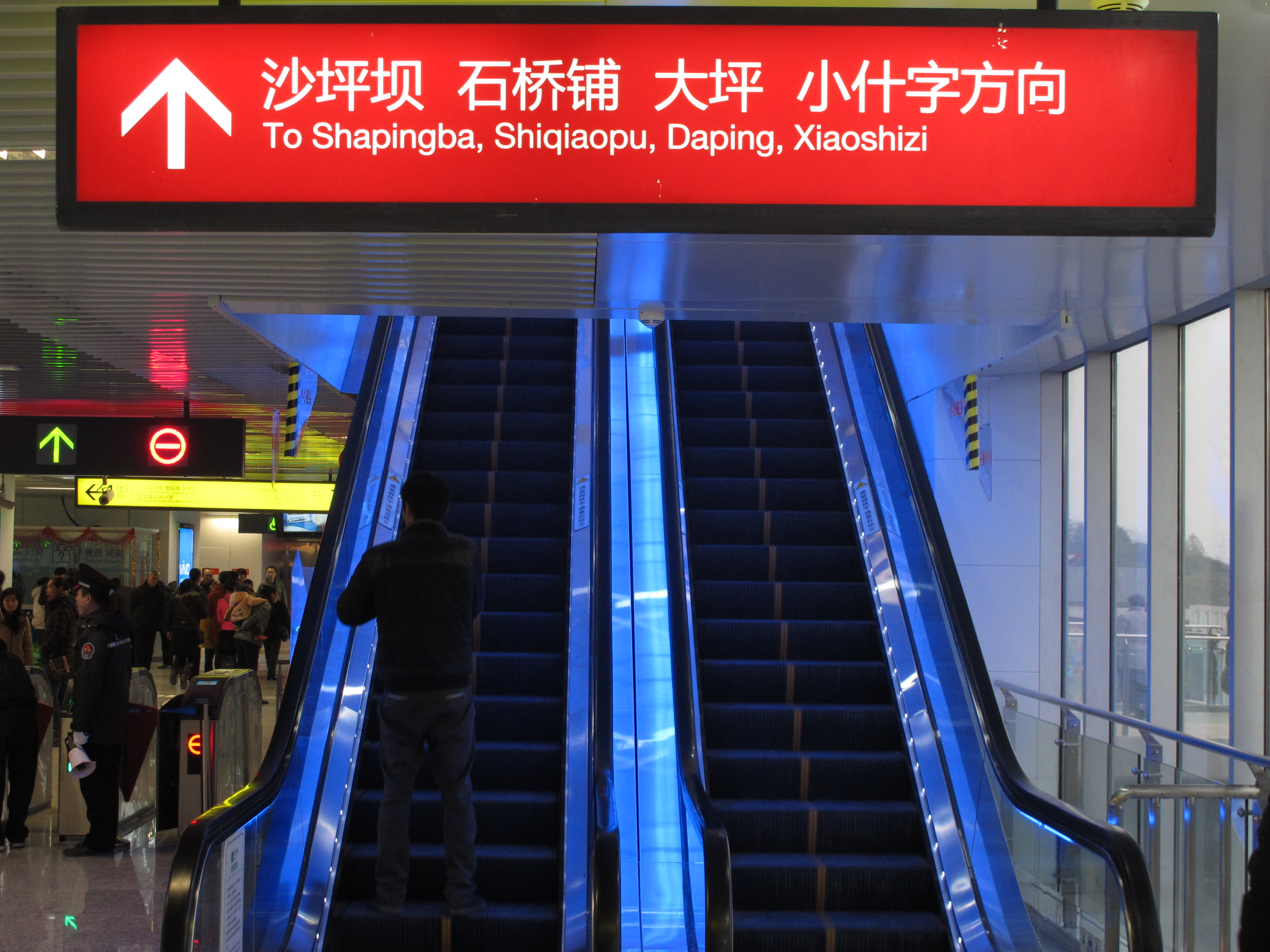
The navigation board at the escalator of Daxuecheng station

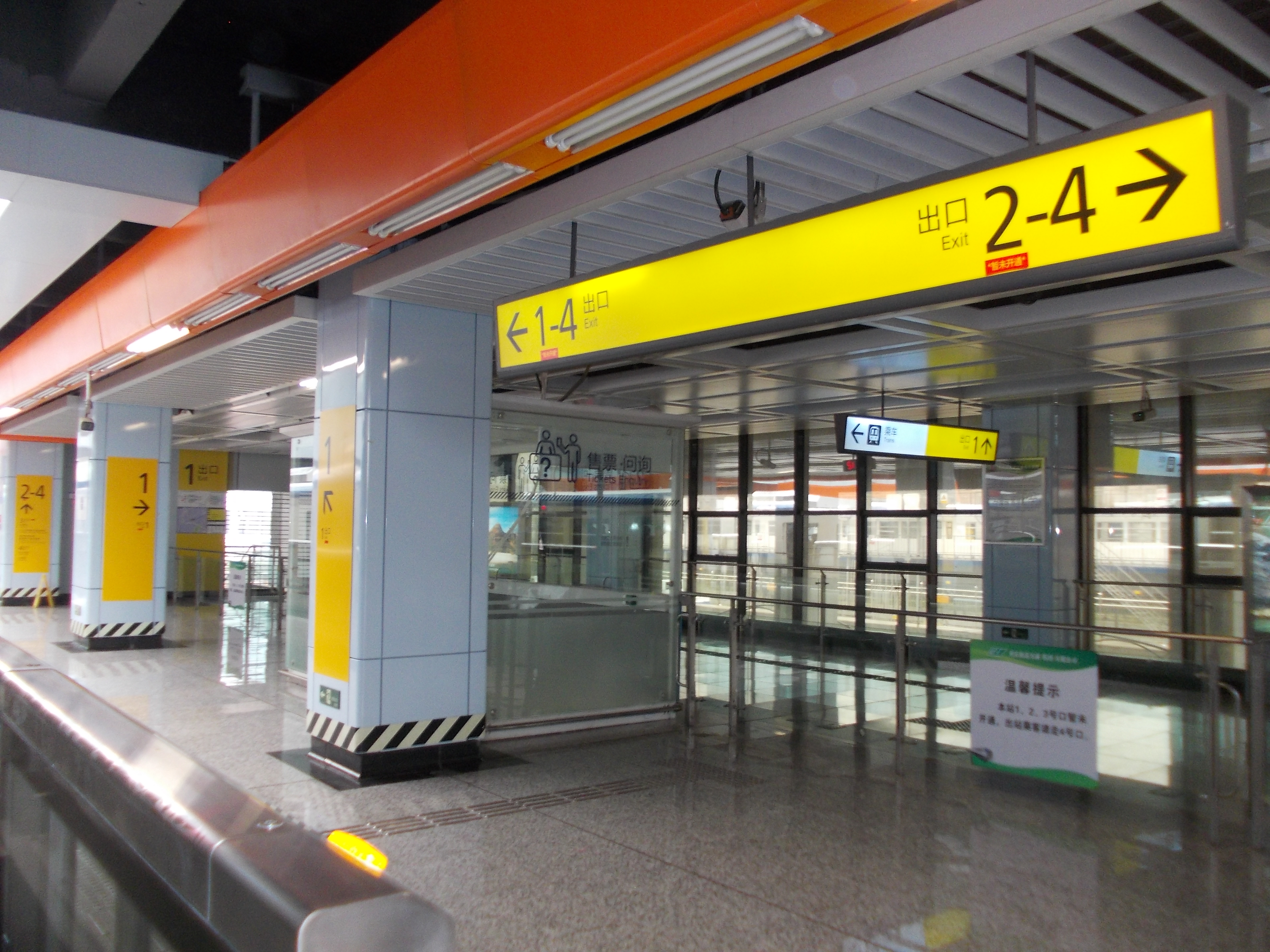
The navigation board at the platform of Tongjiayuanzi station

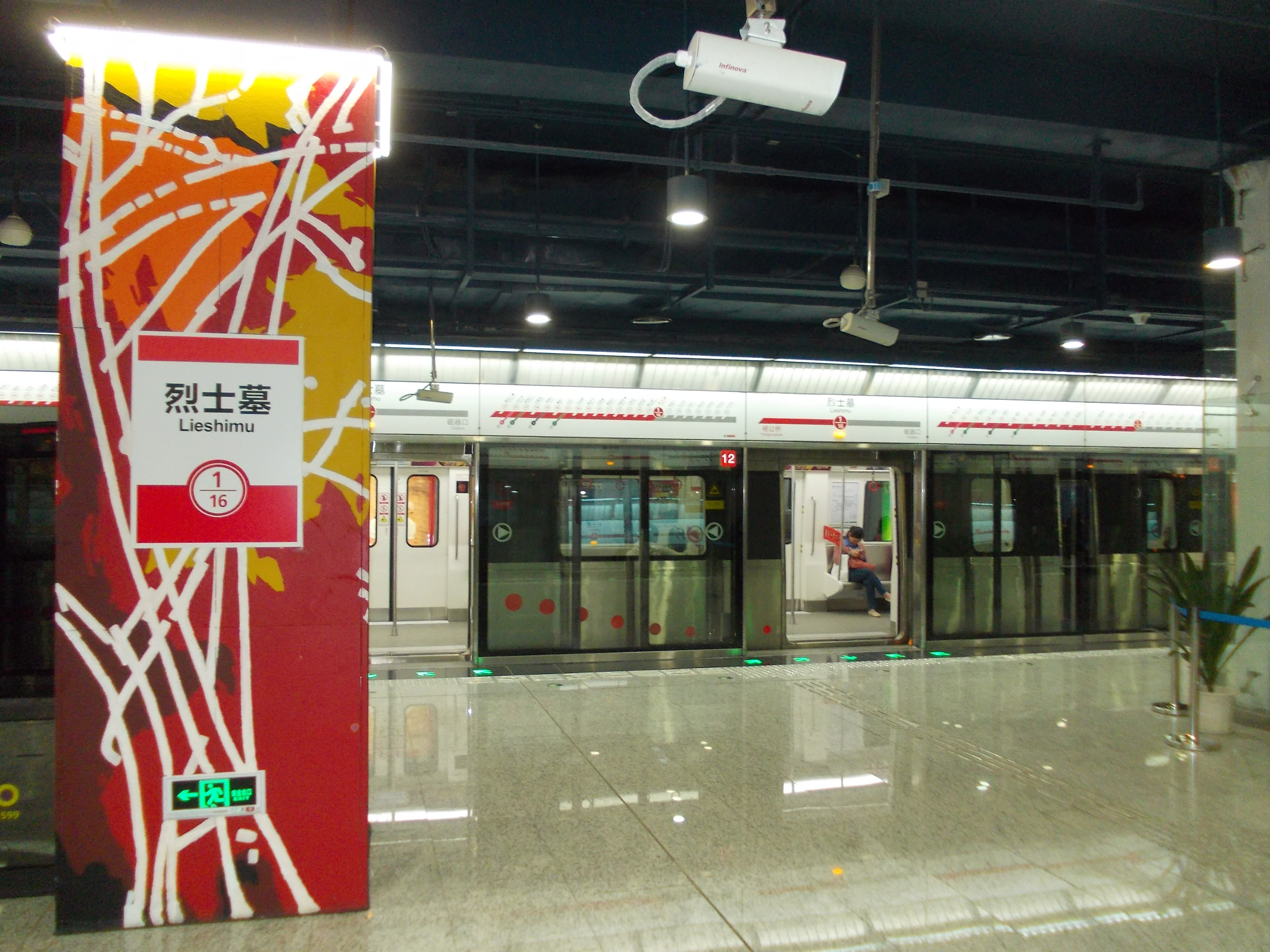
The platform of Lieshimu station

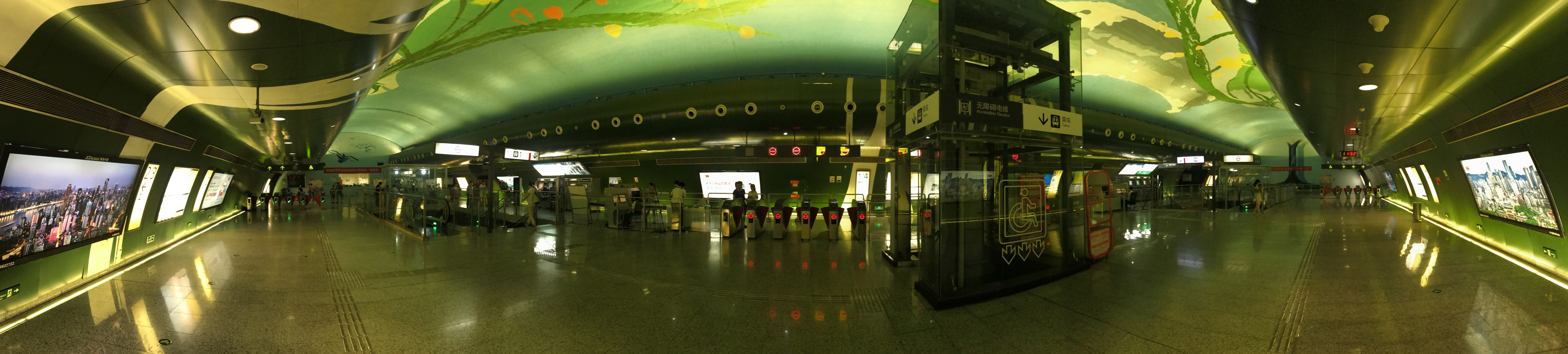
A panorama showing the painted concourse of Xiaolongkan station

== Expansion ==
CRT is expected to have 8 lines criss-crossing the urban districts by 2020 and a loop line connecting the commercial areas in the urban area. The other 9 lines are expected to be in operation by 2050.

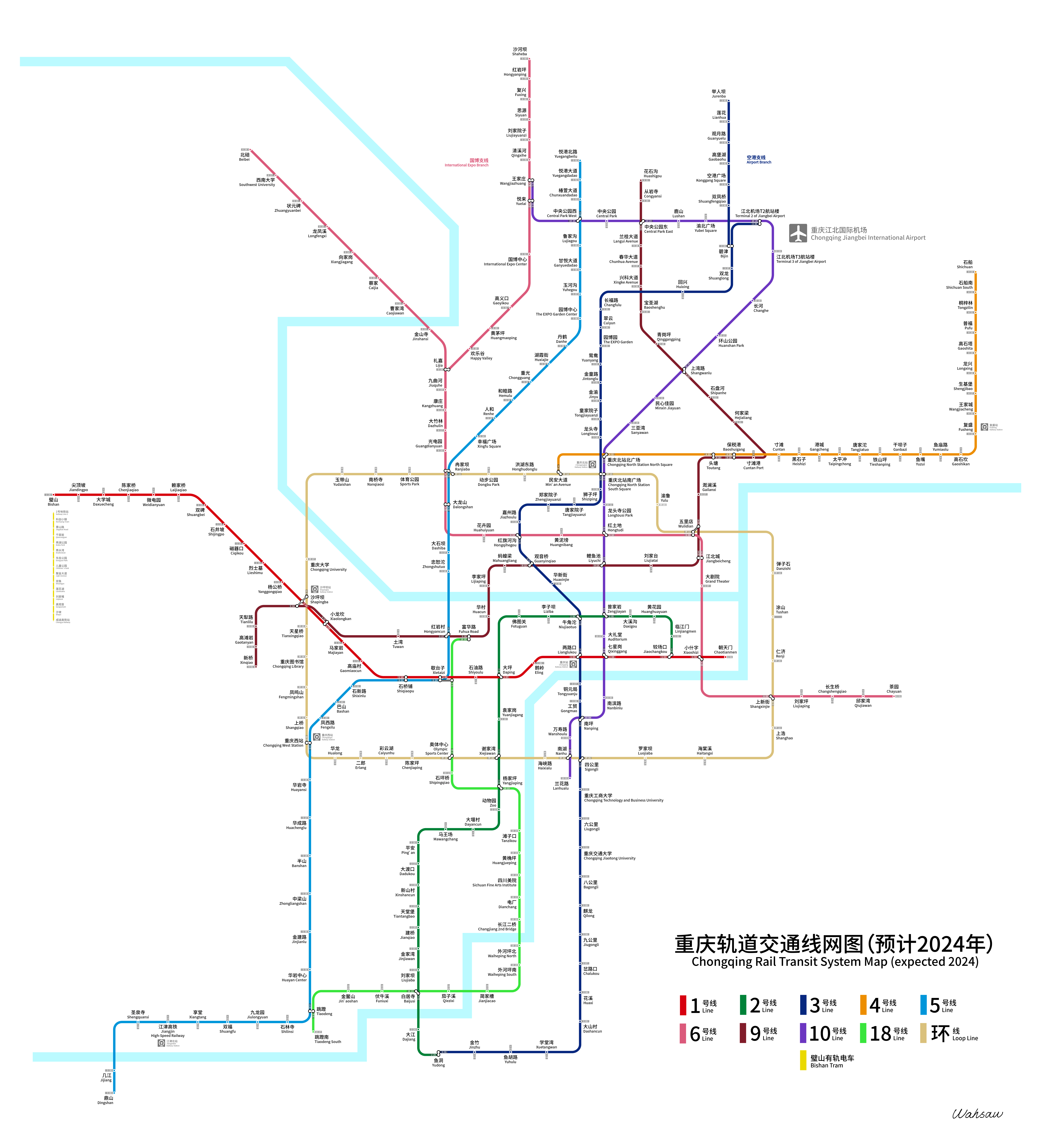
Map of Chongqing Rail Transit 2024 Plan

=== Phase 4 projects ===
The short-term plan, including Line 6 (branch), Lines 7, 15, 17, 24, 27 and Line 18 (Phase 2) was approved by NDRC. Construction on several lines started in March 2021. In April 2021, Lines 7 and 17 were redesigned from mostly elevated heavy monorails (similar to Lines 2 and 3) to conventional underground Type As metro lines akin to Lines 4, 5, 9 and 10.

Map of Chongqing Rail Transit including Phase 4 projects

| Planned opening | Project | | Terminus | | Track type | Rolling stock | Length (km) | New stations | Start of Construction | Ref. |
|---|---|---|---|---|---|---|---|---|---|---|
| 2027 | Line 15 | Phase 2 | Zengjia | Jingkou | Heavy-rail | 6D | 24.0 | 7 | 2021 | |
| 2027 or later | Line 18 | Northern extension | Fuhualu | Xiaoshizi | Heavy-rail | 6As | 10.6 | 8 | 2021 | |
| 2027 or later | Line 24 | Phase 1 | Lujiaobei | Guangyangwan | Heavy-rail | 6As | 19 | 12 | 2021 | |
| 2027 or later | Line 27 | Full line | Bishan | Huimin | Heavy-rail | 6D | 49 | 14 | Feb 2022 | |
| 2027 or later | Jiangtiao line | Phase 2 | Shengquansi | Dingshan | Heavy-rail | 6As | 4.524 | 2 | Dec 2022 | |
| 2028 or later | Line 7 | Phase 1 | Kexuecheng | Jinfeng | Heavy-rail | 4/6As | 27.8 | 18 | 2024 | |
| 2028 or later | Line 17 | Phase 1 | Shijiayuanzi | Daxuecheng | Heavy-rail | 4As | 14.17 | 9 | 2025 | |
| Total | | | | | | | 196.594 | 88 | | |

== See also ==
- Chongqing Suburban Railway
- List of metro systems
- List of monorail systems
- Urban rail transit in China
