= New North Zone =

New North Zone (simplified Chinese: 北部新区; traditional Chinese: 北部新區; pinyin: Běibù Xīn Qū) is an economic administrative zone in north Chongqing, China. It covers a land area of 130 square kilometres (50 sq mi). It was established in 2002 to include Chongqing Economic and Technological Development Zone, Chongqing High-Tech Industrial Development Zone and Chongqing Export Processing Trade Zone.

Chongqing Economic and Technological Development Zone was established in 1993. It covers an area of 9.6 square kilometres. The pillar industries in the zone include information and electronics, bio-pharmaceuticals, automobiles and motorcycles, refined chemicals and new materials, green food, and garments. Many international enterprises set up their factories in the zone.

== See also ==
- National Economic and Technological Development Zones
