= Liziba station =

Metro station in Chongqing, China

Coordinates: 29°33′03″N 106°32′07″E

Liziba 李子坝
- A train of Chongqing Rail Transit Line 2 coming through a residential building at Liziba

Chinese name

General information
- Location: Yuzhong District, Chongqing; China
- Operated by: Chongqing Rail Transit Corp., Ltd
- Line: Line 2
- Platforms: 2 side platforms

Construction
- Structure type: Elevated
- Architect: Ye Tianyi

Other information
- Station code: /

History
- Opened: 18 June 2005; 21 years ago

Services
Preceding station	Chongqing Rail Transit	Following station
Niujiaotuo towards Jiaochangkou	Line 2	Fotuguan towards Yudong
Location

Liziba is a monorail station on Line 2 of Chongqing Rail Transit in the direct-administered municipality of Chongqing, China. It is located in Yuzhong District and opened in 2005.

The station is unique in that it is located on the sixth to eighth floors of a 19-story residential building, with the monorail trains going through the middle of the building. It uses specialized noise reduction equipment to isolate station noise from the surrounding residence. Contrary to some misreporting, the station and building were actually constructed together as one whole structure, and the monorail was not retrofitted through the middle of an existing structure.

== Station structure ==
2F (8F); Platforms	Side platform
2F (8F); Platforms	Line 2 to Yudong (Fotuguan)
2F (8F); Platforms	Line 2 to Jiaochangkou (Niujiaotuo)
2F (8F); Platforms	Side platform
2F (8F); Platforms	Exit 2, customer service, vending machines
1F (6F); Concourse	Exit 1, customer service, vending machines, toilets

== See also ==
- Gate Tower Building, a building with a highway bridge passing through it
- Disney's Contemporary Resort - a monorail runs through the interior of the main building
