= Niujiaotuo station =

Metro station in Chongqing, China

Coordinates: 29°33′39″N 106°32′33″E

Niujiaotuo 牛角沱
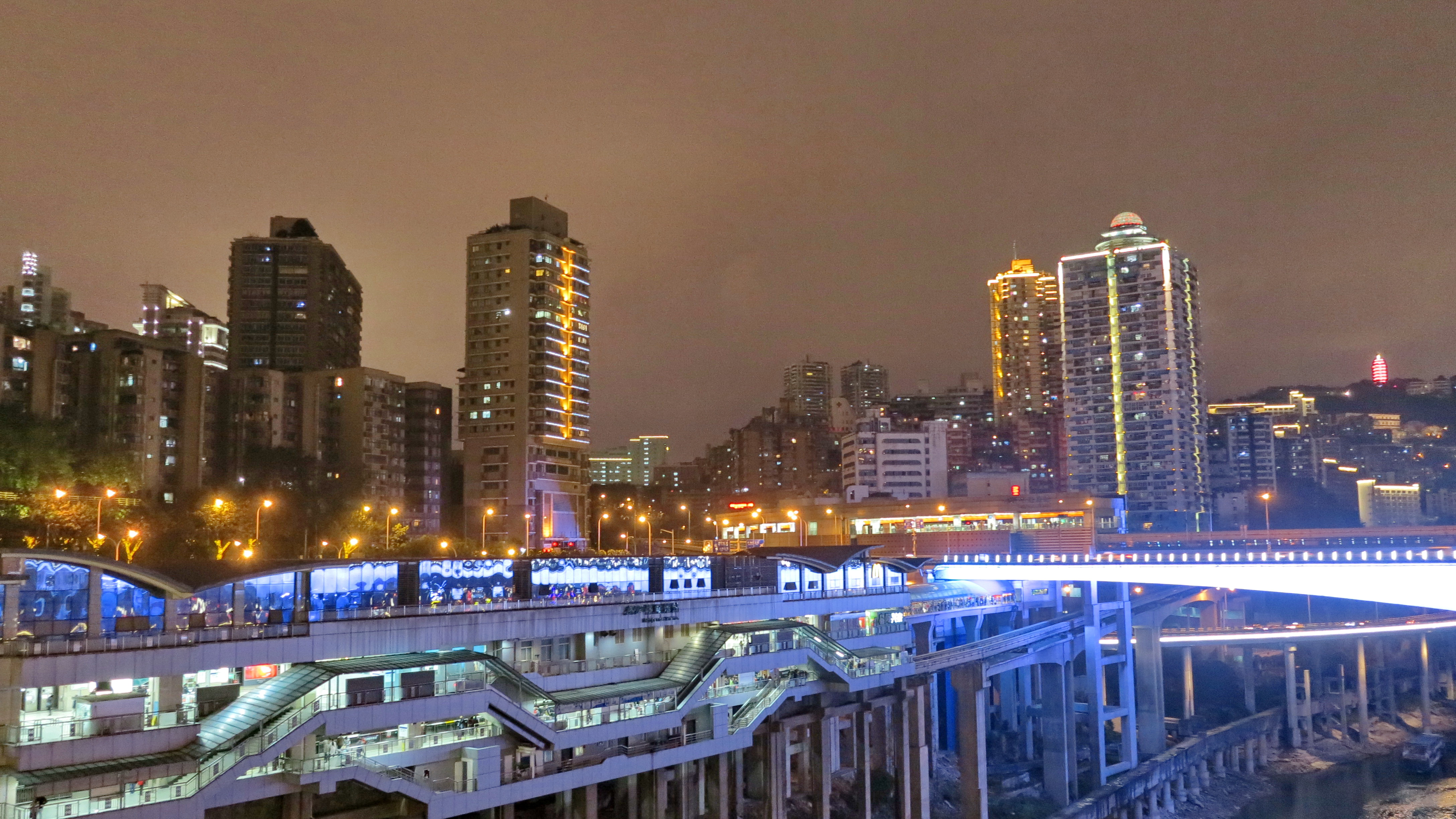

General information
- Location: Shangqingsi Subdistrict, Yuzhong District, Chongqing; China
- Operated by: Chongqing Rail Transit Corp., Ltd
- Lines: Line 2 Line 3
- Platforms: 4 side platforms

Construction
- Structure type: Elevated

Other information
- Station code: / /

History
- Opened: 18 June 2005; 20 years ago (Line 2); 29 September 2011; 14 years ago (Line 3)

Services
Preceding station	Chongqing Rail Transit	Following station
Zengjiayan towards Jiaochangkou	Line 2	Liziba towards Yudong
Lianglukou towards Yudong	Line 3	Huaxinjie towards Terminal 2 of Jiangbei Airport
Location

Niujiaotuo is an interchange station between Line 2 and Line 3 of Chongqing Rail Transit in Chongqing Municipality, China, which opened in 2005. It is located in Yuzhong District.

== Station structure ==
=== Line 2 ===
2F; Concourse	Exits 2-4, Customer service, Vending machines, Transfer passage to Line 3
1F; Platforms	Side platform
1F; Platforms	Line 2 to Yudong (Liziba)
1F; Platforms	Line 2 to Jiaochangkou (Zengjiayan)
1F; Platforms	Side platform

=== Line 3 ===
3F; Platforms	Side platform
3F; Platforms	Line 3 to Terminal 2 of Jiangbei Airport (Huaxinjie)
3F; Platforms	Line 3 to Yudong (Lianglukou)
3F; Platforms	Side platform
2F; Concourse	Exit 1, Customer service, Vending machines
1F	Transfer passage to Line 2, Toilets
