= Zengjiayan station =

Metro station in Chongqing, China

Zengjiayan 曾家岩
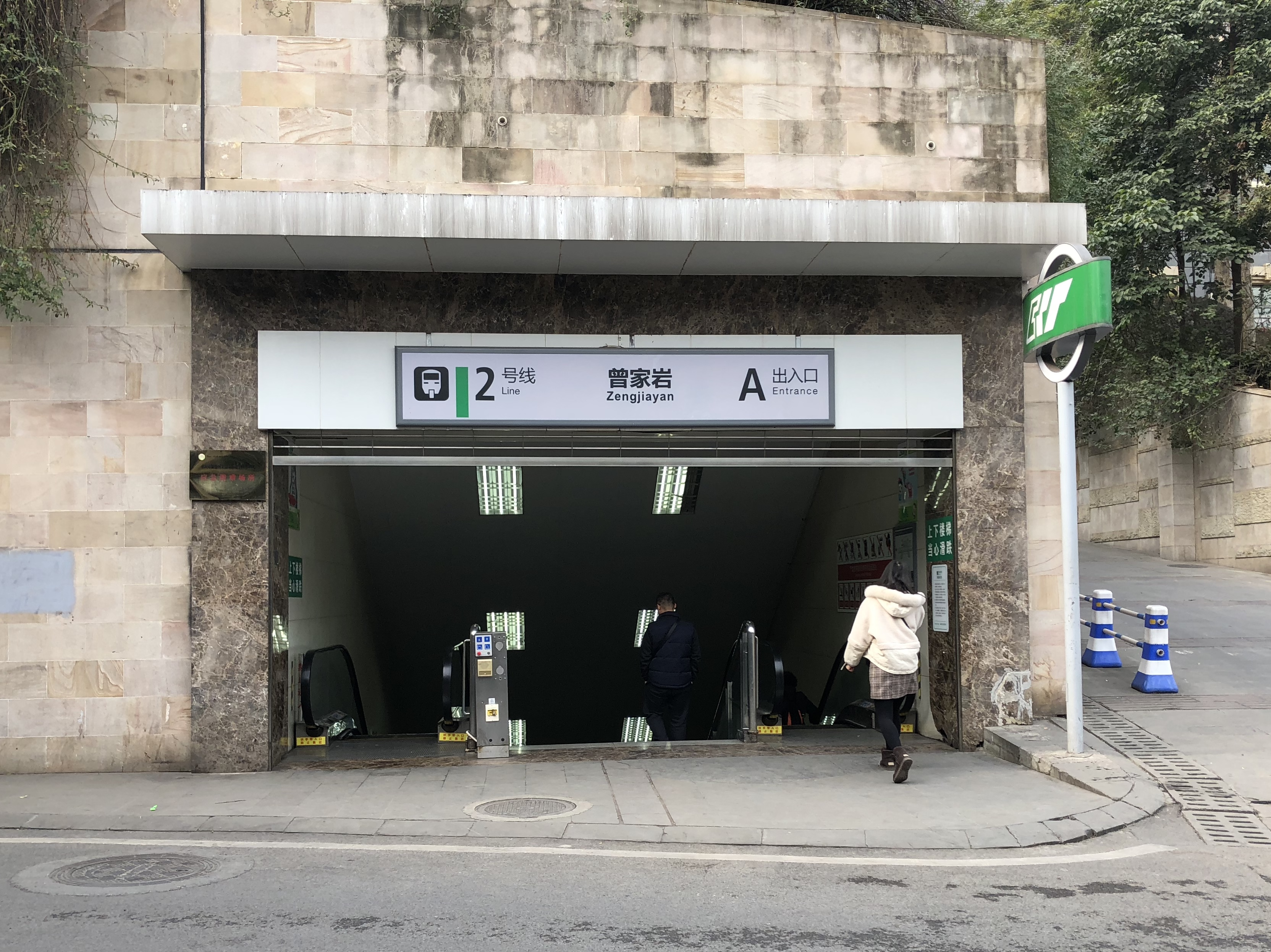

General information
- Location: Chongqing; China
- Coordinates: 29°34′9.23″N 106°32′47.04″E
- Operated by: Chongqing Rail Transit Corp., Ltd
- Lines: Line 2 Line 10
- Platforms: 2 side platforms

Construction
- Structure type: Elevated

Other information
- Station code: / /

History
- Opened: 18 June 2005; 20 years ago (Line 2); 18 January 2023; 3 years ago (Line 10)

Services
Preceding station	Chongqing Rail Transit	Following station
Daxigou towards Jiaochangkou	Line 2	Niujiaotuo towards Yudong
Chongqing People's Auditorium towards Lanhualu	Line 10	Liyuchi towards Wangjiazhuang
Location

Zengjiayan is a station on Line 2 and Line 10 of Chongqing Rail Transit in Chongqing Municipality, China. It is located in Yuzhong District. It opened in 2005.

== Station structure ==
3F; Platforms	Side platform
3F; Platforms	Line 10 to Wangjiazhuang (Liyuchi)
3F; Platforms	Line 10 to Lanhualu (Chongqing People's Auditorium)
3F; Platforms	Side platform
2F	Transfer lobby
1F; Platforms and concourse	Passages to the opposite platform and the transfer lobby
1F; Platforms and concourse	Side platform
1F; Platforms and concourse	Line 2 to Yudong (Niujiaotuo)
1F; Platforms and concourse	Line 2 to Jiaochangkou (Daxigou)
1F; Platforms and concourse	Side platform
1F; Platforms and concourse	Passages to the opposite platform and the transfer lobby, Exits, Customer service, Vending machines, Toilets
