= Fotuguan station =

Metro station in Chongqing, China

Coordinates: 29°32′56″N 106°31′45″E

Fotuguan 佛图关
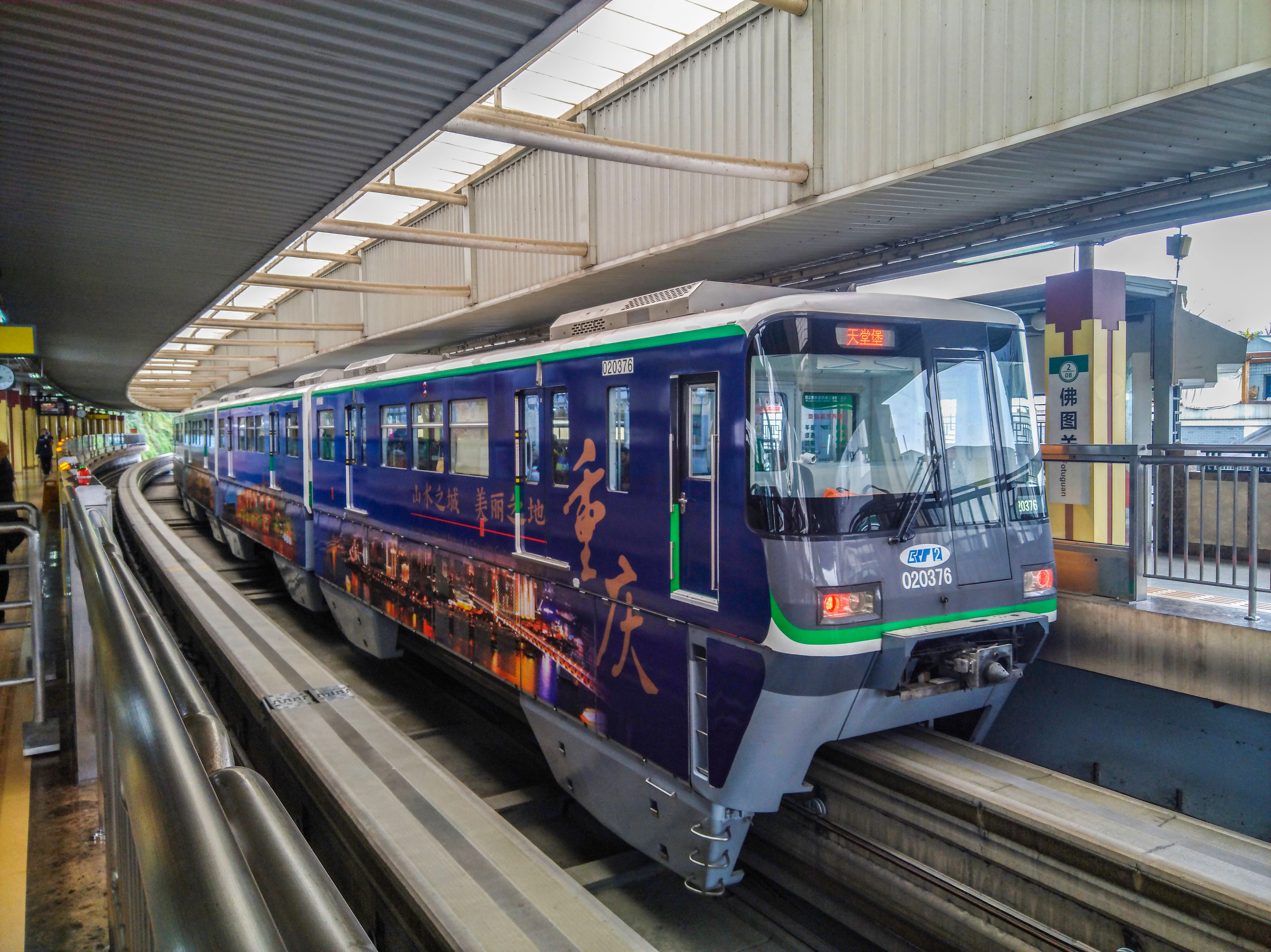

General information
- Location: Chongqing; China
- Operated by: Chongqing Rail Transit Corp., Ltd
- Line: Line 2
- Platforms: 2 side platforms

Construction
- Structure type: Elevated

Other information
- Station code: /

History
- Opened: 18 June 2005; 20 years ago

Services
Preceding station	Chongqing Rail Transit	Following station
Liziba towards Jiaochangkou	Line 2	Daping towards Yudong
Location

Fotuguan is a station on Line 2 of Chongqing Rail Transit in Chongqing Municipality, China. It is located in Yuzhong District. It opened in 2005.

== Station structure ==
2F; Platforms	Side platform
2F; Platforms	Line 2 to Yudong (Daping)
2F; Platforms	Line 2 to Jiaochangkou (Liziba)
2F; Platforms	Side platform
1F; Concourse	Exits, Customer service, Vending machines
