= Dajiang station =

Chongqing Rail Transit station

Dajiang 大江
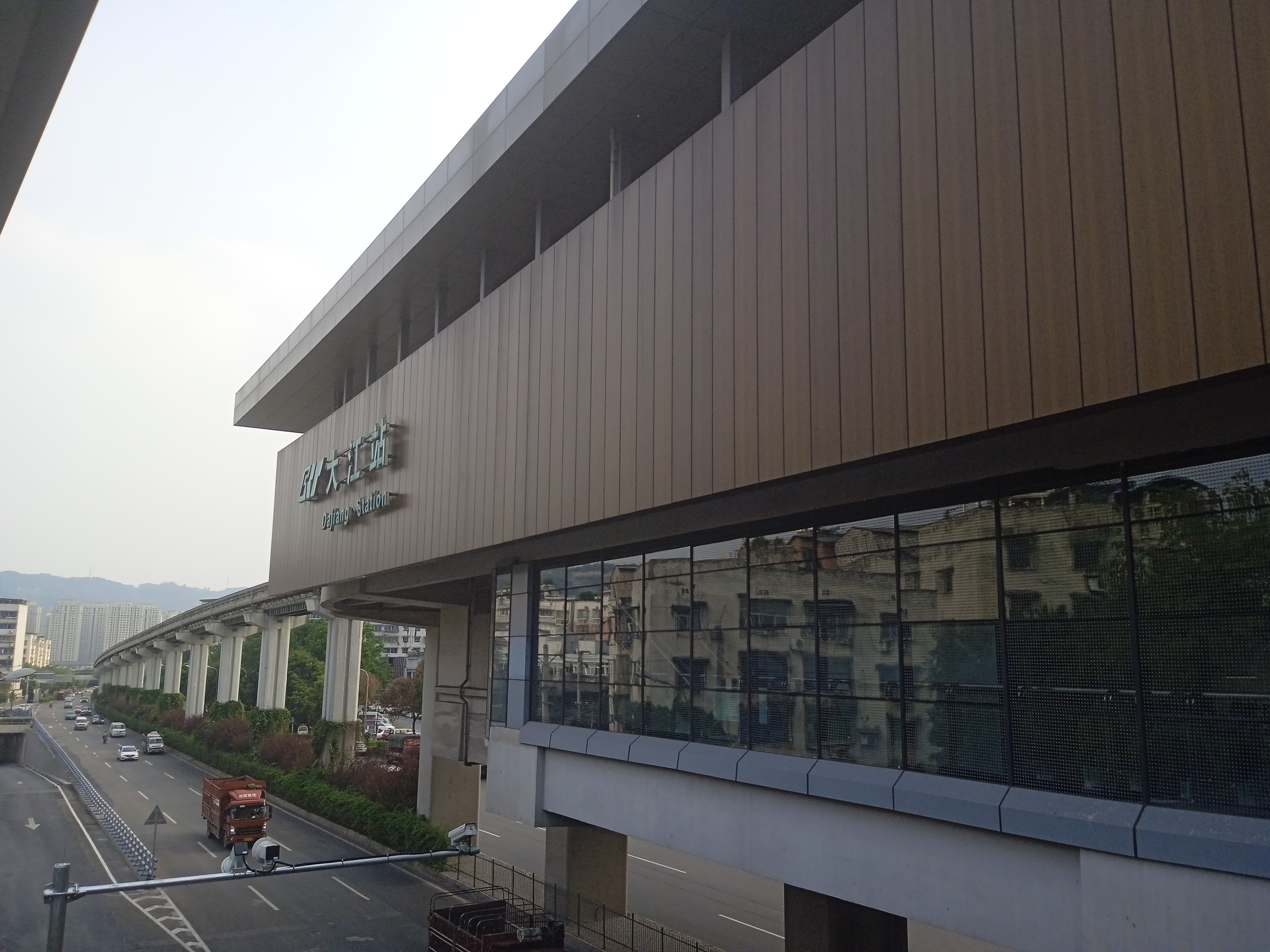

General information
- Location: Chongqing; China
- Coordinates: 29.3870°N 106.4972°E
- Operated by: Chongqing Rail Transit Corp., Ltd
- Line: Line 2
- Platforms: 2 side platforms

Construction
- Structure type: Elevated

Other information
- Station code: /

History
- Opened: 30 December 2014; 11 years ago

Services
| Preceding station | Chongqing Rail Transit | Following station |
|---|---|---|
| Baijusi towards Jiaochangkou | Line 2 | Yudong Terminus |
Location

Dajiang Station is a station on Line 2 of Chongqing Rail Transit in Chongqing municipality, China. It is located adjacent to the south end of Yudong Yangtze River Bridge in Ba'nan District and opened in 2014.

== Station structure ==
| 3F; Platforms | Side platform |
| 3F; Platforms | Line 2 to Jiaochangkou (Baijusi) |
| 3F; Platforms | Line 2 to Yudong (Terminus) |
| 3F; Platforms | Side platform |
| 2F; Concourse | Exits, Customer service, Vending machines, Toilets |
