= Huanghuayuan station =

Huanghuayuan station can refer to:

- Huanghuayuan station (Chengdu Metro), a metro station in Chengdu, China
- Huanghuayuan station (Chongqing Rail Transit), a metro station in Chongqing, China
