= Yudong =

Yudong may refer to the following locations in China:

- Yudong Station (鱼洞站; Yúdòng Zhàn), on Line 3 of Chongqing Rail Transit
- Yudong Bridge, Chongqing (鱼洞桥; Yúdòng Qiáo)
- Yudong Subdistrict, Huangshan (昱东街道; Yùdōng Jiēdào), in Tunxi District, Huangshan City, Anhui
- Yudong Subdistrict, Shijiazhuang (裕东街道; Yùdōng Jiēdào), in Yuhua District, Shijiazhuang, Hebei
- Yudong, Jiangsu (余东镇; Yúdōng Zhèn), town in Haimen
