= Daxigou station =

Metro station in Chongqing, China

Coordinates: 29°33′57″N 106°33′33″E

Daxigou 大溪沟
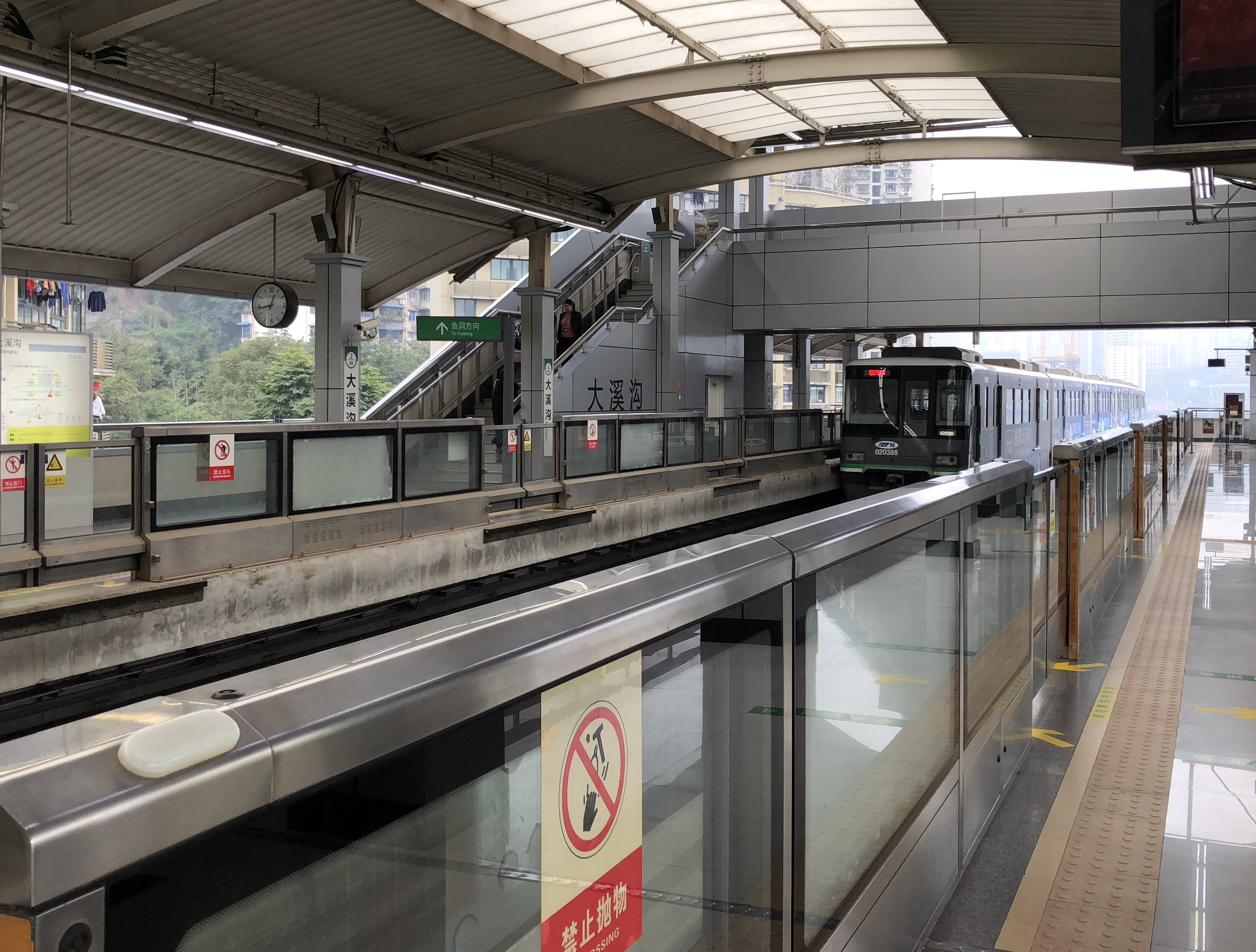

General information
- Location: Chongqing; China
- Operated by: Chongqing Rail Transit Corp., Ltd
- Line: Line 2
- Platforms: 2 side platforms

Construction
- Structure type: Elevated

Other information
- Station code: /

History
- Opened: 28 December 2004; 21 years ago

Services
| Preceding station | Chongqing Rail Transit | Following station |
|---|---|---|
| Huanghuayuan towards Jiaochangkou | Line 2 | Zengjiayan towards Yudong |
Location

Daxigou is a station on Line 2 of Chongqing Rail Transit in Chongqing Municipality, China. It is located in Yuzhong District. It opened in 2004.

== Station structure ==
| 1F; Platforms and concourse | Side platform |
| 1F; Platforms and concourse | Line 2 to Yudong (Zengjiayan) |
| 1F; Platforms and concourse | Line 2 to Jiaochangkou (Huanghuayuan) |
| 1F; Platforms and concourse | Side platform |
| 1F; Platforms and concourse | Exits, Customer service, Vending machines |
