= Baijusi station =

Chongqing Rail Transit station

Baijusi 白居寺
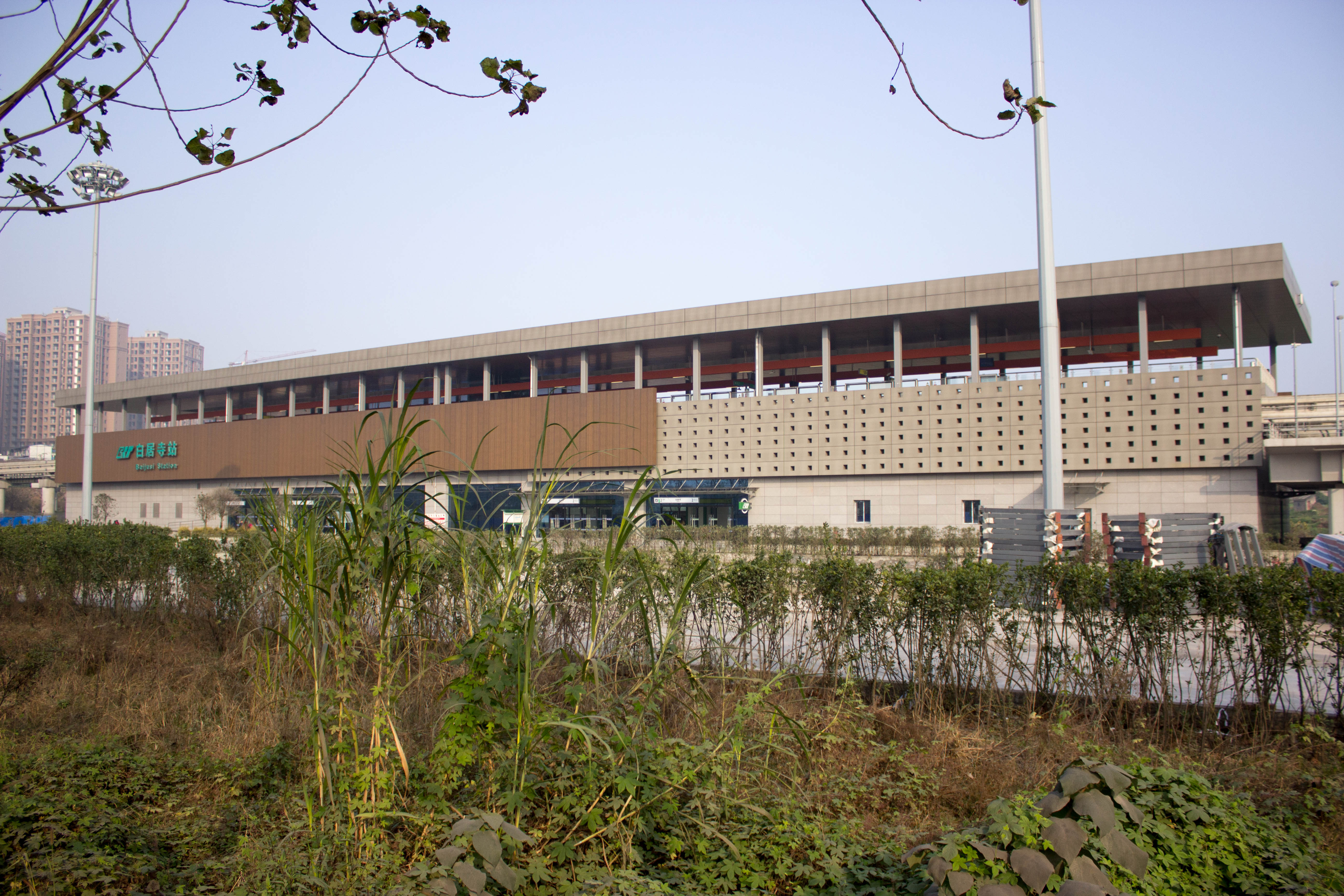

General information
- Location: Dadukou District, Chongqing; China
- Coordinates: 29.4175°N 106.4881°E
- Operated by: Chongqing Rail Transit Corp., Ltd
- Lines: Line 2 Line 18
- Platforms: 4 (2 island platforms)

Construction
- Structure type: Elevated (Line 2); Underground (Line 18)

Other information
- Station code: / / /

History
- Opened: 30 December 2014; 11 years ago (Line 2); 28 December 2023; 2 years ago (Line 18)

Services
Preceding station	Chongqing Rail Transit	Following station
Liujiaba towards Jiaochangkou	Line 2	Dajiang towards Yudong
Qiezixi towards Fuhualu	Line 18	Funiuxi towards Tiaodengnan
Location

Baijusi Station is a station on Line 2 and Line 18 of Chongqing Rail Transit in Chongqing municipality, China. It is located in Dadukou District and opened in 2014.

== Station structure ==
2F; Platforms	Line 2 to Jiaochangkou (Liujiaba)
2F; Platforms	Island platform
2F; Platforms	Line 2 to Yudong (Dajiang)
1F; Concourse	Exits, Customer service, Vending machines, Toilets

=== Line 18 Platforms ===
F2; Platforms	Line 18 to Fuhualu (Qiezixi)
F2; Platforms	Island platform
F2; Platforms	Line 18 to Tiaodengnan (Funiuxi)
