= Huanghuayuan station (Chongqing Rail Transit) =

Metro station in Chongqing, China

Coordinates: 29°33′47″N 106°33′55″E

Huanghuayuan 黄花园
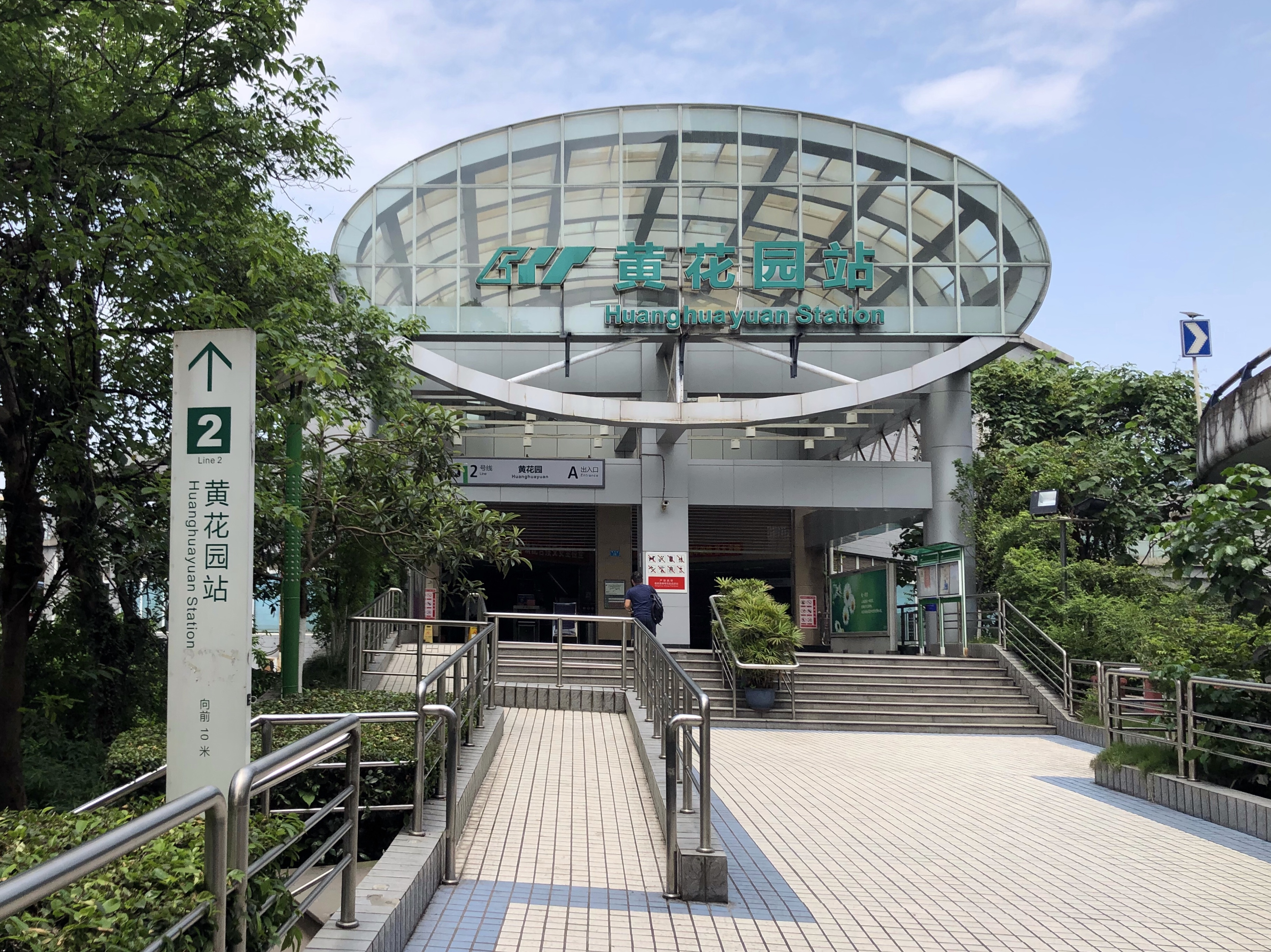

General information
- Location: Chongqing; China
- Operated by: Chongqing Rail Transit Corp., Ltd
- Line: Line 2
- Platforms: 2 side platforms

Construction
- Structure type: Elevated

Other information
- Station code: /

History
- Opened: 18 June 2005; 20 years ago

Services
Preceding station	Chongqing Rail Transit	Following station
Linjiangmen towards Jiaochangkou	Line 2	Daxigou towards Yudong
Location

Huanghuayuan is a station on Line 2 of Chongqing Rail Transit in Chongqing Municipality, China. It is located in Yuzhong District. It opened in 2005.

== Station structure ==
1F; Platforms and concourse	Side platform
1F; Platforms and concourse	Line 2 to Yudong (Daxigou)
1F; Platforms and concourse	Line 2 to Jiaochangkou (Linjiangmen)
1F; Platforms and concourse	Side platform
1F; Platforms and concourse	Exits, Customer service, Vending machines
