= Lianglukou station =

Metro station in Chongqing, China

Lianglukou 两路口
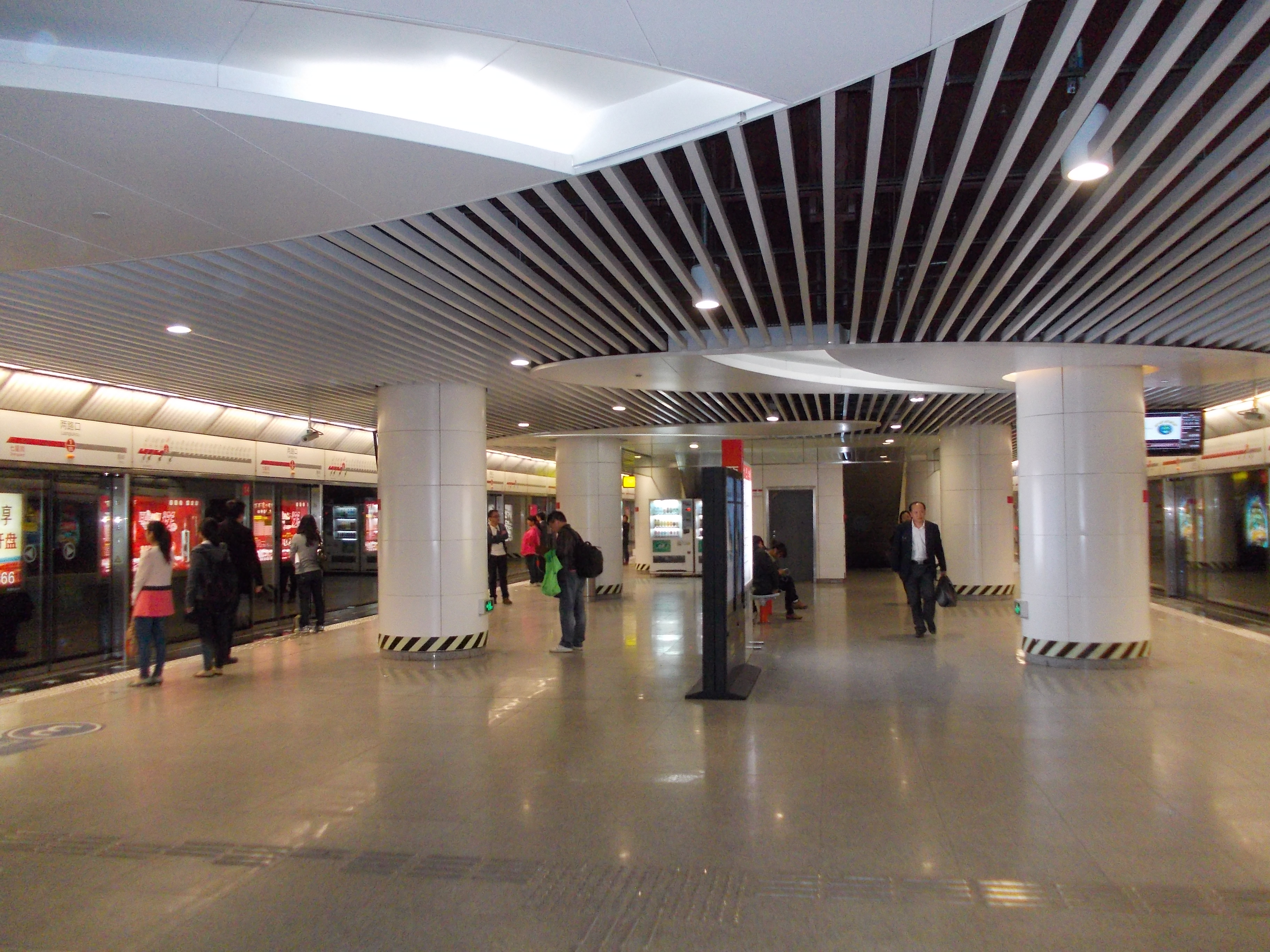
- Line 1 platform

General information
- Location: Chongqing; China
- Coordinates: 29.5558°N 106.5451°E
- Operated by: Chongqing Rail Transit Corp., Ltd
- Lines: Line 1 Line 3
- Platforms: 4 (2 island platforms)

Construction
- Structure type: Underground

Other information
- Station code: /, /

History
- Opened: 28 July 2011; 14 years ago (Line 1); 29 September 2011; 14 years ago (Line 3)

Services
Preceding station	Chongqing Rail Transit	Following station
Qixinggang towards Chaotianmen	Line 1	Eling towards Bishan
Tongyuanju towards Yudong	Line 3	Niujiaotuo towards Terminal 2 of Jiangbei Airport
Location

Lianglukou is an interchange station between Line 1 and Line 3 of Chongqing Rail Transit in Chongqing Municipality, China, which opened in 2011. It is located in Yuzhong District.

It is the closest metro station to Chongqing railway station and therefore is often used as an interchange with that, accessed by using the Huangguan Escalator.

== Station structure ==
B2	Exits 1-4
B3; Concourse	Exits 5-7, Customer service, Vending machines
B4; Platforms	Line 1 to Bishan (Eling)
B4; Platforms	Island platform
B4; Platforms	Line 1 to Chaotianmen (Qixinggang)
B5; Platforms	Line 3 to Terminal 2 of Jiangbei Airport (Niujiaotuo)
B5; Platforms	Island platform
B5; Platforms	Line 3 to Yudong (Tongyuanju)

== Gallery ==
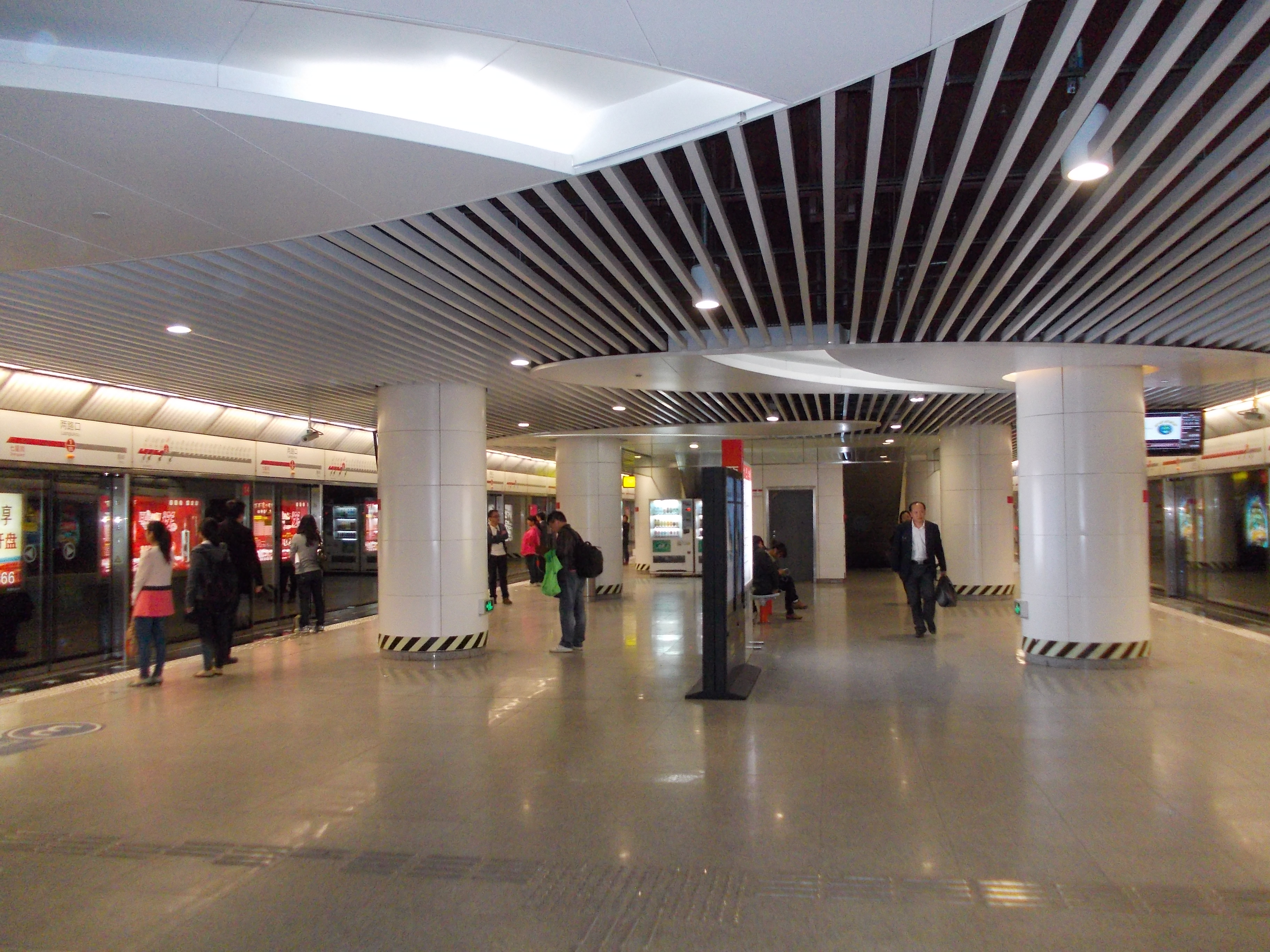
Line 1 platform

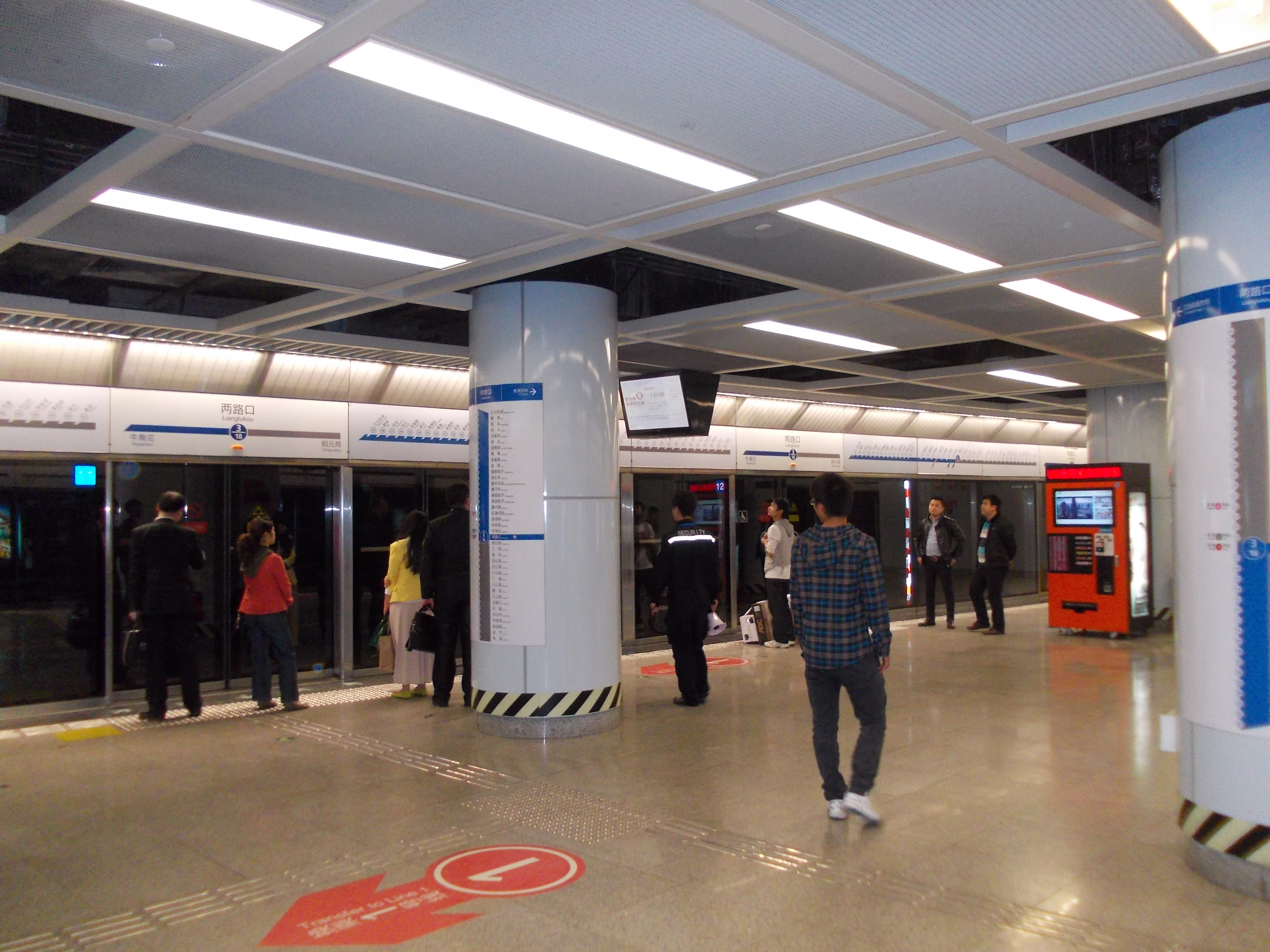
Line 3 platform
