= Huangguan Escalator =

Escalator in Chongqing, China

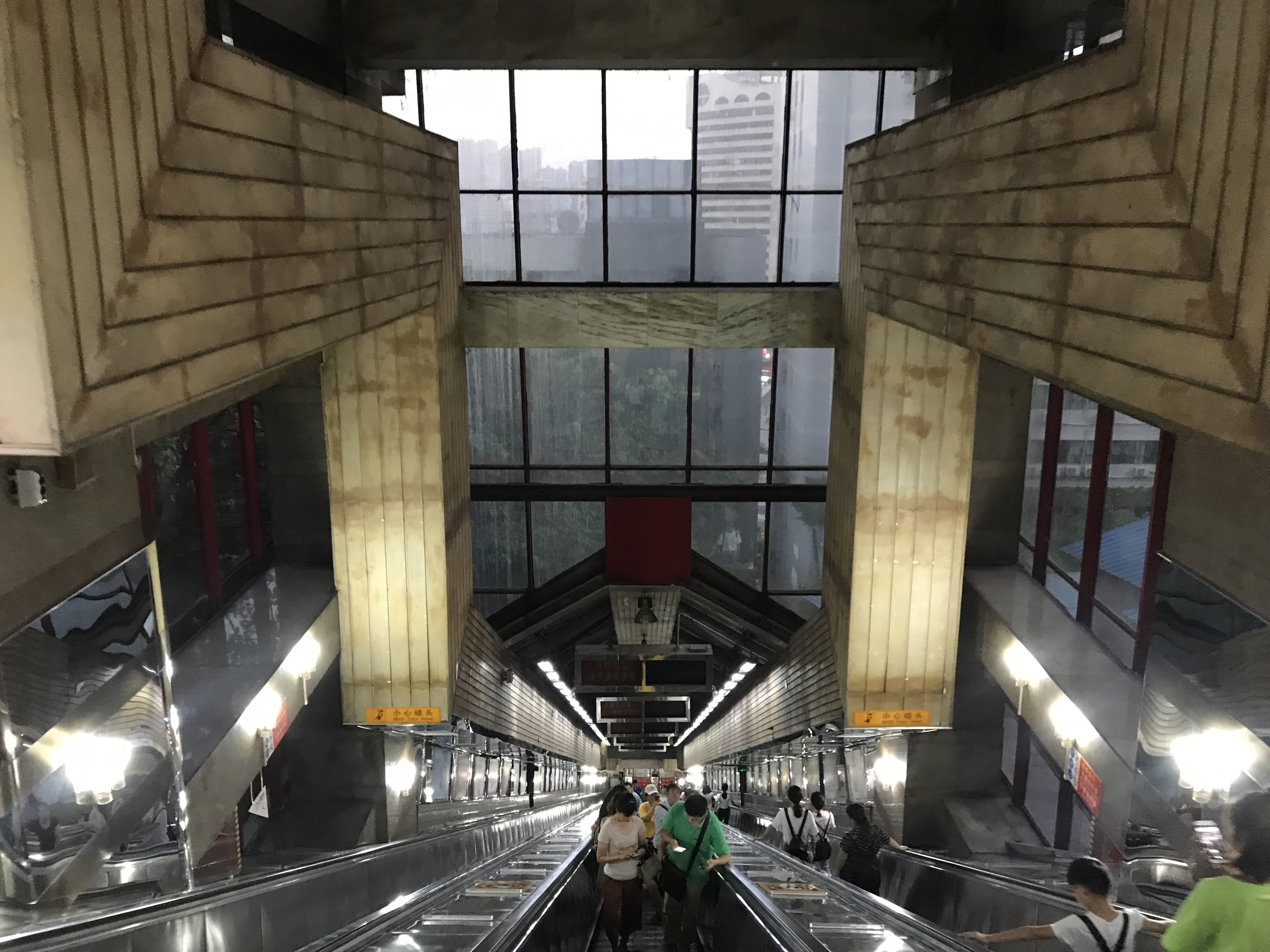
Inside the Huangguan Escalator

The Huangguan Escalator (Chinese: 皇冠大扶梯; lit. 'Crown Grand Escalator', also known as the Lianglukou Escalator) is an escalator in Chongqing, China.

Constructed in 1993 and completed in 1996, the Huangguan Escalator was the highest single-grading escalator in China and Asia when it was built. The escalator replaced an earlier funicular railway. The material used for building the escalator was imported, and the design and construction were directed by a local engineer, who also directed the construction of Chongqing Amusement Park.

Currently, it is the third-highest escalator in Asia, with a height less than the escalator in Rustaveli station in the Tbilisi Metro (60 meters high) and an escalator in the Pyongyang Metro, North Korea (64 meters high). It is 112 metres (367 ft) long and 1.3 metres (4.3 ft) wide, with a height of about 53 metres (174 ft), and connects the Chongqing railway station at Caiyuanba to Lianglukou metro station. Due to the hilly nature of the terrain, the Lianglukou metro station is at the top of the escalator while the Chongqing railway station is at the bottom.

There is a small charge for using the escalator, and it is monitored by a supervisor at each end. It takes 2.5 minutes for a passenger to finish a one-way trip on the escalator. The escalator plays a key role in the civil transportation of the mountainous city Chongqing.
