= Linjiangmen station =

Railway station in Chongqing, China

Coordinates: 29°33′30″N 106°34′25″E

Linjiangmen 临江门
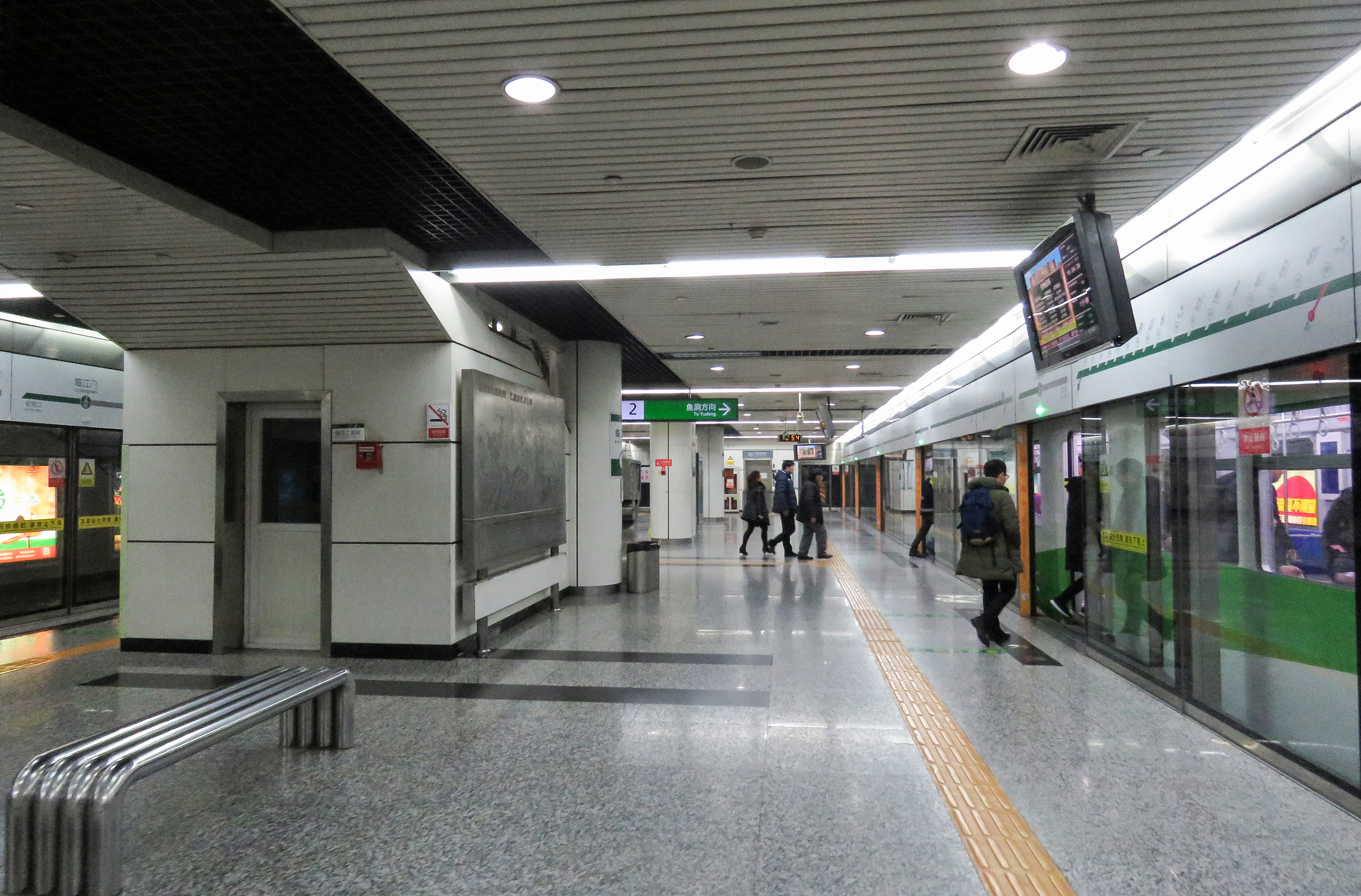

General information
- Location: Chongqing; China
- Operated by: Chongqing Rail Transit Corp., Ltd
- Line: Line 2
- Platforms: 2 (1 island platform)

Construction
- Structure type: Underground

Other information
- Station code: /

History
- Opened: 28 December 2004; 21 years ago

Services
Preceding station	Chongqing Rail Transit	Following station
Jiaochangkou Terminus	Line 2	Huanghuayuan towards Yudong
Location

Linjiangmen is a station on Line 2 of Chongqing Rail Transit in Chongqing Municipality, China. It is located in Yuzhong District. It was opened in 2004.

== Station structure ==
B1; Concourse	Exits, Customer service, Vending machines
B2; Platforms	Line 2 to Yudong (Huanghuayuan)
B2; Platforms	Island platform
B2; Platforms	Line 2 to Jiaochangkou (Terminus)
