= Qixinggang station =

Metro station in Chongqing, China

Qixinggang 七星岗
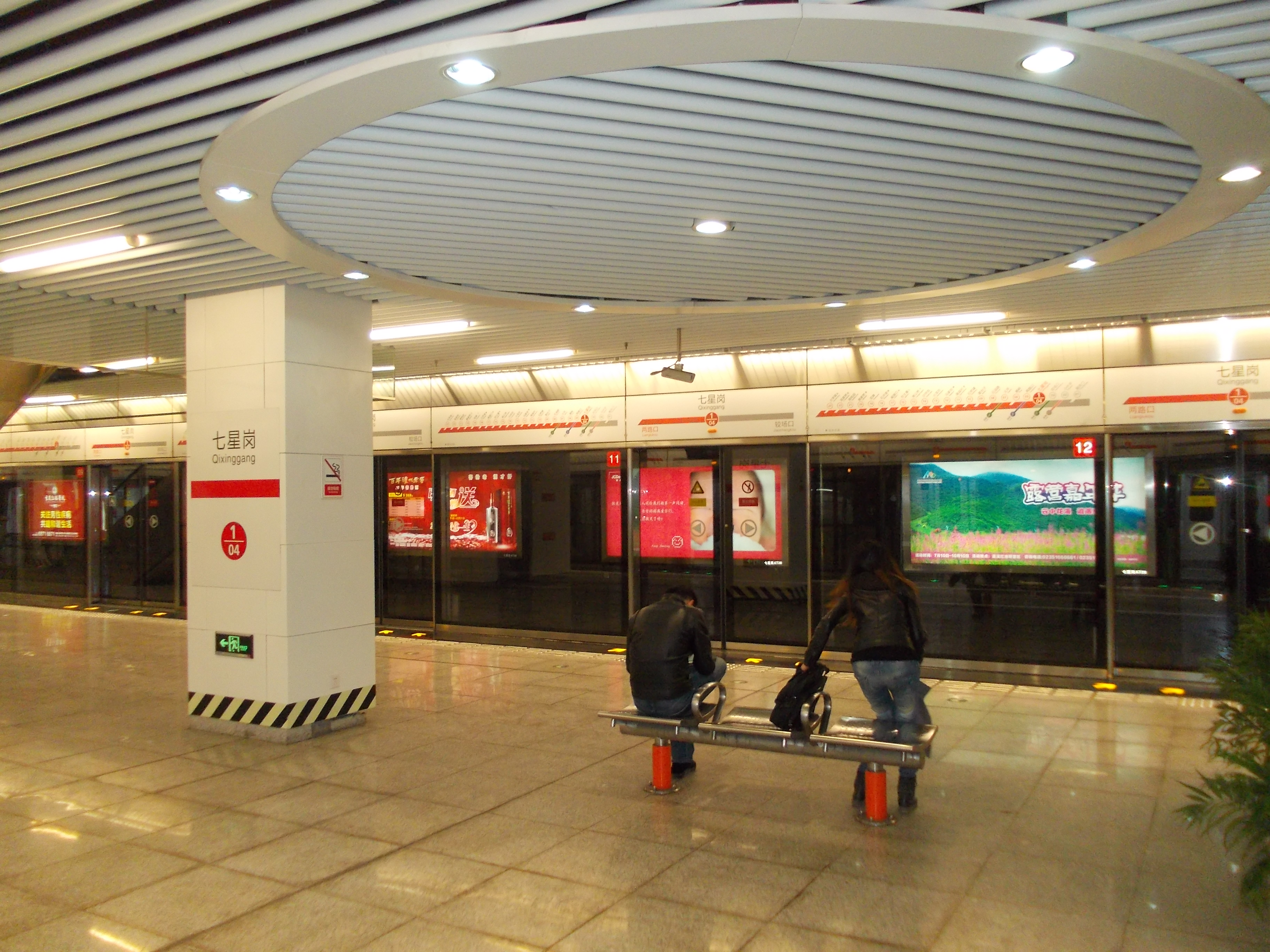

General information
- Location: Chongqing; China
- Coordinates: 29.557°N 106.5592°E
- Operated by: Chongqing Rail Transit Corp., Ltd
- Lines: Line 1 Line 10
- Platforms: 2 (1 island platform)

Construction
- Structure type: Underground

Other information
- Station code: / /

History
- Opened: 28 July 2011; 14 years ago (Line 1); 18 January 2023; 3 years ago (Line 10)

Services
Preceding station	Chongqing Rail Transit	Following station
Jiaochangkou towards Chaotianmen	Line 1	Lianglukou towards Bishan
Houbao towards Lanhualu	Line 10	Chongqing People's Auditorium towards Wangjiazhuang
Location

Qixinggang is a station on Line 1 and Line 10 of Chongqing Rail Transit in Chongqing Municipality, China. It is located in Yuzhong District. Line 1 opened in 2011 and Line 10 opened in 2023.

Line 18, under construction, will also serve the station in future.

== Station structure ==
B1; Concourse	Exits, Customer service, Vending machines
B2; Platforms	Line 1 to Bishan (Lianglukou)
B2; Platforms	Island platform
B2; Platforms	Line 1 to Chaotianmen (Jiaochangkou)
B2; Platforms	Line 10 to Lanhualu (Houbao)
B2; Platforms	Island platform
B2; Platforms	Line 10 to Wangjiazhuang (Chongqing People's Auditorium)
