= Bashu Secondary School =

- 巴蜀中学
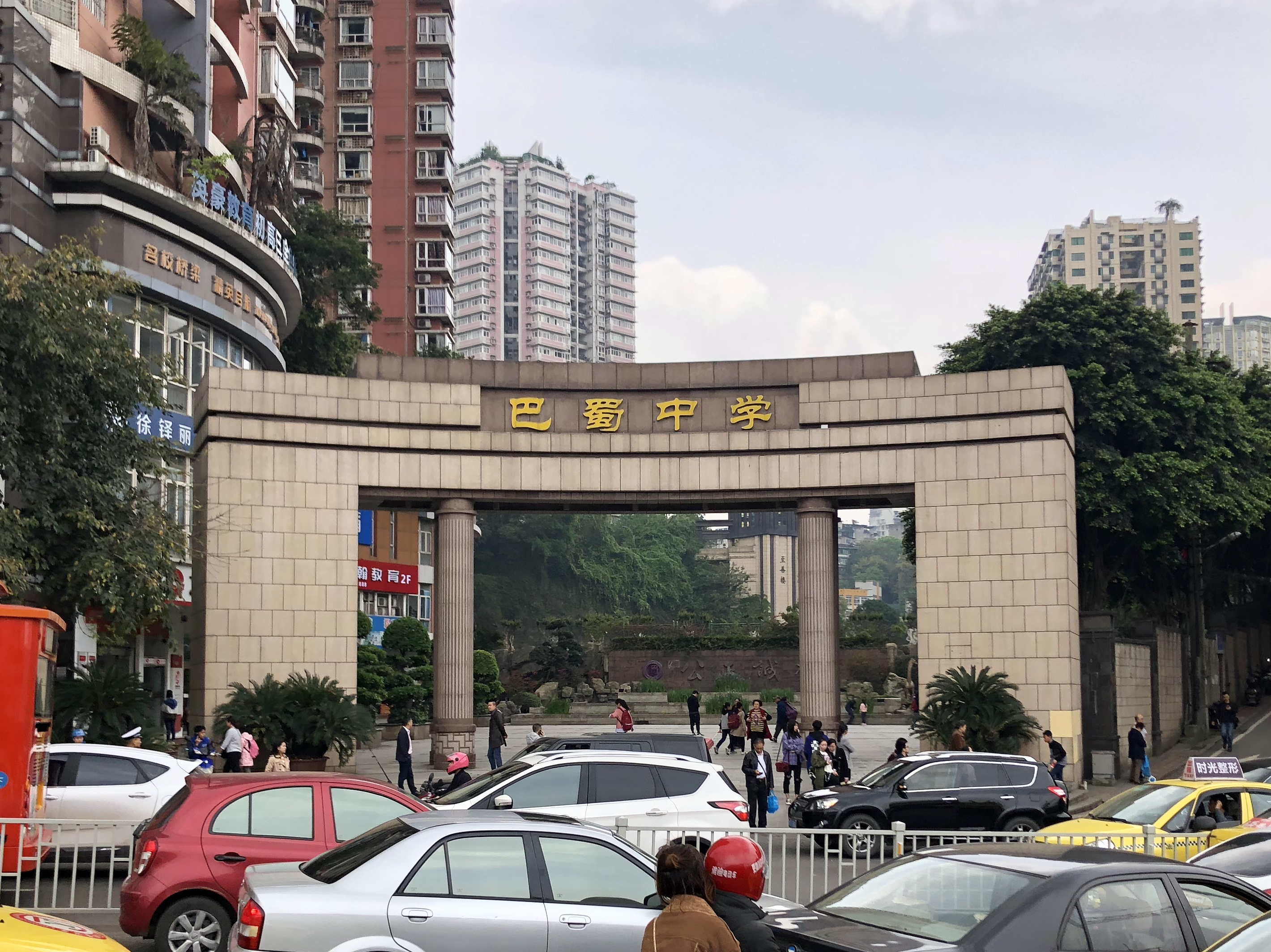
- Yuzhong District, Chongqing; China

Information
- Type: Public, College-prep, Day & Boarding
- Motto: Equality, Justice, Honesty, and Simplicity (公正诚朴)
- Established: 1933
- Principal: Li Xiaoke (李潇珂)
- Gender: Coeducational
- Enrollment: more than 10,000
- Language: Chinese and English
- Campus: Urban, 900 acres (3.6 km^{2})
- Colors: White & Violet
- Tuition: Free
- Branches: Yuzhong Main Campus, Luneng Campus, Jinke Campus, Longhu Campus, Yudong Campus, Fuling Campus, Liangjiang Campus, BI Academy
- Anthem: Song of Bashu
- Website: www.bashu.com.cn

Bashu Secondary School, formerly known as Bashu Middle School (巴蜀中学校) and Chongqing No.42 High School (重庆四十二中), is a high school with its main campus located in downtown Chongqing. It also has an affiliated junior high school located next to the main campus.

== History ==
In 1929, Wang Zuanxu, then a military official under Liu Xiang, purchased Zhang Family Garden, over 100 hectares on the south bank of the Jialing River in Chongqing, as the site for Bashu School. Wang, driven by the belief that education was the path to national rejuvenation, spent a few years planning and constructing the school, which was criticized by Liu for diverting focus and time. Wang tendered his resignation, which Liu rejected but decided thereafter not to interfere with Wang's educational efforts. In 1932, Bashu School was completed, and as a token of respect to Liu, Wang named the main campus Xiang Garden. Wang engaged renowned educators and figures, such as Sun Bocai, Ye Shengtao, Wei Chucai, and Lu Zuofu, in academic and administrative positions, with Zhou Xu being the first principal.

In 1933, the school opened with full funding from Wang. Originally as a primary school, Bashu opened its affiliated junior high school in 1936, and senior high and kindergarten in 1946. In 1950, following the founding of the People's Republic of China, the school was taken over by the Southwest Military and Political Commission and became a school for the children of cadres in the Southwest Bureau of the Central Committee of the CCP. After the Southwest Bureau was abolished in 1954, the school came under the Chongqing Education Bureau. In August 1955, the school was divided into three parts, and its middle school was renamed Chongqing No. 41 Middle School. In 1978, it was designated as one of the first key middle schools in Sichuan Province. In 1991, the school resumed the name of Bashu Secondary School.

== Reputation ==
Bashu is famous for its large scale and high-standard education. There are more than 10,000 students enrolled. The main campus is about 15 acres in area. Bashu is one of the best high schools in Chongqing, for its average scores in each year's National Higher Education Entrance Examination are higher than most other schools. Every year about 50 students are admitted by the two top universities in China, Tsinghua University and Peking University. Students are also admitted by some reputable universities overseas, especially in the US and the UK.

== Notable alumni ==
- Zou Jiahua——Former vice premier of China
- Yan Mingfu——Former vice president of Ministry of Civil Affairs
- Wu Jinglian——Economist
- Liu Yongqing——Former First Lady of China (Wife of Hu Jintao)
- Zhang Huanqiao——Nuclear scientist
- Wang Xiaotang——A famous actor
- Jiang Bibo——A famous painter
