= Yuzhong, Chongqing =

Yuzhong 渝中区
- District
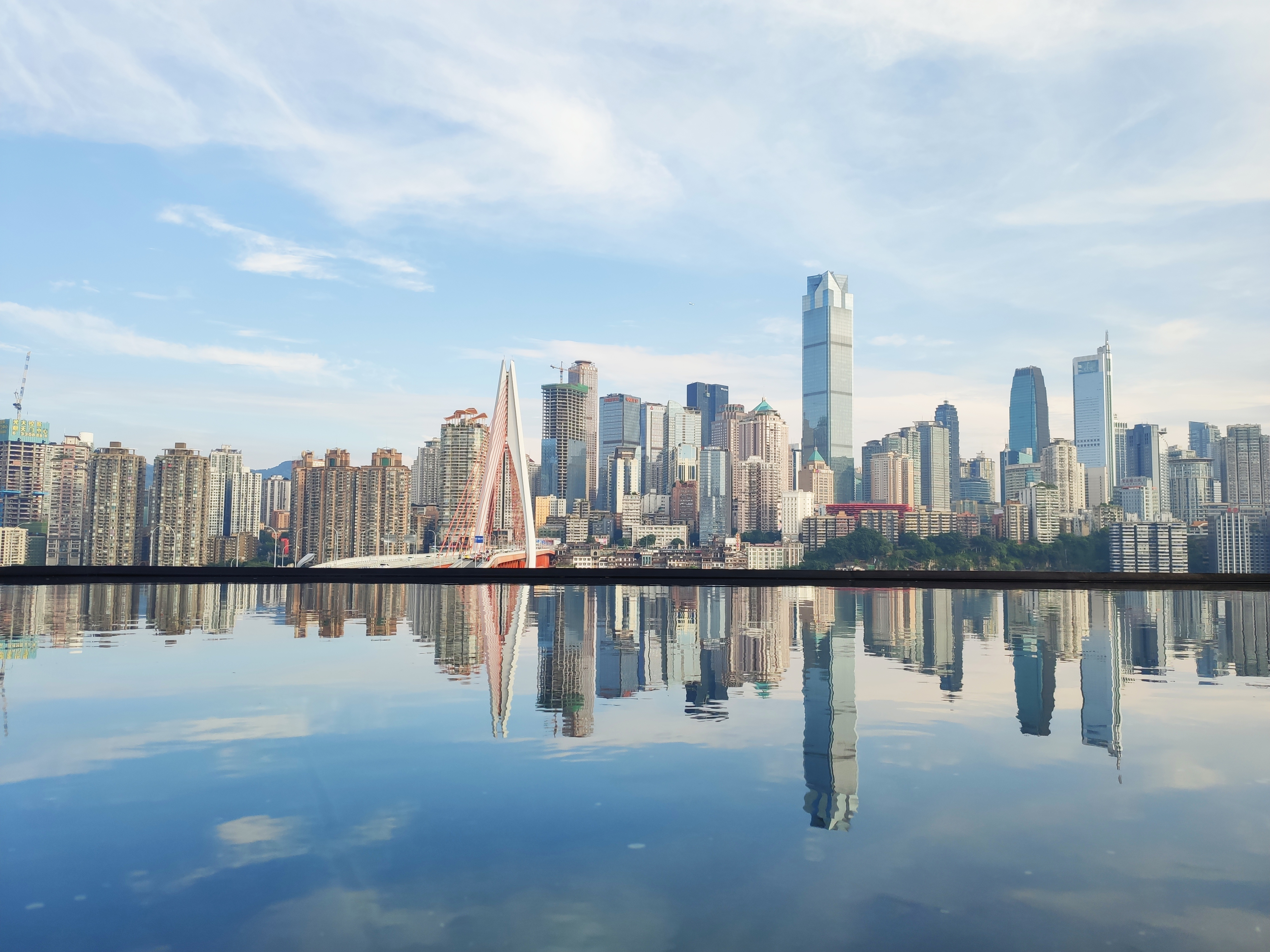
- Skyline of Yuzhong

- Yuzhong in Chongqing
- Coordinates: 29°33′38″N 106°34′24″E
- Country: People's Republic of China
- Municipality: Chongqing

Area
  - Total: 23 km^{2} (8.9 sq mi)

Population (2010)
  - Total: 630,090
  - Density: 27,395.22/km^{2} (70,953.3/sq mi)
- Time zone: UTC+8 (China Standard)

Yuzhong District (渝中区) is the central district and heart of Chongqing municipality. It is the capital of the municipality and is also the political, economical, and entertainment center of the city of Chongqing. Located in the central portion of Yuzhong is the Jiefangbei CBD, a leading business and financial center of western China.

Surrounded on three sides by water, Yuzhong is effectively a peninsula between the Jialing and Yangtze Rivers. Due to the limited space, its hilly nature, and the fact that it is the main central business district for Chongqing, Yuzhong contains some of the tallest skyscrapers in China and is the most densely populated district in the municipality.

During the Second Sino-Japanese War, the relocated headquarters of the Nationalist Government were located in Yuzhong.

== Administrative divisions ==
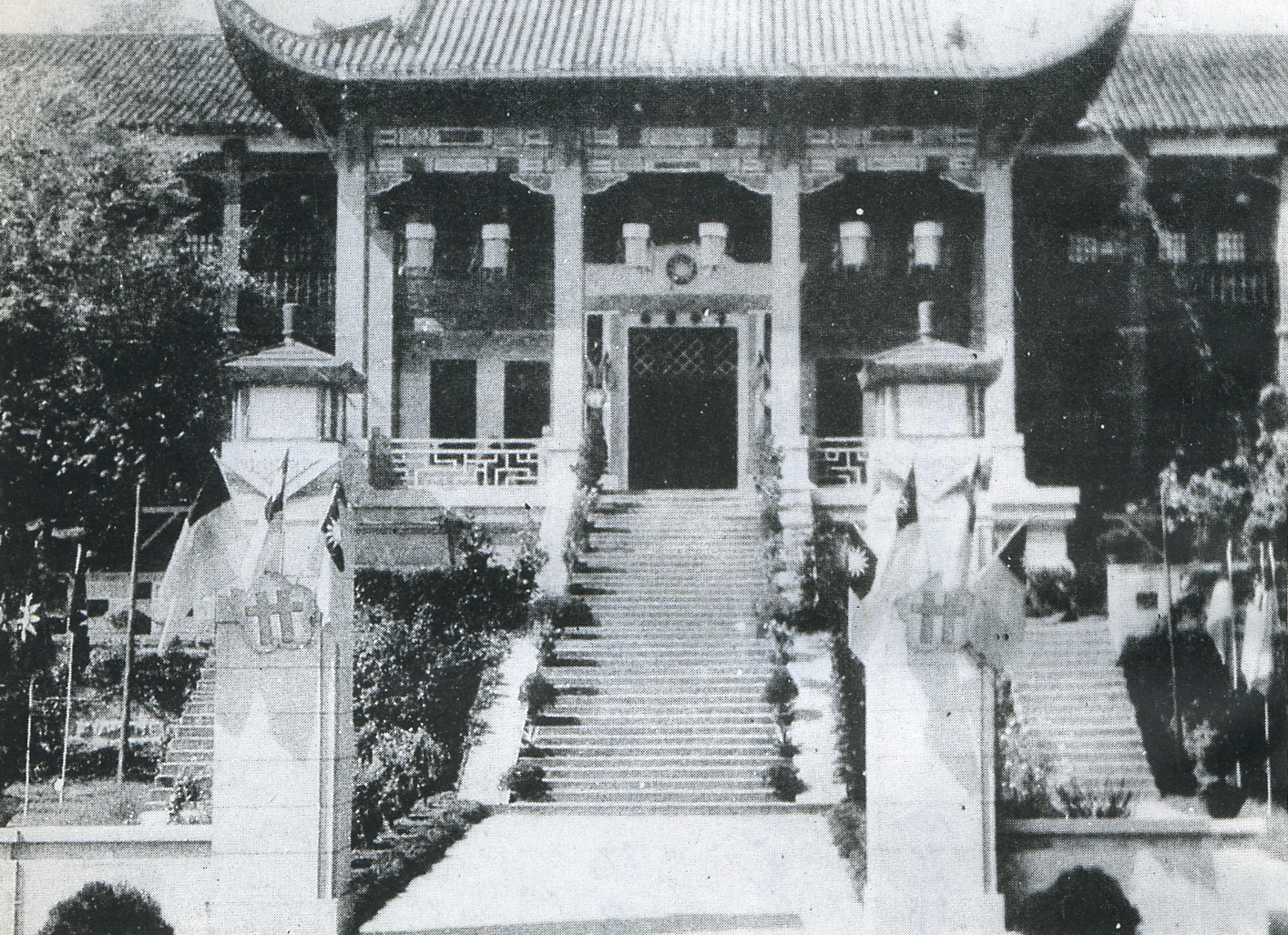
The former headquarters of the Nationalist Government in Chungking, building was demolished in 1980

Name	Chinese (S)	Hanyu Pinyin	Population (2010)	Area (km^{2})	Density (pop/area)
Qixinggang Subdistrict	七星岗街道	Qīxīnggǎng Jiēdào	68,872	0.75	91829.33
Jiefangbei Subdistrict	解放碑街道	Jiěfàngbēi Jiēdào	64,629	0.62	104341.93
Lianglukou Subdistrict	两路口街道	Liǎnglùkǒu Jiēdào	51,811	0.67	77329.85
Shangqingsi Subdistrict	上清寺街道	Shàngqīngsì Jiēdào	55,903	1.73	32313.87
Caiyuanba Subdistrict	菜园坝街道	Càiyuánbà Jiēdào	38,380	1.56	24602.56
Nanjimen Subdistrict	南纪门街道	Nánjìmén Jiēdào	46,862	0.53	88418.87
Wanglongmen Subdistrict	望龙门街道	Wànglóngmén Jiēdào	41,358	0.56	73853.57
Chaotianmen Subdistrict	朝天门街道	Cháotiānmén Jiēdào	27,338	0.69	39620.29
Daxigou Subdistrict	大溪沟街道	Dàxīgōu Jiēdào	66,319	1.44	46054.86
Daping Subdistrict	大坪街道	Dàpíng Jiēdào	81,658	3.24	25203.09
Hualongqiao Subdistrict	化龙桥街道	Huàlóngqiáo Jiēdào	15,806	4.76	3320.59
Shiyoulu Subdistrict	石油路街道	Shíyóulù Jiēdào	71,154	2.52	28235.71

== Economy ==
Yuzhong District is the economic center of Chongqing. In 2015, the region's GDP reached 95.8 billion Yuan, the per capita GDP reached 147,524 Yuan, and retail sales reached 141.6 billion Yuan. The number of commercial banks in the district and municipal financial institutions reached 18, including HSBC, Standard Chartered, and Bank of East Asia. The largest western China commercial area, Jiefangbei central business district, has brought together 90 percent of the domestic financial institutions in Chongqing, as well as two-thirds of Chongqing's foreign banks and insurance agencies. Three-quarters of the world's top 500 enterprises in Chongqing and many foreign consular offices are also located here.

== Education ==
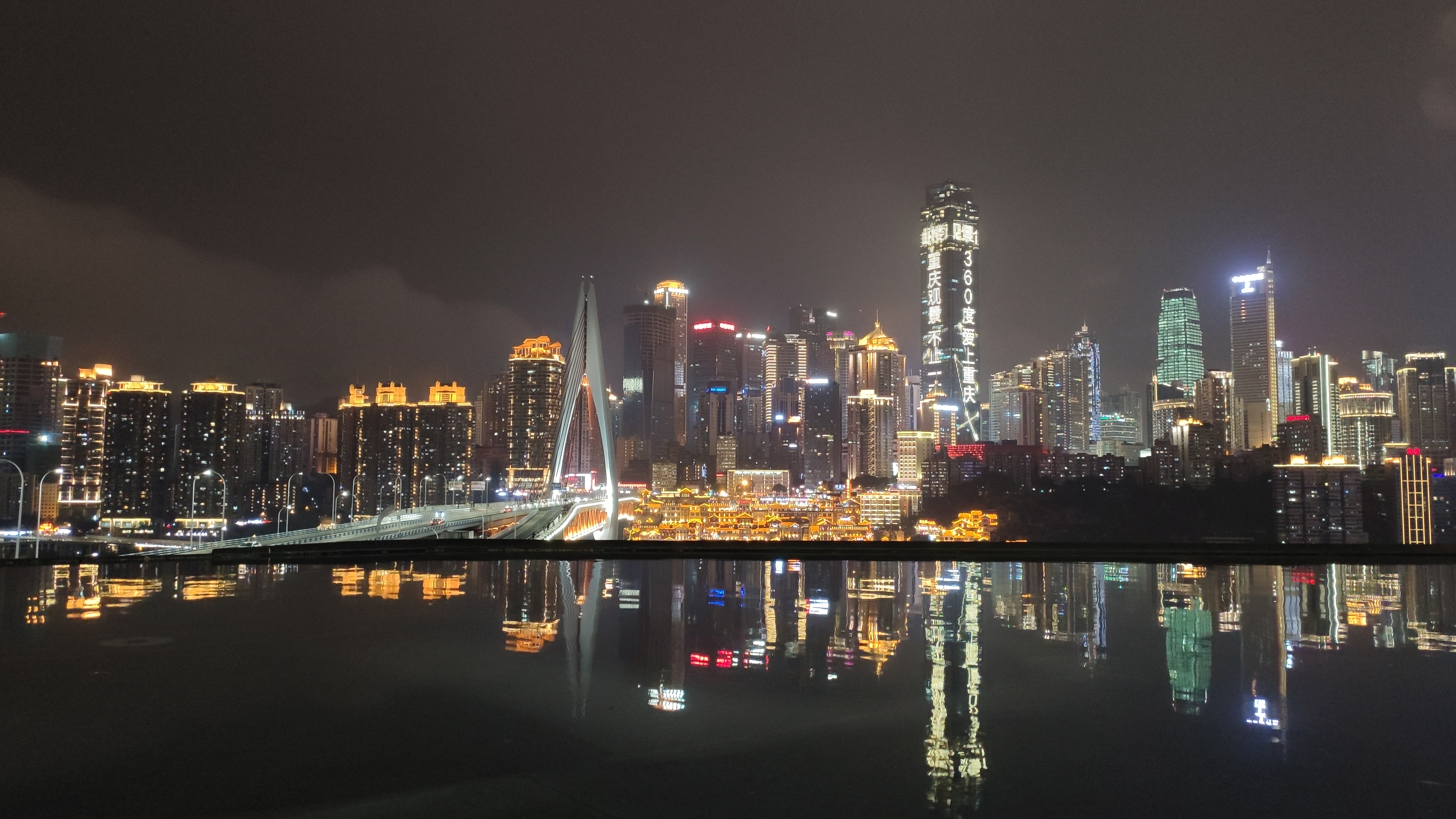
Jiangbei District looking at Yuzhong District Peninsula (night view)

Chongqing Bashu Secondary School, once called Bashu Middle School (巴蜀中学) is a secondary school located in the Huanghuayuan area. Founded in 1933, it educates students aged 12–18. Its motto is 公正诚朴 (Selflessness, Justice, Honesty, and Simplicity).

== Transport ==
=== Metro ===
Yuzhong is currently served by four metro lines operated by Chongqing Rail Transit:

- Line 1 - Xiaoshizi, Jiaochangkou, Qixinggang, Lianglukou, Eling, Daping, Shiyoulu
- Line 2 - Jiaochangkou, Linjiangmen, Huanghuayuan, Daxigou, Zengjiayan, Niujiaotuo, Liziba, Fotuguan, Daping
- Line 3 - Lianglukou, Niujiaotuo
- Line 6 - Xiaoshizi
