= Lujiaqiao station =

Metro station in Chengdu, China

Lujiaqiao 陆家桥

General information
- Location: Jinniu District, Chengdu, Sichuan; China
- Operated by: Chengdu Metro Limited
- Line: Line 5
- Platforms: 2 (1 island platform)

Other information
- Station code: 0511

History
- Opened: 27 December 2019

Services
Preceding station	Chengdu Metro	Following station
Huanghuayuan towards Huagui Road	Line 5	Quanshui Road towards Huilong
Location

Lujiaqiao (Chinese: 陆家桥) is a station on Line 5 of the Chengdu Metro in China. It was opened on 27 December 2019.
