= Line 2 (Chongqing Rail Transit) =

Monorail line of Chongqing Rail Transit

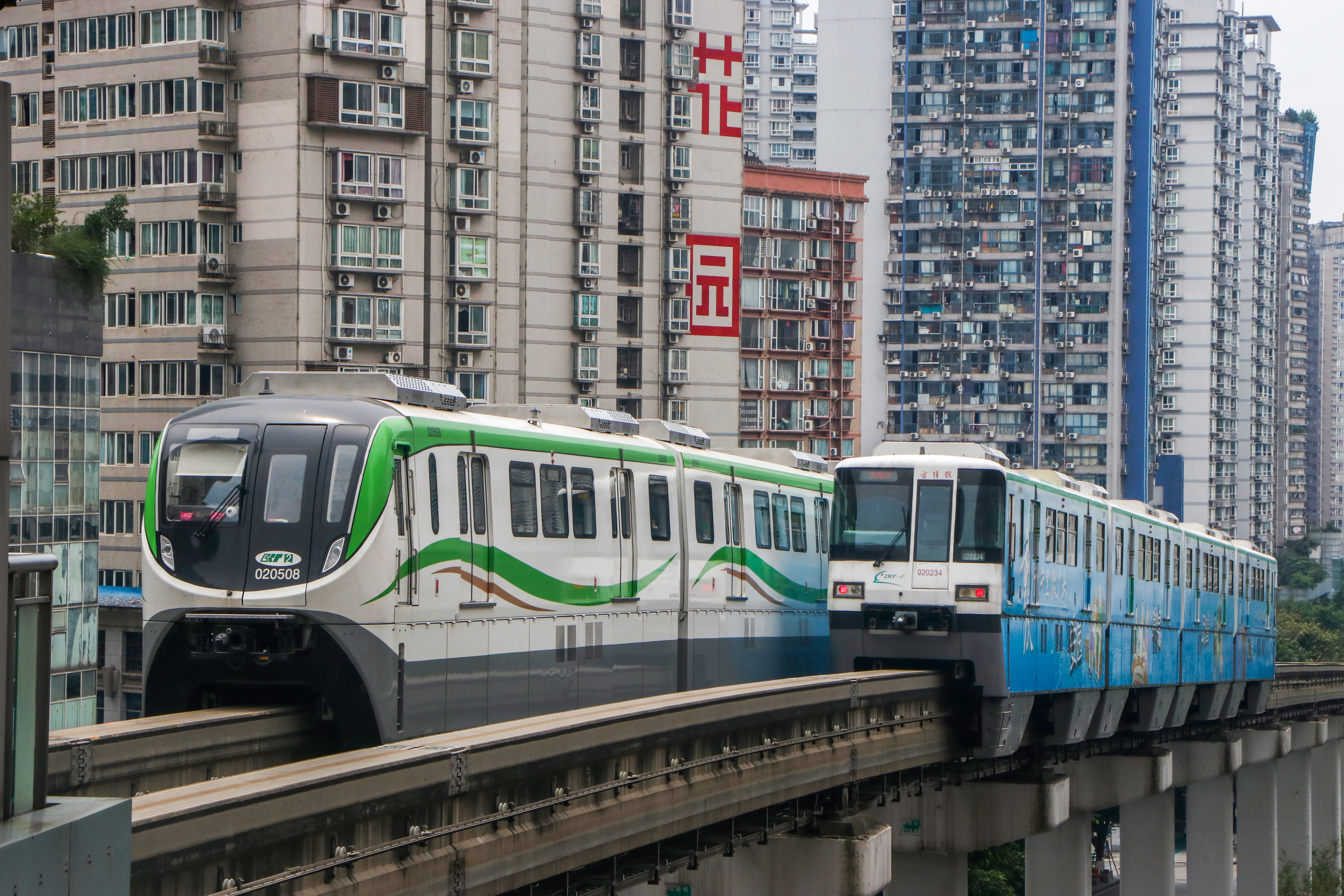
- New 8-car train and older 4-car train at Yangjiaping Station

Overview
- Termini: Jiaochangkou; Yudong
- Stations: 25

Service
- Type: Straddle-beam monorail rapid transit
- System: Chongqing Rail Transit
- Operator(s): Chongqing Rail Transit Corp., Ltd
- Rolling stock: Changchun Hitachi Monorail QKZ2, CCD
- Daily ridership: 234,200 (2014 Daily Avg.); 350,000 (2016 Peak)

History
- Opened: 6 November 2004; 22 years ago

Technical
- Line length: 31.3 km (19.4 mi)
- Electrification: 1,500 V DC third rail
- Operating speed: 75 km/h (47 mph)

The former logo of Line 2, which bears resemblance to Happy Mac

Line 2 of CRT runs southeastward from Jiaochangkou to Yudong. Line 2 began operation as the first metro line in the West of China on 18 June 2005. It was subsequently expanded 1 June 2006 from Zoo to Xinshancun, and on 30 December 2014 to Yudong. The line was China's first heavy monorail line, built using Japan's ODA and Hitachi Monorail technology.

Line 2, which currently runs 29.9 km (18.6 mi) and services 25 stations, begins as a subway under downtown Jiefangbei, then runs west along the southern bank of the Jialing River on an elevated line, and then turns south into the city's southwestern inner suburbs, looping back east to terminate at Yudong in Ba'nan.

== Rolling stock ==
=== QKZ2 ===
As the first heavy monorail system in China, the original rolling stock, named QKZ2, was identical to Osaka Monorail 2000 series. These trains were introduced in 2004.

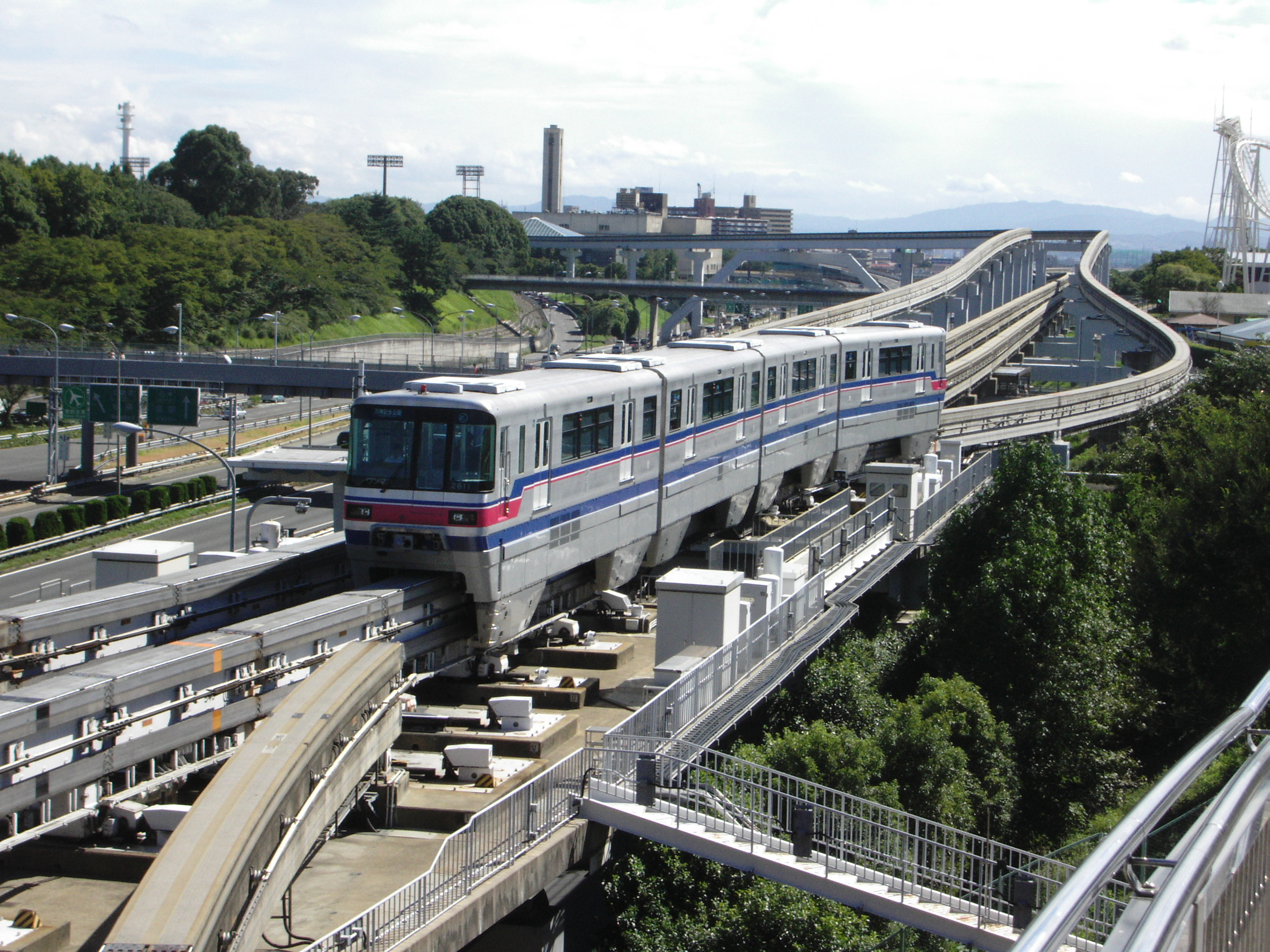
An Osaka Monorail 2000 series train, identical to the QKZ2 rolling stock originally used.

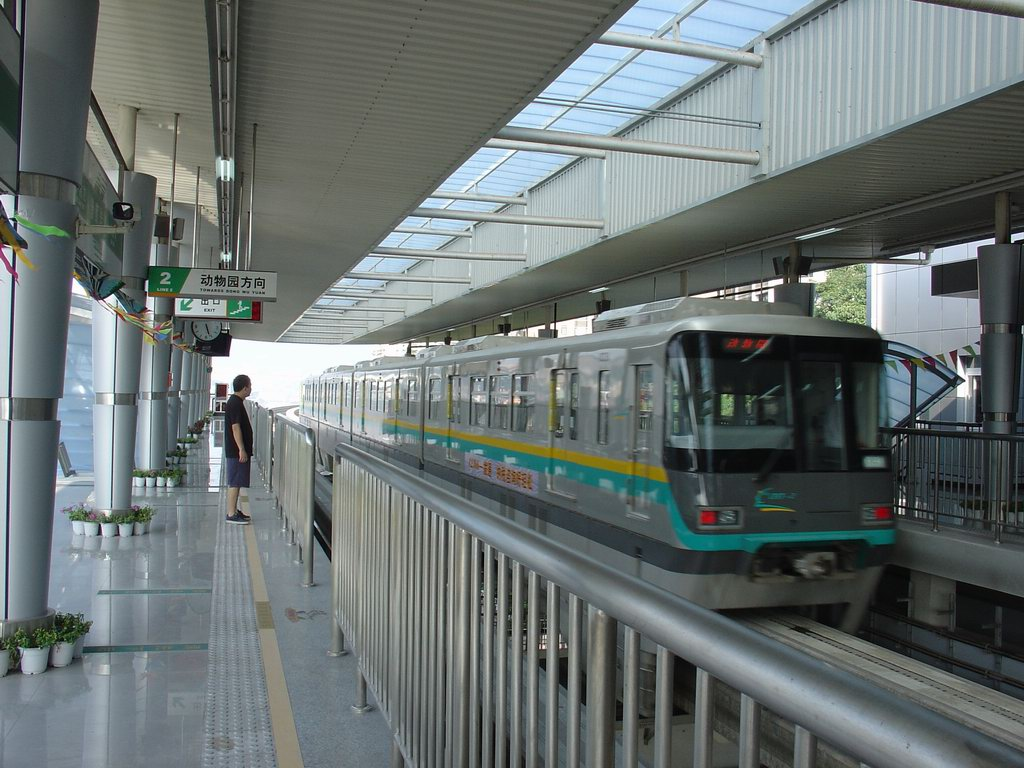
QKZ2 at Yangjiaping Station

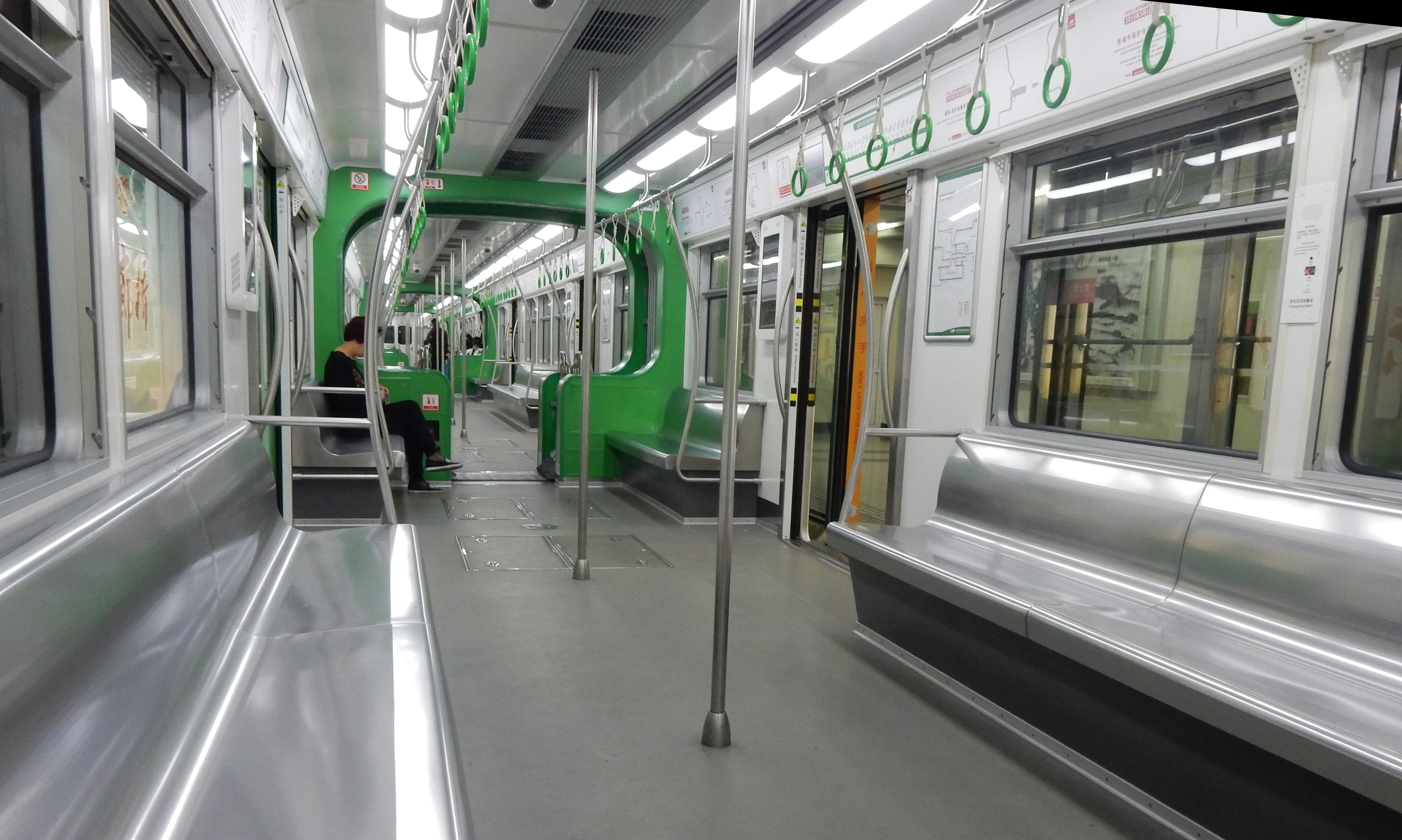
Interior of a Line 2 train

=== CCD ===
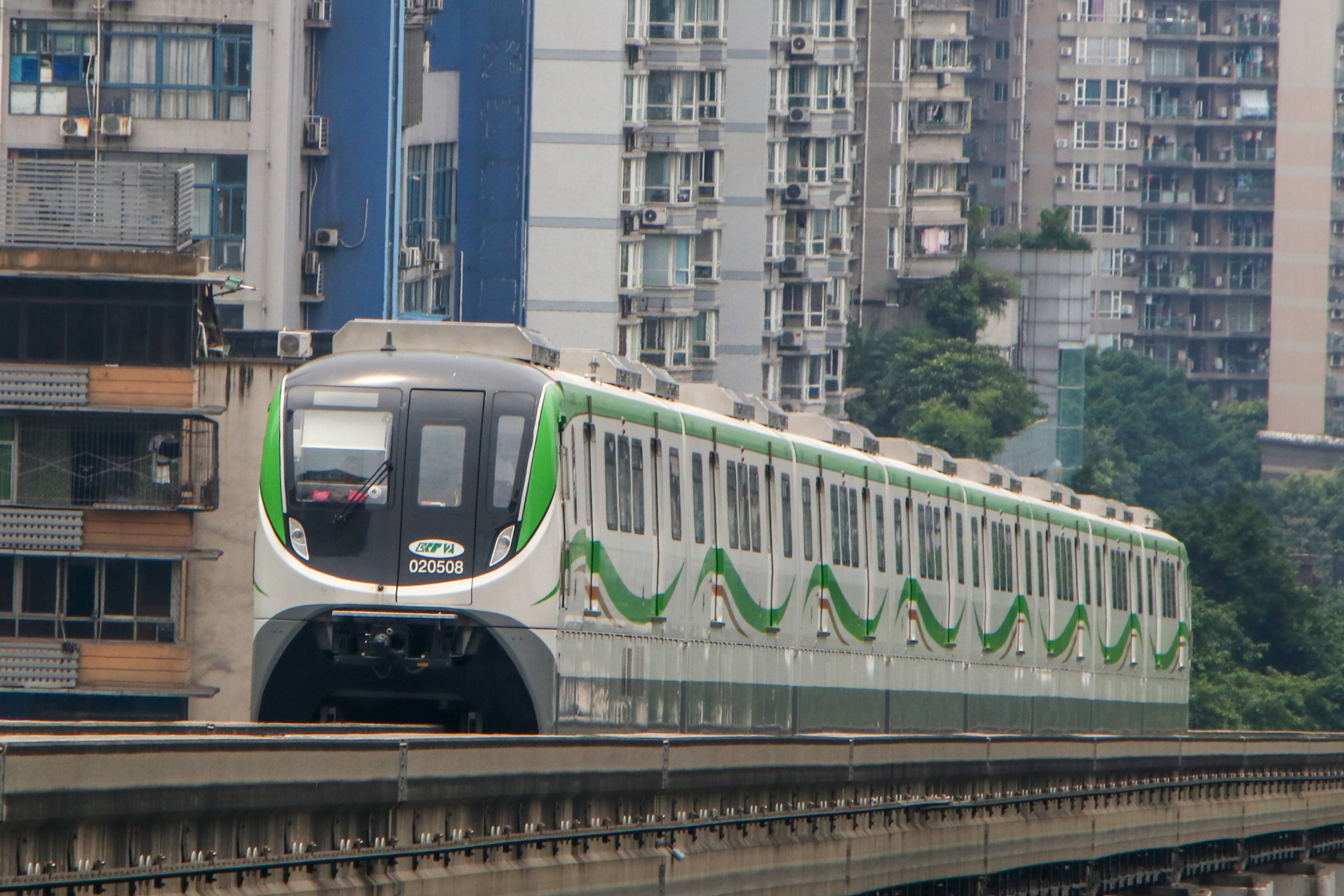
A 8-car train in Yangjiaping Station

Domestically-produced CCD series trains are available in 8-car trainsets, replacing earlier 4-car trainsets. The top speed is 80 kilometres per hour (50 mph) and maximum capacity is 1802 passengers. The exterior features a streamlined design with a two-tone color scheme inspired by the scenery in Chongqing.

The interior features 43.1 inches (109 cm) animated displays and LED scrolling displays, showing information such as the map and the current stop.

The trains support automatic train operation.

== Opening timeline ==
Segment	Commencement	Length	Station(s)	Name
Daping – Chongqing Zoo	6 November 2004	4.95 km (3.08 mi)	5	Phase 1 (initial section)
Jiaochangkou – Daping	11 December 2004	7.66 km (4.76 mi)	3	Phase 1 (final section)
Linjiangmen, Niujiaotuo, Liziba	28 December 2004	Infill stations	3	
Fotuguan	9 April 2005	Infill station	1	
Zengjiayan	15 June 2005	Infill station	1	
Chongqing Zoo – Xinshancun	1 July 2006	5.54 km (3.44 mi)	5	Phase 2
Xinshancun – Yudong	30 December 2014	13.15 km (8.17 mi)	7	Southern extension

== Service routes ==
Route of Line 2

- Jiaochangkou – Tiantangbao (8 car route)
- Jiaochangkou – Yudong

== Current stations ==
Service routes		Station №	Station name		Connections	Distance km		Location
Service routes		Station №	English	Chinese	Connections	Distance km		Location
●	●	/	Jiaochangkou	较场口	Line 1	-	0.00	Yuzhong
●	●	/	Linjiangmen	临江门		0.70	0.70	Yuzhong
●	●	/	Huanghuayuan	黄花园		1.20	1.90	Yuzhong
●	●	/	Daxigou	大溪沟		0.70	2.60	Yuzhong
●	●	/	Zengjiayan	曾家岩	Line 10	0.80	3.40	Yuzhong
●	●	/	Niujiaotuo	牛角沱	Line 3	1.05	4.45	Yuzhong
●	●	/	Liziba	李子坝		1.00	5.45	Yuzhong
●	●	/	Fotuguan	佛图关		0.70	6.15	Yuzhong
●	●	/	Daping	大坪	Line 1	1.60	7.75	Yuzhong
●	●	/	Yuanjiagang	袁家岗		1.60	9.35	Jiulongpo
●	●	/	Xiejiawan	谢家湾	Loop line	1.20	10.55	Jiulongpo
●	●	/	Yangjiaping	杨家坪	Line 18 (Note: Out of system transfer)	1.30	11.85	Jiulongpo
●	●	/	Zoo	动物园		1.00	12.85	Jiulongpo
●	●	/	Dayancun	大堰村		1.05	13.90	Jiulongpo
●	●	/	Mawangchang	马王场		1.15	15.05	Jiulongpo
●	●	/	Ping'an	平安		1.05	16.10	Dadukou
●	●	/	Dadukou	大渡口		1.10	17.20	Dadukou
●	●	/	Xinshancun	新山村		1.20	18.40	Dadukou
●	●	/	Tiantangbao	天堂堡		0.75	19.15	Dadukou
●		/	Jianqiao	建桥		1.90	21.05	Dadukou
●		/	Jinjiawan	金家湾		1.30	22.35	Dadukou
●		/	Liujiaba	刘家坝		1.35	23.70	Dadukou
●		/	Baijusi	白居寺	Line 18	1.70	25.40	Dadukou
●		/	Dajiang	大江		3.70	29.10	Banan
●		/	Yudong	鱼洞	Line 3	1.20	30.30	Banan
