= Chongqing Amusement Park =

Amusement park in Chongqing, China

- Type: Urban park, Amusement park
- Location: Nan'an District, Chongqing, China
- Area: 32 hectares (79 acres)
- Created: 1991 (as Chongqing Popular Science Center); 2002 (as Chongqing Amusement Park)
- Status: Open all year

Chongqing Amusement Park (Chinese: 重庆游乐园; pinyin: Chóngqìng Yóulèyuán), formerly known as Chongqing Popular Science Center (Chinese: 重庆科普中心; pinyin: Chóngqìng Kēpǔ Zhōngxīn), is the largest amusement park in Nan'an District, Chongqing, in southwestern China. The park was created in 1991. It cost the Chongqing government about 100 million RMB to construct facilities and import some amusement facilities from Russia and Japan. The park is located on top of a hill on the southern bank of the Yangtze River, near the southern end of Shibanpo Yangtze River Bridge. The ferris wheel, constructed in 1991 and renovated in 2007, stands on the hill and has become one of the landmarks of Nan'an District of Chongqing.
