= Osaka Monorail 2000 series =

Japanese monorail train type

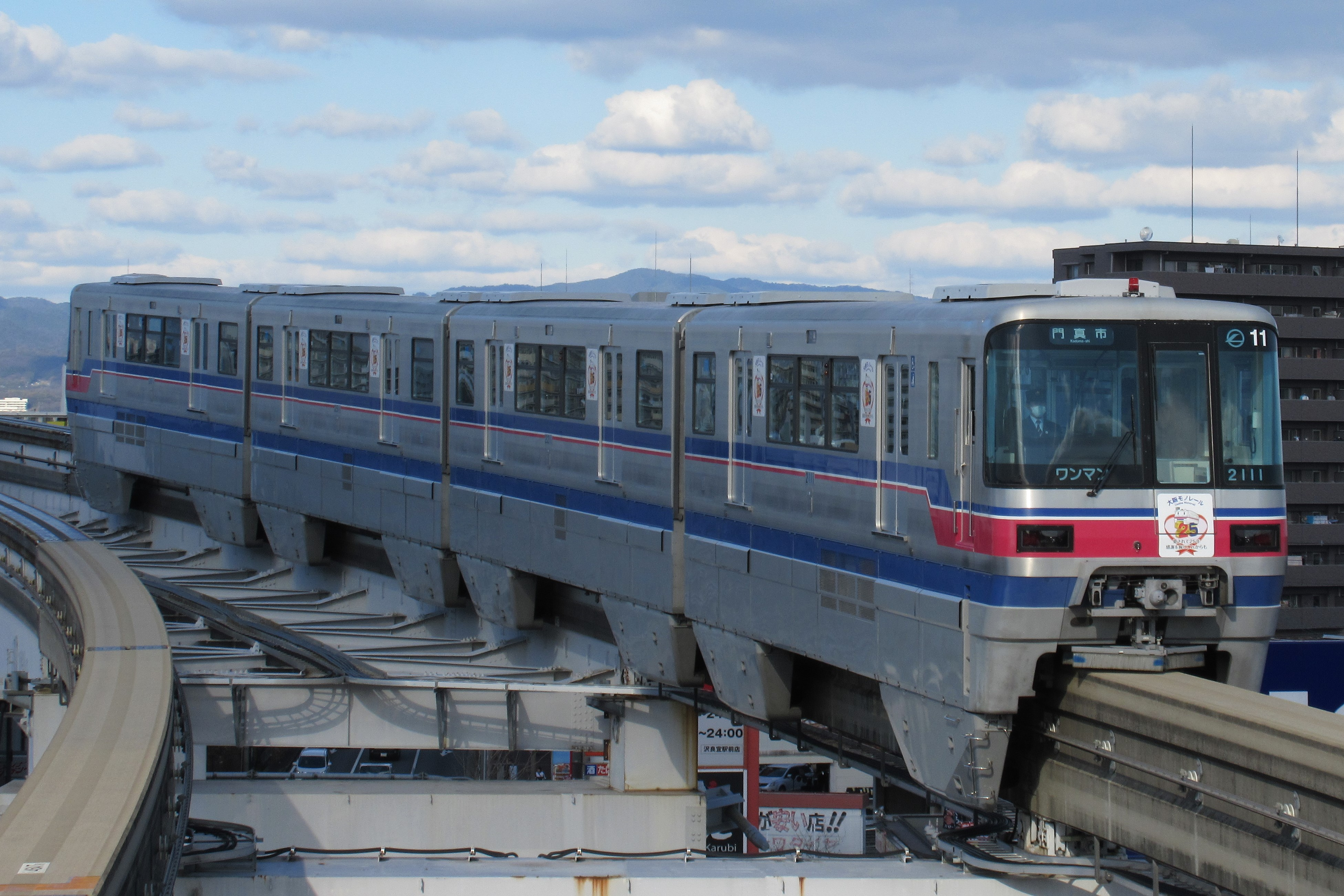
- 2000 series train
- In service: 2001–Present
- Manufacturer: Hitachi (sets 11-14, 17, 18); Kawasaki Heavy Industries (sets 15, 16)
- Built at: Kudamatsu (sets 11-14, 17, 18); Kobe (sets 15, 16)
- Constructed: 2001, 2005–2007, 2009
- Number built: 32 vehicles (8 sets)
- Number in service: 32 vehicles (8 sets)
- Formation: 4 cars per trainset
- Capacity: 410
- Operators: Osaka Monorail

Specifications
- Car body construction: Aluminium alloy
- Doors: 2 pairs per side
- Maximum speed: 75 km/h (47 mph)
- Traction system: IGBT-VVVF
- Traction motors: 16 × 100 kW (134 hp) 3-phase AC squirrel-cage induction motor
- Power output: 1.6 MW (2,146 hp)
- Acceleration: 0.83 m/s^{2} (1.9 mph/s)
- Deceleration: 1.1 m/s^{2} (2.5 mph/s)
- Electric system(s): 1,500 V DC
- Braking system(s): Regenerative brake, electronically controlled pneumatic brakes
- Safety system(s): ATC

The 2000 series (2000系) is a type of monorail train which has operated on the Osaka Monorail since 2001. The trains are built by Hitachi, Ltd. and Kawasaki Heavy Industries, have aluminium bodies, and operate as four-car formations.

== Build details ==
Set No.	Manufacturer	Date delivered
11	Hitachi	2001
12	Hitachi	2005
13	Hitachi	2006
14	Hitachi	2006
15	Kawasaki Heavy Industries	2006
16	Kawasaki Heavy Industries	2006
17	Hitachi	2007
18	Hitachi	2009

== Interior ==
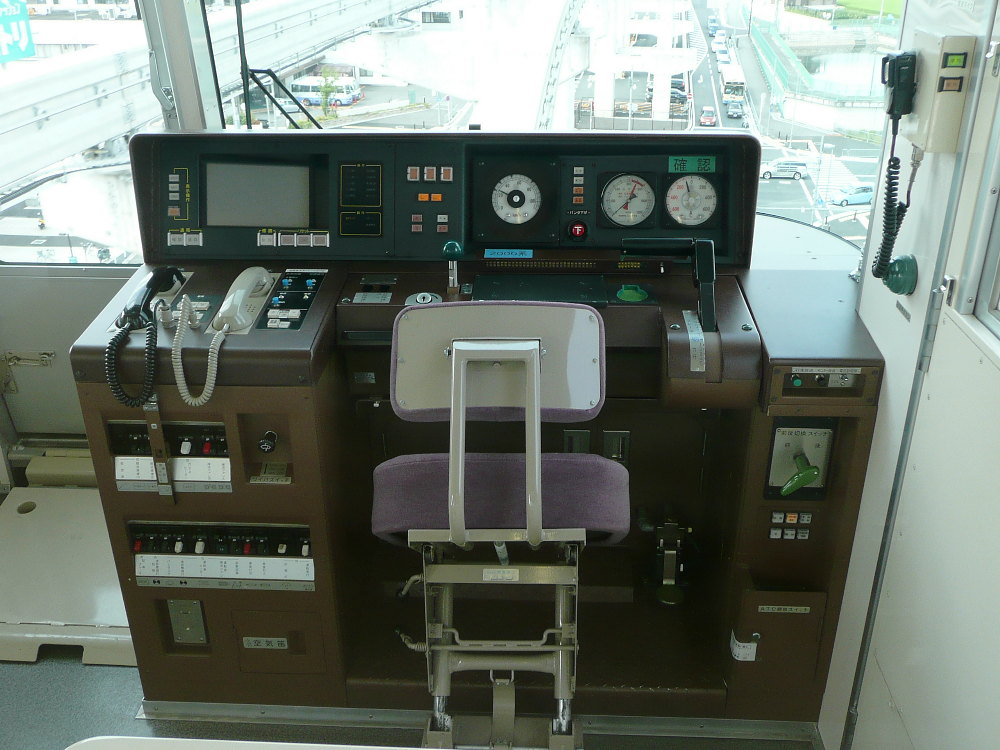
Driver's cab

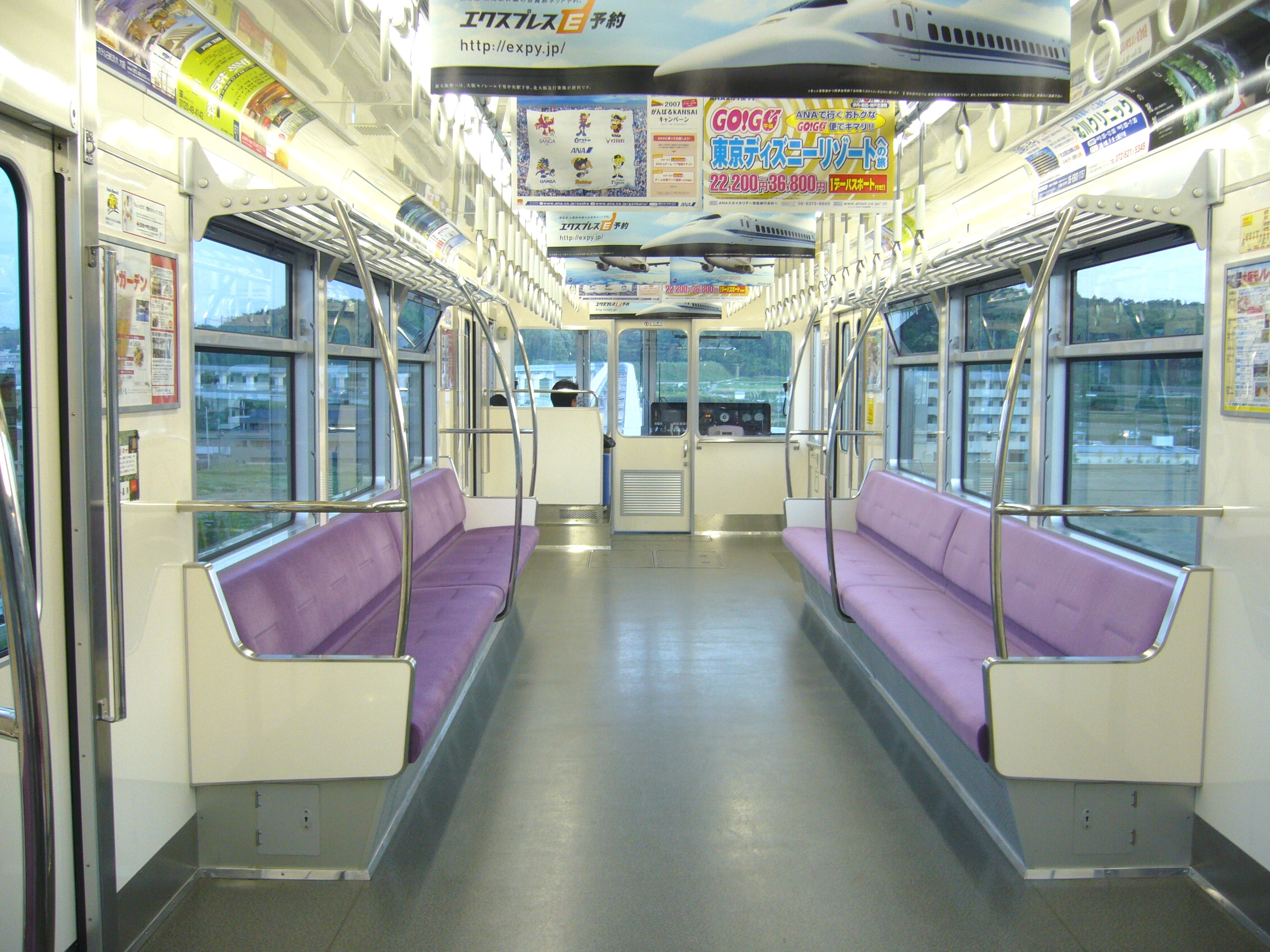
Interior view

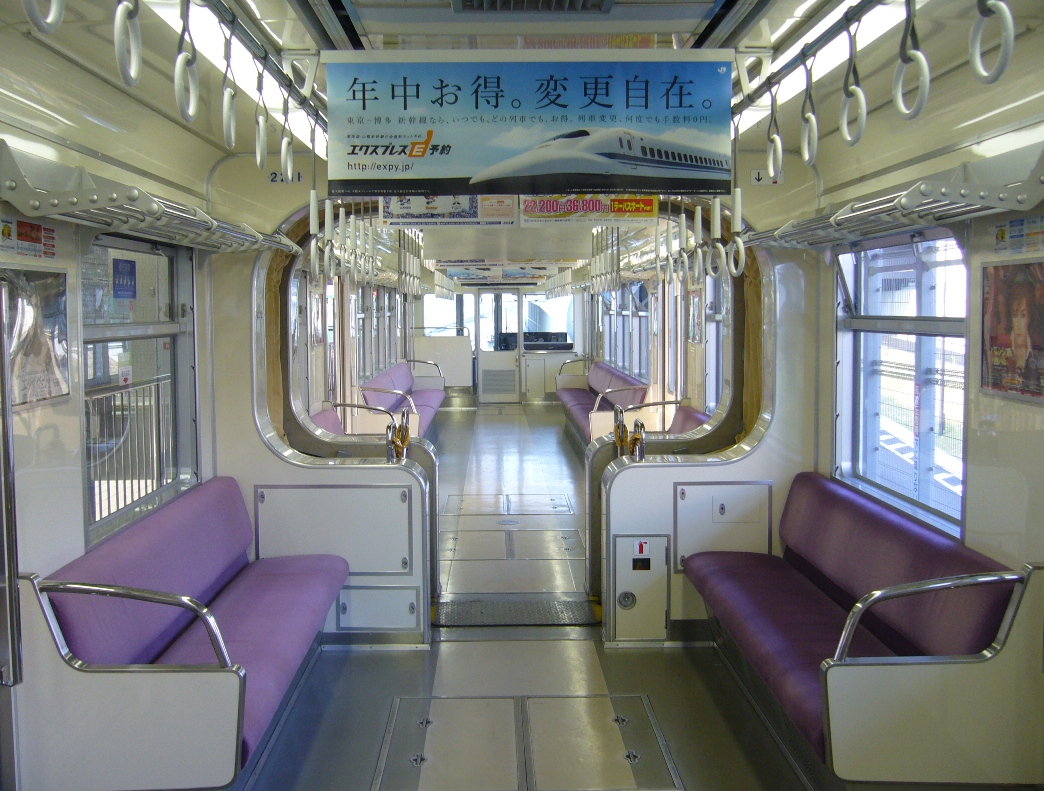
Priority seating

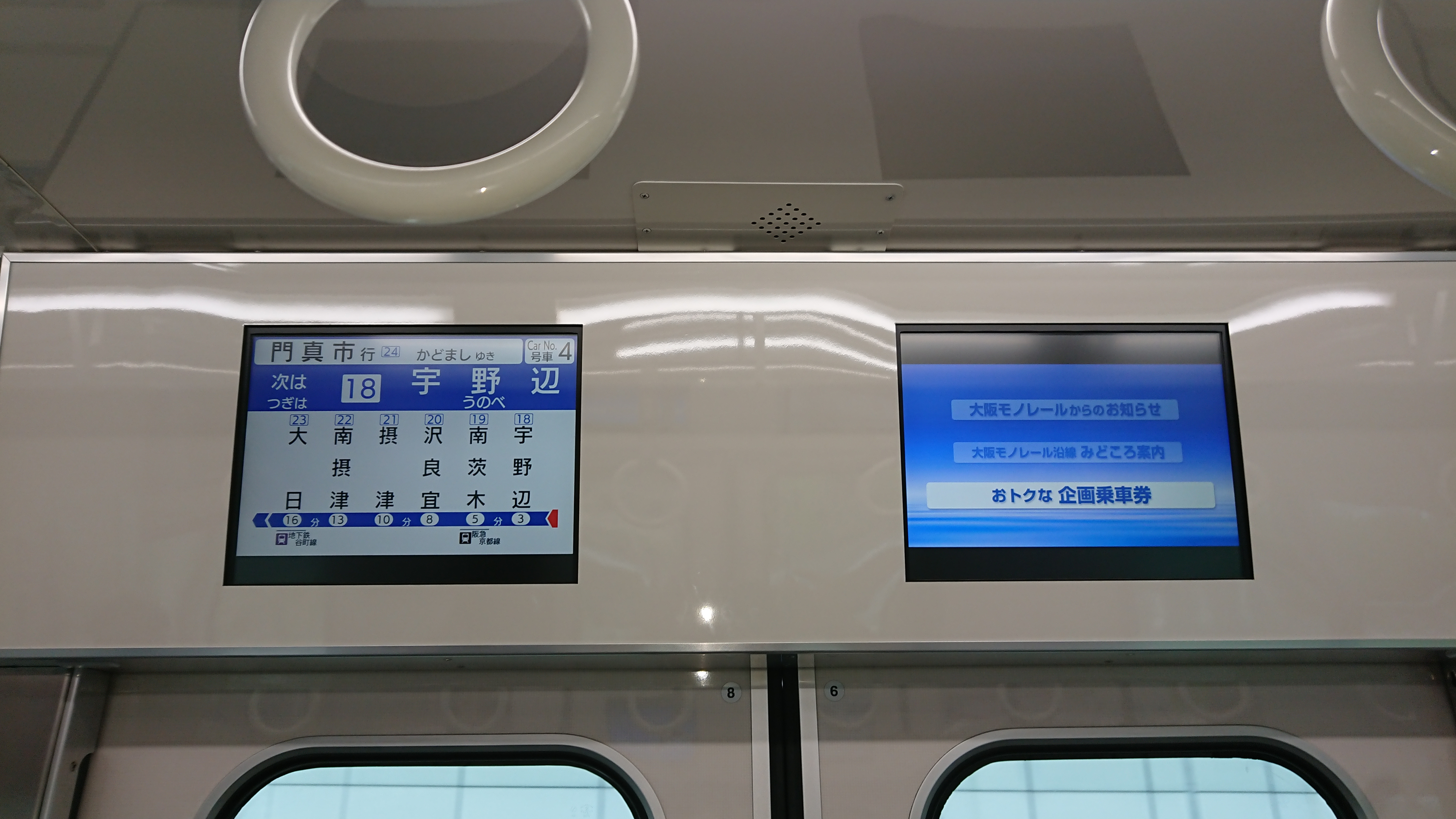
LCD passenger information display

== Special liveries ==
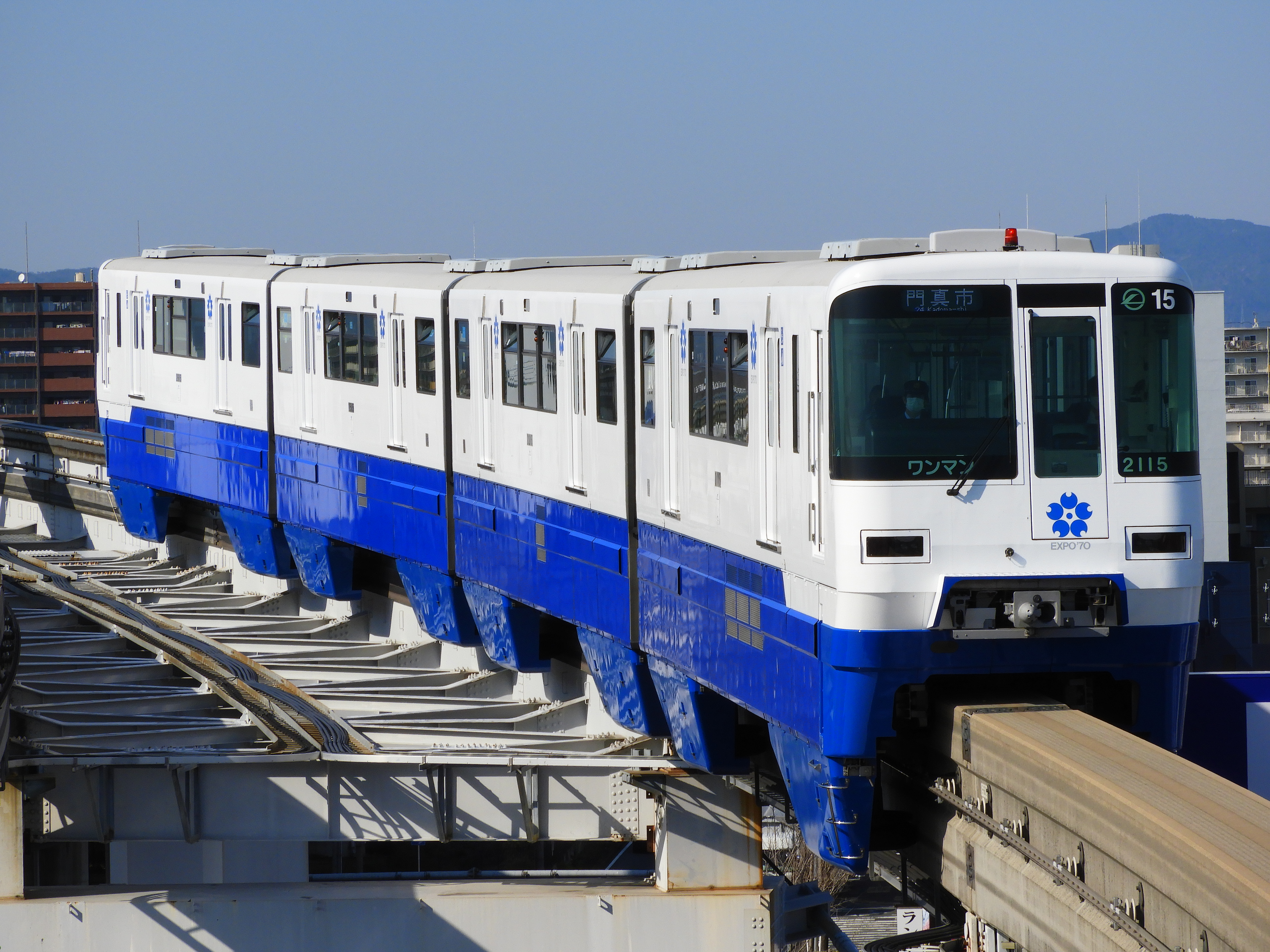
Expo '70 50th anniversary livery
