= Yudong Yangtze River Bridge =

Yudong Bridge 鱼洞长江大桥
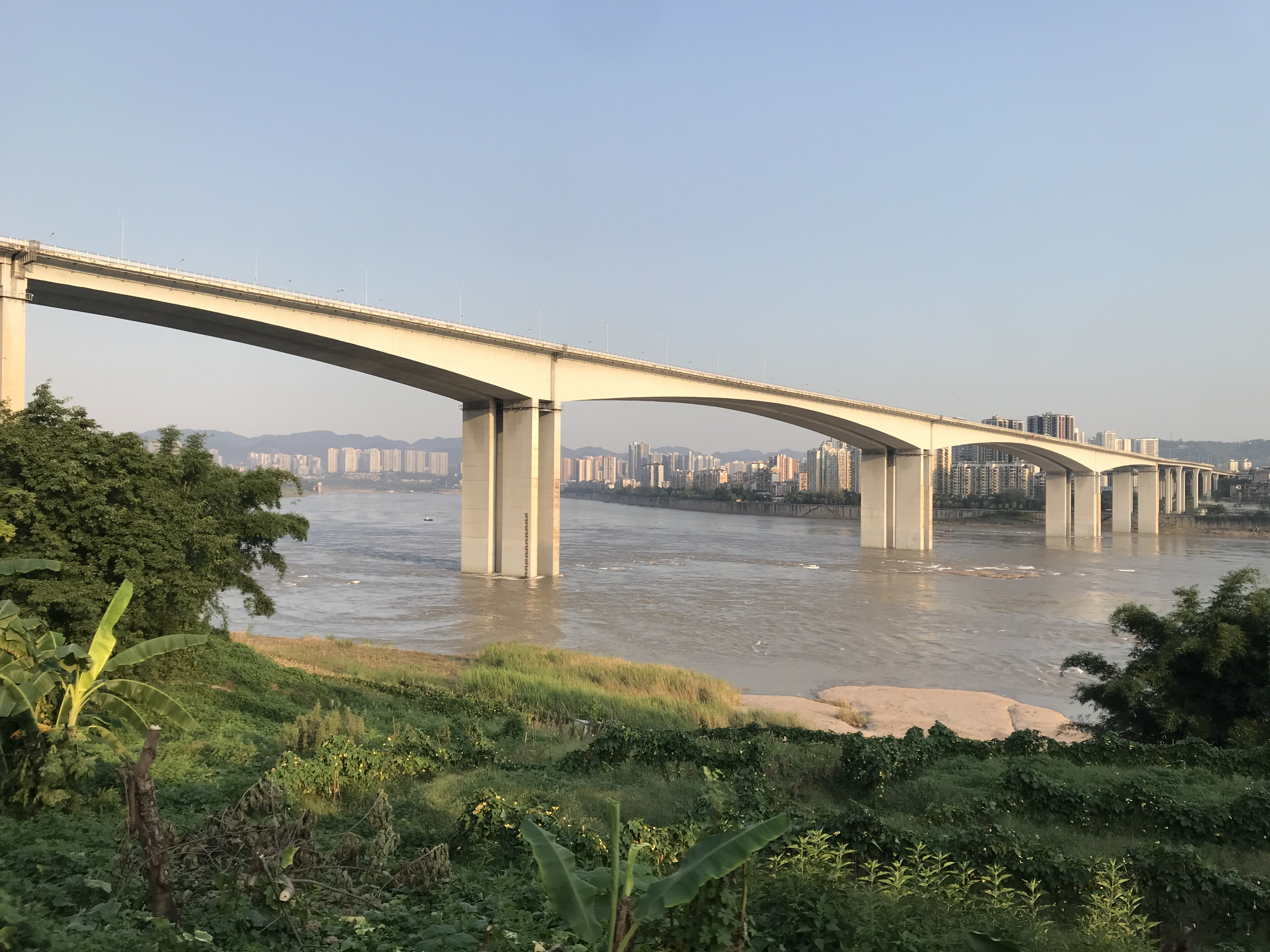
- Coordinates: 29.402556°N 106.496611°E
- Carries: 6 lane road
- Crosses: Yangtze River
- Locale: Chongqing, China

Characteristics
- Design: Box girder bridge
- Material: Prestressed concrete
- Total length: 1,540 metres (5,050 ft)
- Longest span: 260 metres (850 ft)

History
- Opened: 2008

Location
- Interactive map of Yudong Bridge

The Yudong Bridge is a prestressed concrete box girder bridge, which crosses the Yangtze River in Chongqing, China. Completed in 2008, it has a main span of 260 metres (850 ft). The bridge carries 6 lanes of China National Highway 210 between the Banan District south of the Yangtze River and the Dadukou District to the north. The bridge also carries Line 2 of the Chongqing Metro in its median.

== See also ==
- Yangtze River bridges and tunnels
