= Huanghuayuan station (Chengdu Metro) =

Railway station in the Sichuan Province

Huanghuayuan 皇花园

General information
- Location: Xindu District, Chengdu, Sichuan; China
- Coordinates: 30.75483°N 104.05727°E
- Operated by: Chengdu Metro Co., Ltd.
- Line: Line 5,
- Platforms: 2 (1 island platform)

Construction
- Structure type: Underground

Other information
- Station code: 0510

History
- Opened: 27 December 2019

Services
Preceding station	Chengdu Metro	Following station
Shixi Park towards Huagui Road	Line 5	Lujiaqiao towards Huilong
Location

Huanghuayuan (Chinese: 皇花园; pinyin: Huánghuāyuán; lit. 'Imperial Flower Garden') is an underground station on Line 5 of the Chengdu Metro in Xindu District, Chengdu, Sichuan, China. It opened on 27 December 2019 as part of the initial segment of Line 5.

== Location ==
Huanghuayuan station is located in northern Chengdu in Xindu District. The station is situated on the primarily north–south Line 5 corridor, between Shixi Park station to the north and Lujiaqiao station to the south.

== Station structure ==
Huanghuayuan is an underground station with one island platform serving two tracks. While the northern portion of Line 5 (from Huagui Road to Xingfuqiao) is elevated, Huanghuayuan is situated within the underground section of the line.

== History ==
Construction on Line 5 began in August 2015. The station opened on 27 December 2019 along with the rest of Line 5's initial 49-kilometre segment, which runs from Huagui Road in Xindu District to Huilong in the Tianfu New Area. The opening of Line 5 was part of a major expansion that added over 100 kilometres to the Chengdu Metro network and brought the total system length past 300 kilometres.

== Services ==
Line 5 is operated using eight-car Type A trainsets manufactured by CRRC Changchun Railway Vehicles, with trains running at intervals of approximately 3–5 minutes during peak hours.
