= Jiaochangkou station =

Railway station in Chongqing, China

Jiaochangkou 较场口
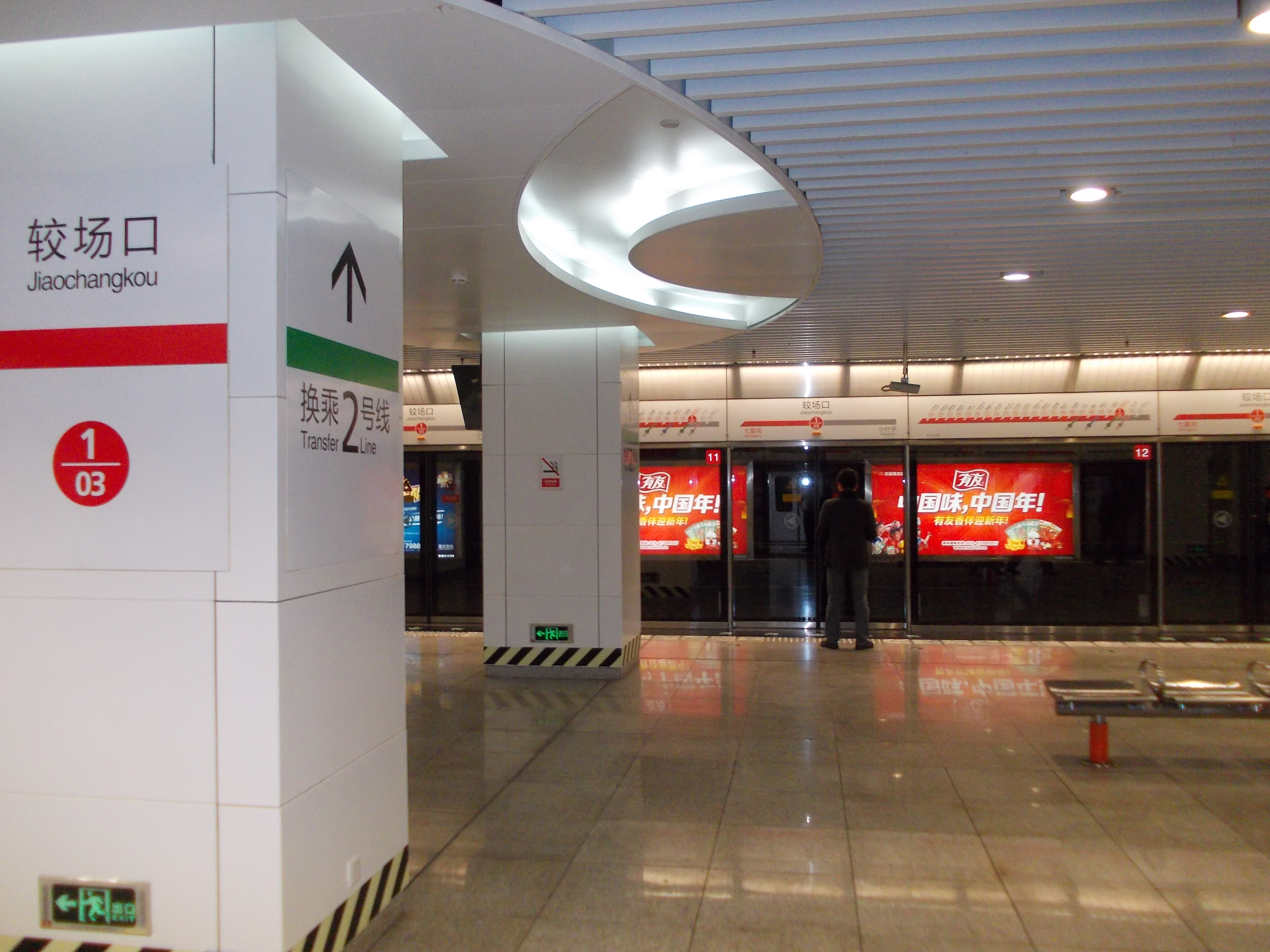
- Platform of Line 1

General information
- Location: Chongqing; China
- Coordinates: 29°33′21.60″N 106°34′11.60″E
- Operated by: Chongqing Rail Transit Corp., Ltd
- Lines: Line 1 Line 2
- Platforms: 4 (1 island platform and 2 side platforms)

Construction
- Structure type: Underground

Other information
- Station code: / /

History
- Opened: 28 December 2004; 21 years ago (Line 2); 28 July 2011; 14 years ago (Line 1)

Services
Preceding station	Chongqing Rail Transit	Following station
Xiaoshizi towards Chaotianmen	Line 1	Qixinggang towards Bishan
Terminus	Line 2	Linjiangmen towards Yudong
Location

Jiaochangkou is an interchange station between Line 1 and Line 2 of Chongqing Rail Transit in Chongqing Municipality, China, which opened in 2004. It is located in Yuzhong District.

== Station structure ==
=== Line 1 ===
LG	Exit 1
B1; Concourse	Exits 2-3, Customer service, Vending machines, Transfer passage to Line 2
B2; Concourse	Customer service, Vending machines
B3; Concourse	Exits 4-5, Customer service, Vending machines
B4; Platforms	Line 1 to Bishan (Qixinggang)
B4; Platforms	Island platform
B4; Platforms	Line 1 to Chaotianmen (Xiaoshizi)

=== Line 2 ===
B1; Concourse	Exits 6-11, Customer service, Vending machines, Transfer passage to Line 1
B2; Platforms	Side platform
B2; Platforms	Line 2 termination platform
B2; Platforms	Line 2 to Yudong (Linjiangmen)
B2; Platforms	Side platform
