= Yudong station =

Metro station in Chongqing, China

Yudong 鱼洞
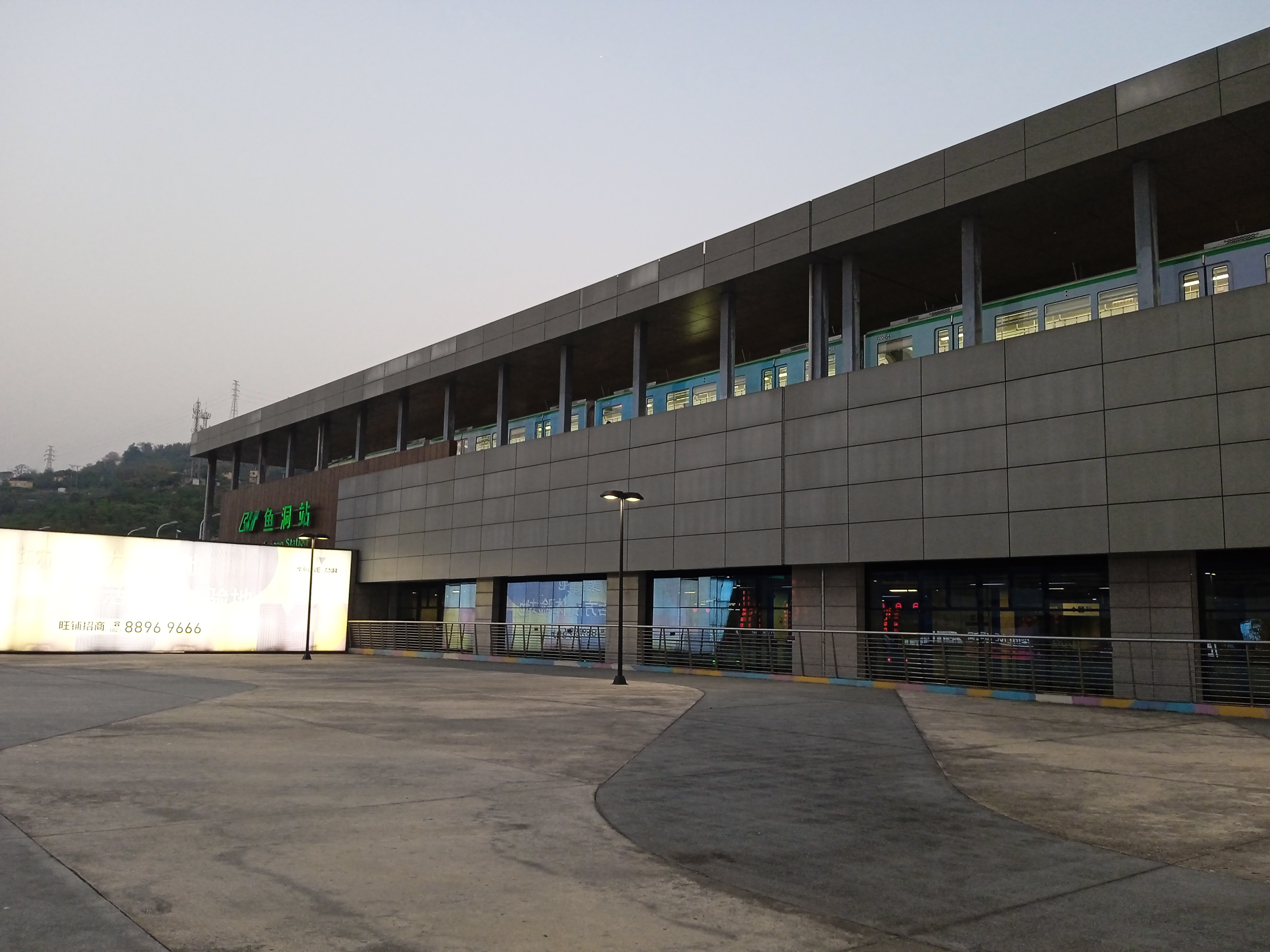

General information
- Location: Chongqing; China
- Coordinates: 29.3788°N 106.5021°E
- Operated by: Chongqing Rail Transit Corp., Ltd
- Lines: Line 2 Line 3
- Platforms: 4 (2 island platforms)

Construction
- Structure type: Elevated

Other information
- Station code: / /

History
- Opened: 28 December 2012; 13 years ago (Line 3); 30 December 2014; 11 years ago (Line 2)

Services
Preceding station	Chongqing Rail Transit	Following station
Dajiang towards Jiaochangkou	Line 2	Terminus
Terminus	Line 3	Jinzhu towards Terminal 2 of Jiangbei Airport
Location

Yudong is a station on Line 2 and Line 3 of Chongqing Rail Transit in Chongqing Municipality, China. The Line 3 station opened in 2012 with the Line 3 Southern Extension. The Line 2 station opened with the Southern Extension in 2014. It is located in Banan District.

== Station structure ==
3F; Platforms	Line 2 to Jiaochangkou (Dajiang)
3F; Platforms	Island platform
3F; Platforms	Line 2 termination platform
3F; Platforms	Line 3 termination platform
3F; Platforms	Island platform
3F; Platforms	Line 3 to Terminal 2 of Jiangbei Airport (Jinzhu)
2F; Concourse	Exits, Customer service, Vending machines, Toilets
1F	Exits
