= Xietaizi station =

Metro station in Chongqing, China

Xietaizi 歇台子
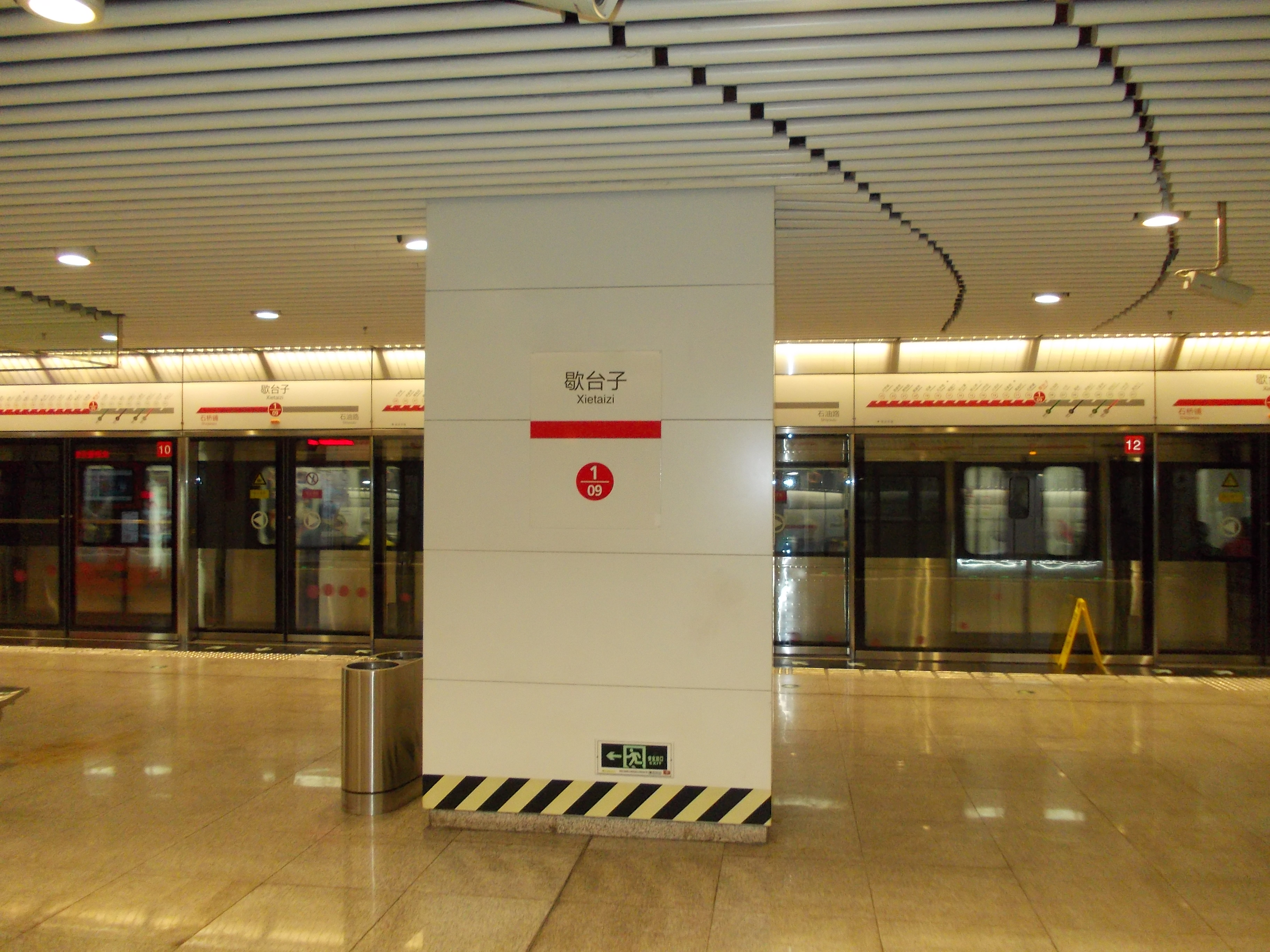
- Line 1 platform

Chinese name
- Chinese: 歇台子
- Hanyu Pinyin: Xiētáizi
Transcriptions
Standard Mandarin
- Hanyu Pinyin: Xiētáizi
- Wade–Giles: Hsieh^{1}-t‘ai^{2}-tzŭ
- IPA: [ɕjé.tʰǎɪ.tsɨ]

General information
- Location: Jiulongpo, Chongqing; China
- Coordinates: 29.53808°N 106.49366°E
- Operator: Chongqing Rail Transit Corp., Ltd
- Lines: Line 1 Line 5 Line 18
- Platforms: 6 (3 island platforms)

Construction
- Structure type: Underground

Other information
- Station code: / / /

History
- Opened: 28 July 2011; 15 years ago (Line 1); 30 November 2023; 2 years ago (Line 5); 26 June 2025; 14 months ago (Line 18)

Services
Preceding station	Chongqing Rail Transit	Following station
Shiyoulu towards Chaotianmen	Line 1	Shiqiaopu towards Bishan
Hongyancun towards Yuegangbeilu	Line 5	Shiqiaopu towards Tiaodeng
Fuhualu Terminus	Line 18	Olympic Sports Center towards Tiaodengnan
Location

Xietaizi is a station on Line 1, Line 5 and Line 18 of Chongqing Rail Transit in Chongqing Municipality, China. It is located in Jiulongpo District. The station opened to passengers in 2011.

== Station Structure ==
B1; Concourse	Exits, Customer Service, Vending Machines
B2; Platforms	Line 1 to Chaotianmen (Shiyoulu)
B2; Platforms	Island platform
B2; Platforms	Line 1 to Bishan (Shiqiaopu)

=== Line 5 Platforms ===
B2; Platforms	Line 5 to Yuegangbeilu (Hongyancun)
B2; Platforms	Island platform
B2; Platforms	Line 5 to Tiaodeng (Shiqiaopu)

=== Line 18 Platforms ===
F2; Platforms	Line 18 to Xiaoshizi (Fuhualu)
F2; Platforms	Island platform
F2; Platforms	Line 18 to Tiaodengnan (Olympic Sports Center)
