= Yanggongqiao station =

Metro station in Chongqing, China

Yanggongqiao 杨公桥
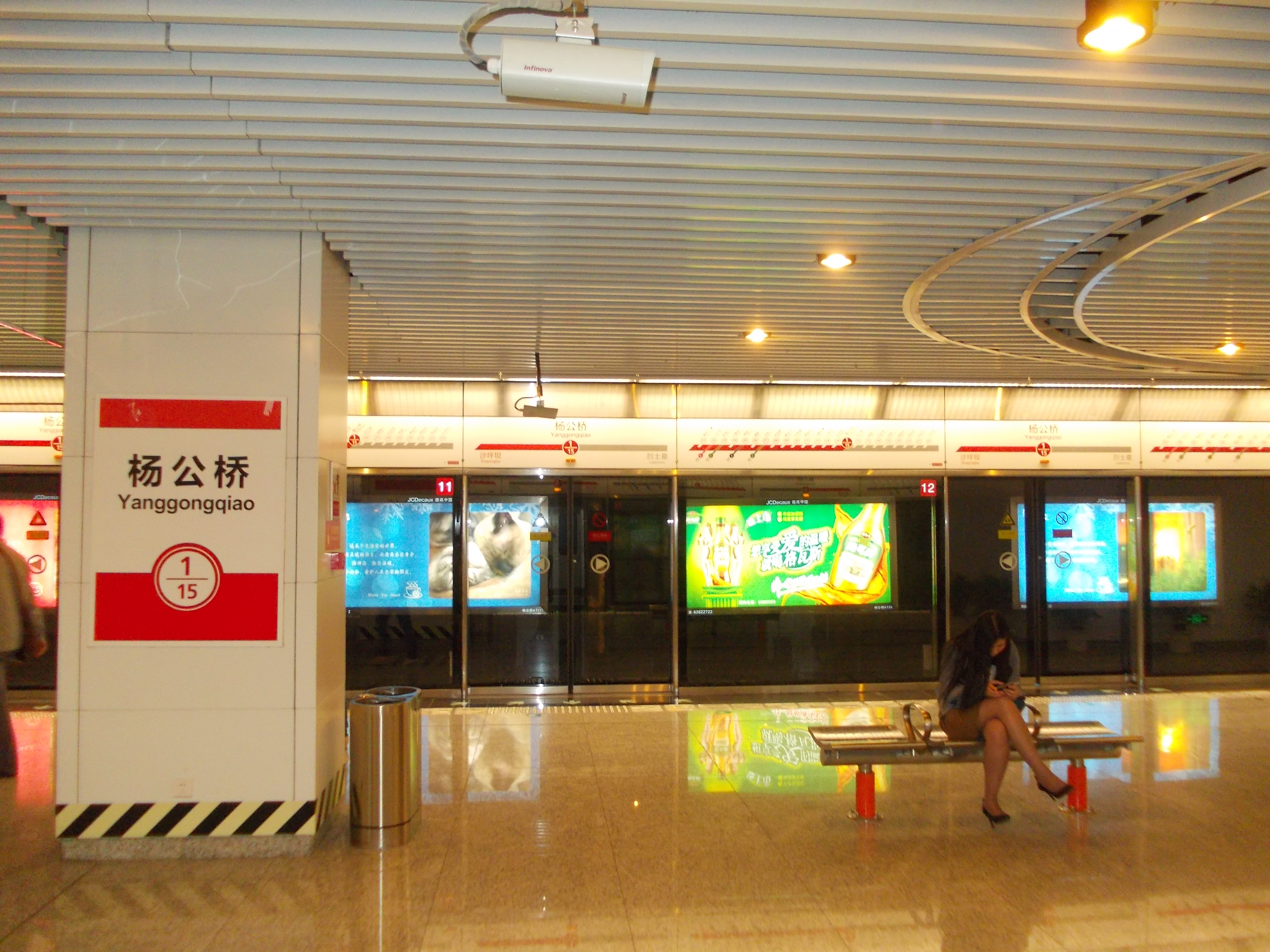

General information
- Location: Chongqing; China
- Operated by: Chongqing Rail Transit Corp., Ltd
- Line: Line 1
- Platforms: 2 (1 island platform)

Construction
- Structure type: Underground

Other information
- Station code: /

History
- Opened: 20 December 2012; 13 years ago

Services
Preceding station	Chongqing Rail Transit	Following station
Shapingba towards Chaotianmen	Line 1	Lieshimu towards Bishan
Location

Yanggongqiao is a station on Line 1 of Chongqing Rail Transit in Chongqing Municipality, China. It is located in Shapingba District. It opened in 2012.

== Station structure ==
B1	Exits 1B, 3
B2	Exit 1A
B3
B4; Concourse	Exits 2, 4, Customer service, Vending machines
B5; Platforms	Line 1 to Bishan (Lieshimu)
B5; Platforms	Island platform
B5; Platforms	Line 1 to Chaotianmen (Shapingba)
