= Chenjiaqiao station =

Railway station in Chongqing, China

Chenjiaqiao 陈家桥
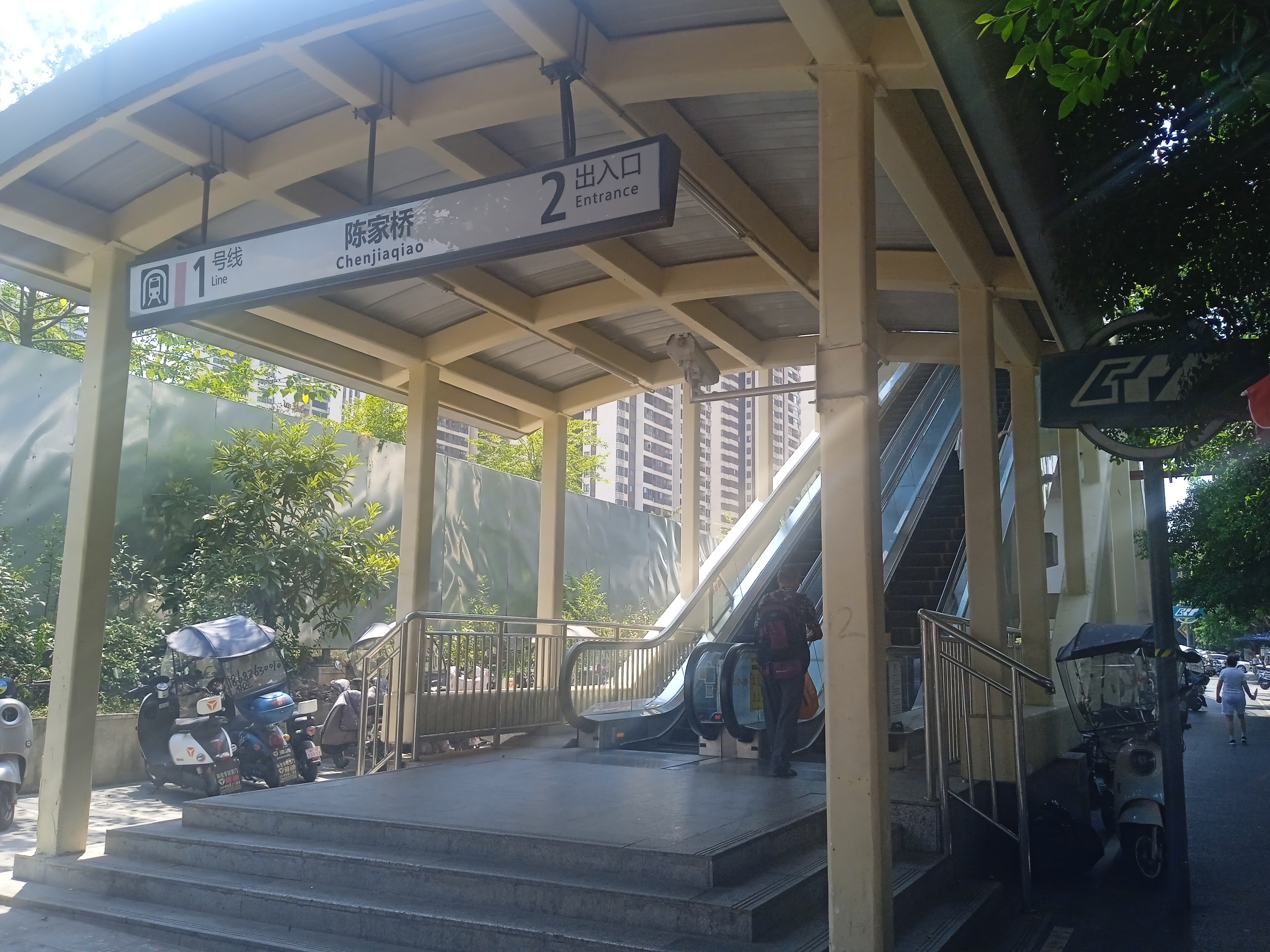

General information
- Location: Chongqing; China
- Coordinates: 29.61°N 106.32457°E
- Operated by: Chongqing Rail Transit Corp., Ltd
- Line: Line 1
- Platforms: 2 side platforms

Construction
- Structure type: Elevated

Other information
- Station code: /

History
- Opened: 20 December 2012; 13 years ago

Services
Preceding station	Chongqing Rail Transit	Following station
Weidianyuan towards Chaotianmen	Line 1	Daxuecheng towards Bishan
Location

Chenjiaqiao is a station on Line 1 of Chongqing Rail Transit located in Shapingba District, Chongqing Municipality, China. It opened in 2012.

== Station structure ==
3F; Platforms	Side platform
3F; Platforms	Line 1 to Bishan (Daxuecheng)
3F; Platforms	Line 1 to Chaotianmen (Weidianyuan)
3F; Platforms	Side platform
2F; Concourse	Exits, Customer service, Vending machines, Toilets
