= Majiayan station =

Metro station in Chongqing, China

Majiayan 马家岩
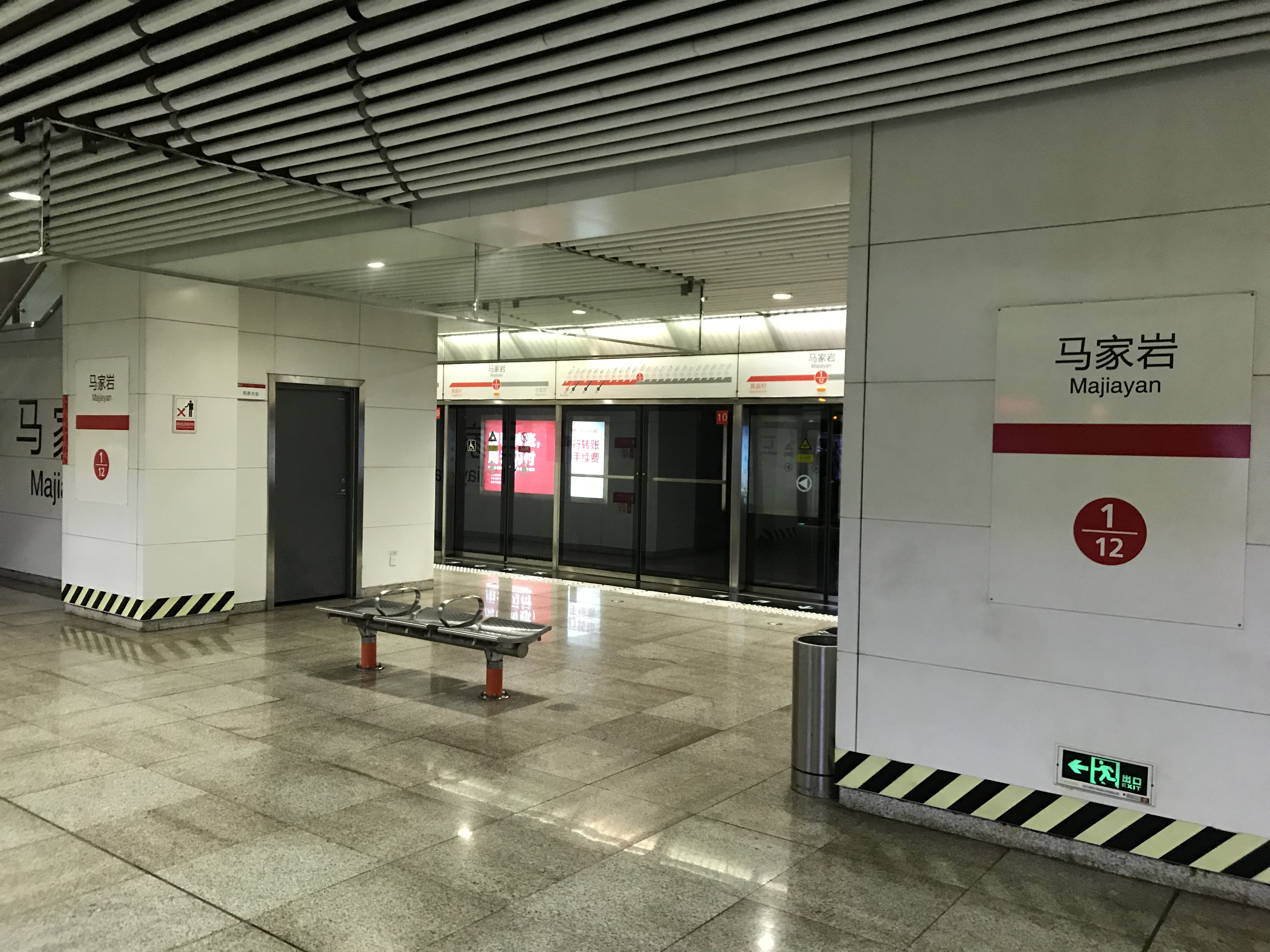

Chinese name
- Traditional Chinese: 馬家岩
- Simplified Chinese: 马家岩
- Hanyu Pinyin: Mǎjiāyán
Transcriptions
Standard Mandarin
- Hanyu Pinyin: Mǎjiāyán
- Wade–Giles: Ma^{3}-chia^{1}-yen^{2}
- IPA: [mà.tɕjá.jɛ̌n]
Yue: Cantonese
- Yale Romanization: Máhgā'ngàahm
- Jyutping: maa5 gaa1 ngaam4
- IPA: [ma˩˧.ka˥.ŋam˩]

General information
- Location: Shapingba District, Chongqing; China
- Operated by: Chongqing Rail Transit Corp., Ltd
- Line: Line 1
- Platforms: 2 (1 island platform)

Construction
- Structure type: Underground

Other information
- Station code: /

History
- Opened: 25 September 2013; 12 years ago

Services
Preceding station	Chongqing Rail Transit	Following station
Gaomiaocun towards Chaotianmen	Line 1	Xiaolongkan towards Bishan
Location

Majiayan is a station on Line 1 of Chongqing Rail Transit in Shapingba District, Chongqing Municipality, China. It opened in 2013.

== Station structure ==
B1; Concourse	Exits, Customer service, Vending machines
B2; Platforms	Line 1 to Bishan (Xiaolongkan)
B2; Platforms	Island platform
B2; Platforms	Line 1 to Chaotianmen (Gaomiaocun)
