= Lieshimu station =

Metro station in Chongqing, China

Lieshimu 烈士墓
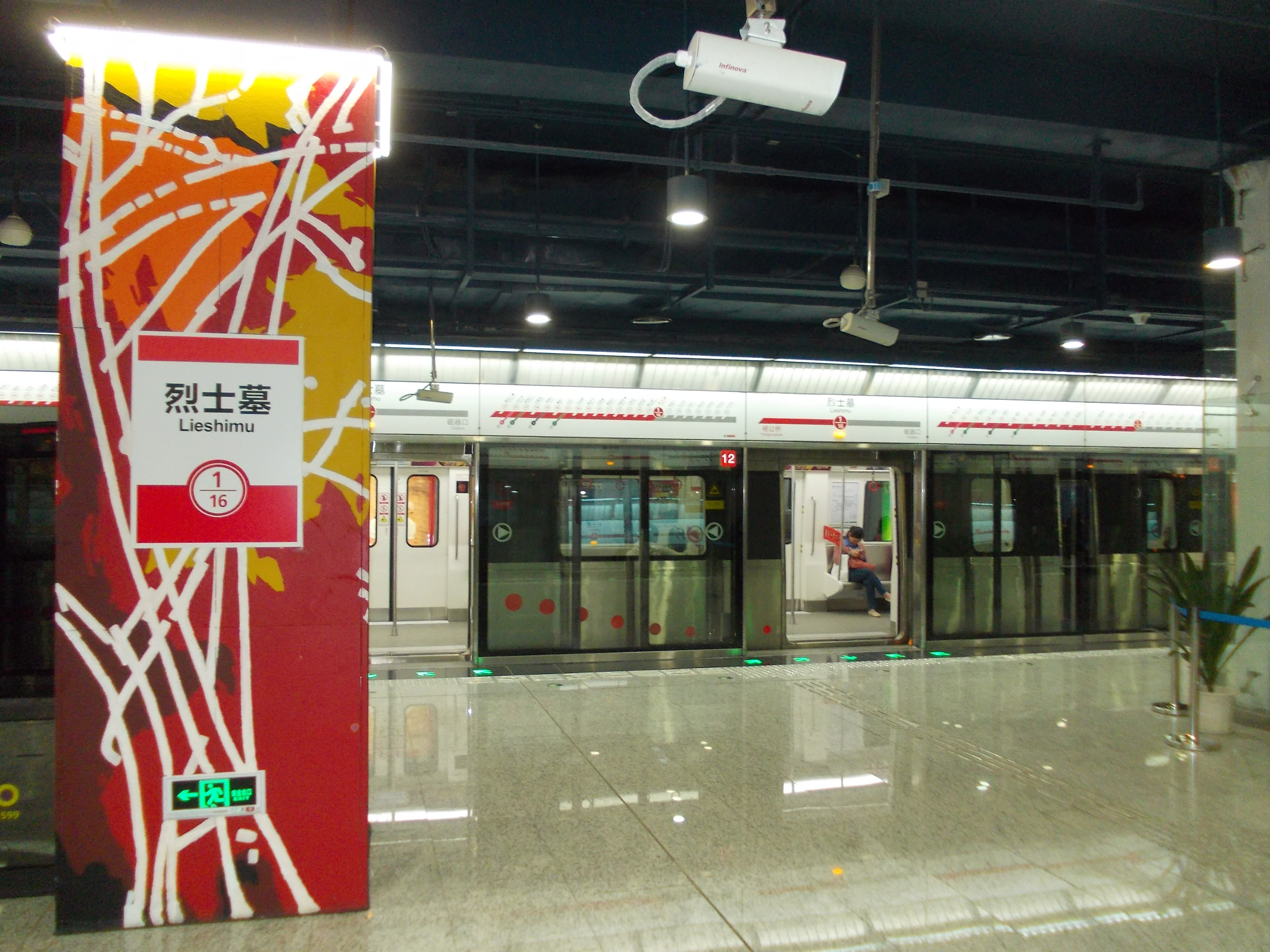

General information
- Location: Chongqing; China
- Coordinates: 29.5701°N 106.4415°E
- Operated by: Chongqing Rail Transit Corp., Ltd
- Line: Line 1
- Platforms: 2 (1 island platform)

Construction
- Structure type: Underground

Other information
- Station code: /

History
- Opened: 20 December 2012; 13 years ago

Services
Preceding station	Chongqing Rail Transit	Following station
Yanggongqiao towards Chaotianmen	Line 1	Ciqikou towards Bishan
Location

Lieshimu is a station on Line 1 of Chongqing Rail Transit in Chongqing Municipality, China. It is located in Shapingba District. It opened in 2012.

== Station structure ==
B1; Concourse	Exits, Customer service, Vending machines
B2; Platforms	Line 1 to Bishan (Ciqikou)
B2; Platforms	Island platform
B2; Platforms	Line 1 to Chaotianmen (Yanggongqiao)
