= Eling station =

Metro station in Chongqing, China

Eling 鹅岭
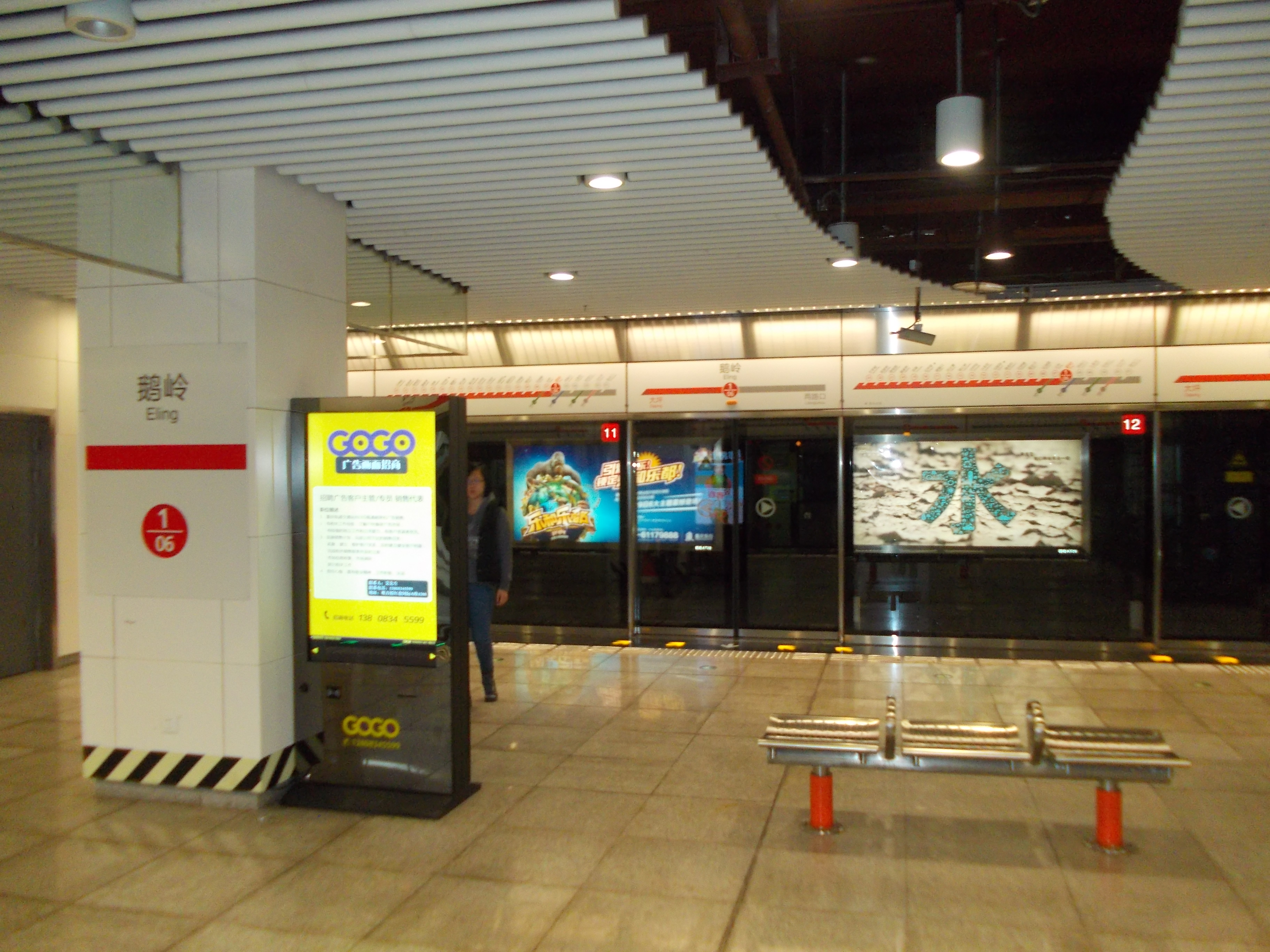

General information
- Location: Chongqing; China
- Operated by: Chongqing Rail Transit Corp., Ltd
- Line: Line 1
- Platforms: 2 (1 island platform)

Construction
- Structure type: Underground

Other information
- Station code: /

History
- Opened: 28 July 2011; 14 years ago

Services
Preceding station	Chongqing Rail Transit	Following station
Lianglukou towards Chaotianmen	Line 1	Daping towards Bishan
Location

Eling is a station on Line 1 of Chongqing Rail Transit in Chongqing Municipality, China. It is located in Yuzhong District. It opened in 2011. This station is adjacent to Eling Park.

== Station structure ==
B1; Concourse	Exits, Customer service, Vending machines
B2; Platforms	Line 1 to Bishan (Daping)
B2; Platforms	Island platform
B2; Platforms	Line 1 to Chaotianmen (Lianglukou)
