= Laijiaqiao station =

Metro station in Chongqing, China

Laijiaqiao 赖家桥
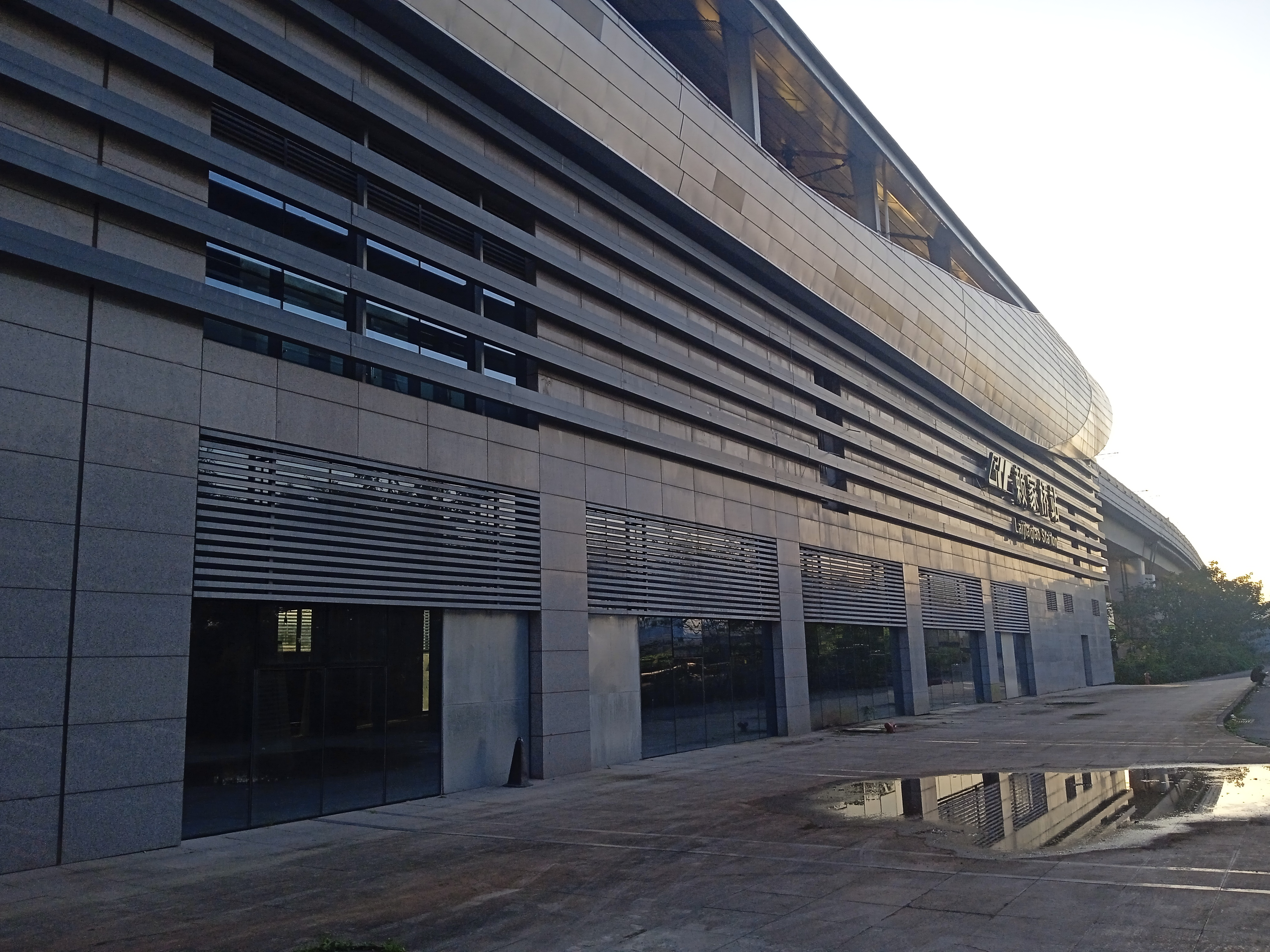
- North side of the station

General information
- Location: Chongqing; China
- Operated by: Chongqing Rail Transit Corp., Ltd
- Line: Line 1
- Platforms: 2 (1 island platform)

Construction
- Structure type: Elevated

Other information
- Station code: /

History
- Opened: 20 December 2012; 13 years ago

Services
Preceding station	Chongqing Rail Transit	Following station
Shuangbei towards Chaotianmen	Line 1	Weidianyuan towards Bishan
Location

Laijiaqiao is a station on Line 1 of Chongqing Rail Transit in Chongqing Municipality, China. It is located in Shapingba District. It opened in 2012.

== Station structure ==
3F; Platforms	Line 1 to Bishan (Weidianyuan)
3F; Platforms	Island platform
3F; Platforms	Line 1 to Chaotianmen (Shuangbei)
2F; Concourse	Exits, Customer service, Vending machines, Toilets
