= Daping station =

Metro station in Chongqing, China

Coordinates: 29°32′31″N 106°31′10″E

Daping 大坪
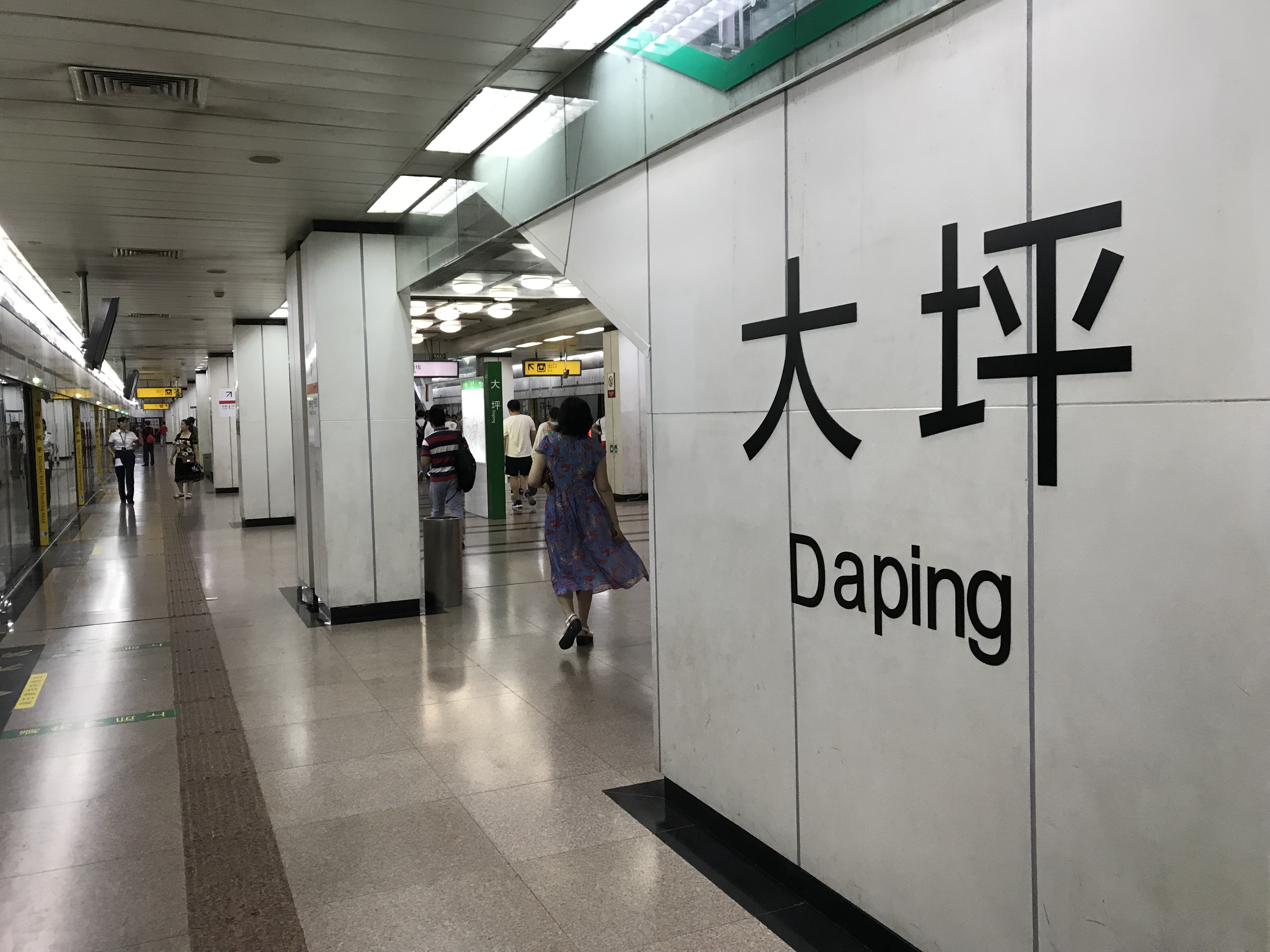
- Line 2 platform

General information
- Location: Chongqing; China
- Operated by: Chongqing Rail Transit Corp., Ltd
- Lines: Line 1; Line 2
- Platforms: 4 (2 island platforms)

Construction
- Structure type: Underground

Other information
- Station code: / /

History
- Opened: 28 December 2004; 21 years ago (Line 2); 28 July 2011; 14 years ago (Line 1)

Services
Preceding station	Chongqing Rail Transit	Following station
Eling towards Chaotianmen	Line 1	Shiyoulu towards Bishan
Fotuguan towards Jiaochangkou	Line 2	Yuanjiagang towards Yudong
Location

Daping is an interchange station between Line 1 and Line 2 of Chongqing Rail Transit in Chongqing Municipality, China, which opened in 2004. It is located in Yuzhong District.

== Station structure ==
=== Line 1 ===
B1; Concourse	Exits 1-4, Customer service, Vending machines, Transfer passage to Line 2
B2; Platforms	Line 1 to Bishan (Shiyoulu)
B2; Platforms	Island platform
B2; Platforms	Line 1 to Chaotianmen (Eling)

=== Line 2 ===
B1; Concourse	Exits 5-7, Customer service, Vending machines, Transfer passage to Line 1
B2; Platforms	Line 2 to Yudong (Yuanjiagang)
B2; Platforms	Island platform
B2; Platforms	Line 2 to Jiaochangkou (Fotuguan)

== Gallery ==
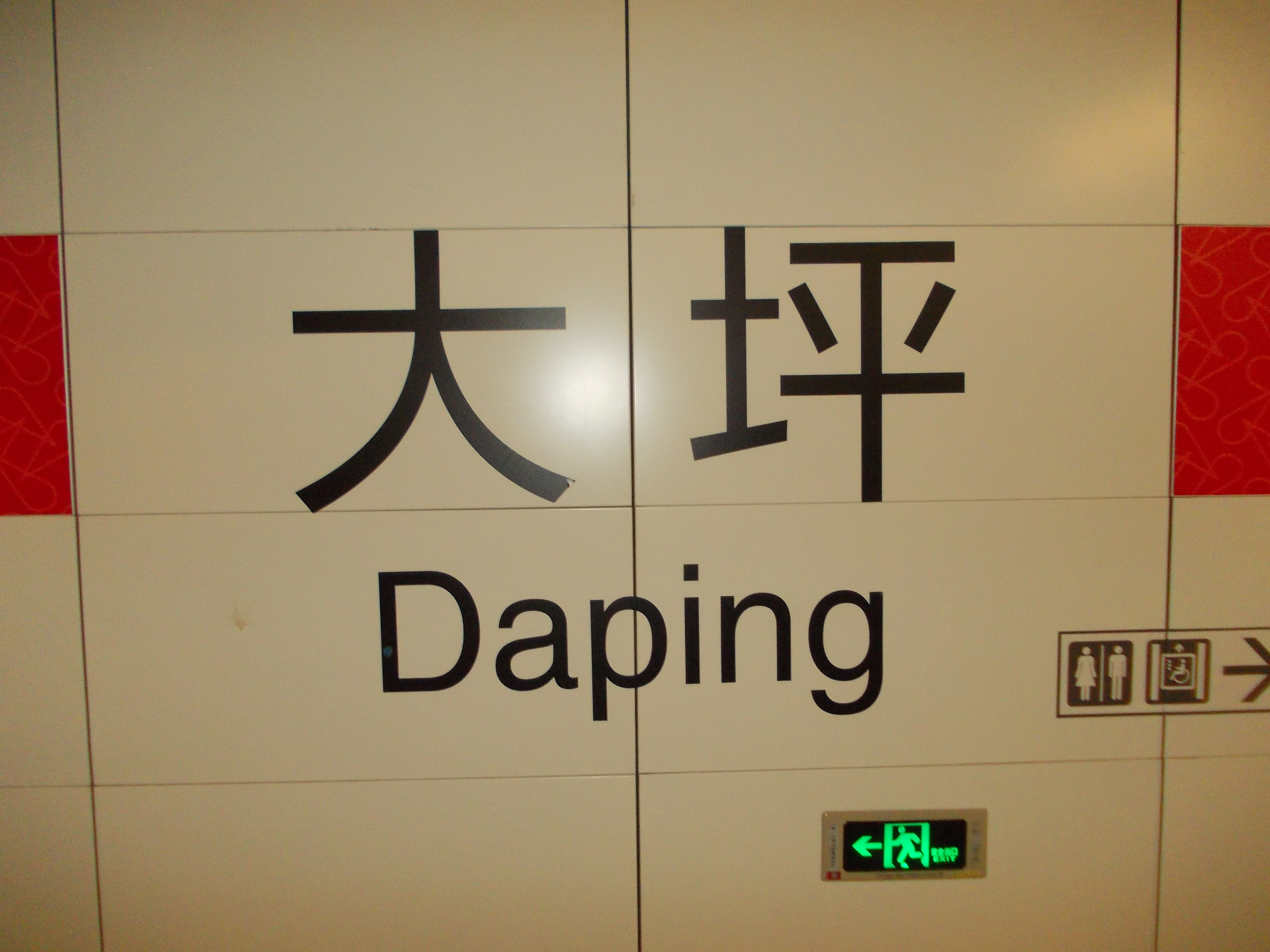
Sign

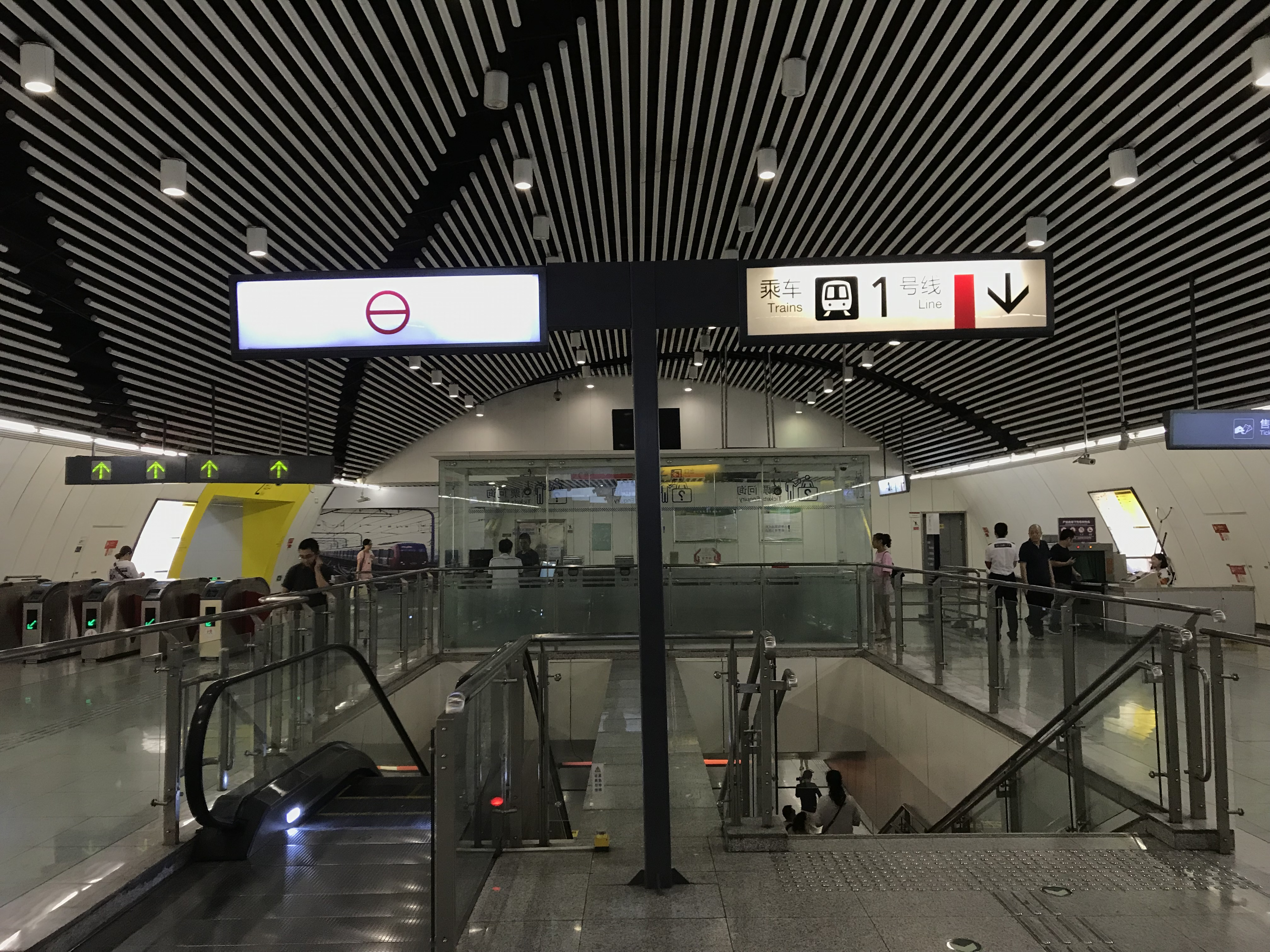
Concourse

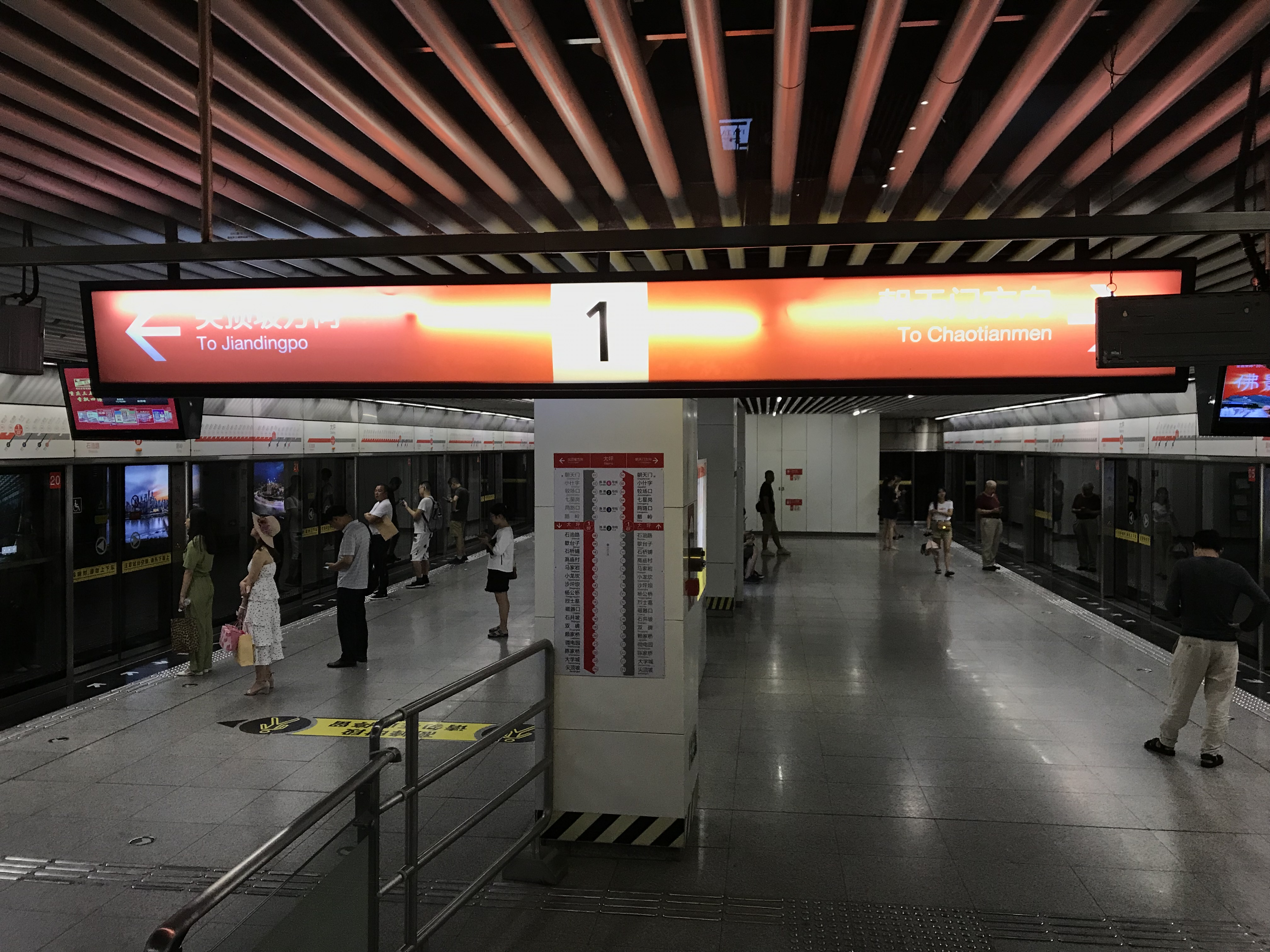
Line 1 platform

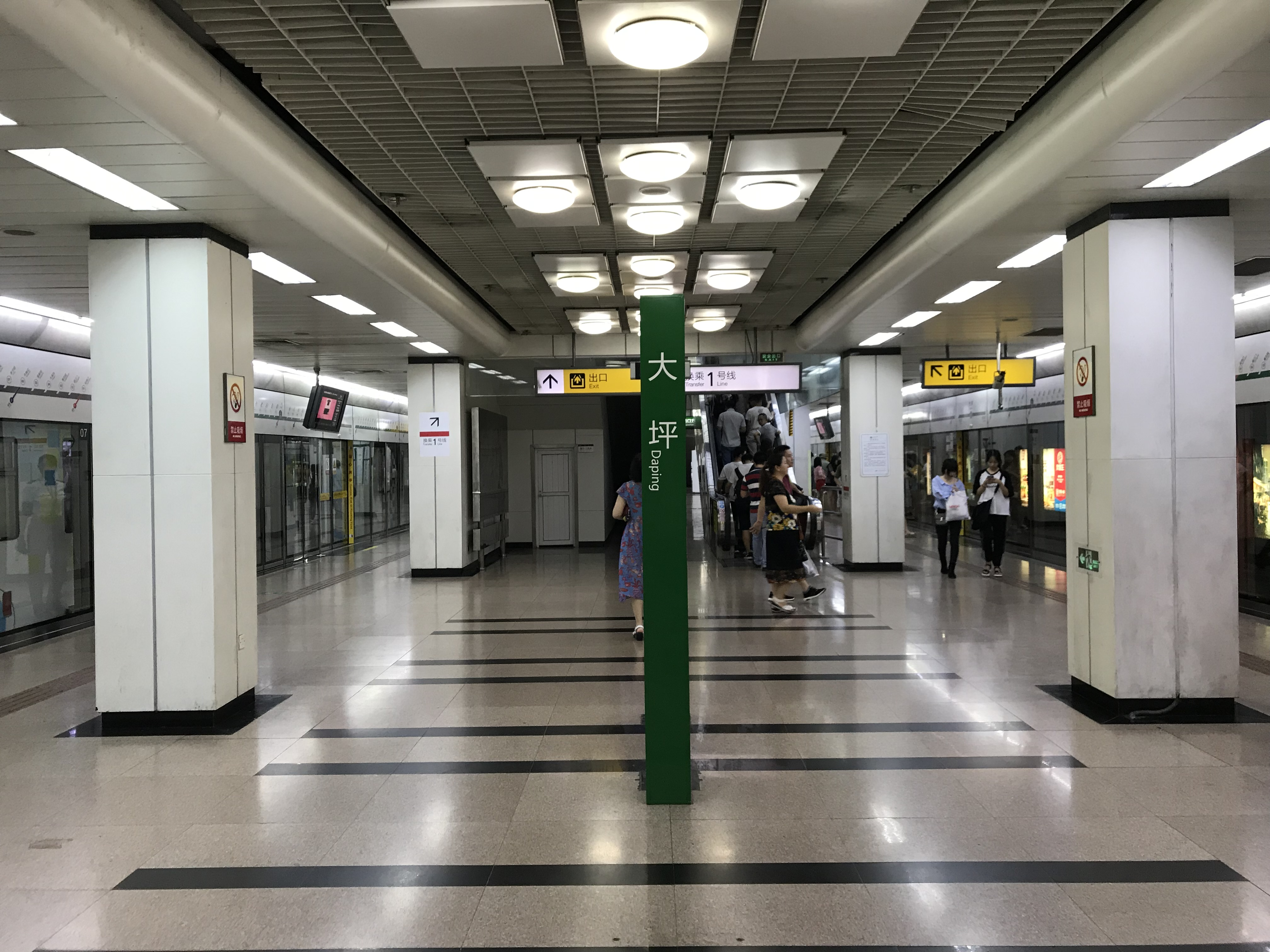
Line 2 platform
