= Daxuecheng station (Chongqing Rail Transit) =

Metro station in Chongqing, China

Daxuecheng 大学城
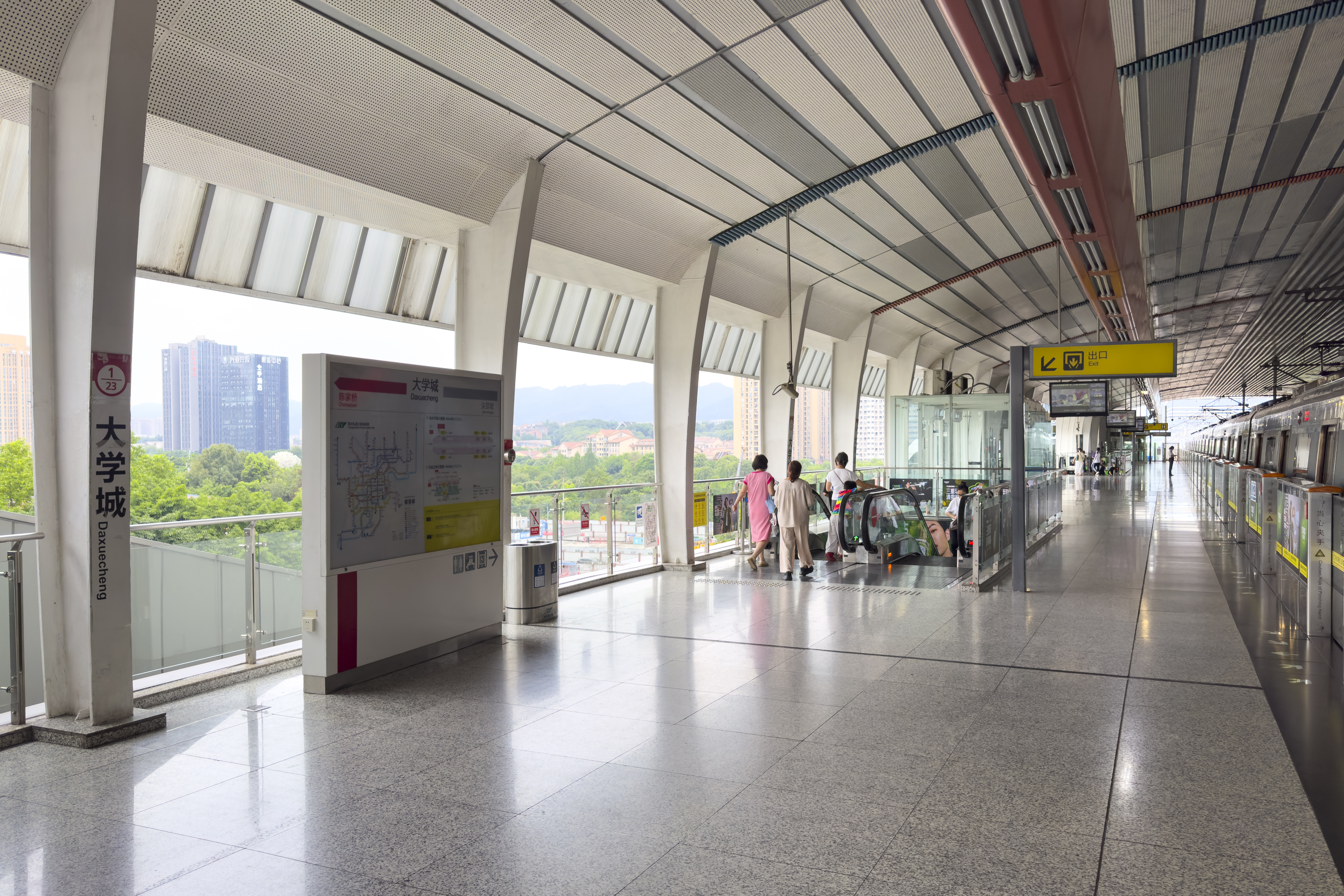
- Platform

General information
- Location: Chongqing; China
- Coordinates: 29.60997°N 106.30505°E
- Operated by: Chongqing Rail Transit Corp., Ltd
- Line: Line 1
- Platforms: 2 side platforms

Construction
- Structure type: Elevated

Other information
- Station code: /

History
- Opened: 20 December 2012; 13 years ago

Services
Preceding station	Chongqing Rail Transit	Following station
Chenjiaqiao towards Chaotianmen	Line 1	Jiandingpo towards Bishan
Location

Daxuecheng (literally University Town) is a station on Line 1 of Chongqing Rail Transit in Chongqing Municipality, China. It is located in Shapingba District. It opened in 2012.

== Station structure ==
3F; Platforms	Side platform
3F; Platforms	Line 1 to Bishan (Jiandingpo)
3F; Platforms	Line 1 to Chaotianmen (Chenjiaqiao)
3F; Platforms	Side platform
2F; Concourse	Exits, Customer service, Vending machines, Toilets

== Gallery ==
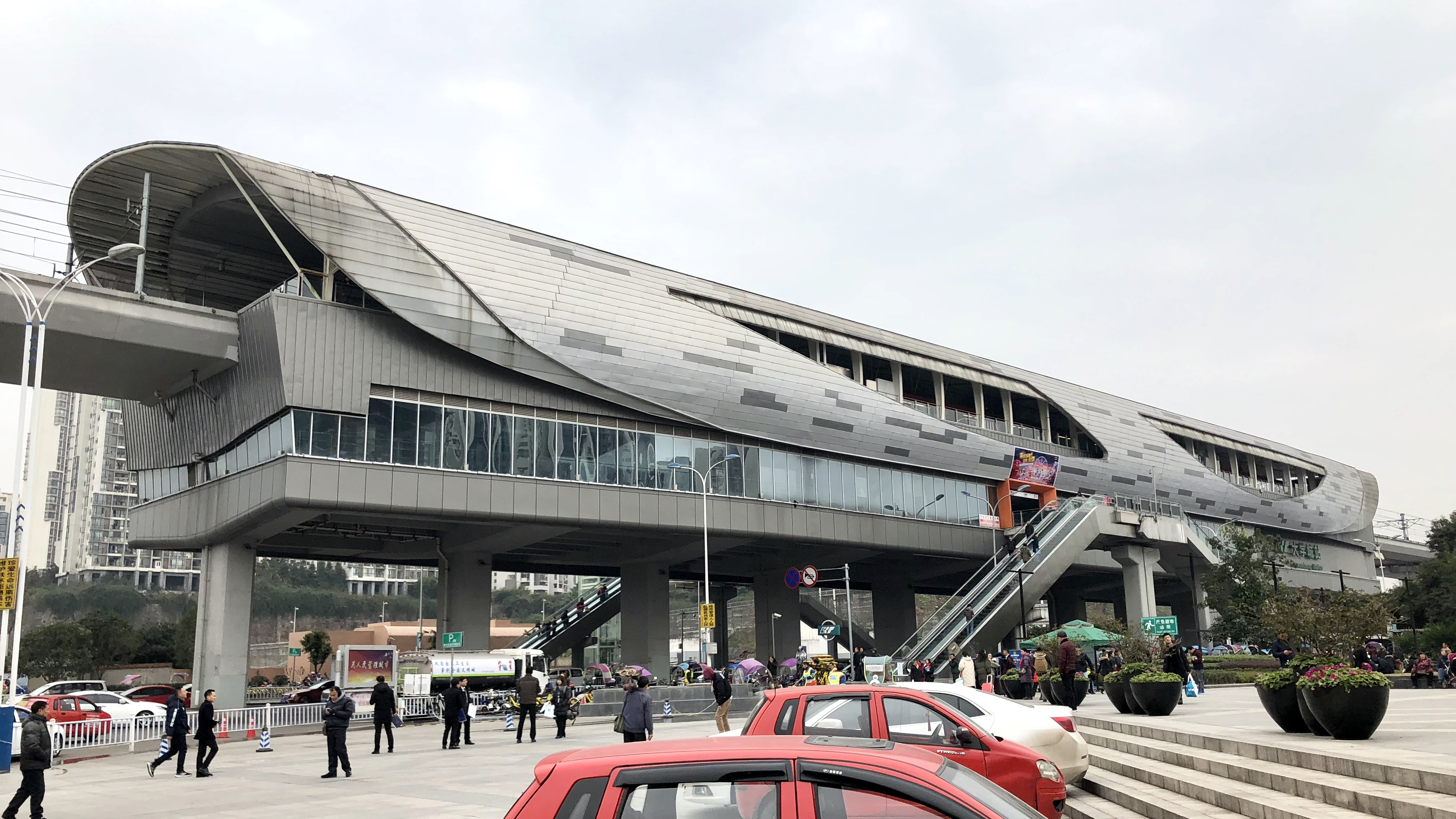
Station exterior

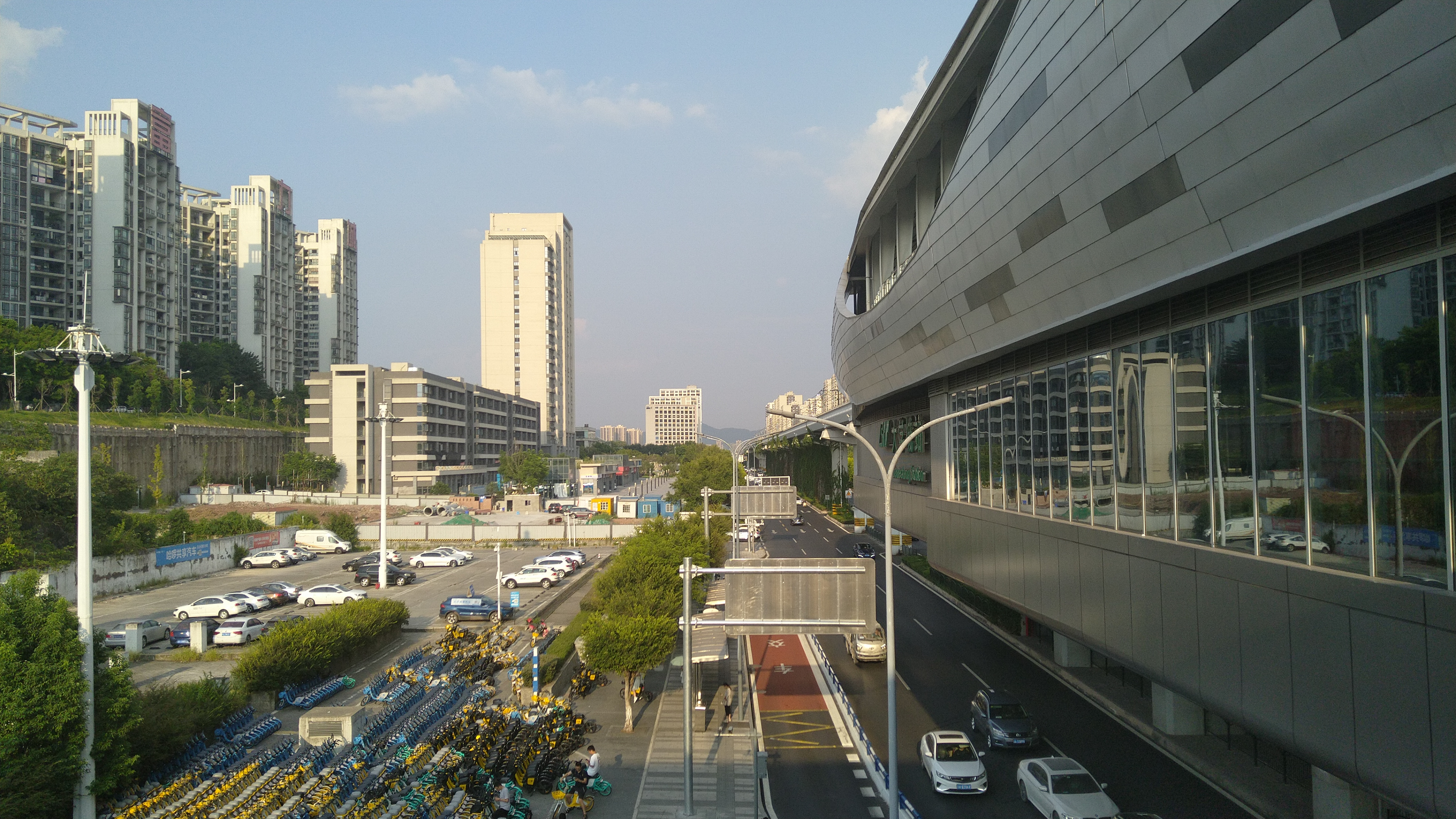
View from Daxuecheng Station in 2023
