= Shuangbei =

Shuangbei may refer to:

- Shuangbei Station, Chongqing, China
- Shuangbei Township, Hebei, China
- The Taipei–Keelung metropolitan area in Taiwan
