= Ciqikou station (Chongqing Rail Transit) =

Metro station in Chongqing, China

Ciqikou 磁器口
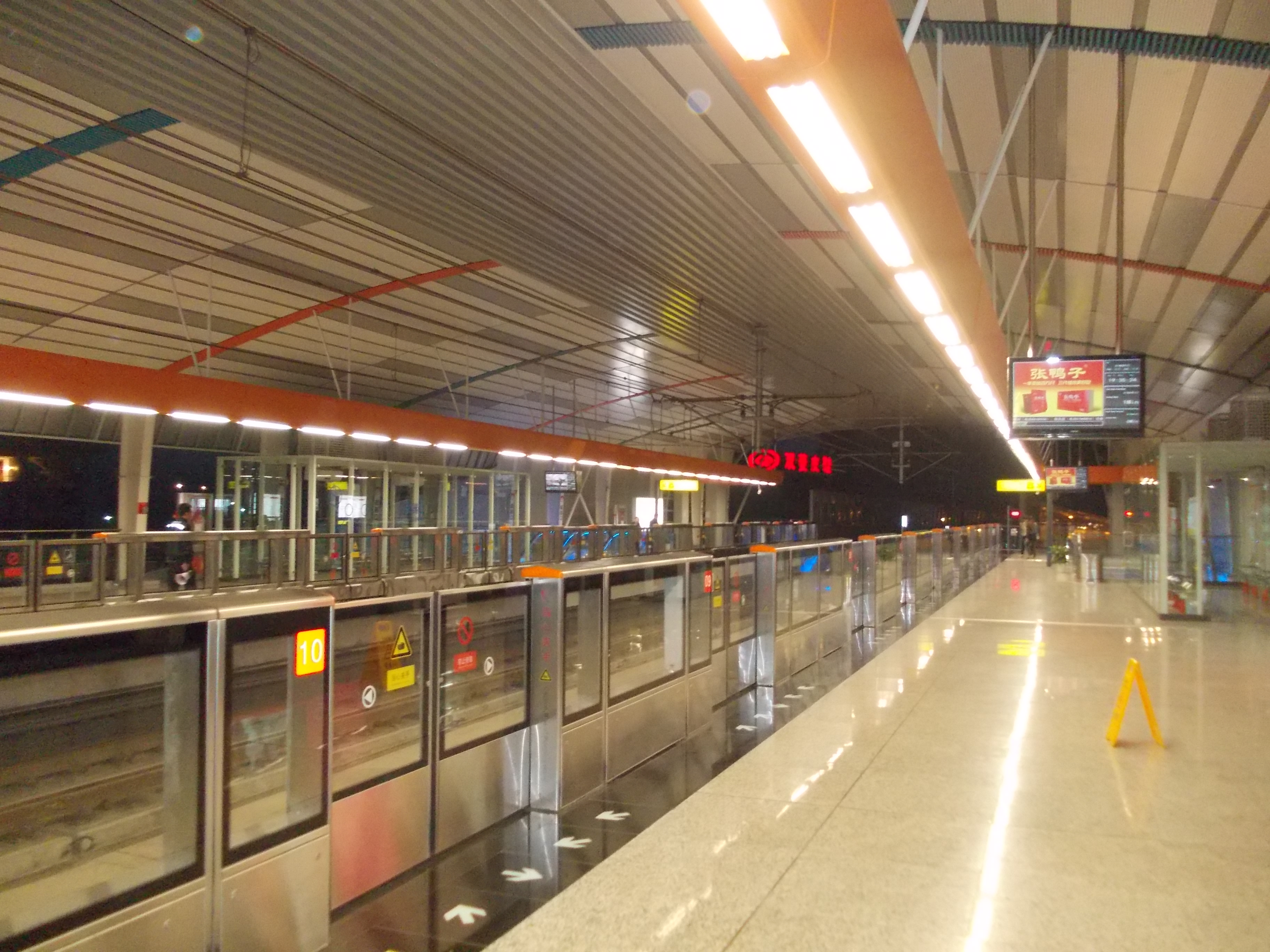

Chinese name
- Chinese: 磁器口
- Hanyu Pinyin: Cíqìkǒu
Transcriptions
Standard Mandarin
- Hanyu Pinyin: Cíqìkǒu
- Wade–Giles: Tz‘ŭ^{2}-ch‘i^{4}-k‘ou^{3}
- IPA: [tsʰɨ̌.tɕʰî.kʰòʊ]
Yue: Cantonese
- Yale Romanization: Chìhheiháu
- Jyutping: ci4 hei3 hau2
- IPA: [tsʰi˩.hej˧.hɐw˧˥]

General information
- Location: Shapingba District, Chongqing; China
- Coordinates: 29.579337°N 106.442447°E
- Operated by: Chongqing Rail Transit Corp., Ltd
- Line: Line 1
- Platforms: 2 side platforms

Construction
- Structure type: Elevated

Other information
- Station code: /

History
- Opened: 20 December 2012; 13 years ago (Line 1)

Services
Preceding station	Chongqing Rail Transit	Following station
Lieshimu towards Chaotianmen	Line 1	Shijingpo towards Bishan
Location

Ciqikou is a station on Line 1 of Chongqing Rail Transit in Shapingba District, Chongqing Municipality, China. It opened in 2012.
Line 27, which is currently under construction, will also serve the station in future.

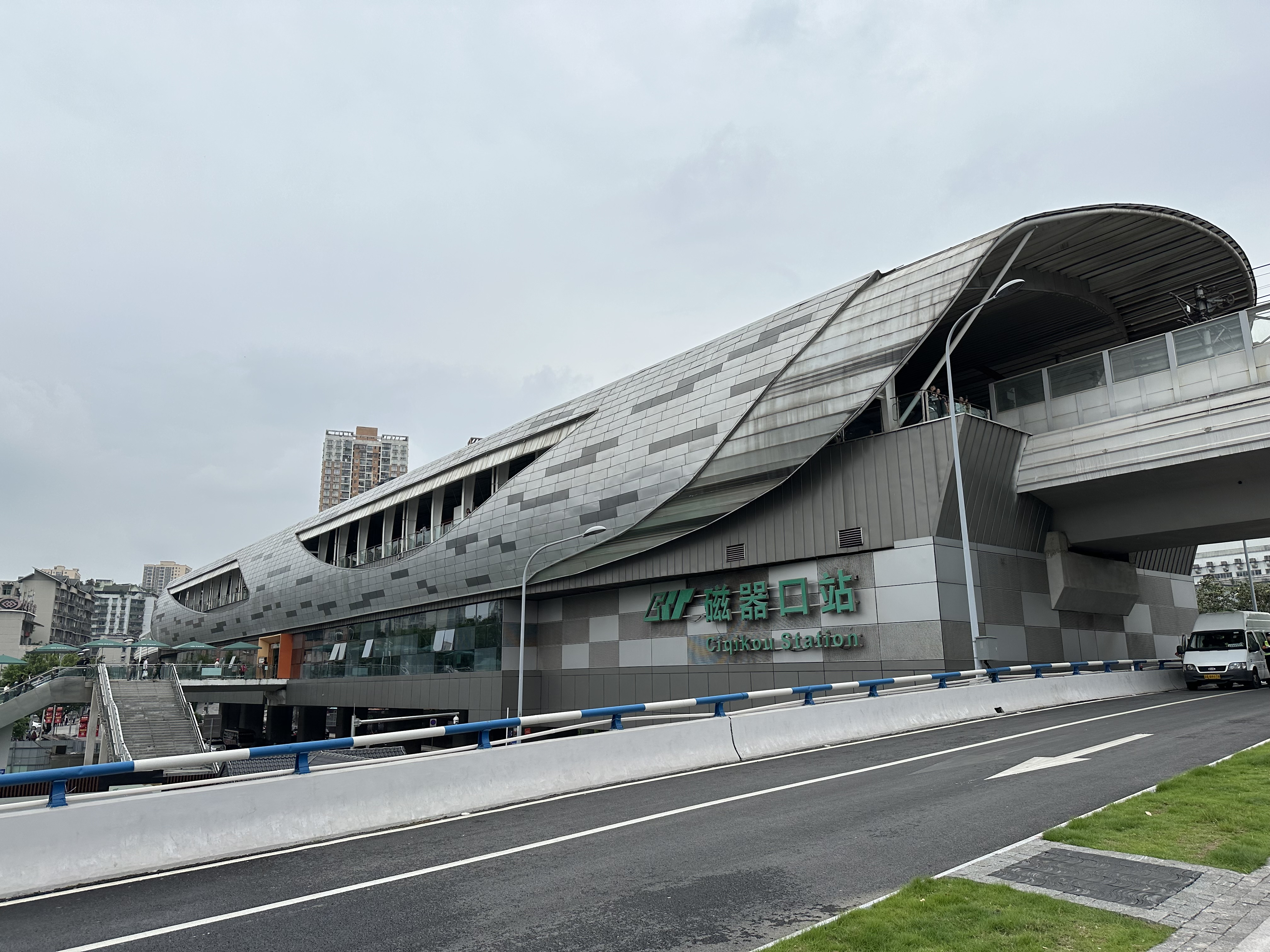
Exterior

== Station structure ==
3F; Platforms	Side platform
3F; Platforms	Line 1 to Bishan (Shijingpo)
3F; Platforms	Line 1 to Chaotianmen (Lieshimu)
3F; Platforms	Side platform
2F; Concourse	Exits, Customer service, Vending machines, Toilets
