= Shuangbei station =

Metro station in Chongqing, China

Shuangbei 双碑
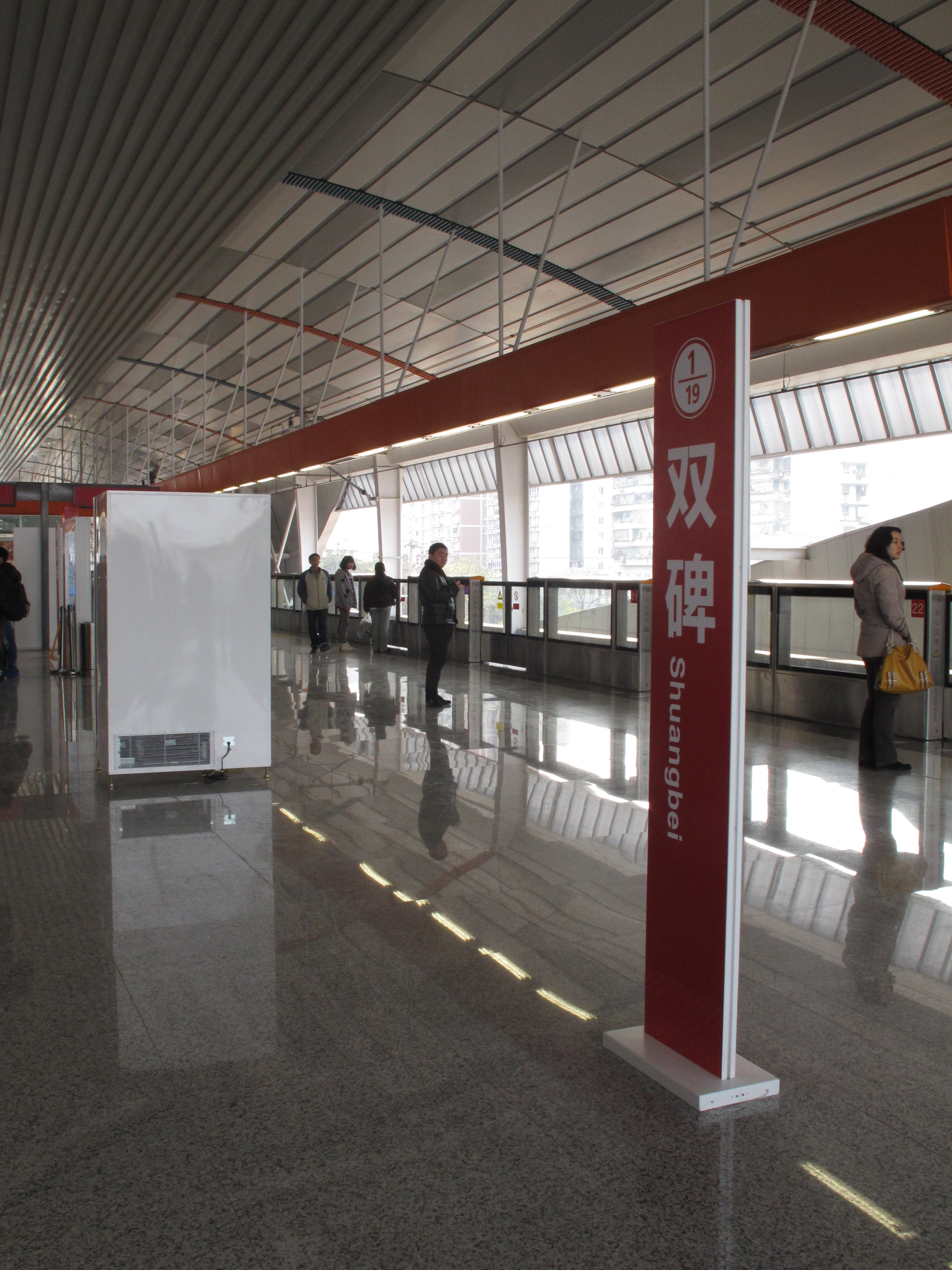

General information
- Location: Chongqing; China
- Operated by: Chongqing Rail Transit Corp., Ltd
- Line: Line 1
- Platforms: 2 (1 island platform)

Construction
- Structure type: Elevated

Other information
- Station code: /

History
- Opened: 20 December 2012; 13 years ago

Services
Preceding station	Chongqing Rail Transit	Following station
Shijingpo towards Chaotianmen	Line 1	Laijiaqiao towards Bishan
Location

Shuangbei is a station on Line 1 of Chongqing Rail Transit in Chongqing Municipality, China. It is located in Shapingba District. It opened in 2012.

== Station structure ==
4F; Platforms	Line 1 to Bishan (Laijiaqiao)
4F; Platforms	Island platform
4F; Platforms	Line 1 to Chaotianmen (Shijingpo)
3F; Concourse	Exit 1, Customer service, Vending machines, Toilets
2F
1F	Exit 2
