= Ciqikou =

Ciqikou may refer to:

- Ciqikou, Chongqing, subdistrict in Shapingba District, Chongqing, China
  - Ciqikou station (Chongqing Rail Transit), a station on the Chongqing Rail Transit
- Ciqikou, Beijing, area in Dongcheng District, Beijing, China
  - Ciqi Kou station, a station on the Beijing Subway

== See also ==
- Ciqikou crosses, several East Syriac Christian crosses found in Ciqikou, Chongqing
