= Jiandingpo station =

Metro station in Chongqing, China

Jiandingpo 尖顶坡
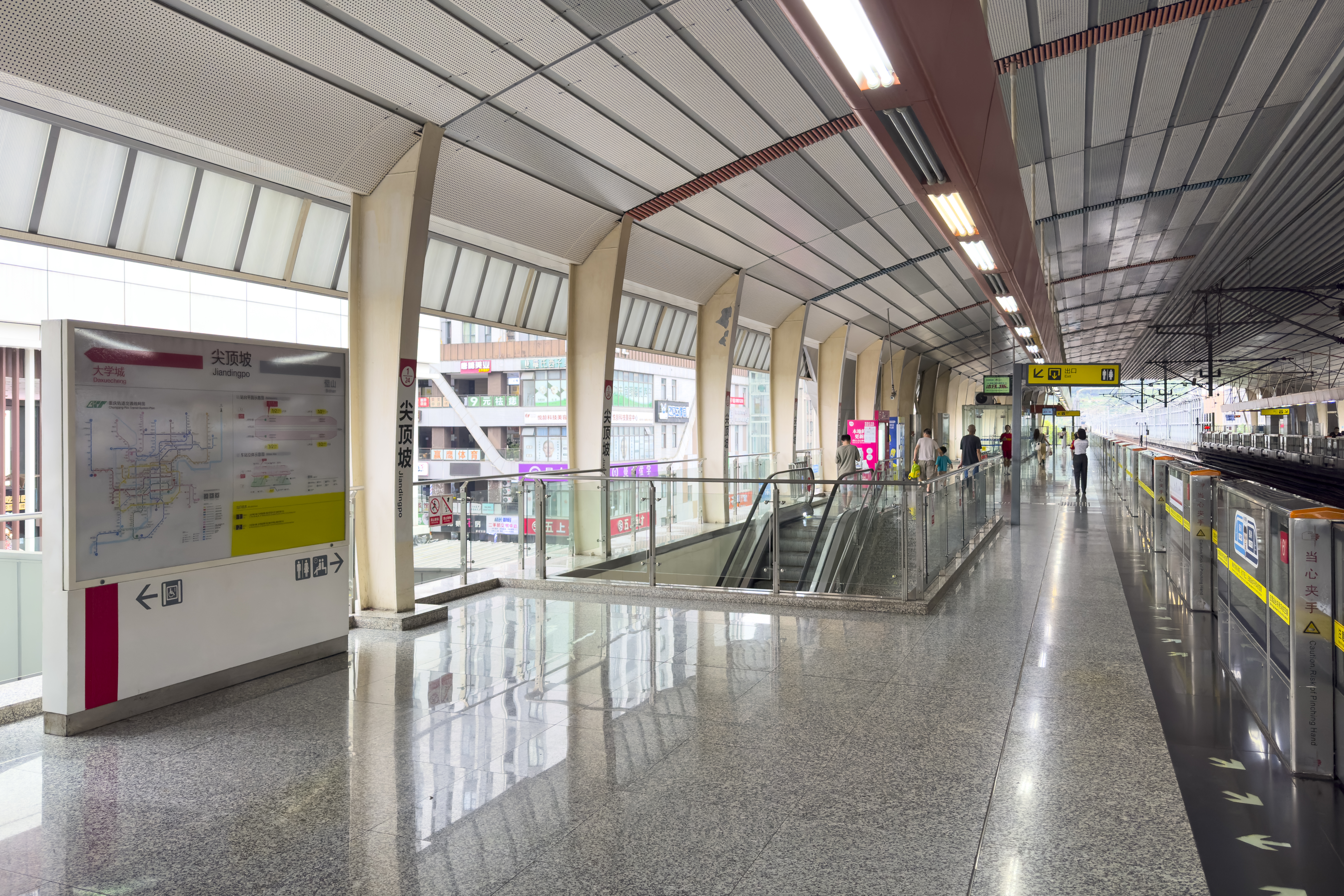

General information
- Location: Chongqing; China
- Coordinates: 29.6100°N 106.2892°E
- Operated by: Chongqing Rail Transit Corp., Ltd
- Line: Line 1
- Platforms: 2 side platforms

Construction
- Structure type: Elevated

Other information
- Station code: /

History
- Opened: 30 December 2014; 11 years ago

Services
Preceding station	Chongqing Rail Transit	Following station
Daxuecheng towards Chaotianmen	Line 1	Bishan Terminus
Location

Jiandingpo is a station on Line 1 of Chongqing Rail Transit in Chongqing Municipality, China. It is located in Shapingba District. It opened in 2014.

== Station structure ==
3F; Platforms	Side platform
3F; Platforms	Line 1 to Bishan (Terminus)
3F; Platforms	Line 1 to Chaotianmen (Daxuecheng)
3F; Platforms	Side platform
2F; Concourse	Exits, Customer service, Vending machines, Toilets
