= Chongqing Suburban Railway =

Commuter rail system in Chongqing, China

Overview
- Native name: 重庆市郊铁路
- Locale: Chongqing, China
- Transit type: Commuter rail, rapid transit
- Website: http://www.cqrailway.com

Operation
- Operators: Chongqing Railway Group Co, Ltd

Technical
- Track gauge: 1,435 mm (4 ft 8 1/2 in)
- Electrification: 25 kV AC overhead line
- Top speed: 120 km/h (75 mph) – 200 km/h (120 mph)

Chongqing Suburban Railway
- Simplified Chinese: 重庆市郊铁路
- Traditional Chinese: 重慶市郊鐵路
Transcriptions
Standard Mandarin
- Hanyu Pinyin: Chóngqìng Shìjiāo Tiělù
other Mandarin
- Sichuanese Pinyin: Cong^{2}qin^{4} Si^{4}jiao^{1} Tie^{2}nu^{4}

Chongqing Suburban Railway is a commuter rail transit system in Chongqing, China. According to the Comprehensive Transport Plan of Chongqing Main City Zone, the system has a total of 14 lines.

== Network ==
Line		Termini		Max speed km/h (mph)	Tracks	Length km	Stations	Start of construction	Opening	Notes
(Note: Formerly S5)	Jiangtiao (Note: Through service with Line 5 (Chongqing Rail Transit))	Tiaodeng	Shengquansi	120 (75)	2	26.7	7	2014	2022	
(Note: Formerly S5)	Jiangtiao	Shengquansi	Dingshan	120 (75)	2	4.6	2	2022	2027	
C1	Yuhe	Moxinpo	Weituo	160 (99)	2	49.5	5	2016	Suspended	
C2	Bitong	Bishan	Tongliangxi	140 (87)	2	37.5	9	2019	2025	
C3	Dazu	Bicheng	Dazu Rock Carvings	160 (99)	2	57.2	9	TBA	TBA	
C4	Yongchuan	Chongqingxi Railway Station	Yongchuanxi	160 (99)	2	71.8	16	2025	TBA	
C5	Qijiang–Wansheng	Xuetangwan	Wansheng	160 (99)	2	78.1	13	TBA	TBA	
C6	Nanchuan	Huimin	Jinfo Mountain	160 (99)	2	77.0	8	TBA	TBA	
C8	Heyong	Huangniba	Yongchuannan	160 (99)	1	95.0	8	TBA	TBA	

== See also ==
- Chongqing Rail Transit
