= Xiaoshizi station =

Metro station in Chongqing, China

Xiaoshizi 小什字
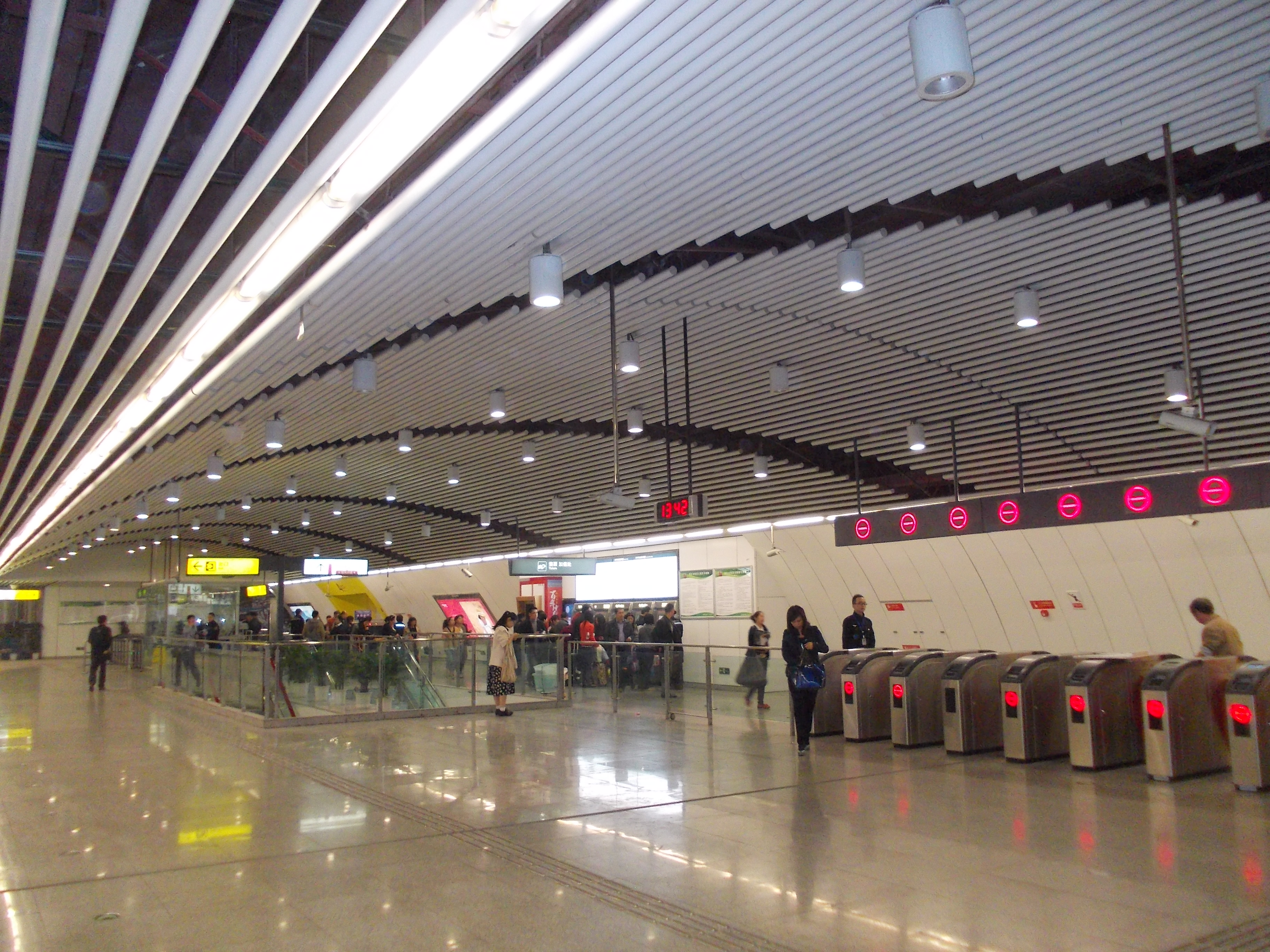
- Concourse of Line 1

General information
- Location: Yuzhong District, Chongqing; China
- Coordinates: 29°33′46.728″N 106°34′48.036″E
- Operated by: Chongqing Rail Transit Corp., Ltd
- Lines: Line 1 Line 6 Line 18
- Platforms: 4 (1 island platform and 2 side platforms)

Construction
- Structure type: Underground

Other information
- Station code: / /

History
- Opened: 27 September 2011; 14 years ago (Line 1); 30 December 2014; 11 years ago (Line 6); 28 December 2026; 6 months' time (Line 18)

Services
Preceding station	Chongqing Rail Transit	Following station
Chaotianmen Terminus	Line 1	Jiaochangkou towards Bishan
Shangxinjie towards Chayuan	Line 6	Grand Theater towards Beibei
Future service
Terminus	Line 18	Kaixuanlu towards Tiaodengnan
Location

Xiaoshizi is an interchange station between Line 1, Line 6 and Line 18 of Chongqing Rail Transit in Chongqing Municipality, China, which opened in 2011. It is located in Yuzhong District.

== Station structure ==
=== Line 1 ===
B1; Concourse	Exits 1-5, Customer service, Vending machines, Transfer passage to Line 6
B2; Platforms	Line 1 to Bishan (Jiaochangkou)
B2; Platforms	Island platform
B2; Platforms	Line 1 to Chaotianmen (Terminus)

=== Line 6 ===
B2; Concourse	Exits 6-9, Customer service, Vending machines, Transfer passage to Line 1
B3; Platforms	Side platform
B3; Platforms	Line 6 to Beibei (Grand Theater)
B3; Platforms	Line 6 to Chayuan (Shangxinjie)
B3; Platforms	Side platform

== Gallery ==
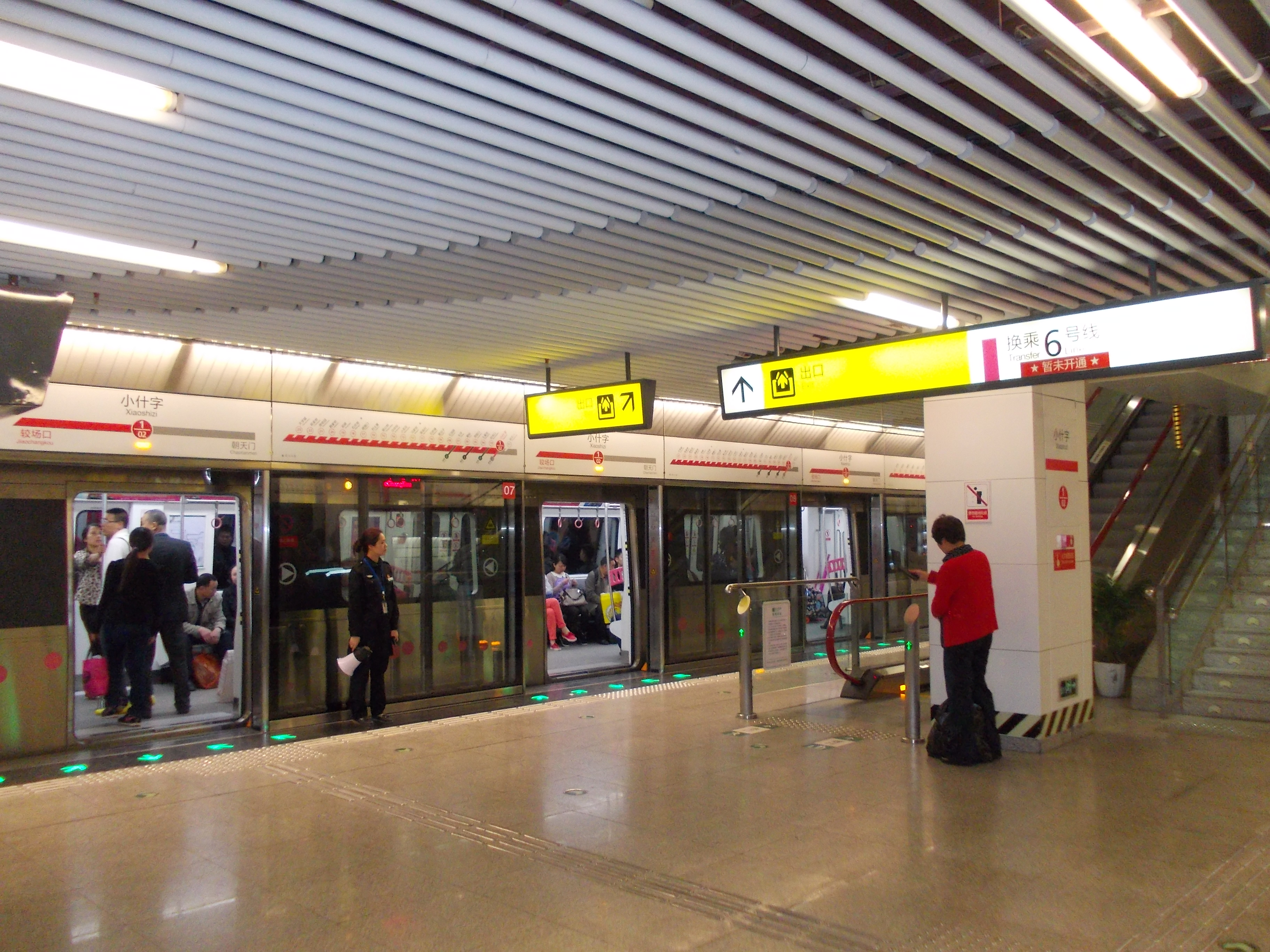
Line 1 platform

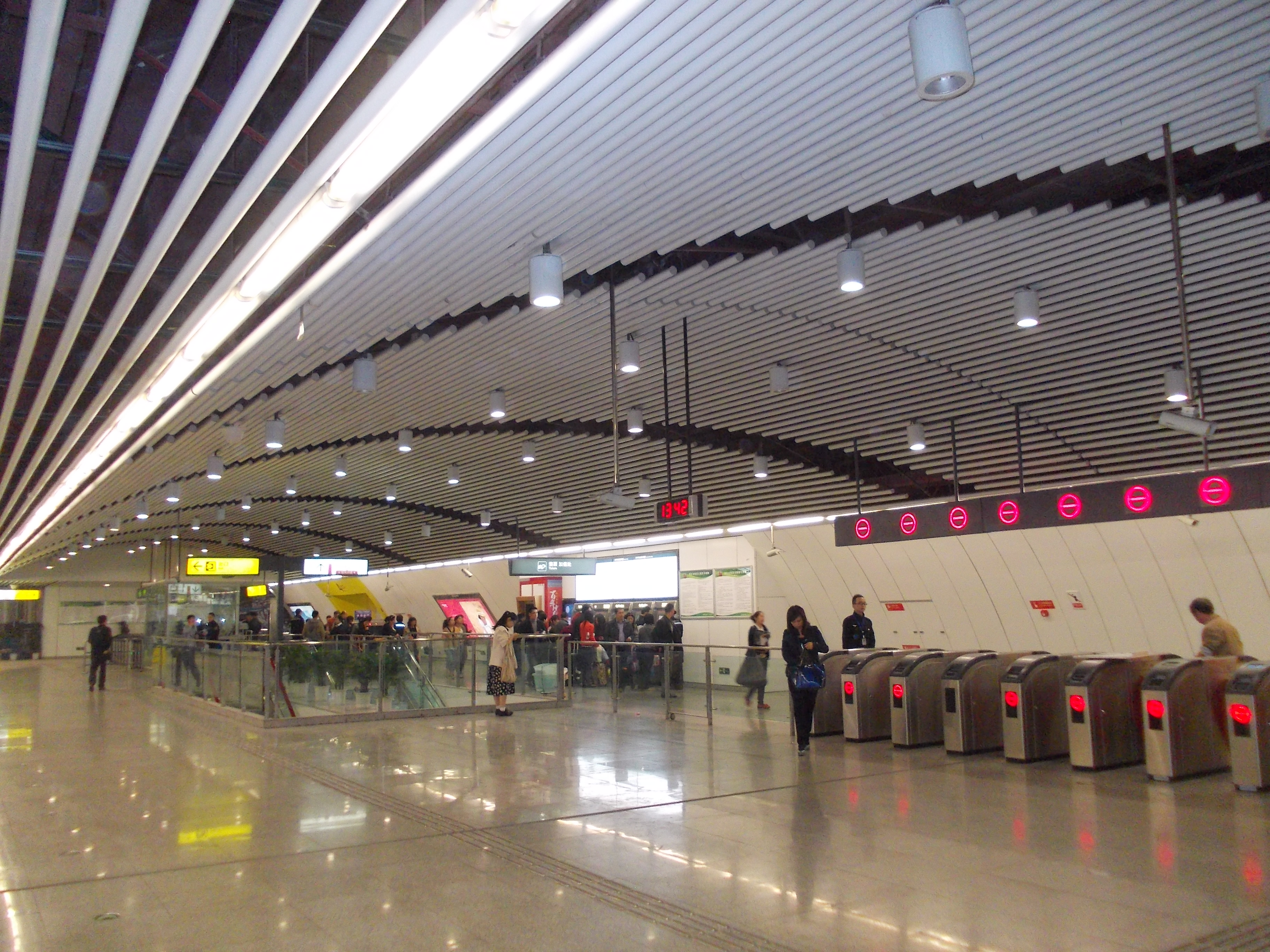
Line 1 concourse

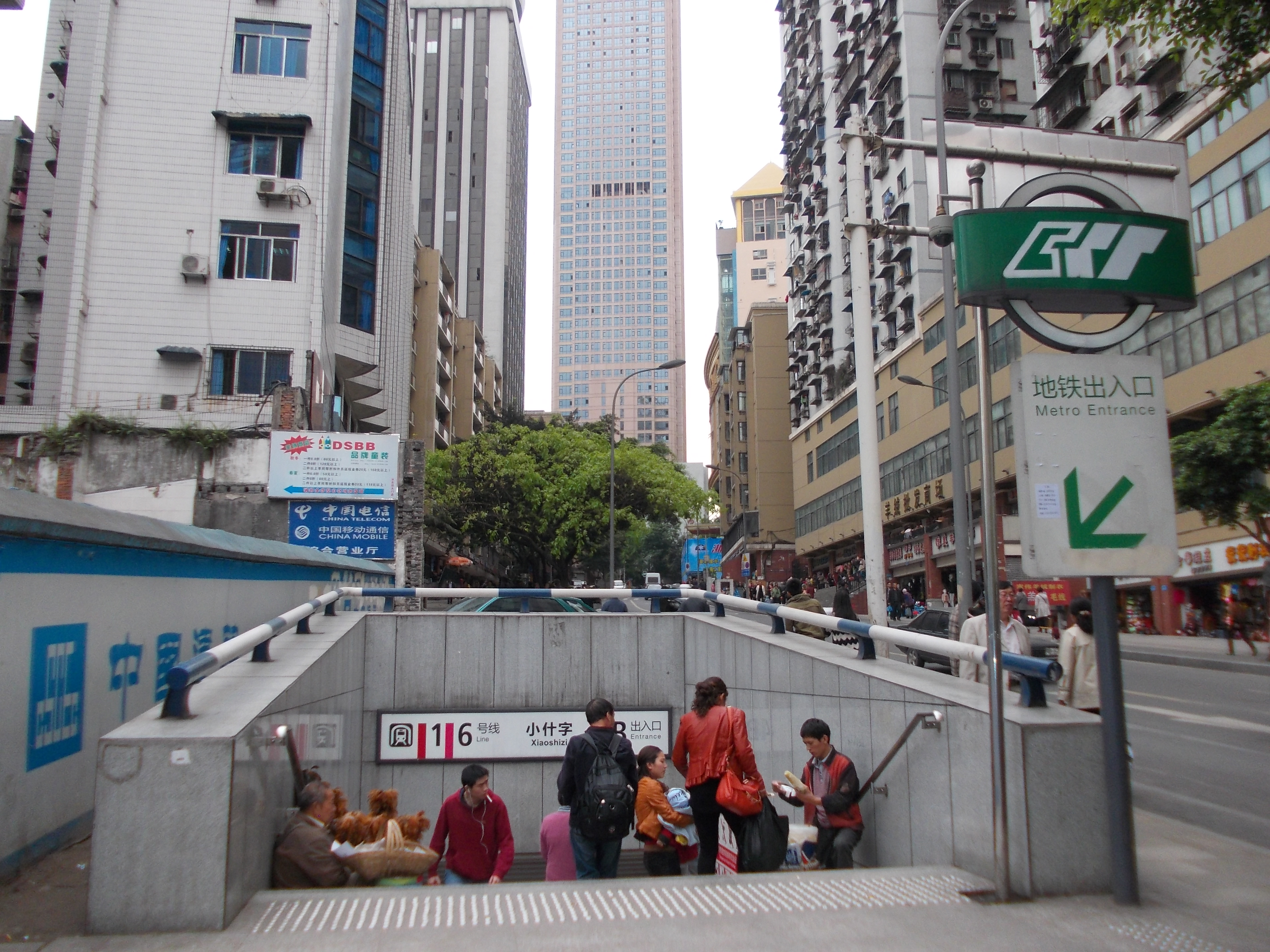
Exit 4B
