= Bitong line =

Suburban railway line in Chongqing, China

Overview
- Other names: Line C2; Bishan-Tongliang line
- Native name: 重庆市郊铁路璧铜线
- Status: Operational
- Locale: Chongqing, China
- Termini: Bishan; Tongliangxi
- Stations: 9 (8 in operation)

Service
- Type: Rapid transit
- System: Chongqing Rail Transit; Chongqing Suburban Railway

History
- Opened: January 2, 2025; 22 months ago

Technical
- Line length: 37.5 km (23.3 miles)
- Num of tracks: 2
- Track gauge: 1,435 mm (4 ft 8 1/2 in)
- Electrification: 25 kV AC Overhead line
- Operating speed: 140 km/h (87 mph)

The Bitong line of the Chongqing Suburban Railway is a suburban rapid transit line in Chongqing, China. It connects Tongliangxi in Tongliang District with Bishan station of the Chongqing Rail Transit, providing an interchange with Line 1 and through running with Line 27 in the future. It is 37.5 km long and features 9 stations.

Construction began in 2019. It opened on January 2, 2025 after a week of trial operation.

== Opening timeline ==
Segment	Commencement	Length	Station(s)	Name
Bishan – Tongliangxi	January 2, 2025	37.5 km (23.30 mi)	9	Initial section

== Stations ==
Route of Bitong line

Service routes		Station No.	Station name		Connections	Distance km		Location
Service routes		Station No.	English	Chinese	Connections	Distance km		Location
	↑	Through-service to/from Huimin via Line 27						
●	●	/	Bishan	璧山	Line 1 Bishan SkyShuttle	-	0	Bishan
●	●	/	Bicheng	璧城				Bishan
●	●	/	Hebian	河边				Bishan
●	●	/	Qinglonghu (Under Construction)	青龙湖				Bishan
●	●	/	Dalu	大路				Bishan
●	●	/	Qinglong	庆隆				Tongliang
●	●	/	Sci-Tech Innovation Center	科创新城				Tongliang
●	●	/	Tongliang Longcheng Paradise Walk	铜梁龙城天街				Tongliang
●	●	/	Tongliangxi	铜梁西				Tongliang
