= Line 1 (Chongqing Rail Transit) =

Metro line of Chongqing Rail Transit

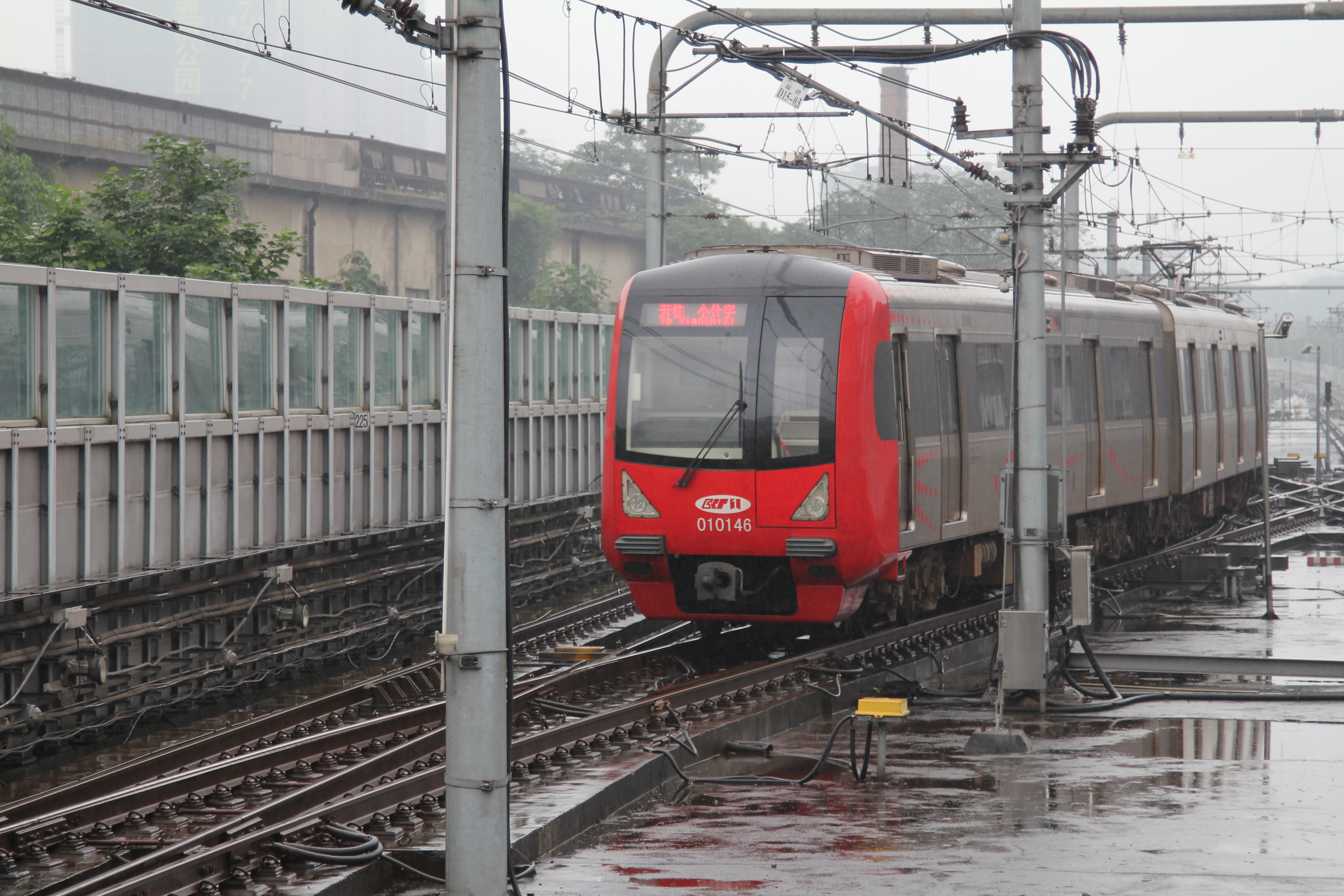
- A train of Line 1 at Shuangbei station

Overview
- Termini: Chaotianmen; Bishan
- Stations: 25

Service
- Type: Rapid transit
- System: Chongqing Rail Transit
- Operator: Chongqing Rail Transit Corporation Limited
- Daily ridership: 690,000 (2016 Peak)

History
- Opened: 28 July 2011; 15 years ago

Technical
- Line length: 43.71 km (27.16 mi)
- Operating speed: 100 km/h (62 mph) (peak)

Line 1 of CRT runs westwards from Chaotianmen to Bishan. Line 1 began operation on 28 July 2011.

Line 1 runs 16.4 km (10.2 mi) from Chaotianmen in downtown Chongqing west to Shapingba, and eventually all the way to Shuangbei for a total length of 22.4 km (13.9 mi). It is the city's first all-heavy rail metro line and the second completed in Western China. Passenger capacity of the line is 36,000 passengers/hour/direction.

In 1992, the Chongqing government had signed a Build-Operate-Transfer in 1992 with a Hong Kong company, and provided the land for the project, but work ceased in 1997 due to legal issues. Work resumed on the first stretch of the line (from Chaotianmen to Shapingba) on 9 June 2007, and opened to limited operation on July 28. An extension from Shapingba to Daxuecheng (University Town) began in 2009 and opened on December 21, 2012 before receiving a short extension from Daxuecheng to Jiandingpo a year later. And an extension, running from Jiandingpo to Bishan also opened on December 30, 2019, making Line 1 the first CRT line to reach areas outside Metropolitan Chongqing. The latest extension from Xiaoshizi to Chaotianmen has been opened on 31 December 2020, making Line 1 a completely finished subway line.

Line 1 has 25 stations, including from east to west: Chaotianmen, Xiaoshizi, Jiaochangkou, Qixinggang, Lianglukou, Eling, Daping, Shiyoulu, Xietaizi, Shiqiaopu, Gaomiaocun, Majiayan, Xiaolongkan, Shapingba, Yanggongqiao, Lieshimu, Ciqikou, Shijingpo, Shuangbei, Laijiaqiao, Weidianyuan, Chenjiaqiao, Daxuecheng (University Town), Jiandingpo and Bishan stations.

Line 1 has transfer interchange stations with Line 6 at Xiaoshizi and Line 2 at Jiaochangkou in Jiefangbei CBD and at Daping and Line 3 at Lianglukou, which is near Chongqing railway station in central Yuzhong. Line 1 is also transferable with the Loop Line at Shapingba, although out-of-station transfer is currently needed due to construction setbacks on the interchange channel and concourse connecting the two subway lines.

== Opening timeline ==
Segment	Commencement	Length	Station(s)	Name
Jiaochangkou – Shapingba	28 July 2011	14.2 km (8.82 mi)	10	Phase 1 (initial section)
Xiaoshizi – Jiaochangkou	27 September 2011	1.4 km (0.87 mi)	1	Phase 1 (remaining section)
Gaomiaocun	17 November 2011	Infill station	1	
Shapingba – Daxuecheng	20 December 2012	19.7 km (12.24 mi)	7	Phase 2
Weidianyuan	28 March 2013	Infill station	1	
Majiayan	25 September 2013	Infill station	1	
Shijingpo	28 September 2014	Infill station	1	
Daxuecheng – Jiandingpo	30 December 2014	1.9 km (1.18 mi)	1	Extension of Phase 2
Jiandingpo – Bishan	30 December 2019	5.6 km (3.48 mi)	1	Extension to Bishan
Xiaoshizi – Chaotianmen	31 December 2020	0.8 km (0.50 mi)	1	Extension to Chaotianmen

== Service routes ==
Route of Line 1

In the past, besides the full-route service (Chaotianmen – Bishan), Line 1 also had a short-turn service (Chaotianmen – Shuangbei), but it was canceled in November 2025.

== Stations ==
Station №	Station name		Connections	Distance km		Location
Station №	English	Chinese	Connections	Distance km		Location
/	Chaotianmen	朝天门		-	0.00	Yuzhong
/	Xiaoshizi	小什字	Line 6 18	0.66	0.66	Yuzhong
/	Jiaochangkou	较场口	Line 2	1.36	2.02	Yuzhong
/	Qixinggang	七星岗	Line 10 18	0.85	2.87	Yuzhong
/	Lianglukou	两路口	Line 3 CQW	1.44	4.30	Yuzhong
/	Eling	鹅岭		1.60	5.90	Yuzhong
/	Daping	大坪	Line 2	1.73	7.63	Yuzhong
/	Shiyoulu	石油路		1.16	8.79	Yuzhong
/	Xietaizi	歇台子	Line 5 Line 18	1.03	9.82	Jiulongpo
/	Shiqiaopu	石桥铺	Line 5 27	1.25	11.07	Jiulongpo
/	Gaomiaocun	高庙村		1.68	12.75	Shapingba
/	Majiayan	马家岩		1.20	13.95	Shapingba
/	Xiaolongkan	小龙坎	Line 9	1.09	15.03	Shapingba
/	Shapingba	沙坪坝	Line 9 Loop line 27; CYW	0.87	15.90	Shapingba
/	Yanggongqiao	杨公桥		1.17	17.08	Shapingba
/	Lieshimu	烈士墓		0.82	17.90	Shapingba
/	Ciqikou	磁器口	27	1.05	18.95	Shapingba
/	Shijingpo	石井坡		1.40	20.35	Shapingba
/	Shuangbei	双碑		1.90	22.25	Shapingba
/	Laijiaqiao	赖家桥		7.00	29.25	Shapingba
/	Weidianyuan	微电园	7	1.77	31.02	Shapingba
/	Chenjiaqiao	陈家桥	15	3.35	34.37	Shapingba
/	Daxuecheng	大学城	17	1.90	36.27	Shapingba
/	Jiandingpo	尖顶坡		1.55	37.81	Shapingba
/	Bishan	璧山	Bitong line Bishan SkyShuttle (Note: Out of system transfer); 27	5.90	43.71	Bishan
