= Yongchuan line =

Future metro line in Chongqing, China

Overview
- Other names: Line C4; Chongqing-Yongchuan Suburban Railway
- Status: Under construction
- Owner: Chongqing Rail Transit
- Locale: Chongqing, China
- Termini: Yongchuan West; Chongqing West Station
- Stations: 17 (including 2 stations are reserved)

Service
- Type: Rapid transit, Suburban railway
- System: Chongqing Rail Transit, Chongqing Suburban Railway
- Operator(s): Chongqing Railway Group Co., Ltd.

Technical
- Line length: 68.33 km (42.46 mi)
- Num of tracks: 2
- Track gauge: 1,435 mm (4 ft 8 1/2 in)
- Electrification: 25 kV AC 50 Hz Overhead catenary contact
- Operating speed: 140 km/h (87 mph) (Maximum design speed)

The Yongchuan Line, also known as Line C4 or Chongqing-Yongchuan Suburban Railway is an under construction suburban metro line connecting Chongqing and Yongchuan, China. Once completed, this line will be through direct service via Line 15 and Line 26.

== Overview ==
With a total investment of 29.2 billion RMB, this line starts at Yongchuan West and ends at Chongqing West station with a total length of 68.33 km (42.46 mi). There are total of 17 stations (4 are underground, 1 is above ground and 12 are elevated), including 2 stations are reserved with a maximum speed of 140 km/h and total travel time between terminal is approximately 50 minutes. A set of 22 rolling stock 4 car type B will be used. In short and long term planning, a mixed operation mode of 4-car/6-car trains will be adopted.

Among the length of 68.33 km (42.46 mi) on the line, about 34.23 km (21.27 mi) runs on elevated section, 27.07 km (16.82 mi) runs on tunnel section and 7.03 km (4.37 mi) runs on roadbed section. The main construction includes 3 new 110kV main subtstaions and 2 depots..

== History ==
On 22 September 2022, the project began feasibility planning and survey and design work.

The first section was kicked off on 29 March 2023.

On 21 April 2025, the first public announcement for the environmental impact assessment for Yongchuan Line was held.

== Stations ==
Section	Station name		Transfer	Distance km	Location
Section	English	Chinese	Transfer	Distance km	Location
Phase 3	Yongchuan West	永川西			Yongchuan
Phase 2	Huilong	汇龙			Yongchuan
Phase 2	Sports Center	体育中心			Yongchuan
Phase 2	Chenshi	陈食			Yongchuan
Phase 2	Technology Ecological City	科技生态城			Yongchuan
Phase 2	Da'an	大安			Yongchuan
Phase 2	Bishan Airport	璧山机场			Bishan
Phase 2	Dingjia	丁家			Bishan
Phase 2	Laifeng	来凤			Bishan
Phase 2	Qinggangxi	青杠西			Bishan
Phase 2	Qinggang	青杠			Bishan
Phase 1	Jinfeng West	金凤西	Line 15 (planned)		Jiulongpo
Phase 1	↓ Through service via Line 15				Jiulongpo
Phase 1	?	石家院子	Line 17		Jiulongpo
Phase 1	Jiulicun	九里村			Jiulongpo
Phase 1	Xicheng Park	西城公园	Line 7		Jiulongpo
Phase 1	Baishiyi	白市驿	Line 19 (planned)		Jiulongpo
Phase 1	Chongqing West Station	重庆西站	Loop line Line 5 Line 12 (planned); Line 26 (planned)		Shapingba
↓ Through service via Line 26
