= Chaotianmen station =

Metro station in Chongqing, China

Chaotianmen 朝天门
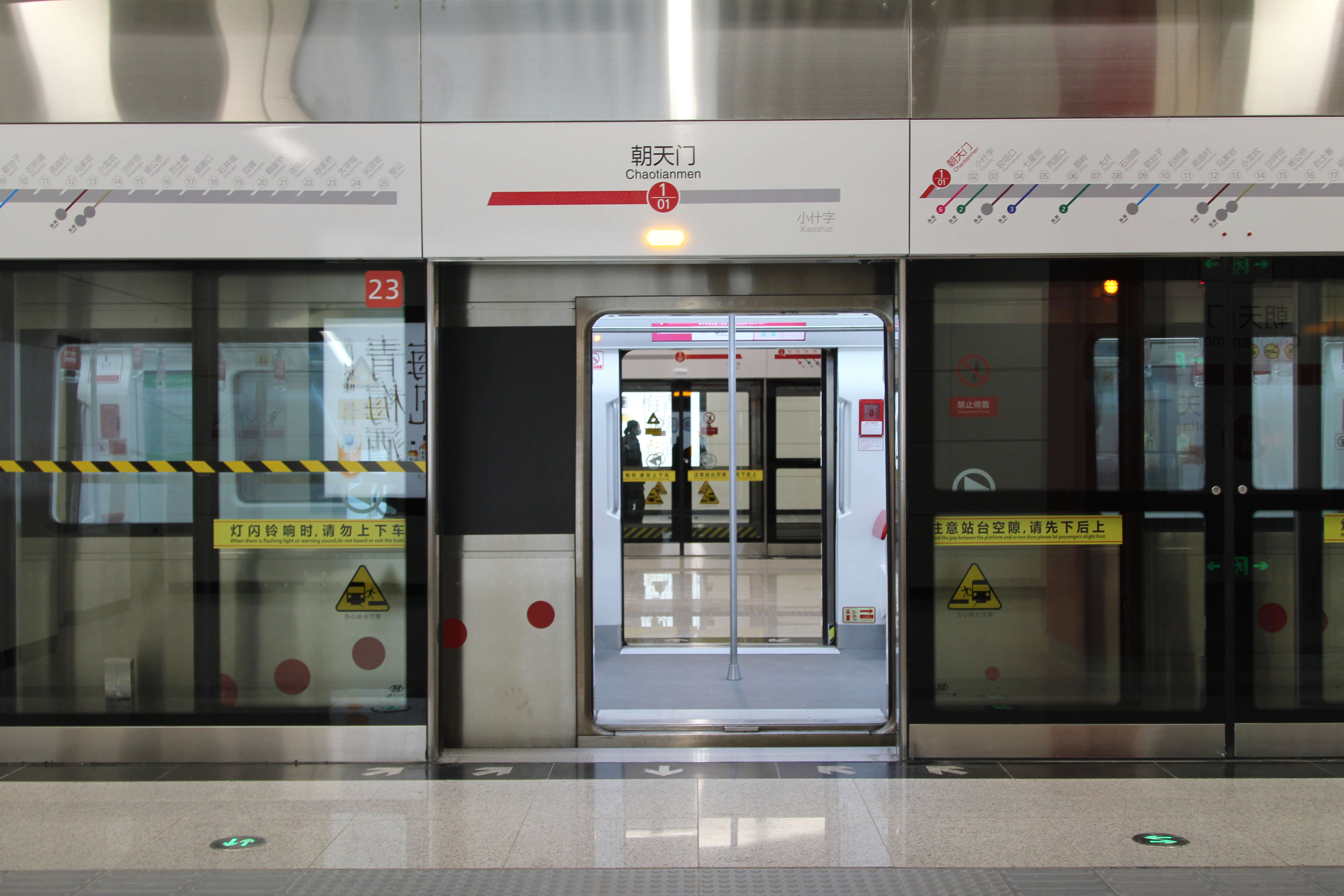

Chinese name
- Traditional Chinese: 朝天門
- Simplified Chinese: 朝天门
- Hanyu Pinyin: Cháotiānmén
- Literal meaning: 'Sky-Facing Gate'
Transcriptions
Standard Mandarin
- Hanyu Pinyin: Cháotiānmén
- Wade–Giles: Ch‘ao^{2}-t‘ien^{1}-mên^{2}
- IPA: [ʈʂʰǎʊ.tʰjɛ́n.mə̌n]
Yue: Cantonese
- Yale Romanization: Chìuhtīnmùhn
- Jyutping: ciu4 tin1 mun4
- IPA: [tsʰiw˩.tʰin˥.mun˩]

General information
- Location: Yuzhong District, Chongqing; China
- Coordinates: 29.56698°N 106.58226°E
- Operated by: Chongqing Rail Transit Corp., Ltd
- Line: Line 1
- Platforms: 4 (Spanish solution, 2 side platforms and 1 island platform)

Construction
- Structure type: Underground

Other information
- Station code: /

History
- Opened: 31 December 2020; 5 years ago

Services
Preceding station	Chongqing Rail Transit	Following station
Terminus	Line 1	Xiaoshizi towards Bishan
Location

Chaotianmen is a station on Line 1 of Chongqing Rail Transit in Chongqing Municipality, China. It is located in Yuzhong District and opened on 31 December 2020.

== Station structure ==
There are an island platform and two side platforms at this station, which adopts the Spanish solution to separate boarding and alighting passengers.

B1; Platforms	Side platform, for alighting passengers only
B1; Platforms	Line 1 to Bishan (Xiaoshizi)
B1; Platforms	Island platform, for boarding passengers only
B1; Platforms	Line 1 to Bishan (Xiaoshizi)
B1; Platforms	Side platform, for alighting passengers only
B2; Concourse	Exits, Customer service, Vending machines, Toilets
