= Bishan station (Chongqing Rail Transit) =

Metro station in Chongqing, China

Bishan 璧山
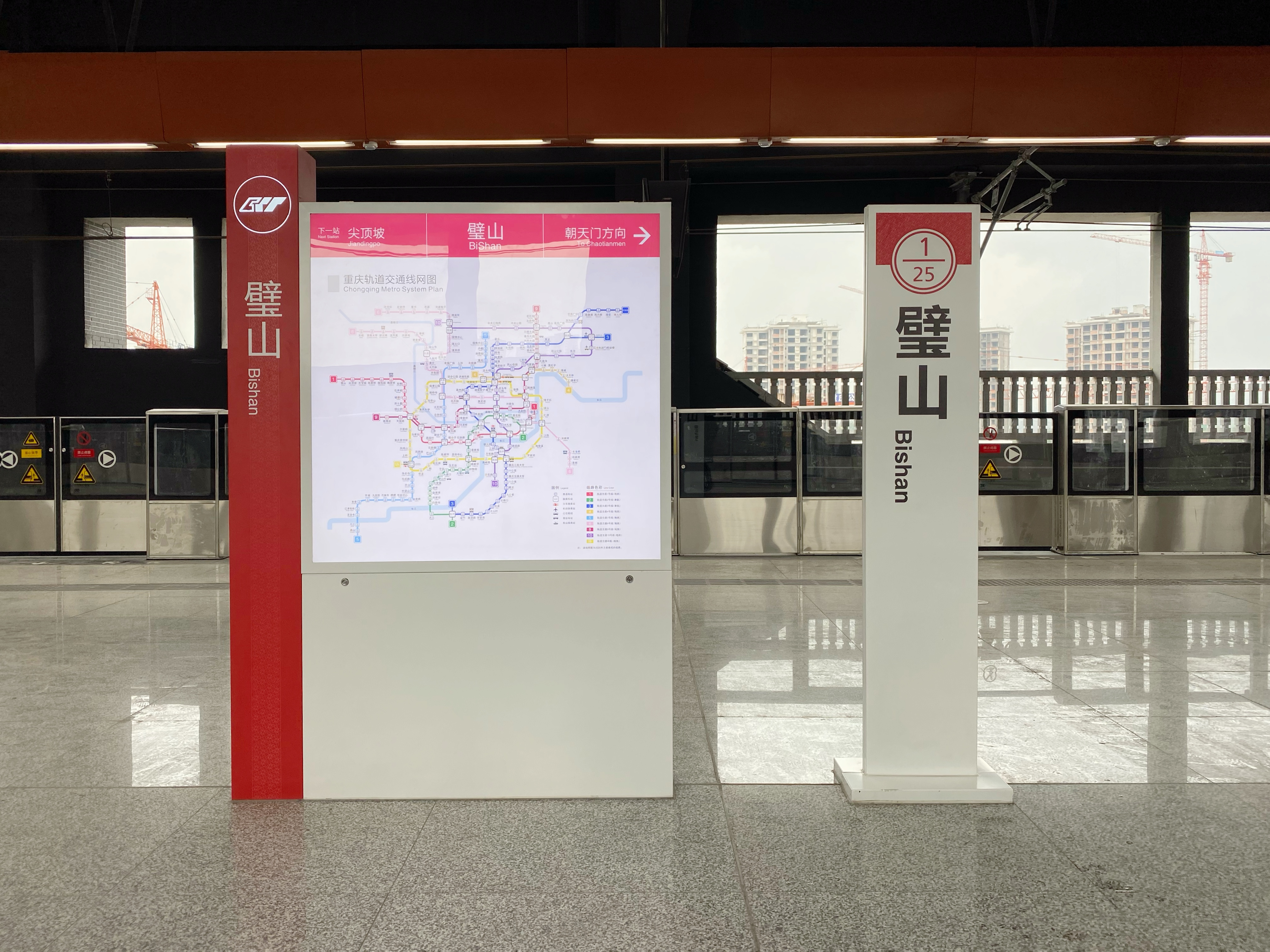
- Station platform

General information
- Location: Shuanglong Avenue, Bicheng Subdistrict, Bishan District, Chongqing; China
- Coordinates: 29.614882°N 106.228829°E
- Operated by: Chongqing Rail Transit Corp., Ltd
- Lines: Line 1 Bitong line (Bishan-Tongliang line); Line 27 (Under construction)
- Platforms: 4 (2 island platforms)
- Connections: Bishan Public Transport; Bishan SkyShuttle

Construction
- Structure type: Elevated
- Accessible: Yes (2 accessible elevators) (Line 1)

Other information
- Station code: / /

History
- Opened: 30 December 2019; 6 years ago (Line 1); 5 January 2025; 16 months ago (Bishan-Tongliang Line)

Services
Preceding station	Chongqing Rail Transit	Following station
Jiandingpo towards Chaotianmen	Line 1	Terminus
Bicheng towards Tongliang West	Bitong line	Terminus
Location

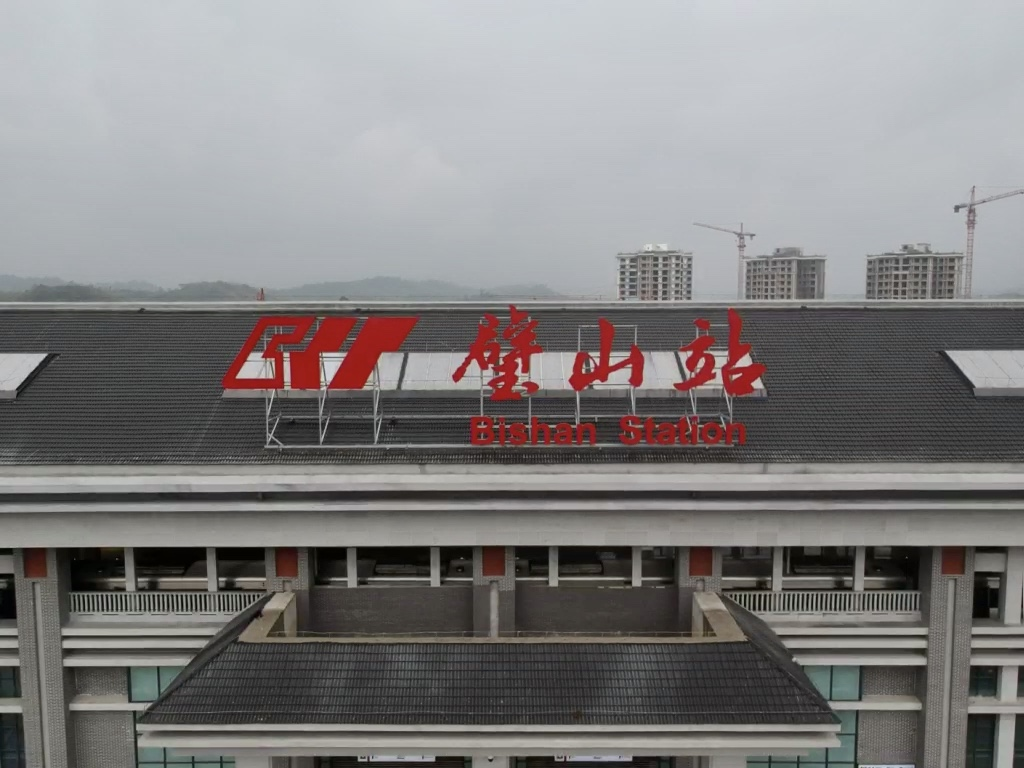
Station signage's appearance before changing to green

Bishan is an interchange station on Line 1 and the Bishan-Tongliang Line of Chongqing Rail Transit in Shuanglong Avenue, Bicheng Subdistrict, Bishan District, Chongqing Municipality, China. The station opened on December 30, 2019, and it became an interchange station on January 5, 2025. It is CRT's first station to be built outside of the Metropolitan Area of Chongqing.

== Connections ==
The metro station is connected to the northern terminus of the Bishan SkyShuttle.

== Station structure ==
=== Floors ===
F2
Line Line 1 Platform
Trains
F1
Line Line 1 Station Concourse

& Entrances/Exits

Ticket machines, Ticket gates, Customer service center, Accessible elevators, Escalators, Toilets
Exits 1, 2 & 3

=== Line 1 platform ===
An island platform is used for Line 1 trains. Line 1 trains can access the Bishan Metro Depot by using the railway junction. The station acts as a reversing station using its scissors crossover for trains to switch direction as their service to Bishan terminates.

Platform Layout

The railway junction is located on the left side of this diagram

To Line 1 Bishan Terminus	←	1/25	←
Crossover and rail to car depot	Island Platform Doors open on the left
	→	1/25	→	To Line 1 Chaotianmen Next Jiandingpo

=== Future connections with Line 27 ===
The Line 27 Bishan station is located to the north of the Line 1 Bishan station, linked to Line 1 via a paid walkway. After its completion, it will also connect to the Bishan-Tongliang Line.

== Exits ==
There are a total of 3 entrances/exits for the station.

Line	Exit Type	Exit	To
Line 1	Ground Level Exits	1	Liuqi Avenue (Six Flags Ave.), Jiguanshi Road
Line 1	Ground Level Exits	2	Liuqi Avenue (Six Flags Ave.), Yanhe West Road
Line 1	Ground Level Exits	3	Jiguanshi Road
