= Erlang =

Erlang may refer to:

== Science and technology ==
- Erlang (programming language), a programming language
- Erlang (unit), a unit to measure traffic in telecommunications or other domains
- Erlang distribution, a probability distribution describing the time between events

== Places in China ==
- Mount Erlang, a mountain in Sichuan
- Erlang, Susong County, a town in Susong County, Anhui
- Erlang, Taihe County, a town in Taihe County, Anhui
- Erlang, Hechuan District, a town in Hechuan District, Chongqing
- Erlang Subdistrict, Jiulongpo District, Chongqing
  - Erlang station, metro station in Erlang Subdistrict
- Erlang Township, in Cheng County, Gansu
- Erlang, Guizhou, a town in Xishui County, Guizhou
- Erlang, Henan, a town in Xiping County, Henan
- Erlang, Sichuan, a town in Gulin County, Sichuan
- Erlang railway station, on the Qinghai–Tibet Railway

== Other uses ==
- Agner Krarup Erlang (1878–1929), mathematician and engineer after whom several concepts are named
- Erlang Shen, a Chinese deity

== See also ==
- Erlangen, Germany
- Erlanger (disambiguation)
