= Olympic Sports Center station (Chongqing Rail Transit) =

Chongqing Rail Transit station

Olympic Sports Center 奥体中心
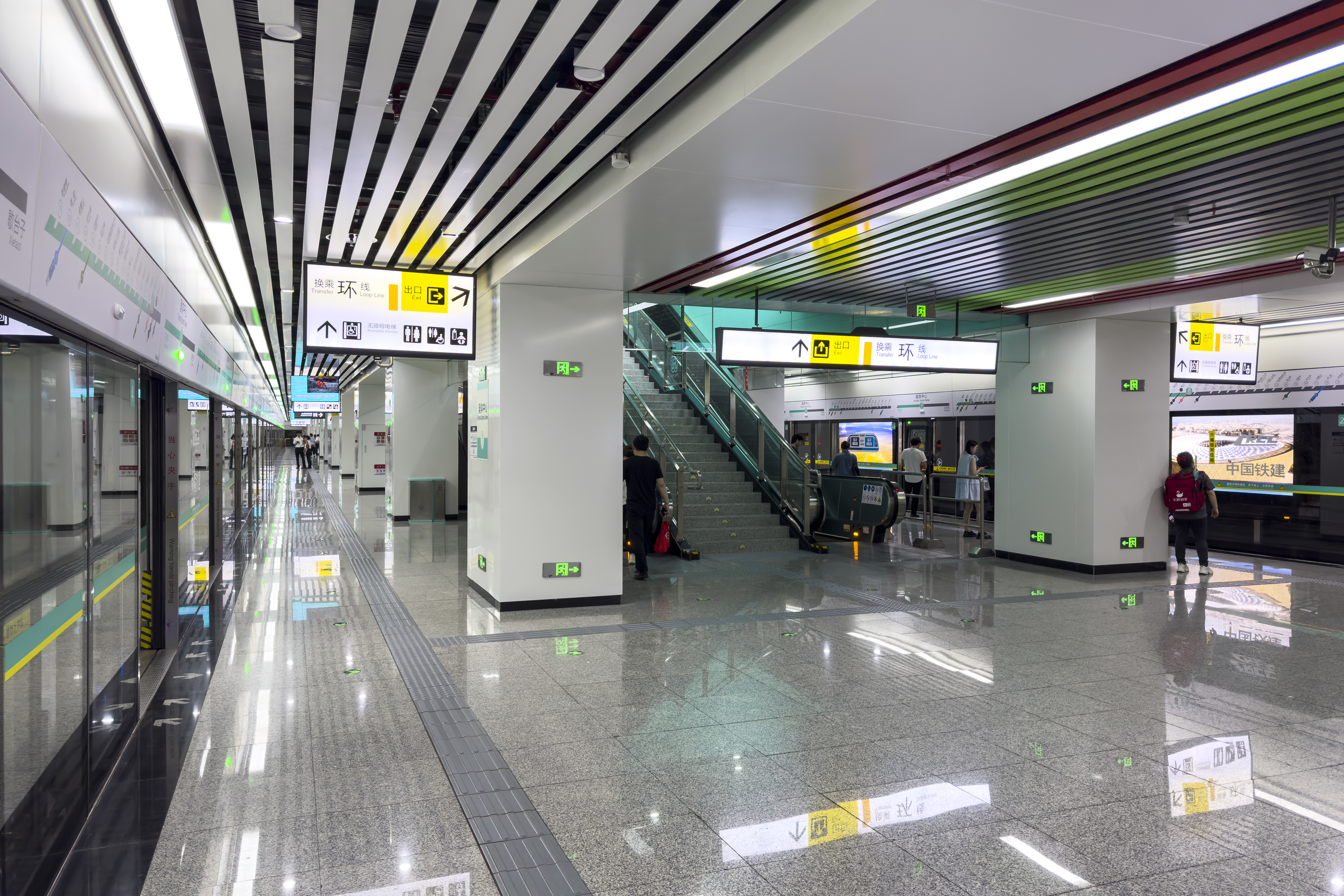
- Platform of Line 18

General information
- Location: Longteng Avenue; Jiulongpo District, Chongqing; China
- Coordinates: 29.5262°N 106.4987°E
- Operator: Chongqing Rail Transit Corp., Ltd
- Lines: Loop line Line 18
- Platforms: 4 (2 island platforms)

Construction
- Structure type: Underground
- Accessible: Yes

Other information
- Station code: / /

History
- Opened: 30 December 2019; 6 years ago (Line 0); 28 December 2023; 2 years ago (Line 18)

Services
Preceding station	Chongqing Rail Transit	Following station
Xiejiawan Counter-clockwise	Loop line	Chenjiaping Clockwise
Xietaizi towards Fuhualu	Line 18	Shipingqiao towards Tiaodengnan
Location

Olympic Sports Center Station is a station on the Loop line and Line 18 of Chongqing Rail Transit in Chongqing municipality, China. It is located in Jiulongpo District and opened in 2019.

== Loop line Platforms ==
F2; Platforms	Loop line counterclockwise loop (Xiejiawan)
F2; Platforms	Island platform
F2; Platforms	Loop line clockwise loop (Chenjiaping)

== Line 18 Platforms ==
F2; Platforms	Line 18 to Xiaoshizi (Xietaizi)
F2; Platforms	Island platform
F2; Platforms	Line 18 to Tiaodengnan (Shipingqiao)
