= Chongqing Railway High School =

Secondary school in Chongqing, China

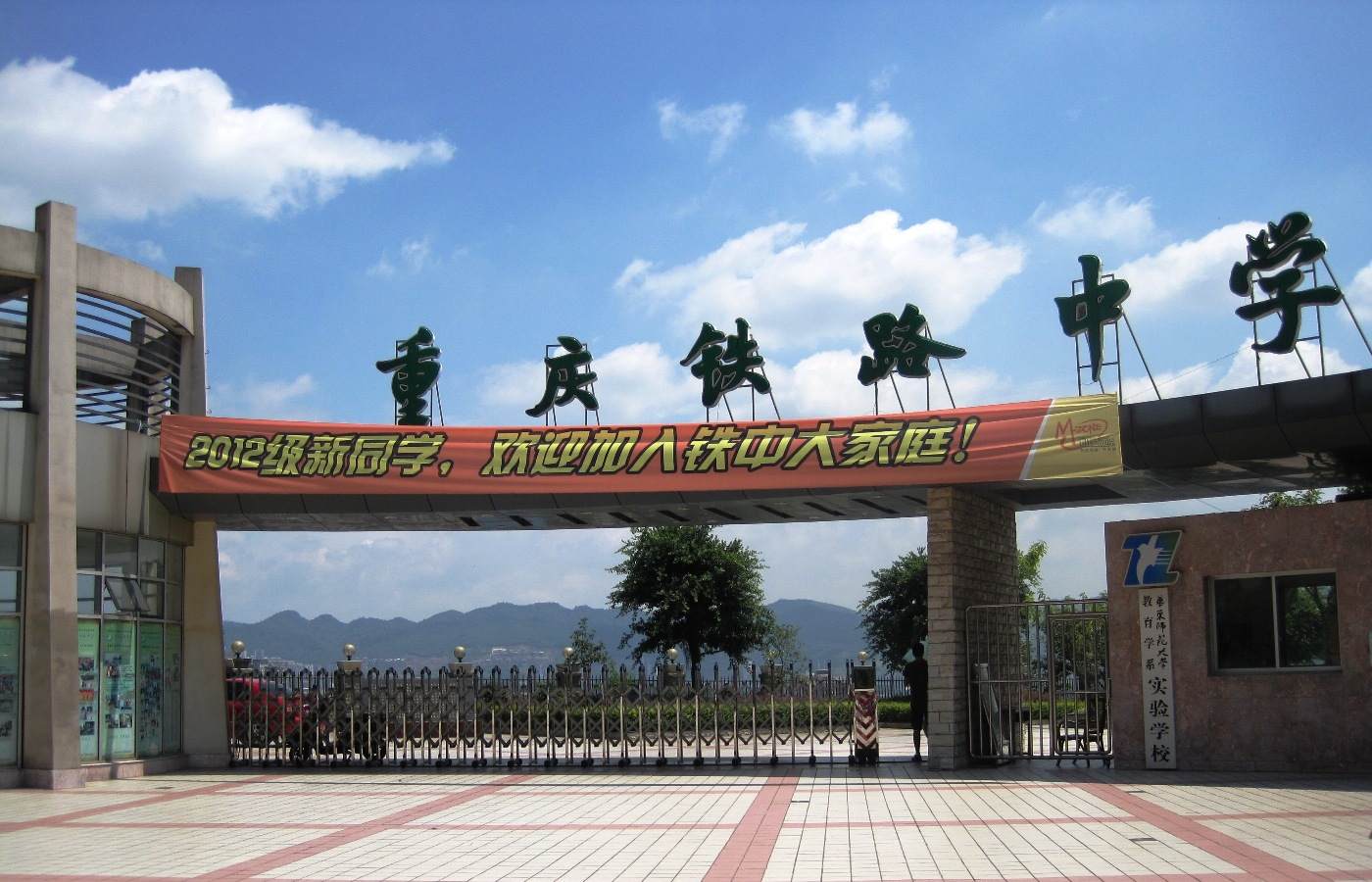
Chongqing Railway High School

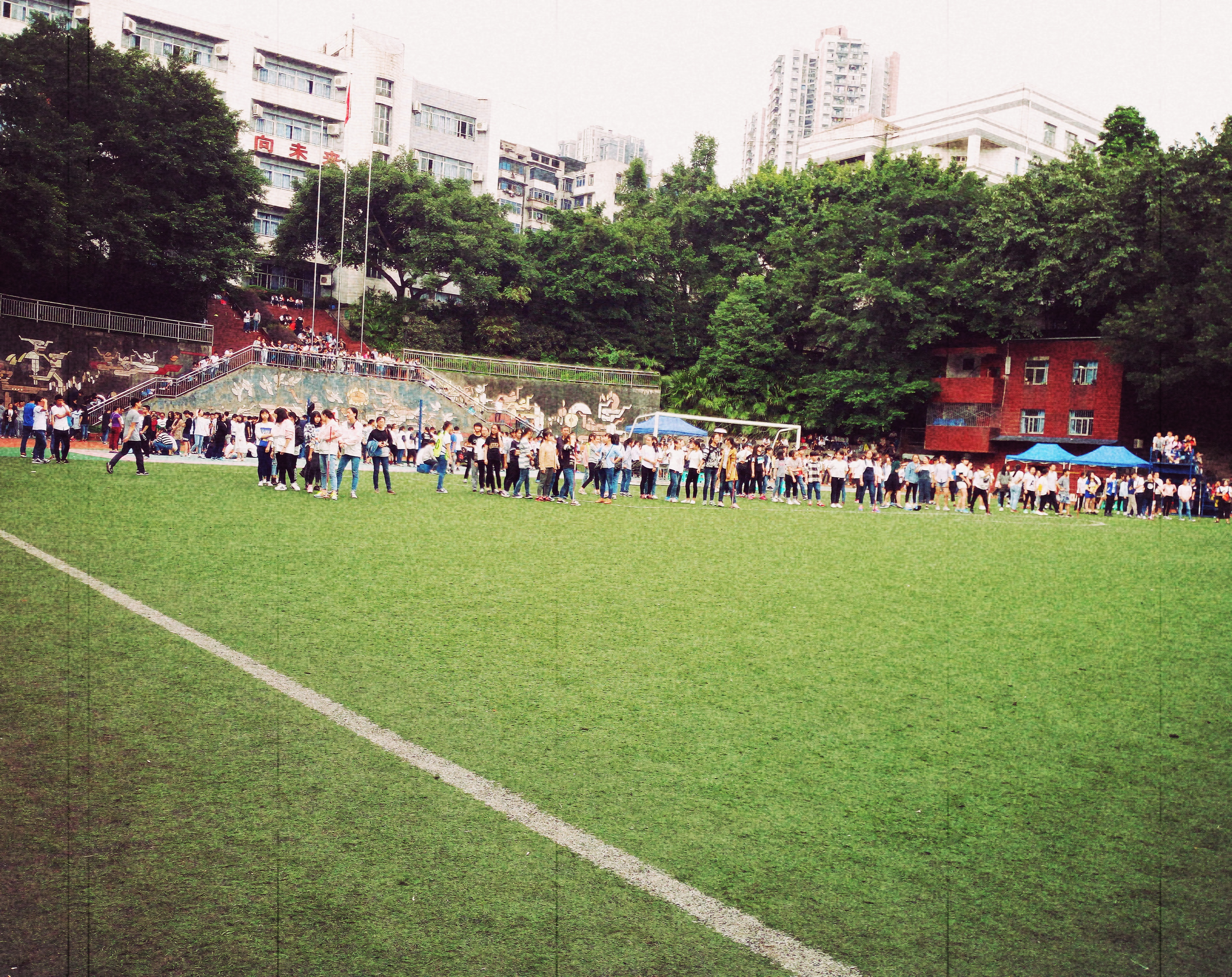

Chongqing Railway High School (simplified Chinese: 重庆铁路中学; traditional Chinese: 重慶鐵路中學; pinyin: Chóng qìng tiě lù zhōng xué) is a public high school in Chongqing, People's Republic of China. Founded in 1956, it was one of the first key schools in Chongqing.

The campus is located in the center of the Jiulongpo district.
