= Bashan station =

Chongqing Rail Transit station

Bashan 巴山
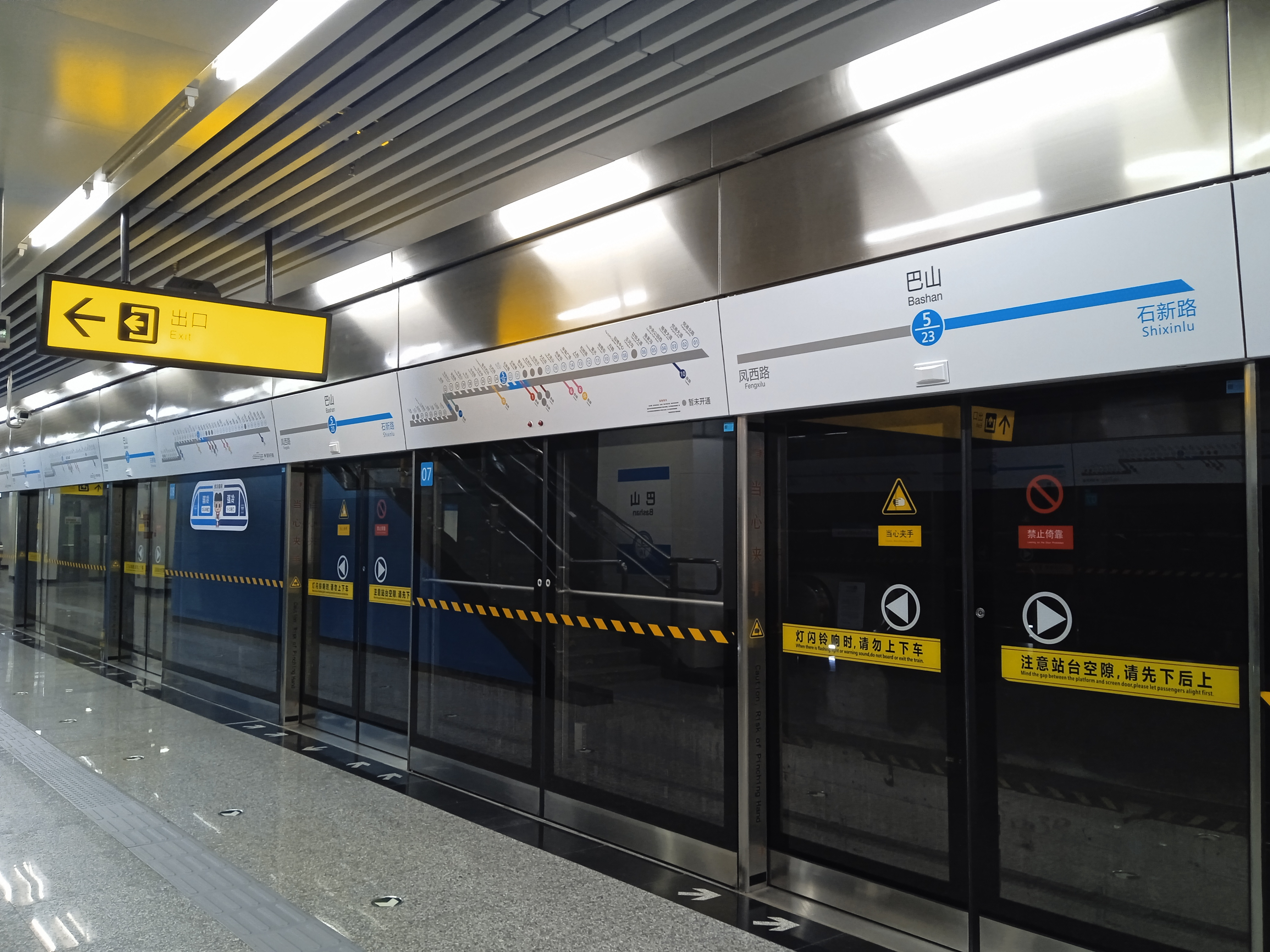

General information
- Location: Chongqing; China
- Coordinates: 29.523222°N 106.465569°E
- Operated by: Chongqing Rail Transit Corp., Ltd
- Line: Line 5
- Platforms: 4 (2 island platforms)

Construction
- Structure type: Underground

Other information
- Station code: /

History
- Opened: 20 January 2021; 5 years ago

Services
Preceding station	Chongqing Rail Transit	Following station
Shixinlu towards Yuegangbeilu	Line 5	Fengxilu towards Tiaodeng
Location

Bashan Station is a station on Line 5 of Chongqing Rail Transit in Chongqing municipality, China. It is located in Jiulongpo District and opened in 2021.

== Station structure ==
There are two island platforms at this station, but only two inner ones are currently in use, while the other two outer ones are reserved.

B1; Concourse	Exits, Customer service, Vending machines
B2; Platforms	No regular service
B2; Platforms	Island platform
B2; Platforms	Line 5 to Yuegangbeilu (Shixinlu)
B2; Platforms	Line 5 to Tiaodeng (Fengxilu)
B2; Platforms	Island platform
B2; Platforms	No regular service
