= Shipingqiao station =

Metro station in Chongqing, China

Shipingqiao 石坪桥
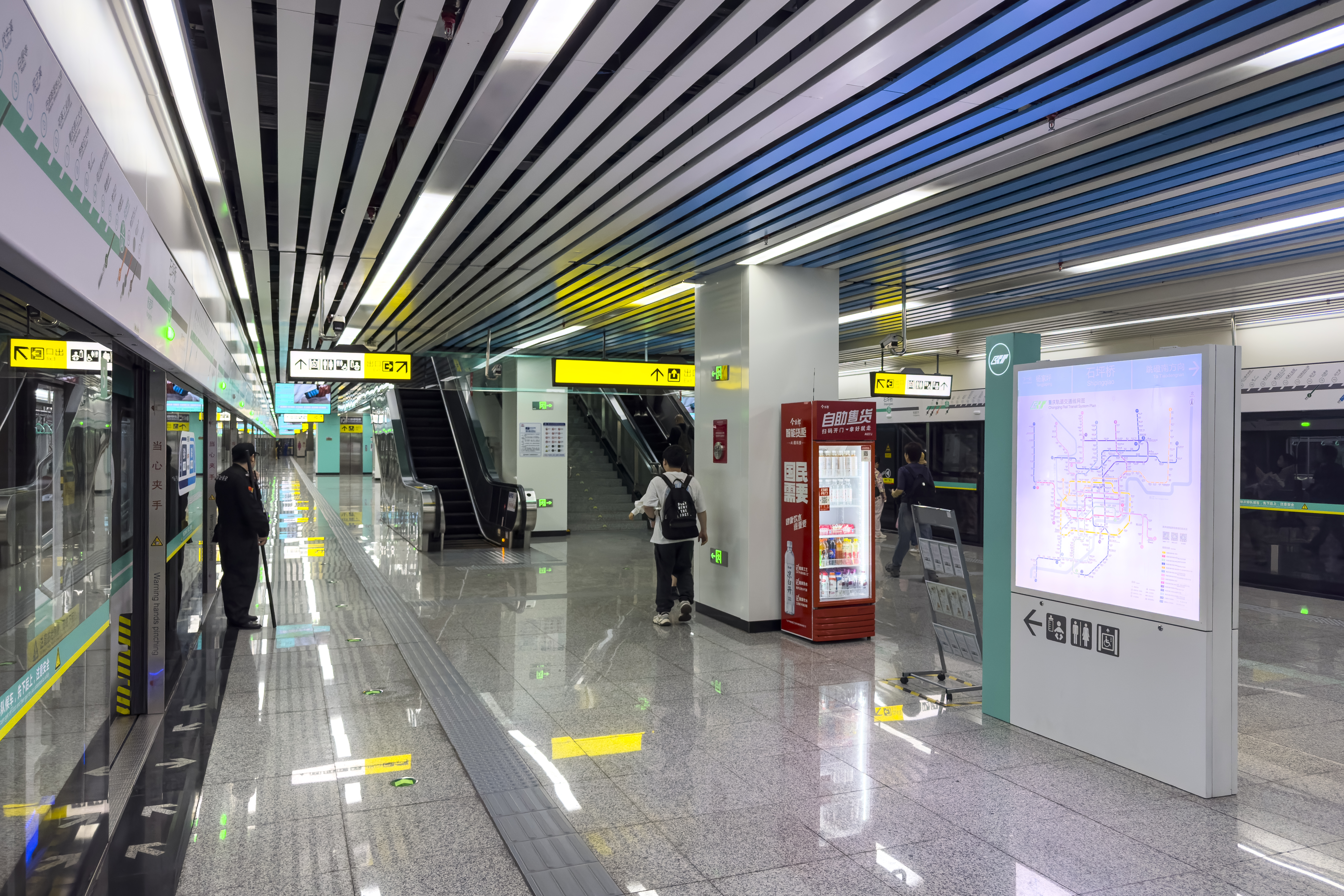
- Platforms

General information
- Location: Shipingqiao Main Street; Jiulongpo, Chongqing; China
- Coordinates: 29°31′05″N 106°30′12″E
- Operator: Chongqing Rail Transit Corp., Ltd
- Line: Line 18
- Platforms: 2 (1 island platform)

Construction
- Structure type: Underground

Other information
- Station code: /

History
- Opened: 28 December 2023; 2 years ago

Services
Preceding station	Chongqing Rail Transit	Following station
Olympic Sports Center towards Fuhualu	Line 18	Yangjiaping towards Tiaodengnan
Location

Shipingqiao is a station on Line 18 of Chongqing Rail Transit in Chongqing Municipality, China. It is located in Jiulongpo District. The station opened to passengers on 28 December 2023.

== Station Structure ==
=== Line 18 Platforms ===
F2; Platforms	Line 18 to Fuhualu (Olympic Sports Center)
F2; Platforms	Island platform
F2; Platforms	Line 18 to Tiaodengnan (Yangjiaping)
