= Line 18 (Chongqing Rail Transit) =

Metro line in Chongqing, China

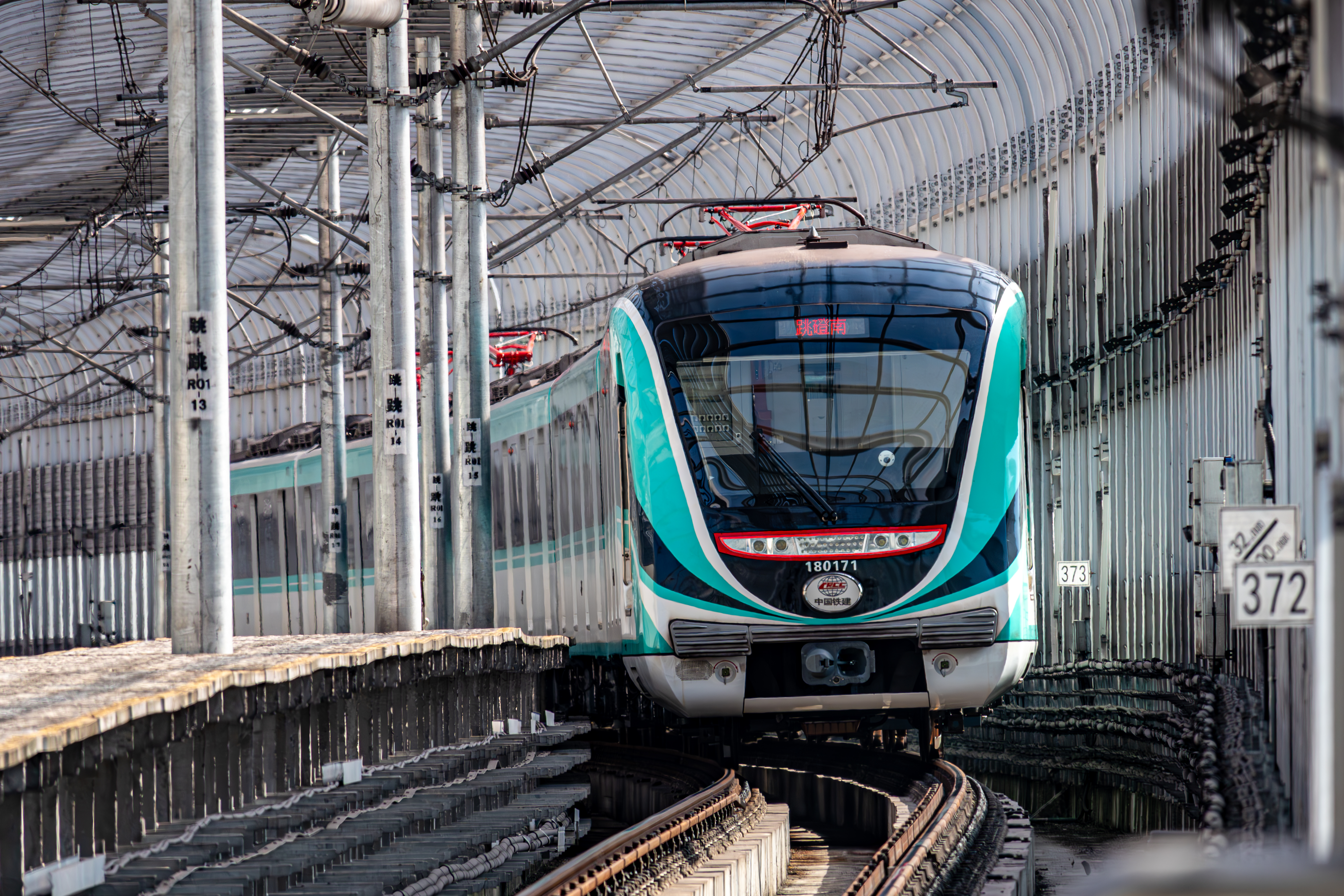
- A train of Line 18 at Tiaodeng station

Overview
- Native name: 重庆轨道交通18号线
- Status: Partially open
- Line number: 18
- Locale: Chongqing, China
- Termini: Xiaoshizi; Tiaodengnan
- Stations: 19 (Phase 1)

Service
- Type: Rapid transit
- System: Chongqing Rail Transit
- Operator(s): Chongqing Rail Transit (Group) Co., Ltd.

History
- Opened: 28 December 2023; 2 years ago

Technical
- Line length: 29.016 km (18.0 mi) (Phase 1)
- Number of tracks: 2
- Track gauge: 1,435 mm (4 ft 8 1/2 in)
- Electrification: 1500 V DC Overhead line

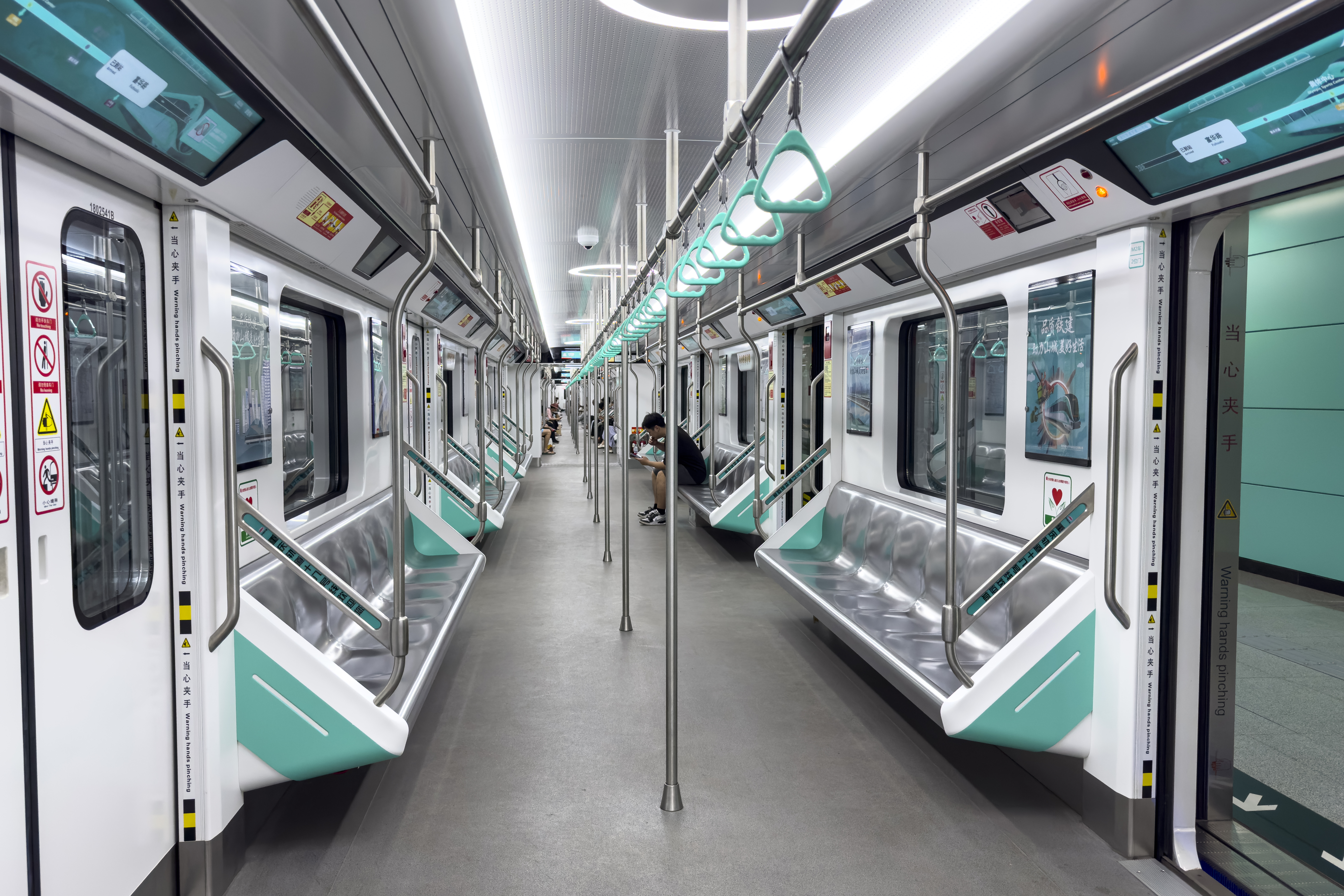
Interior of a Line 18 train

Line 18 (formerly known as Line 5A) of CRT is a metro line in Chongqing, China. It is expected to be fully completed in 2028.

== Stations ==
Route of Line 18

=== Phase I ===
Phase I of Line 18 started construction on 2 March 2021, and opened on 28 December 2023. It is 29.016 km in length.

Station No.	Station name		Connections	Distance km		Location
Station No.	English	Chinese	Connections	Distance km		Location
/	Fuhualu	富华路	Line 9	-	0	Yuzhong
/	Xietaizi	歇台子	Line 1 Line 5	2.053		Jiulongpo
/	Olympic Sports Center	奥体中心	Loop line	1.354		Jiulongpo
/	Shipingqiao	石坪桥		1.317		Jiulongpo
/	Yangjiaping	杨家坪	Line 2	1.270		Jiulongpo
/	Tanzikou	滩子口		1.617		Jiulongpo
/	Huangjueping	黄桷坪	CRW	1.367		Jiulongpo
/	Sichuan Fine Arts Institute	四川美术学院		0.930		Jiulongpo
/	Dianchang	电厂		0.934		Jiulongpo
/	Lijiatuo Daqiao	李家沱大桥		2.020		Ba'nan
/	Chongqing University of Technology	重庆理工大学		1.116		Ba'nan
/	Huaxi Industrial Park	花溪工业园		1.728		Ba'nan
/	Babinlu Wetland Park	巴滨路湿地公园		1.996		Ba'nan
/	Qiezixi	茄子溪	QXW	1.634		Dadukou
/	Baijusi	白居寺	Line 2	1.406		Dadukou
/	Funiuxi	伏牛溪		1.217		Dadukou
/	Jin'aoshan	金鳌山		2.180		Dadukou
/	Tiaodeng	跳磴	Line 5 Jiangtiao line	2.315		Dadukou
/	Tiaodengnan	跳磴南		1.676		Dadukou

=== Phase II ===
- Currently under construction

Station No.	Station name		Connections	Distance km	Location
Station No.	English	Chinese	Connections	Distance km	Location
	Xiaoshizi	小什字	Line 1 Line 6		Yuzhong
	Kaixuanlu	凯旋路			Yuzhong
	Shibati	十八梯			Yuzhong
	Qixinggang	七星岗	Line 1 Line 10		Yuzhong
	Chongqing Station	重庆站	27 CQW		Yuzhong
	Caiyuanlu	菜袁路			Yuzhong
	Huangshaxi	黄沙溪			Yuzhong
	Dapingxi	大坪西			Yuzhong
