= Xiantao (disambiguation) =

Xiantao is a city in Hubei, China.

Xiantao may also refer to:

- Peaches of Immortality in Chinese mythology
- Xiantao Subdistrict, Yubei District, Chongqing, China
