= Caiyunhu station =

Chongqing Rail Transit station in China

Coordinates: 29°31′3″N 106°27′58″E

Caiyunhu 彩云湖
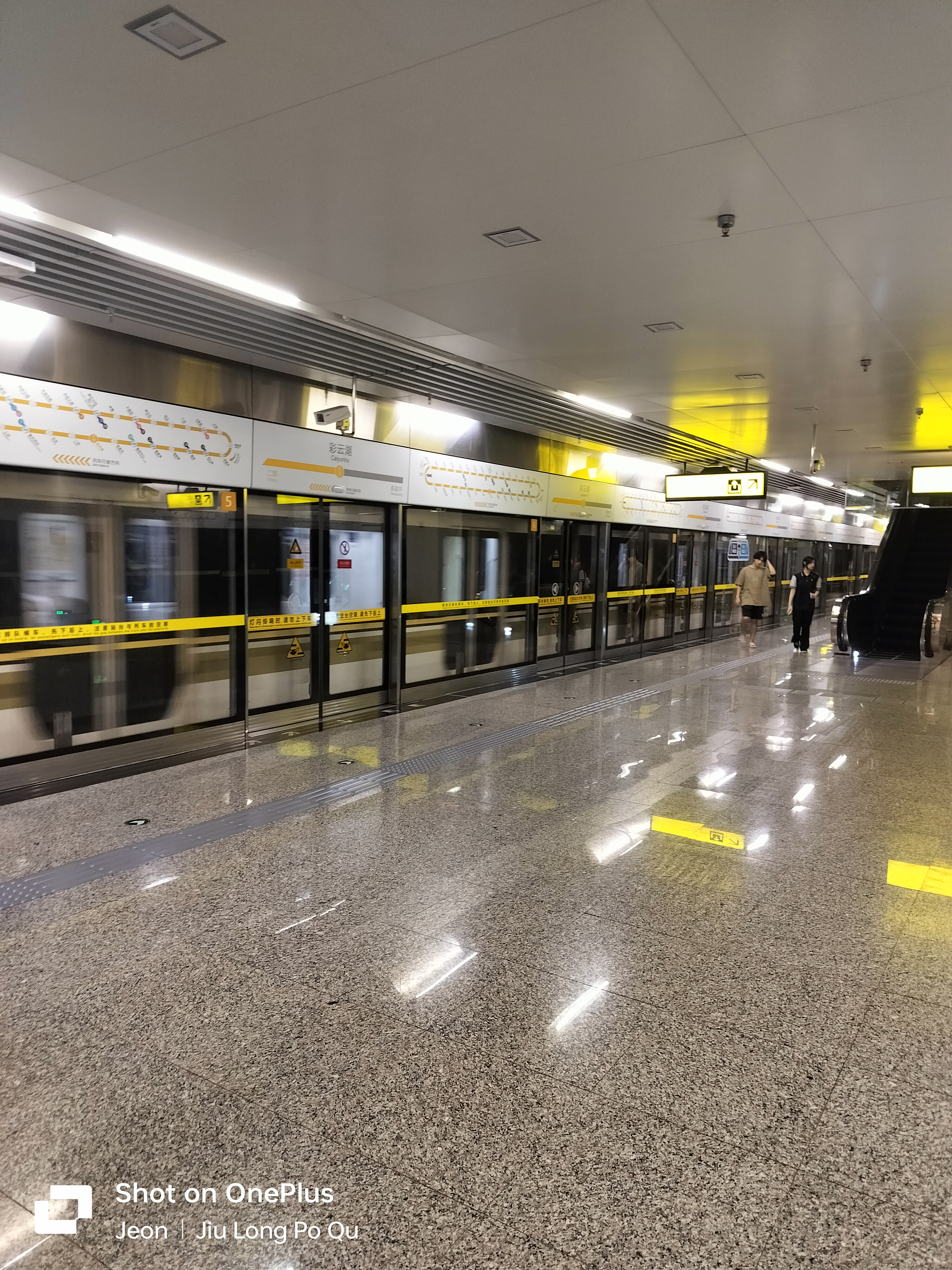
- Caiyunhu station

General information
- Location: Chongqing; China
- Operated by: Chongqing Rail Transit Corp., Ltd
- Line: Loop line
- Platforms: 2 (1 island platform)

Construction
- Structure type: Underground

Other information
- Station code: 环/31

History
- Opened: 30 December 2019; 6 years ago

Services
Preceding station	Chongqing Rail Transit	Following station
Chenjiaping Counter-clockwise	Loop line	Erlang Clockwise
Location

Caiyunhu station (Chinese: 彩云湖站; pinyin: Cǎiyúnhú Zhàn; lit. 'Caiyun Lake station') is a station on Loop line of Chongqing Rail Transit in Chongqing municipality, China. It is located in Jiulongpo District and opened in 2019.
