= Chenjiaping station =

Chongqing Rail Transit station

Coordinates: 29.5262°N 106.4854°E

Chenjiaping 陈家坪
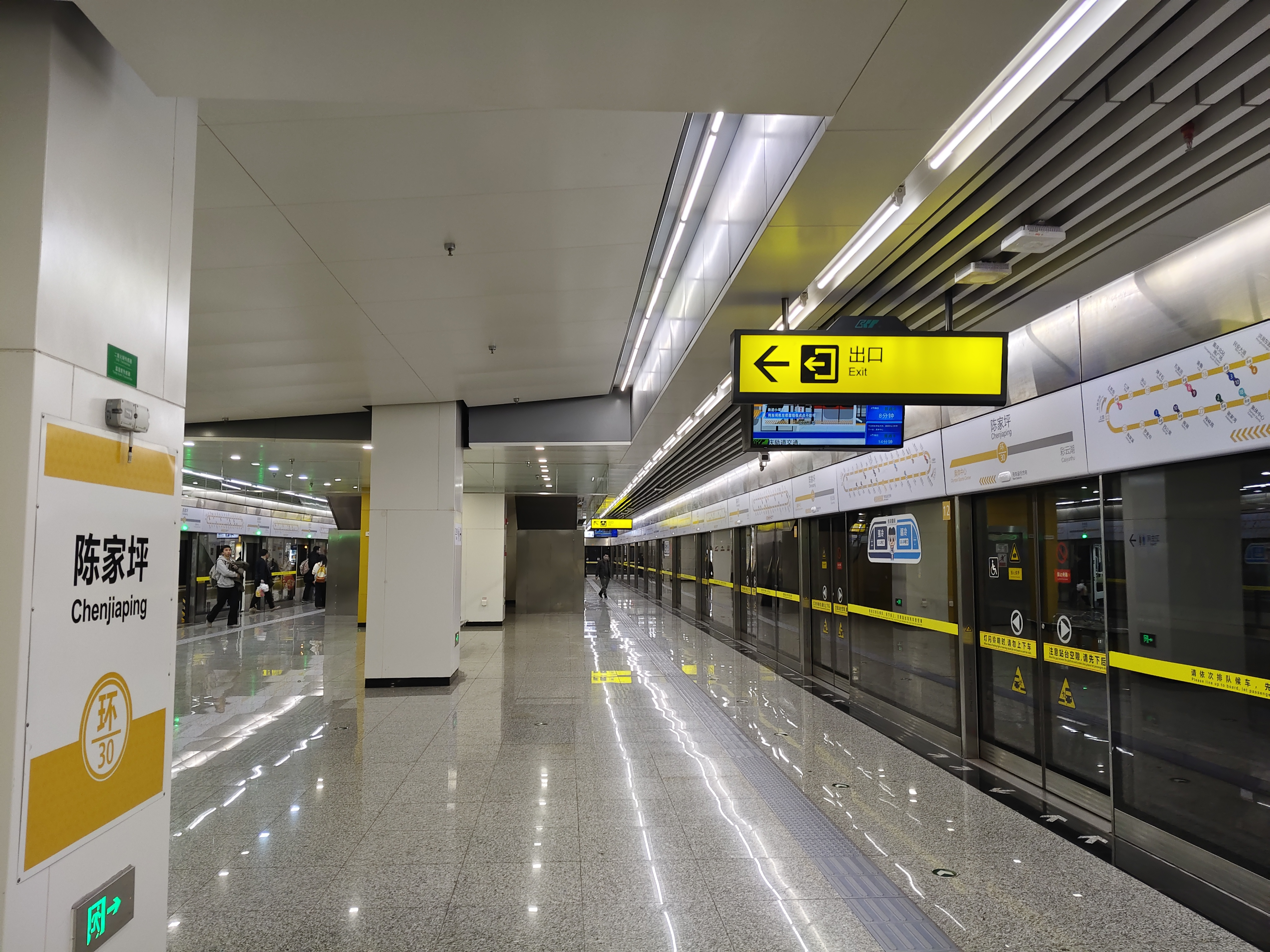

General information
- Location: Chongqing; China
- Operated by: Chongqing Rail Transit Corp., Ltd
- Line: Loop line
- Platforms: 2 (1 island platform)

Construction
- Structure type: Underground

Other information
- Station code: 环/30

History
- Opened: 30 December 2019; 6 years ago

Services
Preceding station	Chongqing Rail Transit	Following station
Olympic Sports Center Counter-clockwise	Loop line	Caiyunhu Clockwise
Location

Chenjiaping Station is a station on Loop line of Chongqing Rail Transit in Chongqing municipality, China. It is located in Jiulongpo District and opened in 2019.
