= Babinlu Wetland Park station =

Metro station in Chongqing, China

Babinlu Wetland Park 巴滨路湿地公园
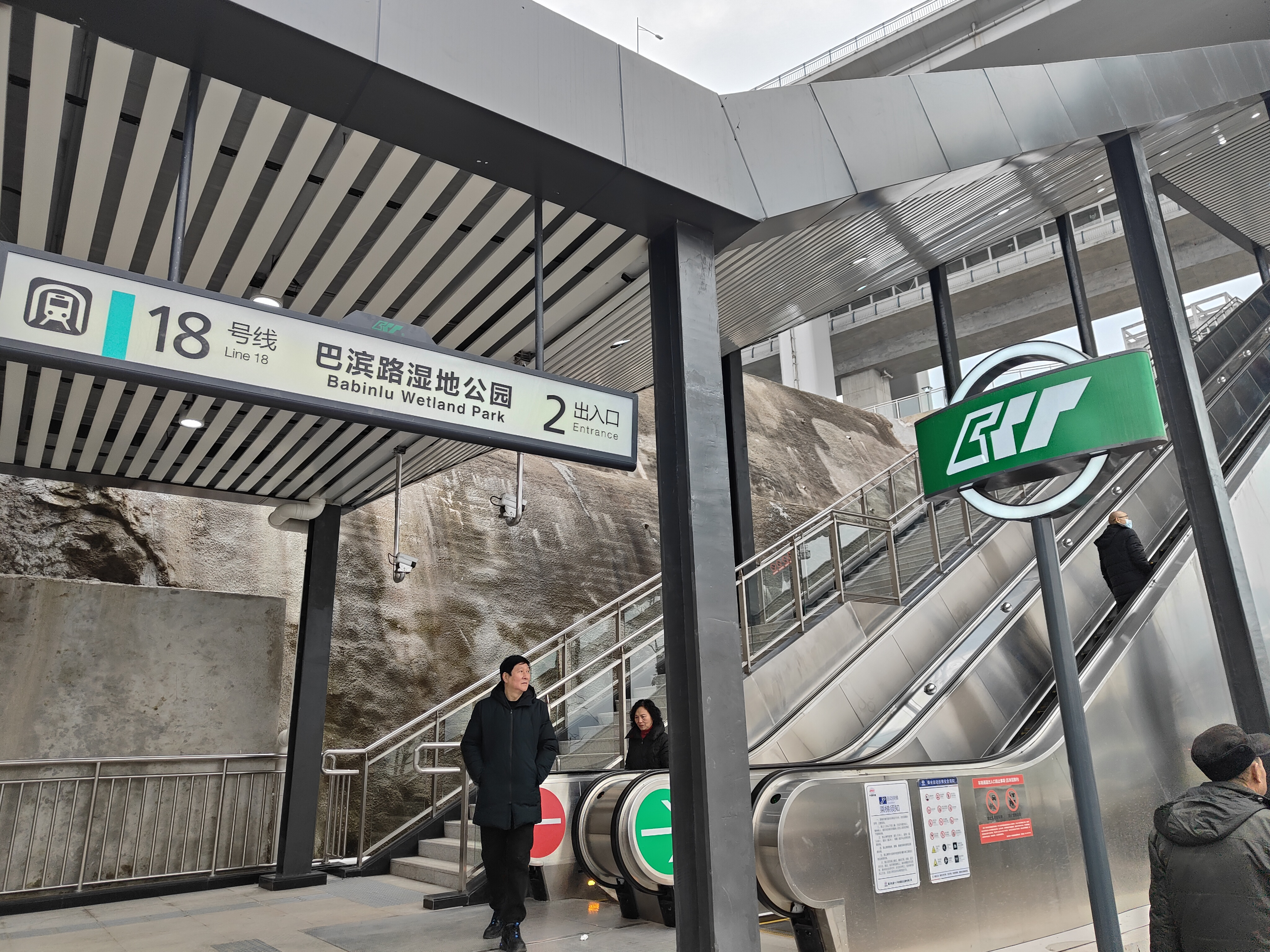
- Entrance 2

General information
- Location: Banan, Chongqing; China
- Coordinates: 29°26′03″N 106°30′43″E
- Operated by: Chongqing Rail Transit Corp., Ltd
- Line: Line 18
- Platforms: 2 (2 side platforms)

Construction
- Structure type: Elevated

Other information
- Station code: 18/13

History
- Opened: 28 December 2023; 2 years ago (Line 18)

Services
Preceding station	Chongqing Rail Transit	Following station
Huaxi Industrial Park towards Fuhualu	Line 18	Qiezixi towards Tiaodengnan
Location

Babinlu Wetland Park is a station on Line 18 of Chongqing Rail Transit in Chongqing Municipality, China. It is located in Banan District. The station opened to passengers in December 2023.

== Station Structure ==
B3; Platforms	Side platform
B3; Platforms	Line 18 to Fuhualu (Huaxi Industrial Park)
B3; Platforms	Line 18 to Tiaodengnan (Qiezixi)
B3; Platforms	Side platform
