= Dayancun station =

Metro station in Chongqing, China

Coordinates: 29°29′59″N 106°29′56″E

Dayancun 大堰村
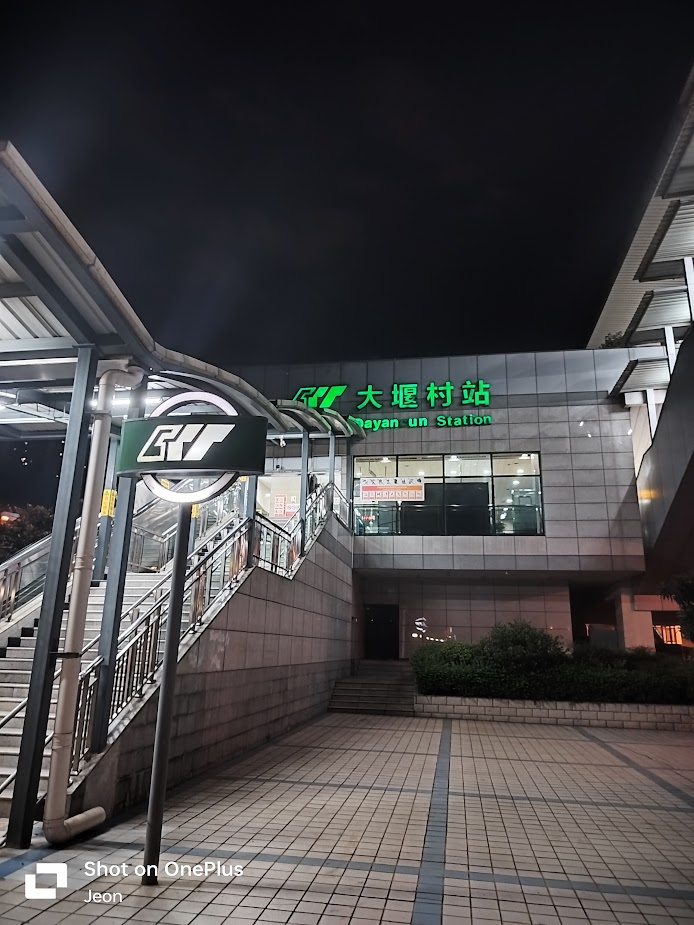

General information
- Location: Chongqing; China
- Operated by: Chongqing Rail Transit Corp., Ltd
- Line: Line 2
- Platforms: 2 side platforms

Construction
- Structure type: Elevated

Other information
- Station code: /

History
- Opened: 1 July 2006; 19 years ago

Services
Preceding station	Chongqing Rail Transit	Following station
Zoo towards Jiaochangkou	Line 2	Mawangchang towards Yudong
Location

Dayancun is a station on Line 2 of Chongqing Rail Transit in Chongqing Municipality, China. It is located in Jiulongpo District. It opened in 2006.

== Station structure ==
3F; Platforms	Side platform
3F; Platforms	Line 2 to Jiaochangkou (Zoo)
3F; Platforms	Line 2 to Yudong (Mawangchang)
3F; Platforms	Side platform
2F; Concourse	Exits, Customer service, Vending machines
