= Qiezixi station =

Metro station in Chongqing, China

Qiezixi 茄子溪
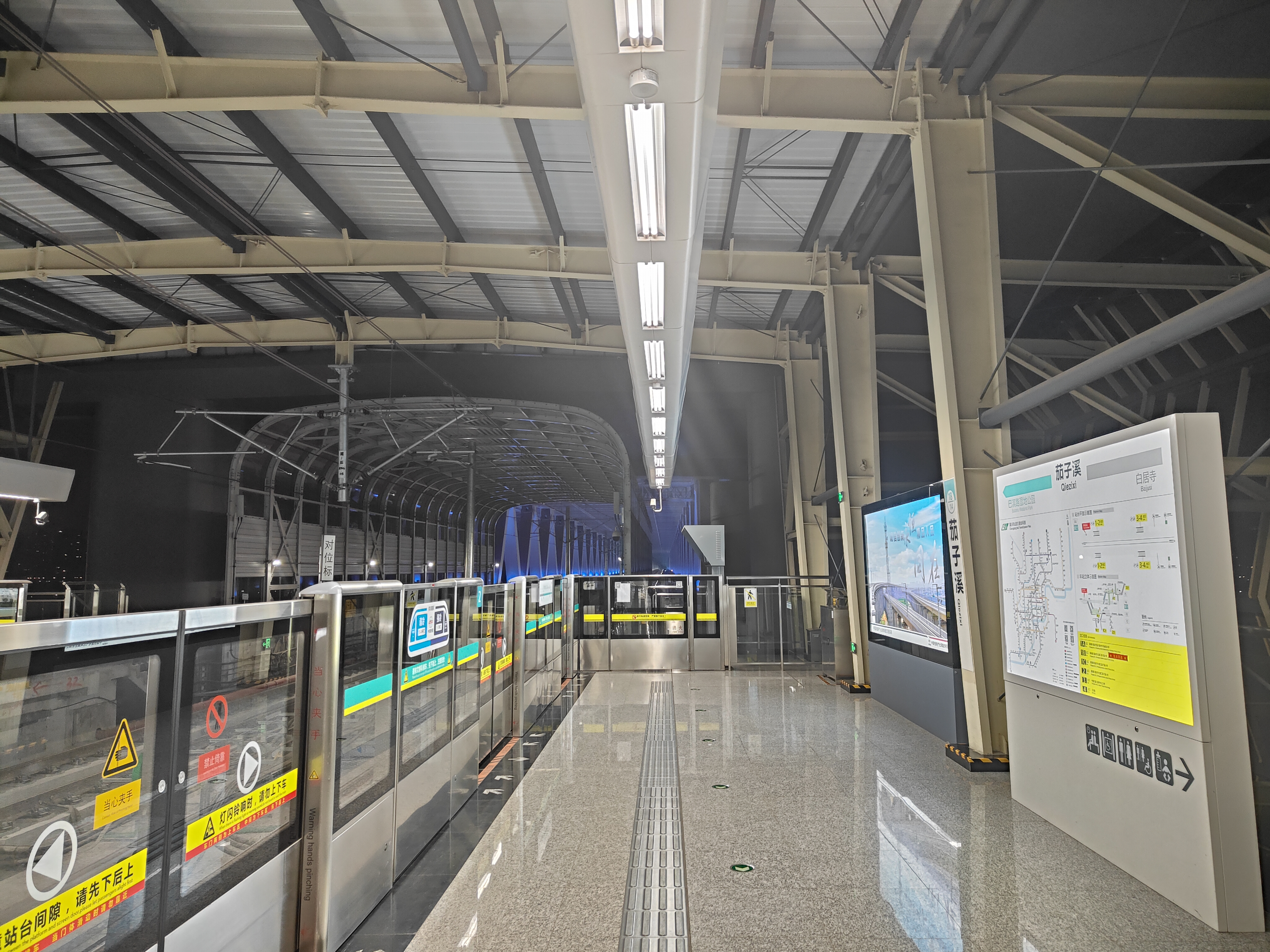

General information
- Location: Dadukou, Chongqing; China
- Coordinates: 29°25′40″N 106°30′09″E
- Operated by: Chongqing Rail Transit Corp., Ltd
- Line: Line 18
- Platforms: 2 (2 side platforms)

Construction
- Structure type: Elevated

Other information
- Station code: /

History
- Opened: 28 December 2023; 2 years ago (Line 18)

Services
Preceding station	Chongqing Rail Transit	Following station
Babinlu Wetland Park towards Fuhualu	Line 18	Baijusi towards Tiaodengnan
Location

Qiezixi is a station on Line 18 of Chongqing Rail Transit in Chongqing Municipality, China. It is located in Dadukou District. The station opened to passengers in December 2023.

== Station Structure ==
B3; Platforms	Side platform
B3; Platforms	Line 18 to Fuhualu (Babinlu Wetland Park)
B3; Platforms	Line 18 to Tiaodengnan (Baijusi)
B3; Platforms	Side platform
