= Jinfeng, Jiulongpo District =

Jinfeng 金凤镇
- Town
- Location in Chongqing
- Coordinates: 29°31′19″N 106°18′35″E
- Country: People's Republic of China
- Direct-administered municipality: Chongqing
- District: Jiulongpo District
- Time zone: UTC+8 (China Standard)

Jinfeng (simplified Chinese: 金凤; traditional Chinese: 金鳳; pinyin: Jīnfèng) is a town under the administration of Jiulongpo District, Chongqing, China. As of 2018, it has 3 residential communities and 7 villages under its administration.

== See also ==
- List of township-level divisions of Chongqing
