= Chongqing Zoo =

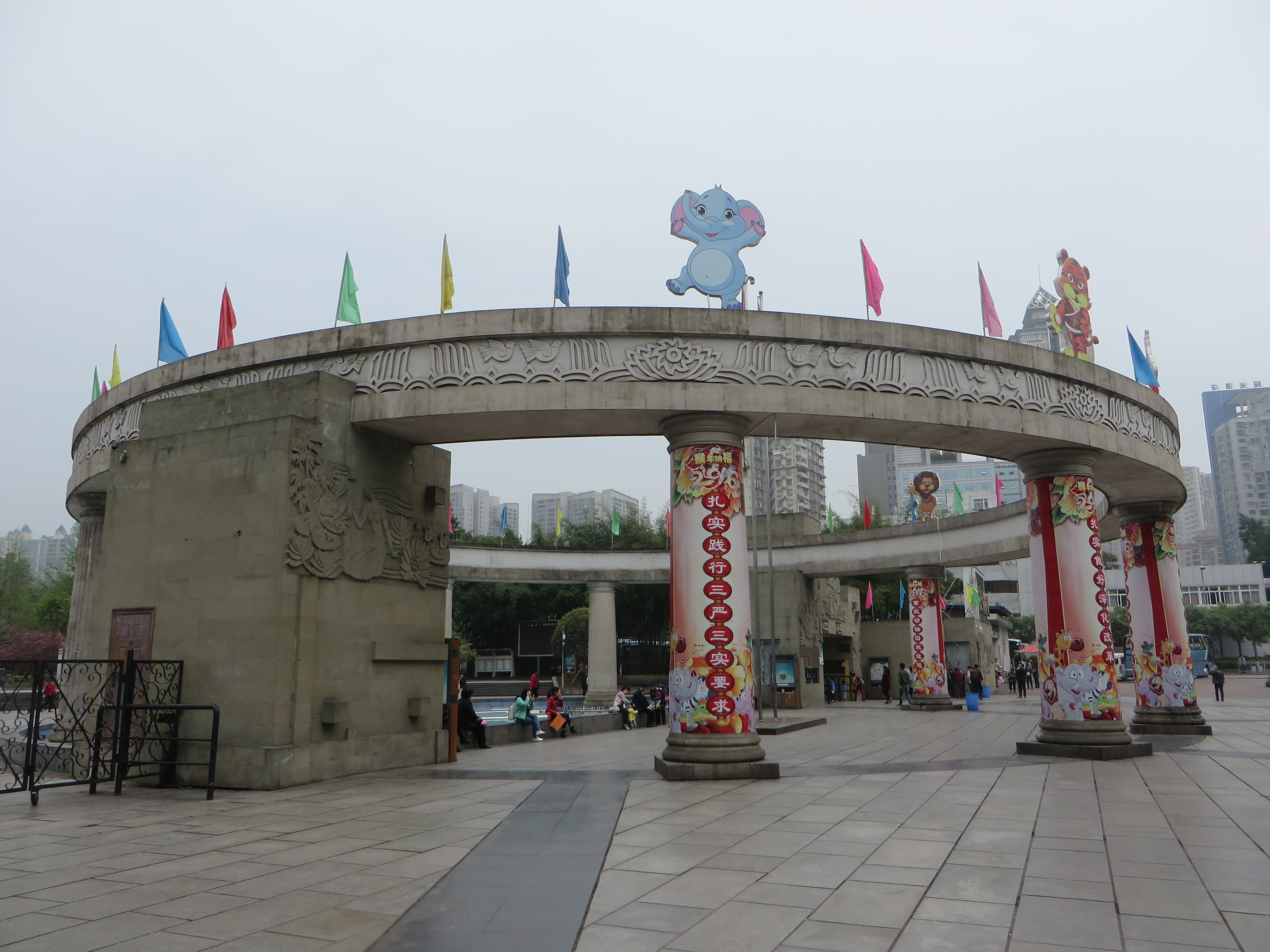
- Main entrance of the zoo
- Interactive map of Chongqing Zoo
- 29.503°N 106.506°E
- Date opened: 1955
- Location: Jiulongpo District, Chongqing, China
- Land area: 45 hectares (111 acres)
- Major exhibits: Panda Enclosure, Dinosaur Valley
- Website: www.cqzoo.com

Chongqing Zoo (Chinese: 重庆动物园; pinyin: Chóngqìng dòngwùyuán) is a zoo in the city of Chongqing, China, about 8 km (5 miles) southwest from the city centre.

== Overview ==
The zoo is located at Yangjiaping on Xijiao Road in the Jiulongpo District of Chongqing. It was built in 1953 and officially opened to the public in 1955. The zoo covers an area of 45 hectares (111 acres).

The zoo is an important base for the protection of and research on wild animals. It exhibits rare species including giant pandas, red pandas, South China tigers, white tigers and African elephants.

The main entrance of the zoo is close to Zoo station on Line 2 of the Chongqing Rail Transit.

The zoo was previously accredited by the World Association of Zoos and Aquariums (WAZA).

== Gallery ==
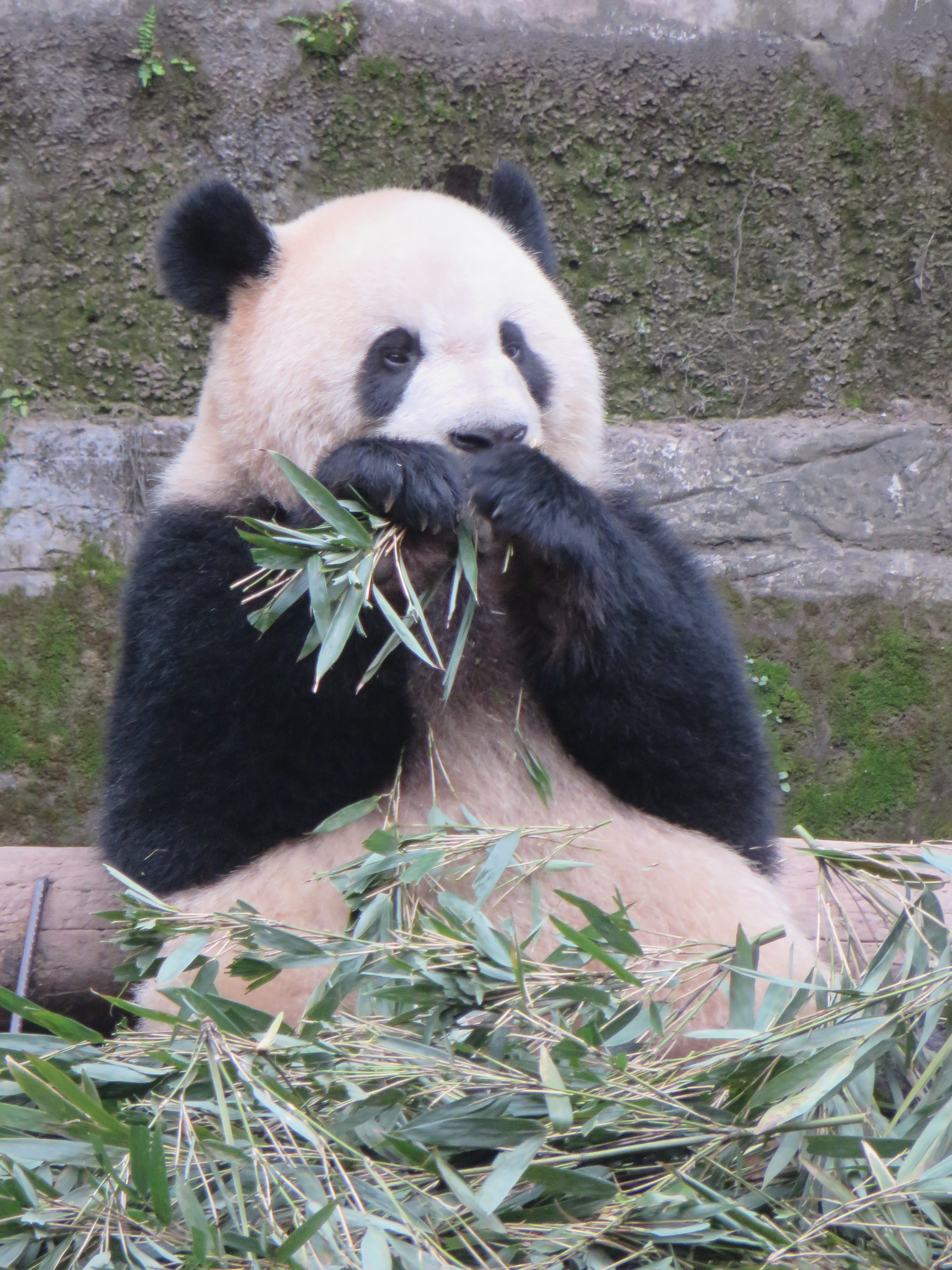
Female giant panda called "Mang Zei" eating bamboo in the Panda Enclosure

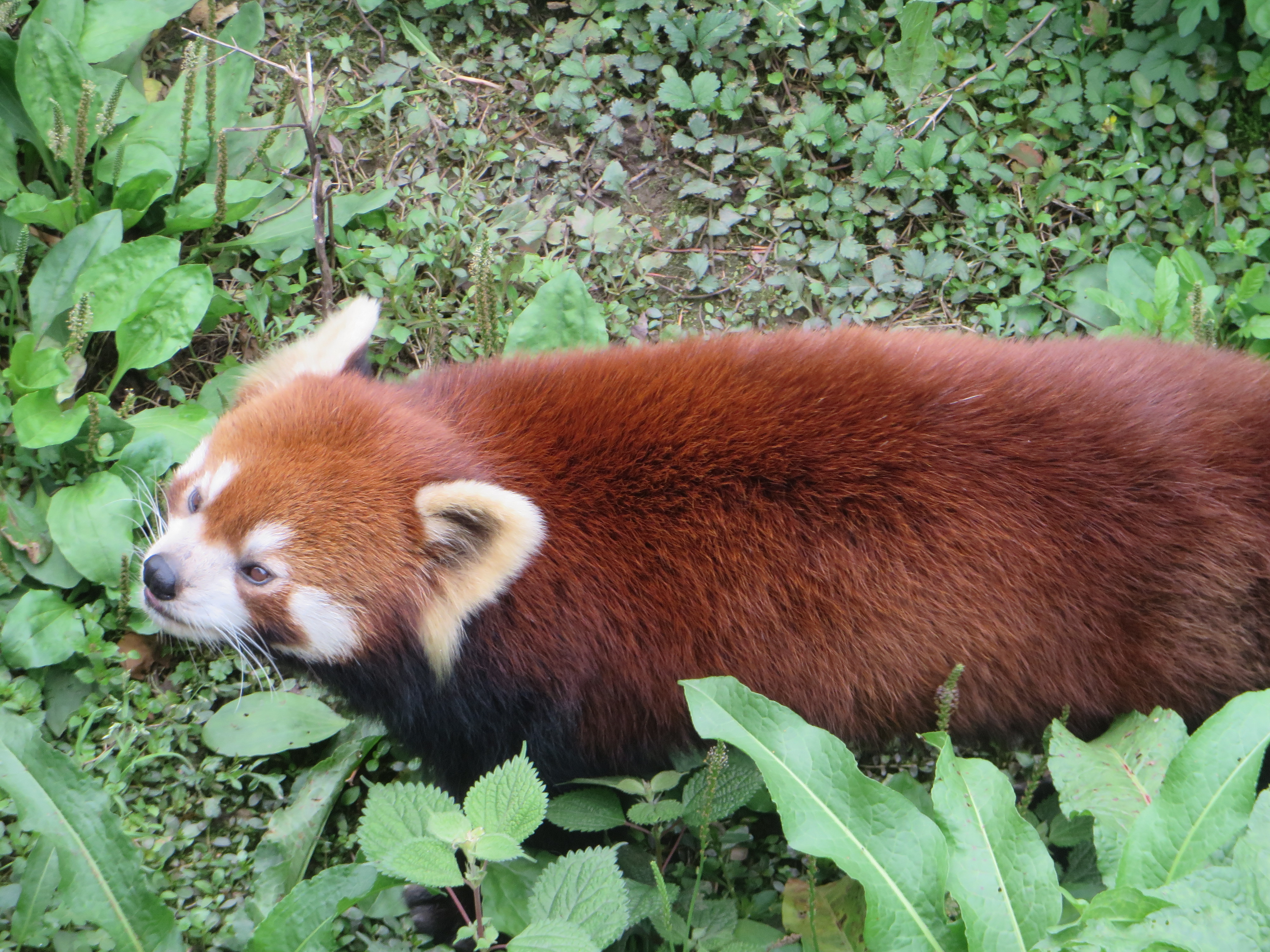
Red panda from above at the zoo

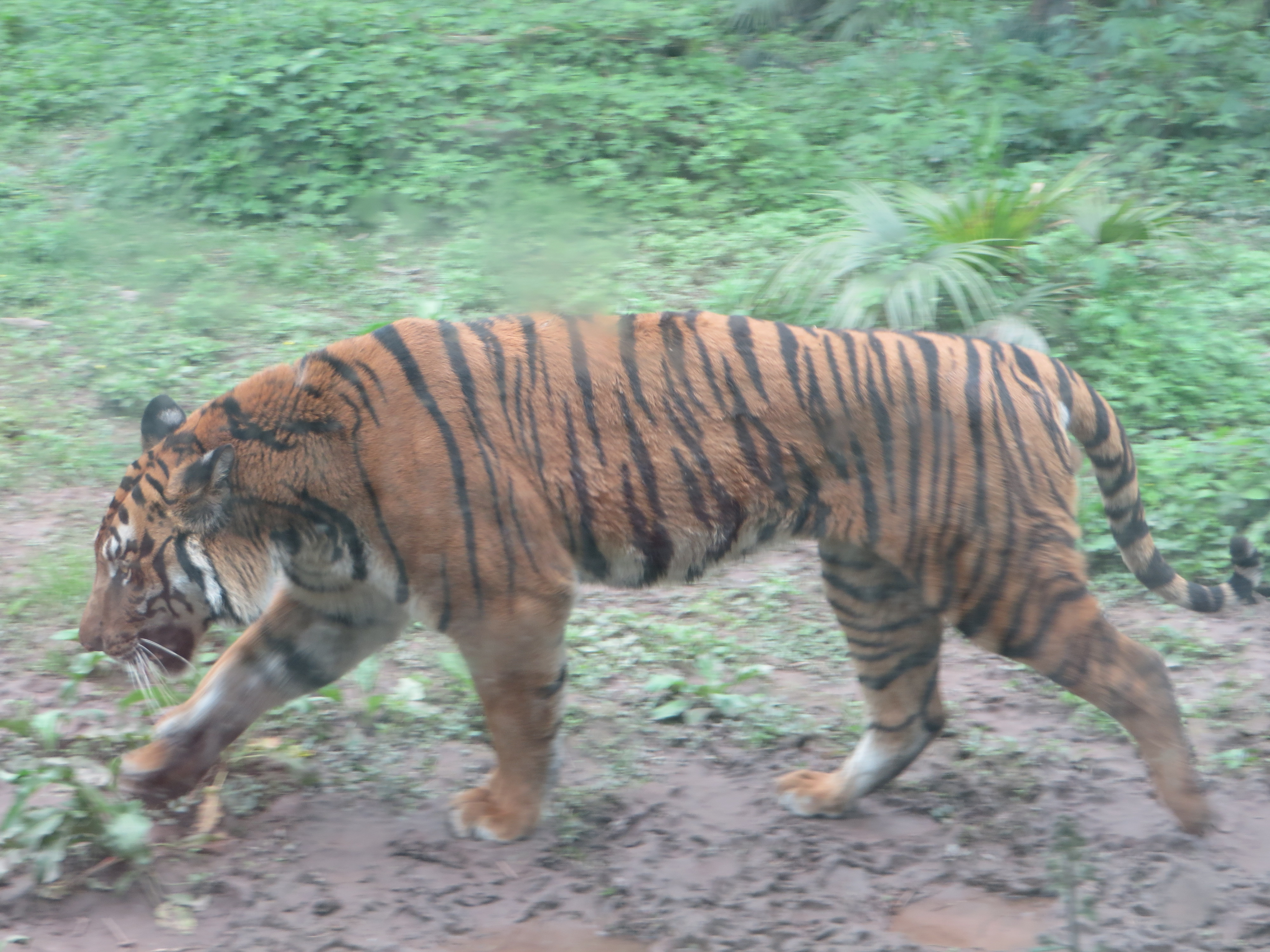
South China tiger pacing at the zoo

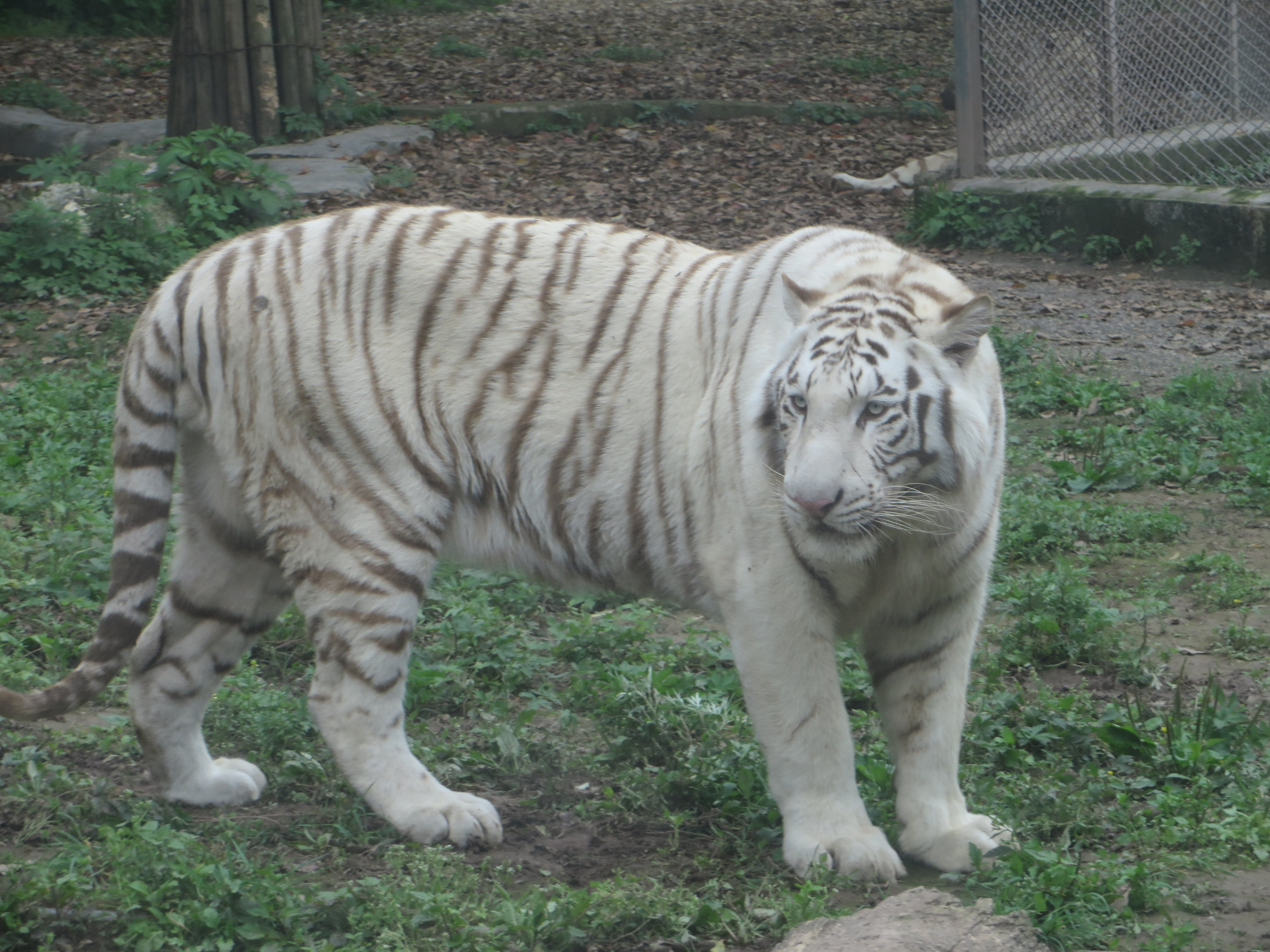
Male white tiger called "Bo Bo" at the zoo

== See also ==
- Zoo station
- List of zoos
