= Xiejiawan station =

Station in Chongqing Municipality, China

Coordinates: 29°31′09″N 106°31′03″E

Xiejiawan 谢家湾
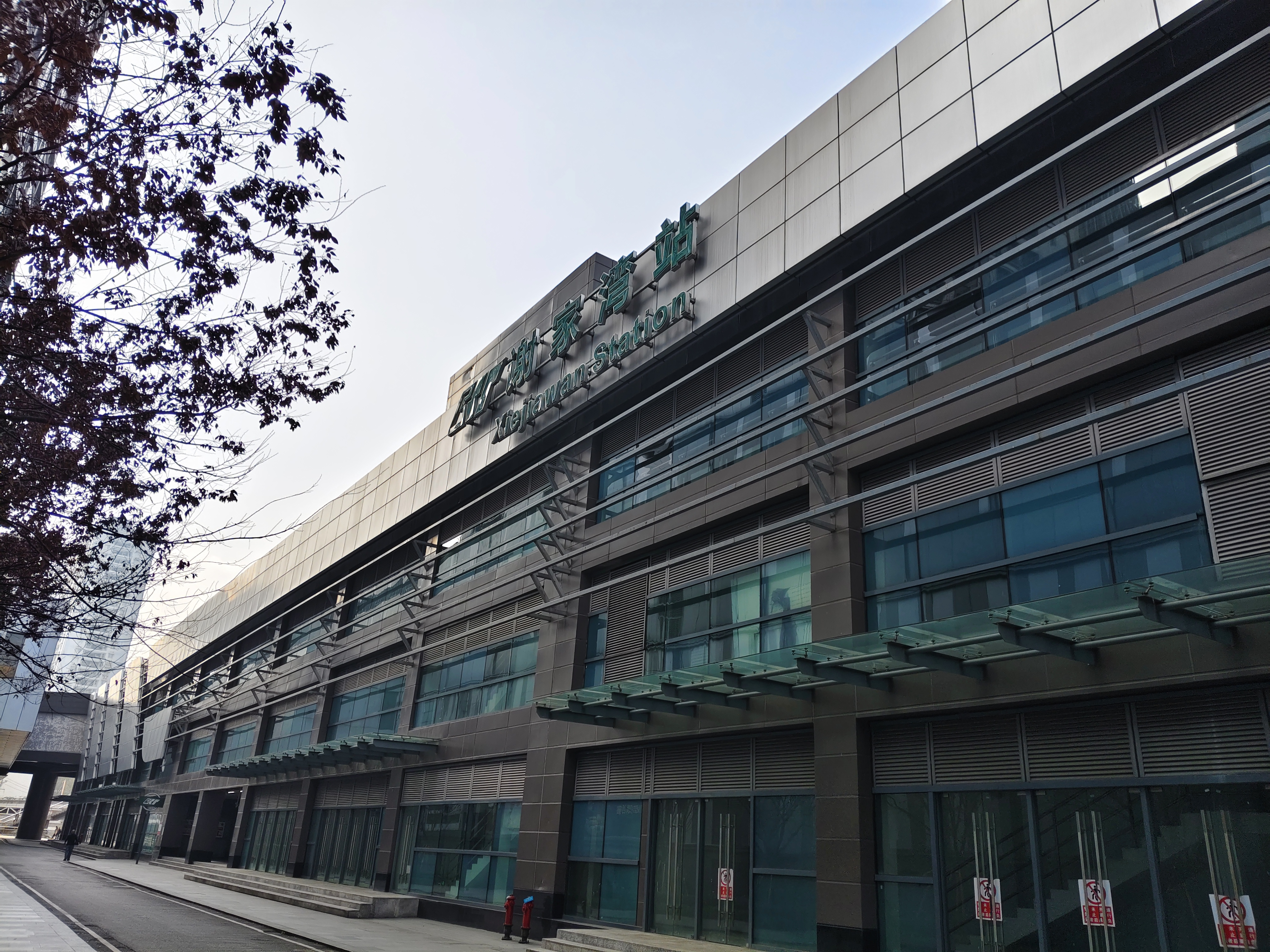
- Outside view of station hall of Loop line

General information
- Location: Chongqing; China
- Operated by: Chongqing Rail Transit Corp., Ltd
- Lines: Line 2 Loop line
- Platforms: 4 (2 side platforms and 1 island platform)

Construction
- Structure type: Elevated (Line 2); At-grade and underground (Loop line)

Other information
- Station code: / /

History
- Opened: 10 July 2006; 20 years ago (Line 2); 30 December 2019; 6 years ago (Loop line)

Services
Preceding station	Chongqing Rail Transit	Following station
Yuanjiagang towards Jiaochangkou	Line 2	Yangjiaping towards Yudong
Haixialu Counter-clockwise	Loop line	Olympic Sports Center Clockwise
Location

Xiejiawan is a station on Line 2 of Chongqing Rail Transit in Chongqing Municipality, China. It is located in the Jiulongpo District. The station began service in 2006. In 2019, the station turned into an interchange station with the opening of the southwestern extension of Loop Line. Nevertheless, due to the transfer passage is still under construction, all passengers transferring between the two lines must exit the station first.

== Station structure ==
=== Line 2 ===
3F; Platforms	Side platform
3F; Platforms	Line 2 to Jiaochangkou (Yuanjiagang)
3F; Platforms	Line 2 to Yudong (Yangjiaping)
3F; Platforms	Side platform
Mezzanine; Toilets, equipment area	Toilets are only located on the mezzanine between the northern part of the concourse and the platform towards Jiaochangkou
2F; Concourse	Exits 5–6, Customer service, Vending machines, Transfer passage to Loop line (U/C)

=== Loop line ===
2F	Transfer passage to Line 2 (U/C)
1F; Concourse	Exits 1–4, Customer service, Vending machines
B1; Platforms	Loop line counterclockwise loop (Haixialu)
B1; Platforms	Island platform
B1; Platforms	Loop line clockwise loop (Olympic Sports Center)
