= Shiqiaopu station =

Metro station in Chongqing, China

Shiqiaopu 石桥铺
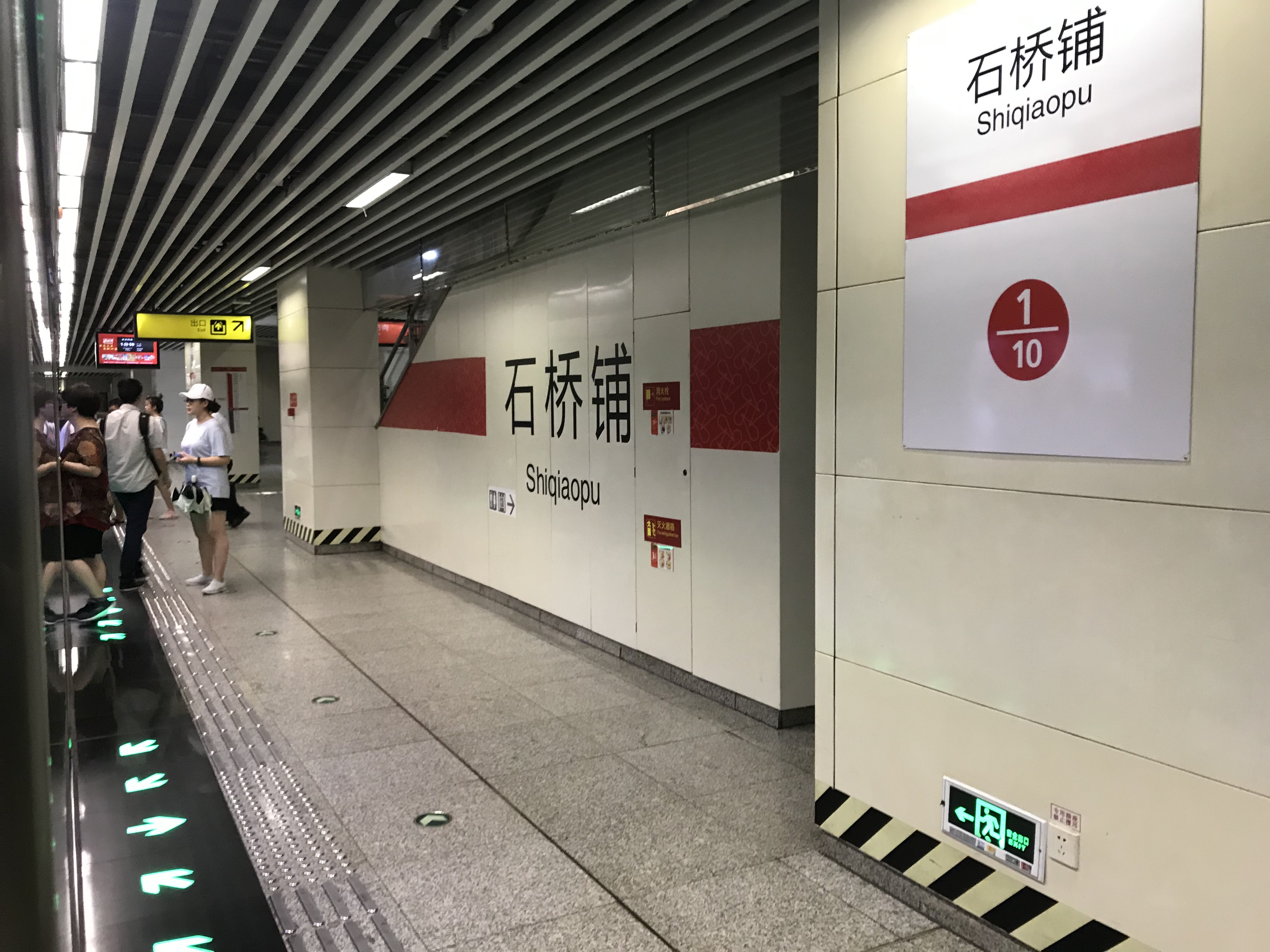
- Platform of Line 1

General information
- Location: Chongqing; China
- Operated by: Chongqing Rail Transit Corp., Ltd
- Lines: Line 1 Line 5
- Platforms: 4 (2 island platforms)

Construction
- Structure type: Underground

Other information
- Station code: / /

History
- Opened: 28 July 2011; 14 years ago (Line 1); 20 January 2021; 5 years ago (Line 5)

Services
Preceding station	Chongqing Rail Transit	Following station
Xietaizi towards Chaotianmen	Line 1	Gaomiaocun towards Bishan
Xietaizi towards Yuegangbeilu	Line 5	Shixinlu towards Tiaodeng
Location

Shiqiaopu is a station in Chongqing Municipality, China. This station began service in 2011 with the opening of Line 1 and turned into an interchange station in 2021 with the opening of Line 5 Southern section. Currently, due to the Central section of Line 5 is still under construction, all local trains of Line 5 Southern section terminate here. It is located in Jiulongpo District.

== Station structure ==
B1; Concourse	Exits, Customer service, Vending machines
B2; Platforms	Line 1 to Bishan (Gaomiaocun)
B2; Platforms	Island platform
B2; Platforms	Line 1 to Chaotianmen (Xietaizi)
B2; Platforms	Line 5 to Tiaodeng (Shixinlu)
B2; Platforms	Island platform
B2; Platforms	Line 5 to Yuegangbeilu (Xietaizi)
