= Mawangchang station =

Metro station in Chongqing, China

Coordinates: 29°29′46″N 106°29′20″E

Mawangchang 马王场
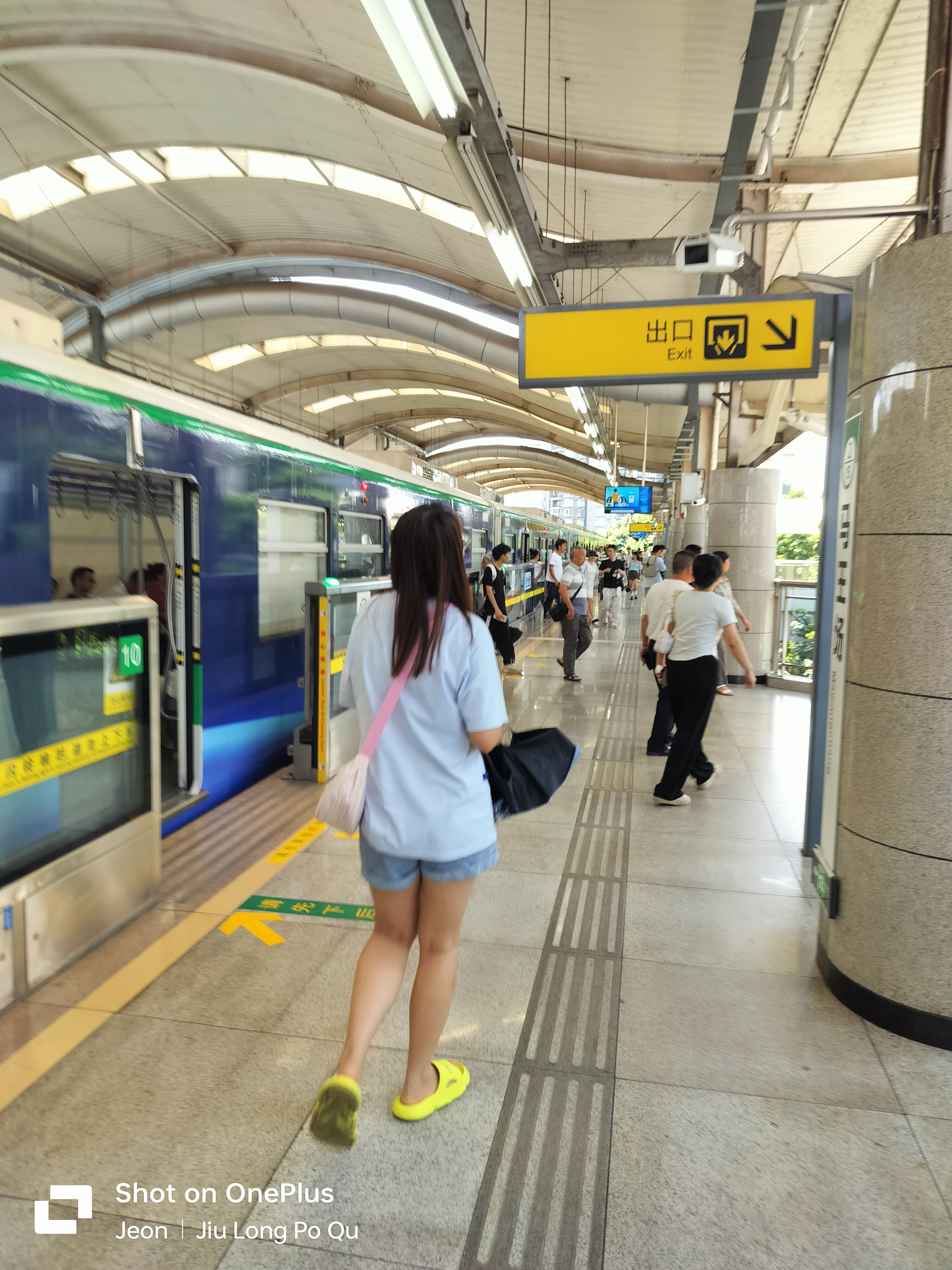

General information
- Location: Chongqing; China
- Operated by: Chongqing Rail Transit Corp., Ltd
- Line: Line 2
- Platforms: 2 side platforms

Construction
- Structure type: Elevated

Other information
- Station code: /

History
- Opened: 1 July 2006; 19 years ago

Services
| Preceding station | Chongqing Rail Transit | Following station |
|---|---|---|
| Dayancun towards Jiaochangkou | Line 2 | Ping'an towards Yudong |
Location

Mawangchang is a station on Line 2 of Chongqing Rail Transit in Chongqing Municipality, China. It is located in Jiulongpo District. It opened in 2006.

== Station structure ==
| 3F; Platforms | Side platform |
| 3F; Platforms | Line 2 to Jiaochangkou (Dayancun) |
| 3F; Platforms | Line 2 to Yudong (Ping'an) |
| 3F; Platforms | Side platform |
| 2F; Concourse | Customer service, Vending machines |
| 1F; Concourse | Exits, Toilets (near exits 3-4 only) |
