= Yangjiaping station =

Metro station in Chongqing, China

Yangjiaping 杨家坪
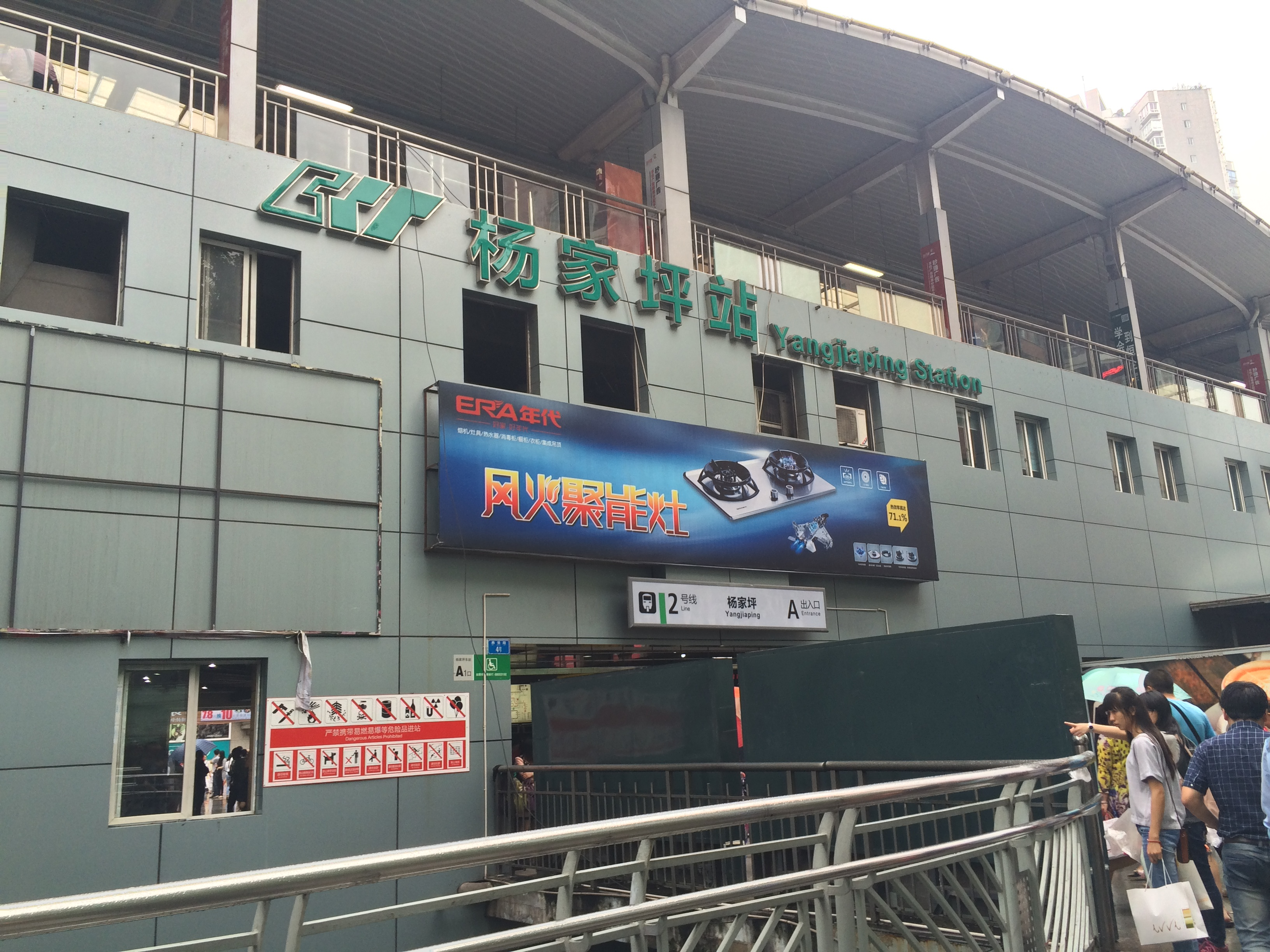

General information
- Location: Chongqing; China
- Coordinates: 29°30′38″N 106°30′36″E (Line 2); 29°30′33″N 106°30′47″E (Line 18)
- Operated by: Chongqing Rail Transit Corp., Ltd
- Lines: Line 2 Line 18
- Platforms: 4 (2 side platforms, 1 island platform)

Construction
- Structure type: Elevated (Line 2); Underground (Line 18)

Other information
- Station code: / /

History
- Opened: 18 June 2005; 20 years ago (Line 2); 28 December 2023; 2 years ago (Line 18)

Services
Preceding station	Chongqing Rail Transit	Following station
Xiejiawan towards Jiaochangkou	Line 2	Zoo towards Yudong
Shipingqiao towards Fuhualu	Line 18	Tanzikou towards Tiaodengnan
Location

Yangjiaping is a station on Line 2 and Line 18 of Chongqing Rail Transit in Chongqing Municipality, China. It is located in Jiulongpo District and opened in 2005.
Although currently there is no available transfer channel between Line 2 - Line 18, due to JD Yangjiaping Mall, however, in the near future (2026/2027), Yangjiaping Station will seek an accessible transfer channel between Line 2-Line 18.

== Station structure ==
3F; Platforms	Side platform
3F; Platforms	Line 2 to Jiaochangkou (Xiejiawan)
3F; Platforms	Line 2 to Yudong (Zoo)
3F; Platforms	Side platform
Mezzanine; Toilets, equipment area	Toilets are only located on the mezzanine between the northern part of the concourse and the platform towards Jiaochangkou
2F; Concourse	Exits, Customer service, Vending machines

=== Line 18 Platforms ===
F2; Platforms	Line 18 to Fuhualu (Shipingqiao)
F2; Platforms	Island platform
F2; Platforms	Line 18 to Tiaodengnan (Tanzikou)
