= Zoo station (Chongqing Rail Transit) =

Metro station in Chongqing, China

Zoo 动物园
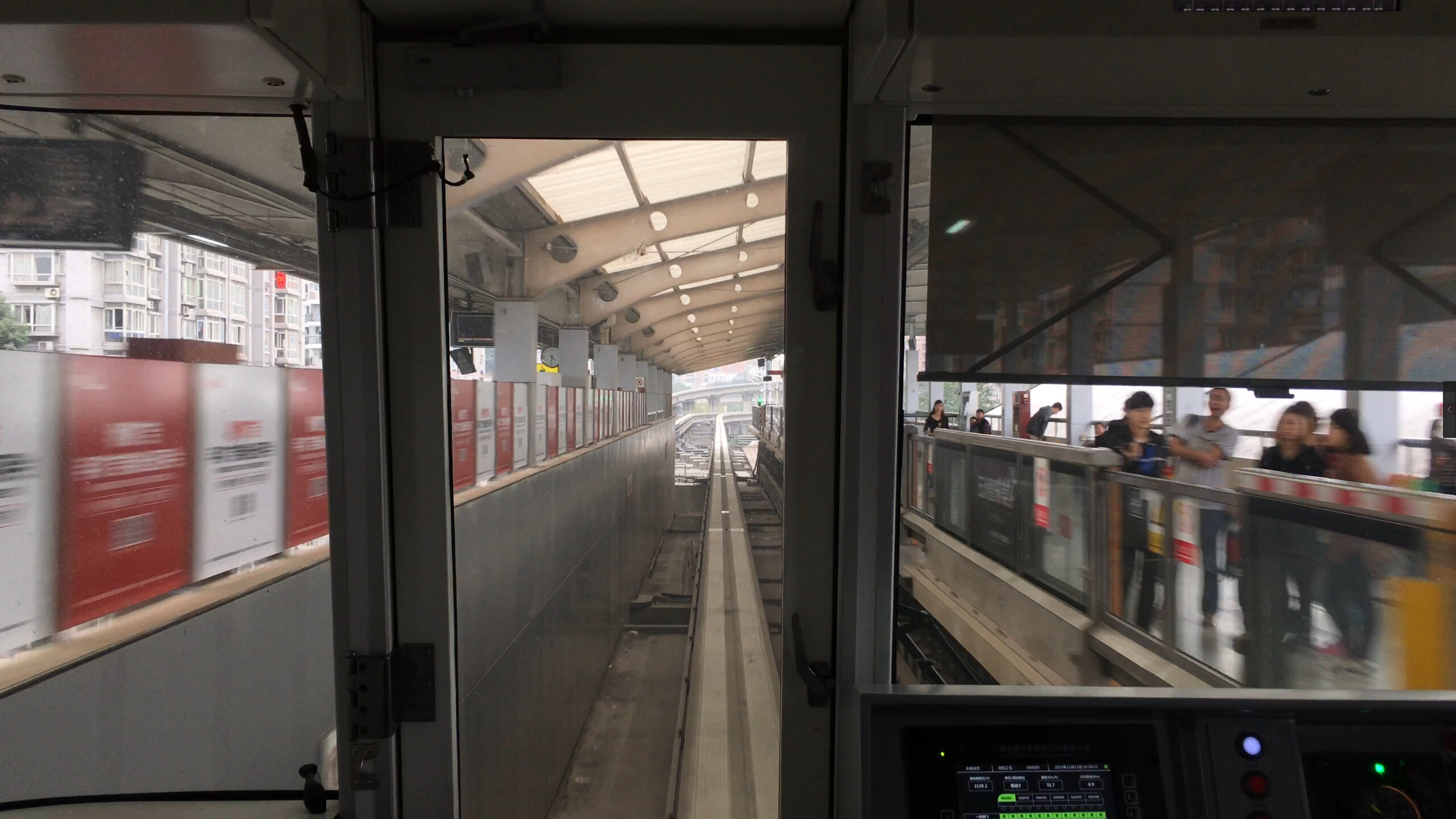

General information
- Location: Chongqing; China
- Coordinates: 29°29′57″N 106°30′28″E
- Operated by: Chongqing Rail Transit Corp., Ltd
- Line: Line 2
- Platforms: 2 side platforms

Construction
- Structure type: Elevated

Other information
- Station code: /

History
- Opened: 18 June 2005; 20 years ago

Services
Preceding station	Chongqing Rail Transit	Following station
Yangjiaping towards Jiaochangkou	Line 2	Dayancun towards Yudong
Location

Zoo is a station on Line 2 of Chongqing Rail Transit in Chongqing Municipality, China.

The station is located in Jiulongpo District. It opened in 2005.

== Station structure ==
3F; Platforms	Line 2 to Jiaochangkou (Yangjiaping)
3F; Platforms	Side platform, doors open on the left (trains to Jiaochangkou only)
3F; Platforms	Line 2 to Yudong (Dayancun)
3F; Platforms	Side platform, doors open on the right
2F; Concourse	Exits, Customer service, Vending machines

== See also ==
- Chongqing Zoo
