= Erlang Subdistrict =

Erlang Subdistrict 二郎街道
- Subdistrict
- Location in Chongqing
- Coordinates: 29°30′37″N 106°27′22″E
- Country: People's Republic of China
- Direct-administered municipality: Chongqing
- District: Jiulongpo District
- Time zone: UTC+8 (China Standard)

Erlang Subdistrict (Chinese: 二郎街道; pinyin: Èrláng Jiēdào) is a subdistrict in Jiulongpo District, Chongqing, China. As of 2023, it administers the following nine residential communities:

- Erlang Community
- Shiyanglu Second Community (石杨路第二社区)
- Shiyanglu Third Community (石杨路第三社区)
- Tongtianyuan Community (同天苑社区)
- Yingbinlu Community (迎宾路社区)
- Wutaishan Community (五台山社区)
- Yunzelu Community (云泽路社区)
- Kechenglu Community (科城路社区)
- Fenghuanglu Community (凤凰路社区)

== See also ==
- List of township-level divisions of Chongqing
