= Erlang, Sichuan =

Erlang 二郎镇
- Town
- Location in Sichuan
- Coordinates: 28°8′57″N 106°10′12″E
- Country: People's Republic of China
- Province: Sichuan
- Prefecture-level City: Luzhou
- County: Gulin County
- Time zone: UTC+8 (China Standard)

Erlang (Chinese: 二郎; pinyin: Èrláng) is a town under the administration of Gulin County, Sichuan, China. As of 2023, it administers the following four residential communities and sixteen villages:

- Erlangtan Community (二郎滩社区)
- Futaojie Community (复陶街社区)
- Huangjin Community (黄金社区)
- Tuchengjie Community (土城街社区)
- Yulin Village (玉林村)
- Lushan Village (卢山村)
- Huanian Village (华年村)
- Leijiagou Village (雷家沟村)
- Qingshui Village (清水村)
- Shiliu Village (石榴村)
- Wenming Village (文明村)
- Meijiuhe Village (美酒河村)
- Shisun Village (石笋村)
- Tieqiao Village (铁桥村)
- Shuiquan Village (水泉村)
- Yutang Village (鱼塘村)
- Fengguang Village (风光村)
- Tucheng Village (土城村)
- Yuhua Village (裕华村)
- Tianjing Village (天井村)

== See also ==
- List of township-level divisions of Sichuan
