= Erlang Township =

Erlang Township 二郎乡
- Township
- Location in Gansu
- Coordinates: 33°50′15″N 105°35′43″E
- Country: People's Republic of China
- Province: Gansu
- Prefecture-level city: Longnan
- County: Cheng County
- Village-level divisions: 10 villages
- Time zone: UTC+8 (China Standard)

Erlang Township (simplified Chinese: 二郎乡; traditional Chinese: 二郎鄉; pinyin: Èrláng Xiāng) is a township of Cheng County, Gansu province, China. As of 2023, it administers the following ten villages:

- Tanhe Village (谭河村)
- Zhuangzi Village (庄子村)
- Dianzi Village (店子村)
- Wuba Village (武坝村)
- Zhaoba Village (赵坝村)
- Yabei Village (崖背村)
- Yanhe Village (严河村)
- Liuping Village (刘坪村)
- Anzi Village (安子村)
- Caoyin Village (曹阴村)

== See also ==
- List of township-level divisions of Gansu
