= Xiantao Subdistrict =

Xiantao Subdistrict 仙桃街道
- Subdistrict
- Location in Chongqing
- Coordinates: 29°42′24″N 106°37′7″E
- Country: People's Republic of China
- Direct-Administered Municipality: Chongqing
- District: Yubei District
- Time zone: UTC+8 (China Standard)

Xiantao Subdistrict (Chinese: 仙桃街道; pinyin: Xiāntáo Jiēdào) is a subdistrict in Liangjiang New Area, Chongqing, China. As of 2020, it has 16 residential communities under its administration:

- Jinyu Road Community (金玉路社区)
- Baiguo Road Community (百果路社区)
- Guifu Road Community (桂馥路社区)
- Muxianhu Community (沐仙湖社区)
- Zhouji Road Community (舟济路社区)
- Tongsheng Road Community (同盛路社区)
- Xianghe Road Community (祥和路社区)
- Muling Road Community (睦邻路社区)
- Lanxin Community (兰馨社区)
- Huashi Community (花石社区)
- Huangshan Community (黄山社区)
- Konggangjiayuan Community (空港佳园社区)
- Shujugu Community (数据谷社区)
- Heqing Road Community (和庆路社区)
- Chunhua Community (春华社区)
- Qiucheng Community (秋成社区)

== See also ==
- List of township-level divisions of Chongqing
