= Erlang, Henan =

Erlang 二郎镇
- Town
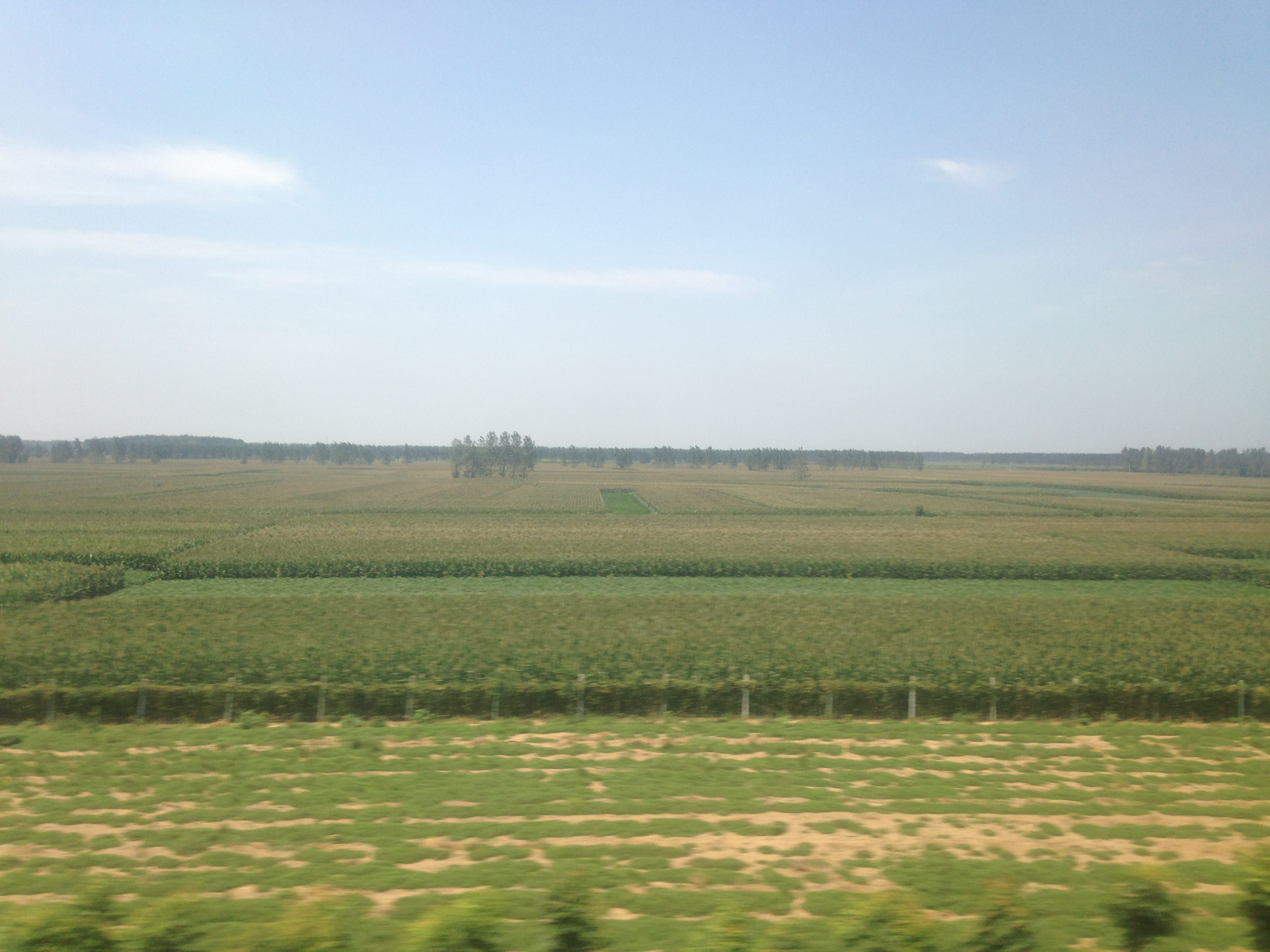
- View near Erlang

- Location in Henan
- Coordinates: 33°18′18″N 114°0′13″E
- Country: People's Republic of China
- Province: Henan
- Prefecture-level City: Zhumadian
- County: Xiping County
- Time zone: UTC+8 (China Standard)

Erlang (Chinese: 二郎; pinyin: Èrláng) is a town under the administration of Xiping County, Henan, China. As of 2023, it administers the following thirteen villages:

- Erlang Village
- Jiaodian Village (焦店村)
- Zhangyao Village (张尧村)
- Fantang Village (范堂村)
- Wangzhuang Village (王庄村)
- Zhaozhuang Village (赵庄村)
- Sunzhangzhuang Village (孙张庄村)
- Erpu Village (二铺村)
- Wanzhuang Village (万庄村)
- Huangtongzhuang Village (黄通庄村)
- Yuhai Village (于海村)
- Zhuwangzhai Village (祝王寨村)
- Xiaowangzhuang Village (小王庄村)

== See also ==
- List of township-level divisions of Henan
