= Jiulongpo, Chongqing =

Coordinates: 29.5294°N 106.512°E

Jiulongpo 九龙坡区
- District
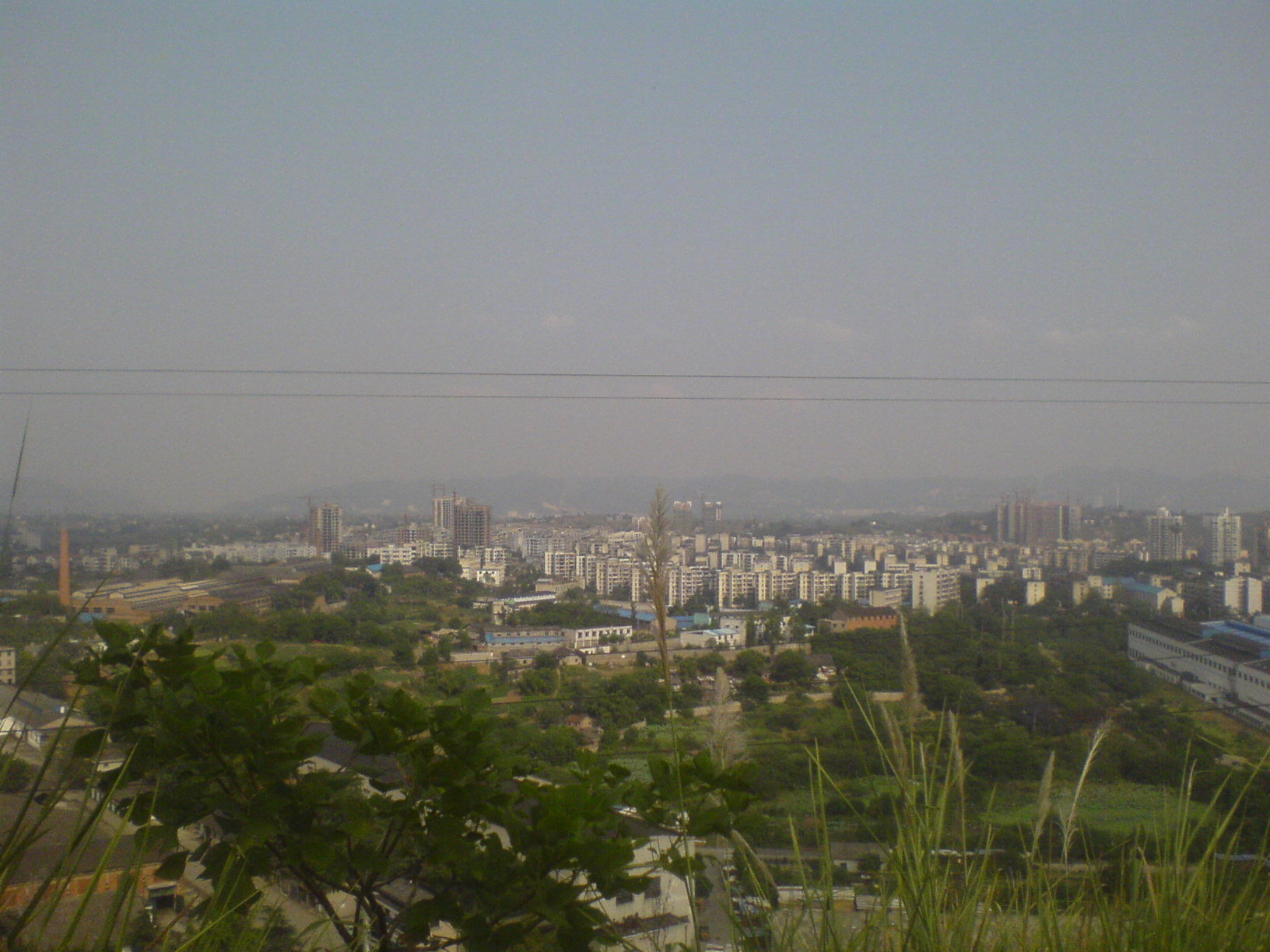

- Jiulongpo District in Chongqing
- Interactive map of Jiulongpo
- Country: People's Republic of China
- Municipality: Chongqing
- Time zone: UTC+8 (China Standard)

Jiulongpo (Chinese: 九龙坡; pinyin: Jiǔlóngpō Qū) is a district forming part of the western part of the Chongqing urban core (重庆主城区). It covers an area of 432 km², with a resident population of 1.54 million and an urbanization rate of 94%. Its 2024 GDP is 206 billion yuan.

== Location ==
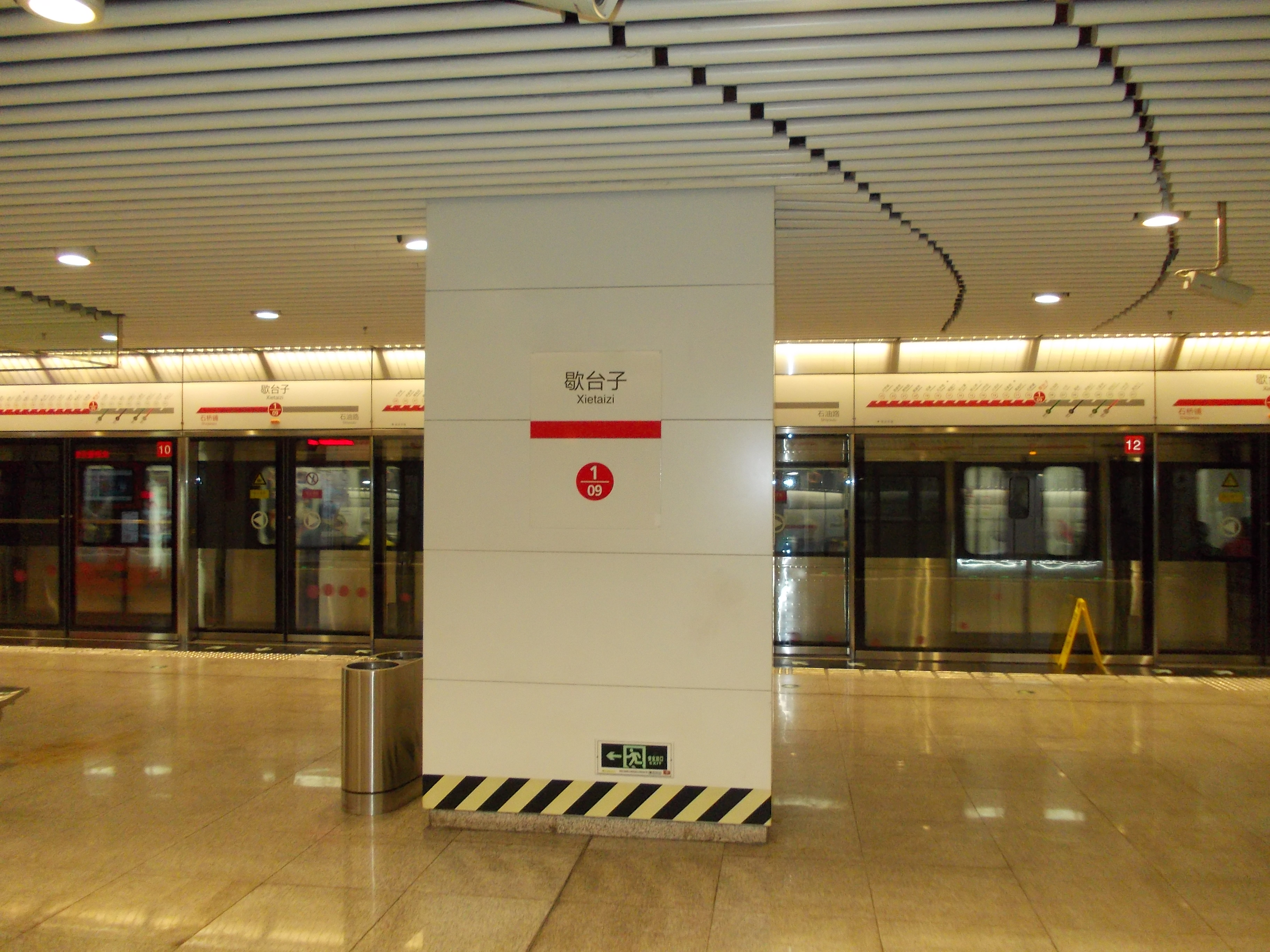
Xietaizi Station in Jiulongpo.

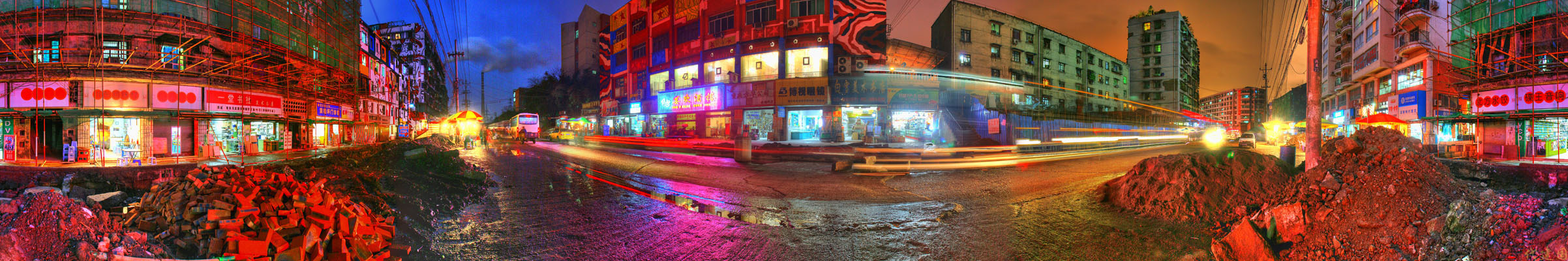
Graffiti Street: Tuyajie, Jiulongpo, Huangjueping, Chongqing.

Jiulongpo is one of the main districts in Chongqing, around which are Yuzhong, Shapingba and Dadukou, while Banan and Nan'an are separated from Jiulongpo with rivers. The government of Jiulongpo is in Yangjiaping.

== Geography ==
=== Topography ===
The Jinyun Mountain winds along its western border, while the Zhongliang Mountain Range stretches across the central part, dividing the entire region into eastern and western sections. To the east of the Zhongliang Mountains, the terrain is predominantly characterized by low hills, typically with elevations between 250 and 450 meters, mostly consisting of river valleys along the rivers below 300 meters in elevation. To the west of the Zhongliang Mountains, the terrain slopes from higher in the northwest to lower in the southeast, generally ranging in elevation from 180 to 400 meters, primarily featuring gentle hills and flat basins.

=== Climate ===
Jiulongpo District experiences a subtropical monsoon humid climate within the Sichuan Basin. It is characterized by abundant thermal and precipitation resources, with rainfall coinciding with warm seasons. Key features include limited sunshine, long frost-free periods, spring droughts accompanied by frequent late spring cold spells, hot summers prone to summer droughts, autumns marked by frequent prolonged drizzles, and winters with frequent fog. The annual average temperature ranges between 16 °C and 18 °C, with a frost-free period of approximately 342 days. The average yearly precipitation falls between 1,105 and 1,029 millimeters.

== Administrative divisions ==
Name	Chinese (S)	Hanyu Pinyin	Population (2010)	Area (km^{2})
Yangjiaping Subdistrict	杨家坪街道	Yángjiāpíng Jiēdào	111,578	3.1
Huangjueping Subdistrict	黄桷坪街道	Huángjuépíng Jiēdào	64,112	4.6
Xiejiawan Subdistrict	谢家湾街道	Xièjiāwān Jiēdào	78,227	3.8
Shipingqiao Subdistrict	石坪桥街道	Shípíngqiáo Jiēdào	72,281	1.3
Shiqiaopu Subdistrict	石桥铺街道	Shíqiáopù Jiēdào	143,928	7.643
Erlang Subdistrict	二郎街道	Èrláng Jiēdào	143,928	6.5
Zhongliangshan Subdistrict	中梁山街道	Zhōngliángshān Jiēdào	88,739	19.4
Yuzhou Road Subdistrict	渝州路街道	Yúzhōulù Jiēdào	90,840	159.812
Jiulong town	九龙镇	Jiǔlóng Zhèn	82,052	10
Huayan town	华岩镇	Huáyán Zhèn	46,677	25.5
Hangu town	含谷镇	Hángǔ Zhèn	37,175	29.5
Jinfeng town	金凤镇	Jīnfèng Zhèn	16,305	38.5
Baishiyi town	白市驿镇	Báishìyì Zhèn	74,989	52.3
Zouma town	走马镇	Zǒumǎ Zhèn	15,632	29.9
Shiban town	石板镇	Shíbǎn Zhèn	9,308	24.6
Bafu town	巴福镇	Bāfú Zhèn	14,728	18.15
Taojia town	陶家镇	Táojiā Zhèn	16,467	42.5
Xipeng town	西彭镇	Xīpéng Zhèn	102,020	87
Tongguanyi town	铜罐驿镇	Tóngguànyì Zhèn	19,361	23.2

=== Schools ===
The following schools are in Jiulongpo District:

- Chongqing Yucai Middle School
- Chongqing Qinghua Middle School

== Transport ==
=== Metro ===
Jiulongpo is currently served by two metro lines operated by Chongqing Rail Transit:

- Line 1 - Xietaizi, Shiqiaopu
- Line 2 - Yuanjiagang, Xiejiawan, Yangjiaping, Chongqing Zoo, Dayancun, Mawangchang

== See also ==
- Chongqing Zoo
