= List of Chongqing Rail Transit stations =

Map of Chongqing Rail Transit. (Not to scale)

The following is a list of stations found within Chongqing Rail Transit.

| Station code | Station name | | Line(s) | | | | Connections | Opened |
| Station code | English | Chinese | | | | | Connections | Opened |
|---|---|---|---|---|---|---|---|---|
| / / | Chongqing West Station | 重庆西站 | Loop | 5 | | | CXW | 20 January 2021 |
| / | Shangqiao | 上桥 | Loop | | | | | 20 January 2021 |
| / | Fengmingshan | 凤鸣山 | Loop | | | | | 20 January 2021 |
| / | Chongqing Library | 重庆图书馆 | Loop | | | | | 28 December 2018 |
| / | Tianxingqiao | 天星桥 | Loop | | | | | 4 February 2021 |
| / / / | Shapingba | 沙坪坝 | Loop | 1 | 9 | 27 | CYW | 28 July 2011 |
| / | Chongqing University (Note: Was "Shazhengjie" (沙正街) until 1 December 2019.) | 重庆大学 | Loop | | | | | 28 December 2018 |
| / / | Yudaishan | 玉带山 | Loop | 4 | | | | 28 December 2018 |
| / | Nanqiaosi | 南桥寺 | Loop | | | | | 15 December 2019 |
| / | Sports Park | 体育公园 | Loop | | | | | 28 December 2018 |
| / / / | Ranjiaba | 冉家坝 | Loop | 5 | 6 | | | 20 January 2013 |
| / | Dongbu Park | 动步公园 | Loop | | | | | 28 December 2018 |
| / | Honghudonglu | 洪湖东路 | Loop | | | | | 28 December 2018 |
| / / | Min'an Ave. | 民安大道 | Loop | 4 | | | | 1 January 2019 |
| / / / | Chongqing North Station South Square (Note: Was "Chongqingbei Railway Station" (重庆北站) until March 2016, and was "South Square of Chongqingbei Railway Station" until Line 10 opened.) | 重庆北站南广场 | Loop | 3 | 10 | | CUW | 29 September 2011 |
| / | Yulu | 渝鲁 | Loop | | | | | 28 December 2018 |
| / / / | Wulidian | 五里店 | Loop | 6 | 9 | | | 28 September 2012 |
| / | Danzishi | 弹子石 | Loop | | | | | 1 July 2019 |
| / | Tushan | 涂山 | Loop | | | | | 28 December 2018 |
| / | Renji | 仁济 | Loop | | | | | 4 February 2021 |
| / / | Shangxinjie | 五里店 | Loop | 6 | | | | 30 December 2014 |
| / | Shanghao | 上浩 | Loop | | | | | 7 October 2023 |
| / | Haitangxi | 海棠溪 | Loop | | | | | 28 December 2018 |
| / | Luojiaba | 罗家坝 | Loop | | | | | 1 July 2019 |
| / / | Sigongli | 四公里 | Loop | 3 | | | | 30 December 2011 |
| / / | Nanhu | 南湖 | Loop | 10 | | | | 28 December 2018 |
| / | Haixialu | 海峡路 | Loop | | | | | 28 December 2018 |
| / / | Xiejiawan | 谢家湾 | Loop | 2 | | | | 10 July 2006 |
| / / | Olympic Sports Center | 奥体中心 | Loop | 18 | | | | 30 December 2019 |
| / | Chenjiaping | 陈家坪 | Loop | | | | | 30 December 2019 |
| / | Caiyunhu | 彩云湖 | Loop | | | | | 30 December 2019 |
| / | Erlang | 二郎 | Loop | | | | | 30 December 2019 |
| / | Hualong | 华龙 | Loop | | | | | 20 January 2021 |
| / | Chaotianmen | 朝天门 | 1 | | | | | 31 December 2020 |
| / / | Xiaoshizi | 小什字 | 1 | 6 | 18 | | Yangtze River Cableway | 27 September 2011 |
| / / | Jiaochangkou | 较场口 | 1 | 2 | | | | 28 December 2004 |
| / / | Qixinggang | 七星岗 | 1 | 10 | 18 | | | 28 July 2011 |
| / / | Lianglukou | 两路口 | 1 | 3 | | | CQW (U/C); Huangguan Escalator | 28 July 2011 |
| / | Eling | 鹅岭 | 1 | | | | | 28 July 2011 |
| / / | Daping | 大坪 | 1 | 2 | | | | 28 December 2004 |
| / | Shiyoulu | 石油路 | 1 | | | | | 28 July 2011 |
| / / / | Xietaizi | 歇台子 | 1 | 5 | 18 | | | 28 July 2011 |
| / / | Shiqiaopu | 石桥铺 | 1 | 5 | 27 | | | 28 July 2011 |
| / | Gaomiaocun | 高庙村 | 1 | | | | | 17 October 2011 |
| / | Majiayan | 马家岩 | 1 | | | | | 25 September 2013 |
| / / | Xiaolongkan | 小龙坎 | 1 | 9 | | | | 28 July 2011 |
| / | Yanggongqiao | 杨公桥 | 1 | | | | | 20 December 2012 |
| / | Lieshimu | 烈士墓 | 1 | | | | | 20 December 2012 |
| / | Ciqikou | 磁器口 | 1 | 27 | | | | 20 December 2012 |
| / | Shijingpo | 石井坡 | 1 | | | | | 28 September 2014 |
| / | Shuangbei | 双碑 | 1 | | | | | 20 December 2012 |
| / | Laijiaqiao | 赖家桥 | 1 | | | | | 20 December 2012 |
| / | Weidianyuan | 微电园 | 1 | 7 | | | | 28 March 2013 |
| / | Chenjiaqiao | 陈家桥 | 1 | 15 | | | | 20 December 2012 |
| / | Daxuecheng | 大学城 | 1 | 17 | | | | 20 December 2012 |
| / | Jiandingpo | 尖顶坡 | 1 | | | | | 30 December 2014 |
| / / | Bishan | 璧山 | 1 | 27 | Bitong | | Bishan SkyShuttle | 30 December 2019 |
| / | Linjiangmen | 临江门 | 2 | | | | | 28 December 2004 |
| / | Huanghuayuan | 黄花园 | 2 | | | | | 18 June 2005 |
| / | Daxigou | 大溪沟 | 2 | | | | | 28 December 2004 |
| / / | Zengjiayan | 曾家岩 | 2 | 10 | | | | 15 June 2005 |
| / / | Niujiaotuo | 牛角沱 | 2 | 3 | | | | 28 December 2004 |
| / | Liziba | 李子坝 | 2 | | | | | 28 December 2004 |
| / | Fotuguan | 佛图关 | 2 | | | | | 9 April 2005 |
| / | Yuanjiagang | 袁家岗 | 2 | | | | | 28 December 2004 |
| / / | Yangjiaping | 杨家坪 | 2 | 18 | | | | 28 December 2004 |
| / | Zoo | 动物园 | 2 | | | | | 28 December 2004 |
| / | Dayancun | 大堰村 | 2 | | | | | 1 July 2006 |
| / | Mawangchang | 马王场 | 2 | | | | | 1 July 2006 |
| / | Ping'an | 平安 | 2 | | | | | 1 July 2006 |
| / | Dadukou | 大渡口 | 2 | | | | | 1 July 2006 |
| / | Xinshancun | 新山村 | 2 | | | | | 1 July 2006 |
| / | Tiantangbao | 天堂堡 | 2 | | | | | 30 December 2014 |
| / | Jianqiao | 建桥 | 2 | | | | | 30 December 2014 |
| / | Jinjiawan | 金家湾 | 2 | | | | | 30 December 2014 |
| / | Liujiaba | 刘家坝 | 2 | | | | | 30 December 2014 |
| / / | Baijusi | 白居寺 | 2 | 18 | | | | 30 December 2014 |
| / | Dajiang | 大江 | 2 | | | | | 30 December 2014 |
| / / | Yudong | 鱼洞 | 2 | | | | | 28 December 2012 |
| / | Jinzhu | 金竹 | 3 | | | | | 31 January 2013 |
| / | Yuhulu | 鱼胡路 | 3 | | | | | 28 December 2012 |
| / | Xuetangwan | 学堂湾 | 3 | | | | | 28 December 2012 |
| / | Dashancun | 大山村 | 3 | | | | | 28 December 2012 |
| / | Huaxi | 花溪 | 3 | | | | | 31 January 2013 |
| / | Chalukou | 岔路口 | 3 | | | | | 31 January 2013 |
| / | Jiugongli | 九公里 | 3 | | | | | 28 December 2012 |
| / | Qilong | 麒龙 | 3 | | | | | 28 December 2012 |
| / | Bagongli | 八公里 | 3 | | | | | 28 December 2012 |
| / | Chongqing Jiaotong University (Note: Was "Ertang" (二塘) until 1 December 2019.) | 重庆交通大学 | 3 | | | | | 30 December 2011 |
| / | Liugongli | 六公里 | 3 | | | | | 30 December 2011 |
| / | Chongqing Technology and Business University (Note: Was "Wugongli" (五公里) until 1 December 2019.) | 六公里 | 3 | | | | | 30 December 2011 |
| / / | Nanping | 南坪 | 3 | 10 | 27 | | | 30 December 2011 |
| / | Gongmao | 工贸 | 3 | | | | | 28 December 2012 |
| / | Tongyuanju | 铜元局 | 3 | | | | | 28 December 2012 |
| / | Huaxinjie | 华新街 | 3 | | | | | 29 September 2011 |
| / / | Guanyinqiao | 观音桥 | 3 | 9 | | | | 29 September 2011 |
| / / | Hongqihegou | 红旗河沟 | 3 | 6 | | | | 1 March 2012 |
| / / | Jiazhoulu | 嘉州路 | 3 | 4 | | | | 29 September 2011 |
| / | Zhengjiayuanzi | 郑家院子 | 3 | | | | | 1 May 2012 |
| / | Tangjiayuanzi | 唐家院子 | 3 | | | | | 29 September 2011 |
| / | Shiziping | 狮子坪 | 3 | | | | | 29 September 2011 |
| / | Longtousi | 龙头寺 | 3 | | | | | 5 February 2013 |
| / | Tongjiayuanzi | 童家院子 | 3 | | | | | 30 December 2011 |
| / | Jinyu | 金渝 | 3 | | | | | 29 September 2011 |
| / / | Jintonglu | 金童路 | 3 | 15 | | | | 29 September 2011 |
| / | Yuanyang | 鸳鸯 | 3 | | | | | 29 September 2011 |
| / | The EXPO Garden | 园博园 | 3 | | | | | 8 October 2011 |
| / | Cuiyun | 翠云 | 3 | | | | | 8 October 2011 |
| / | Changfulu | 长福路 | 3 | | | | | 8 October 2011 |
| / | Huixing | 回兴 | 3 | | | | | 30 December 2011 |
| / | Shuanglong | 双龙 | 3 | | | | | 30 December 2011 |
| / | Bijin | 碧津 | 3 | | | | | 30 December 2011 |
| / / | Terminal 2 of Jiangbei Airport | 江北机场T2航站楼 | 3 | 10 | | | | 30 December 2011 |
| / | Shuangfengqiao | 双凤桥 | 3 | | | | | 28 December 2016 |
| / | Konggang Square | 空港广场 | 3 | | | | | 28 December 2016 |
| / | Gaobaohu | 高堡湖 | 3 | | | | | 28 December 2016 |
| / | Guanyuelu | 观月路 | 3 | | | | | 28 December 2016 |
| / | Lianhua | 莲花 | 3 | | | | | 28 December 2016 |
| / | Jurenba | 举人坝 | 3 | | | | | 28 December 2016 |
| / | Shunshuisi Park | 顺水寺公园 | 4 | | | | | Unopened |
| / | Shimahelijiao | 石马河立交 | 4 | | | | | 10 February 2026 |
| / | Panxi | 盘溪 | 4 | | | | | 10 February 2026 |
| / / | Dashiba | 大石坝 | 4 | 5 | | | | 24 December 2018 |
| / | Daqingcun | 大庆村 | 4 | | | | | 10 February 2026 |
| / / | Huahuiyuan | 花卉园 | 4 | 6 | | | | 28 September 2012 |
| / | Longxi | 龙溪 | 4 | | | | | 10 February 2026 |
| / / | Chongqing North Station North Square | 重庆北站北广场 | 4 | 10 | | | CUW | 28 December 2017 |
| / / | Toutang | 头塘 | 4 | 9 | | | | 28 December 2018 |
| / / | Baoshuigang | 保税港 | 4 | 9 | | | | 28 December 2018 |
| / | Cuntan | 寸滩 | 4 | | | | | 28 December 2018 |
| / | Heishizi | 黑石子 | 4 | | | | | 28 December 2018 |
| / | Gangcheng | 港城 | 4 | | | | | 7 October 2023 |
| / | Taipingchong | 太平冲 | 4 | | | | | 28 December 2018 |
| / | Tangjiatuo | 唐家沱 | 4 | | | | | 28 December 2018 |
| / | Tieshanping | 铁山坪 | 4 | | | | | 18 June 2022 |
| / | Luqi | 鹿栖 | 4 | | | | | 18 June 2022 |
| / | Guoyuan Logistics Hub | 果园物流枢纽 | 4 | | | | | 18 June 2022 |
| / | Tieshanping | 鱼嘴 | 4 | | | | | 18 June 2022 |
| / | Yanping | 雁坪 | 4 | | | | | 18 June 2022 |
| / | Shiheqing | 石河清 | 4 | | | | | 18 June 2022 |
| / / | Fusheng | 复盛 | 4 | 15 | | | FAW | 18 June 2022 |
| / | Sanbaxi | 三板溪 | 4 | | | | | 18 June 2022 |
| / | Longyi Ave. | 龙驿大道 | 4 | | | | | 18 June 2022 |
| / | Longxing | 龙兴 | 4 | | | | | 18 June 2022 |
| / | Gaoshita | 高石塔 | 4 | | | | | 18 June 2022 |
| / | Pufu | 普福 | 4 | | | | | 18 June 2022 |
| / | Tongzilin | 桐梓林 | 4 | | | | | 18 June 2022 |
| / | Shichuan | 石船 | 4 | | | | | 18 June 2022 |
| / | Huangling | 黄岭 | 4 | | | | | 18 June 2022 |
| / | Yuegangbeilu | 悦港北路 | 5 | | | | | 27 February 2023 |
| / | Yuegang Ave. | 悦港大道 | 5 | | | | | 27 February 2023 |
| / | Chunxuan Ave. | 椿萱大道 | 5 | | | | | 27 February 2023 |
| / / | Central Park West | 中央公园西 | 5 | 10 | | | | 28 December 2017 |
| / | Lujiagou | 鲁家沟道 | 5 | | | | | 27 February 2023 |
| / | Ganyue Ave. | 甘悦大道 | 5 | | | | | 27 February 2023 |
| / | Yuhegou | 玉河沟 | 5 | | | | | 15 July 2025 |
| / | The EXPO Garden Center | 园博中心 | 5 | | | | | 28 December 2017 |
| / | Danhe | 丹鹤 | 5 | | | | | 28 December 2017 |
| / | Huxiajie | 湖霞街 | 5 | | | | | 28 December 2017 |
| / / | Chongguang | 重光 | 5 | | | | | 28 December 2017 |
| / | Hemulu | 和睦路 | 5 | | | | | 28 December 2017 |
| / | Renhe | 人和 | 5 | | | | | 28 December 2017 |
| / | Xingfu Square | 幸福广场 | 5 | | | | | 28 December 2017 |
| / / | Dalongshan | 大龙山 | 5 | 6 | | | | 28 September 2012 |
| / | Zhongshutuo | 忠恕沱 | 5 | | | | | 30 November 2023 |
| / / | Hongyancun | 红岩村 | 5 | 9 | | | | 25 January 2022 |
| / | Shixinlu | 石新路 | 5 | | | | | 20 January 2021 |
| / | Bashan | 巴山 | 5 | | | | | 20 January 2021 |
| / | Fengxilu | 凤西路 | 5 | | | | | 20 January 2021 |
| / | Huayan Temple | 华岩寺 | 5 | | | | | 20 January 2021 |
| / | Huachenglu | 华成路 | 5 | | | | | 20 January 2021 |
| / | Banshan | 半山 | 5 | | | | | 20 January 2021 |
| / | Zhongliangshan | 中梁山 | 5 | | | | | 20 January 2021 |
| / | Jinjianlu | 金建路 | 5 | | | | | 20 January 2021 |
| / | Huayan Center | 华岩中心 | 5 | | | | | 20 January 2021 |
| / / / | Tiaodeng | 跳磴 | 5 | 18 | Jiangtiao | | | 20 January 2021 |
| / | Chayuan | 茶园 | 6 | | | | | 30 December 2014 |
| / | Qiujiawan | 邱家湾 | 6 | | | | | 30 December 2014 |
| / | Changshengqiao | 长生桥 | 6 | | | | | 30 December 2014 |
| / | Liujiaping | 刘家坪 | 6 | | | | | 30 December 2014 |
| / | Grand Theater | 大剧院 | 6 | | | | | 30 December 2014 |
| / / | Jiangbeicheng | 江北城 | 6 | 9 | | | | 28 January 2016 |
| / / | Hongtudi | 红土地 | 6 | 10 | | | | 28 June 2012 |
| / | Huangnibang | 黄泥磅 | 6 | | | | | 28 June 2012 |
| / | Guangdianyuan | 光电园 | 6 | | | | | 28 June 2012 |
| / | Dazhulin | 大竹林 | 6 | | | | | 28 June 2012 |
| / | Kangzhuang | 康庄 | 6 | | | | | 28 June 2012 |
| / | Jiuquhe | 九曲河 | 6 | | | | | 28 September 2014 |
| / | Lijia | 礼嘉 | 6 | | | | | 26 December 2012 |
| / / | Jinshansi | 金山寺 | 6 | 15 | | | | 31 December 2013 |
| / | Caojiawan | 曹家湾 | 6 | | | | | 26 October 2015 |
| / | Caijia | 蔡家 | 6 | | | | | 31 December 2013 |
| / | Xiangjiagang | 向家岗 | 6 | | | | | 26 November 2014 |
| / | Longfengxi | 龙凤溪 | 6 | | | | | 31 December 2013 |
| / | Zhuangyuanbei | 状元碑 | 6 | | | | | 31 December 2013 |
| / | Southwest University | 西南大学 (Note: Was "Tiansheng" (天生) until 1 December 2019.) | 6 | | | | | 28 September 2014 |
| / | Beibei | 北碚 | 6 | | | | | 31 December 2013 |
| / / | Happy Valley (Note: Was "Pingchang" (平场) until March 2017.) | 欢乐谷 | 6 | 15 | | | | 28 February 2015 |
| / | Huangmaoping | 黄茅坪 | 6 | | | | | 28 February 2015 |
| / | Gaoyikou | 高义口 | 6 | | | | | 26 October 2015 |
| / | International Expo Center | 国博中心 | 6 | | | | | 15 May 2013 |
| / / | Yuelai | 悦来 | 6 | 10 | | | | 15 May 2013 |
| / / | Wangjiazhuang | 王家庄 | 6 | 10 | | | | 28 December 2017 |
| / | Qingxihe | 清溪河 | 6 | | | | | 31 December 2020 |
| / | Liujiayuanzi | 刘家院子 | 6 | | | | | 31 December 2020 |
| / | Siyuan | 思源 | 6 | | | | | 31 December 2020 |
| / | Fuxing | 复兴 | 6 | | | | | 31 December 2020 |
| / | Hongyanping | 红岩坪 | 6 | | | | | 31 December 2020 |
| / | Shaheba | 沙河坝 | 6 | | | | | 31 December 2020 |
| / | Chongqingdong Railway Station | 重庆东站 | 6 | 24 | 27 | | | 27 June 2025 |
| / | Taohuaqiao | 桃花桥 | 6 | | | | | 27 June 2025 |
| / | Baileyuan | 百乐园 | 6 | | | | | 27 June 2025 |
| / | Xinqiao | 新桥 | 9 | | | | | Unopened |
| / | Gaotanyan | 高滩岩 | 9 | | | | | 25 January 2022 |
| / | Tianlilu | 天梨路 | 9 | | | | | 25 January 2022 |
| / | Tuwan | 土湾 | 9 | | | | | 25 January 2022 |
| / / | Gaotanyan | 富华路 | 9 | 18 | | | | 25 January 2022 |
| / | Hualongqiao | 化龙桥 | 9 | | | | | 25 January 2022 |
| / | Lijiaping | 李家坪 | 9 | | | | | 25 January 2022 |
| / | Mahuangliang | 蚂蝗梁 | 9 | | | | | 25 January 2022 |
| / / | Liyuchi | 鲤鱼池 | 9 | 10 | | | | 28 December 2017 |
| / | Gailanxi | 溉澜溪 | 9 | | | | | 25 January 2022 |
| / | Cruise Port Station | 邮轮母港 | 9 | | | | | Unopened |
| / | Hejialiang | 何家梁 | 9 | | | | | 25 January 2022 |
| / | Shipanhe | 石盘河 | 9 | | | | | 25 January 2022 |
| / / | Shangwanlu | 上湾路 | 9 | 10 | | | | 28 December 2017 |
| / | Qinggangping | 青岗坪 | 9 | | | | | 25 January 2022 |
| / / | Baoshenghu | 宝圣湖 | 9 | 15 | | | | 28 July 2022 |
| / | Xingke Ave. | 兴科大道 | 9 | | | | | 25 January 2022 |
| / | Chunhua Ave. | 春华大道 | 9 | | | | | 18 January 2023 |
| / | Langui Ave. | 兰桂大道 | 9 | | | | | 18 January 2023 |
| / / | Central Park East | 中央公园东 | 9 | 10 | | | | 28 December 2017 |
| / | Congyansi | 丛岩寺 | 9 | | | | | 18 January 2023 |
| / | Huashigou | 花石沟 | 9 | | | | | 18 January 2023 |
| / | Lanhualu | 兰花路 | 10 | | | | | 30 October 2023 |
| / | Wanshoulu | 万寿路 | 10 | | | | | 30 October 2023 |
| / | Houbao | 后堡 | 10 | | | | | 18 January 2023 |
| / | Chongqing People's Auditorium | 大礼堂 | 10 | | | | | 30 October 2023 |
| / | Longtousi Park | 龙头寺公园 | 10 | | | | | 28 December 2017 |
| / | Minxinjiayuan | 民心佳园 | 10 | | | | | 28 December 2017 |
| / | Sanyawan | 三亚湾 | 10 | | | | | 28 December 2017 |
| / | Huanshan Park | 环山公园 | 10 | | | | | 28 December 2017 |
| / | Changhe | 长河 | 10 | | | | | 28 December 2017 |
| / / | Terminal 3 of Jiangbei Airport | 江北机场T3航站楼 | 10 | 15 | | | JCE | 28 December 2017 |
| / | Yubei Square | 渝北广场 | 10 | | | | | 28 December 2017 |
| / | Lushan | 鹿山 | 10 | | | | | 28 December 2017 |
| / | Central Park | 中央公园 | 10 | | | | | 28 December 2017 |
| / | Jingkou | 井口 | 15 | | | | | 12 February 2026 |
| / | Lixuelu | 礼学路 | 15 | | | | | 12 February 2026 |
| / | Chongguanglijiao | 重光立交 | 15 | | | | | 12 February 2026 |
| / | Jinfulu | 金福路 | 15 | | | | | 12 February 2026 |
| / | Guotanglu | 果塘路 | 15 | | | | | 12 February 2026 |
| / | Southwest University of Political Science and Law | 西南政法大学 | 15 | | | | | 12 February 2026 |
| / | Shuanglonghu | 双龙湖 | 15 | | | | | 12 February 2026 |
| / | Tianbao | 天堡 | 15 | | | | | 12 February 2026 |
| / | Longgangdadao | 龙港大道 | 15 | | | | | 12 February 2026 |
| / | Fuhuidadao | 福惠大道 | 15 | | | | | 12 February 2026 |
| / | Liangjiang Movie City | 两江影视城 | 15 | | | | | 12 February 2026 |
| / | Shipingqiao | 石坪桥 | 18 | | | | | 28 December 2023 |
| / | Tanzikou | 滩子口 | 18 | | | | | 28 December 2023 |
| / | Huangjueping | 黄桷坪 | 18 | | | | | 28 December 2023 |
| / | Sichuan Fine Arts Institute | 四川美术学院 | 18 | | | | | 28 December 2023 |
| / | Dianchang | 电厂 | 18 | | | | | 28 December 2023 |
| / | Lijiatuodaqiao | 李家沱大桥 | 18 | | | | | 28 December 2023 |
| / | Chongqing University of Technology | 重庆理工大学 | 18 | | | | | 28 December 2023 |
| / | Huaxi Industrial Park | 花溪工业园 | 18 | | | | | 28 December 2023 |
| / | Babinlu Wetland Park | 巴滨路湿地公园 | 18 | | | | | 28 December 2023 |
| / | Qiezixi | 茄子溪 | 18 | | | | | 28 December 2023 |
| / | Funiuxi | 伏牛溪 | 18 | | | | | 28 December 2023 |
| / | Jin'aoshan | 金鳌山 | 18 | | | | | 28 December 2023 |
| / | Tiaodengnan | 跳磴南 | 18 | | | | | 28 December 2023 |
| / | Shilinsi | 石林寺 | Jiangtiao | | | | | 6 August 2022 |
| / | Jiulongyuan | 九龙园 | Jiangtiao | | | | | 6 August 2022 |
| / | Shuangfu | 双福 | Jiangtiao | | | | | 6 August 2022 |
| / | Xiangtang | 享堂 | Jiangtiao | | | | | 6 August 2022 |
| / | Jiangjin High-Speed Railway | 江津高铁 | Jiangtiao | | | | JAE | 6 August 2022 |
| / | Shengquansi | 圣泉寺 | Jiangtiao | | | | | 6 August 2022 |
| / | Jijiang | 几江 | Jiangtiao | | | | | Unopened |
| / | Dingshan | 鼎山 | Jiangtiao | | | | | Unopened |
| / | Tongliangxi | 铜梁西 | Bitong | | | | | 2 January 2025 |
| / | Tongliang Longcheng Paradise Walk | 铜梁龙城天街 | Bitong | | | | | 2 January 2025 |
| / | Sci-Tech Innovation Center | 科创新城 | Bitong | | | | | 2 January 2025 |
| / | Qinglong | 庆隆 | Bitong | | | | | 2 January 2025 |
| / | Dalu | 大路 | Bitong | | | | | 2 January 2025 |
| / | Qinglonghu | 青龙湖 | Bitong | | | | | Unopened |
| / | Hebian | 河边 | Bitong | | | | | 2 January 2025 |
| / | Bicheng | 璧城 | Bitong | | | | | 2 January 2025 |
