= International Expo Center station (Chongqing Rail Transit) =

Metro station in Chongqing, China

International Expo Center 国博中心
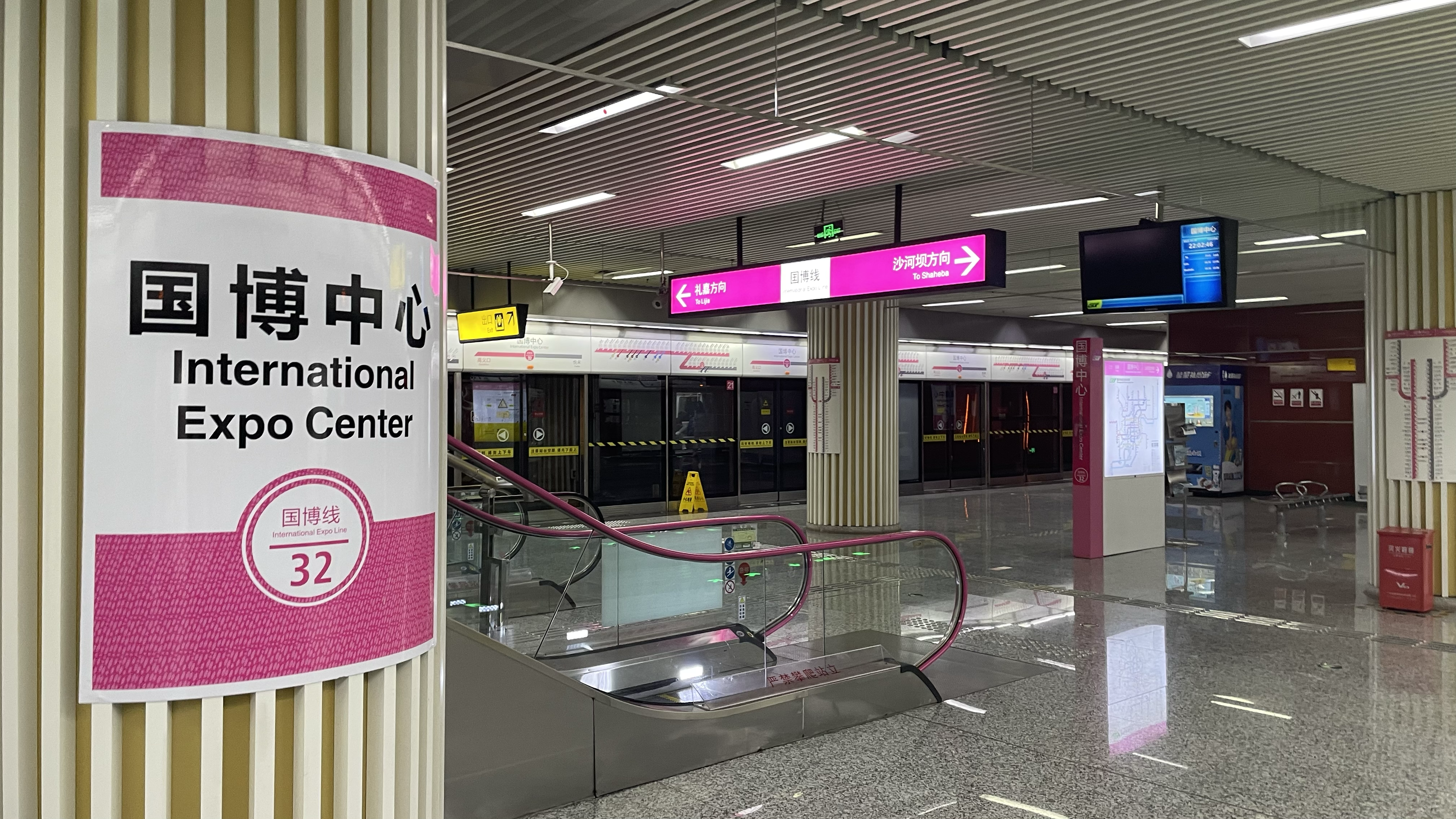

General information
- Location: Yubei District, Chongqing; China
- Coordinates: 29°43′10″N 106°32′30″E
- Operator: Chongqing Rail Transit Corp., Ltd
- Line: Line 6 (International Expo Branch)

Construction
- Structure type: Underground

Other information
- Station code: /

History
- Opened: 15 May 2013; 13 years ago

Services
Preceding station	Chongqing Rail Transit	Following station
Gaoyikou towards Lijia	Line 6 International Expo branch	Yuelai towards Shaheba
Location

International Expo Center is a station on International Expo Branch of Line 6 of Chongqing Rail Transit in Chongqing Municipality, China. It is located in Yubei District.
