= Qingxihe station =

Chongqing Rail Transit station

Coordinates: 29.7667°N 106.5442°E

Qingxihe 清溪河
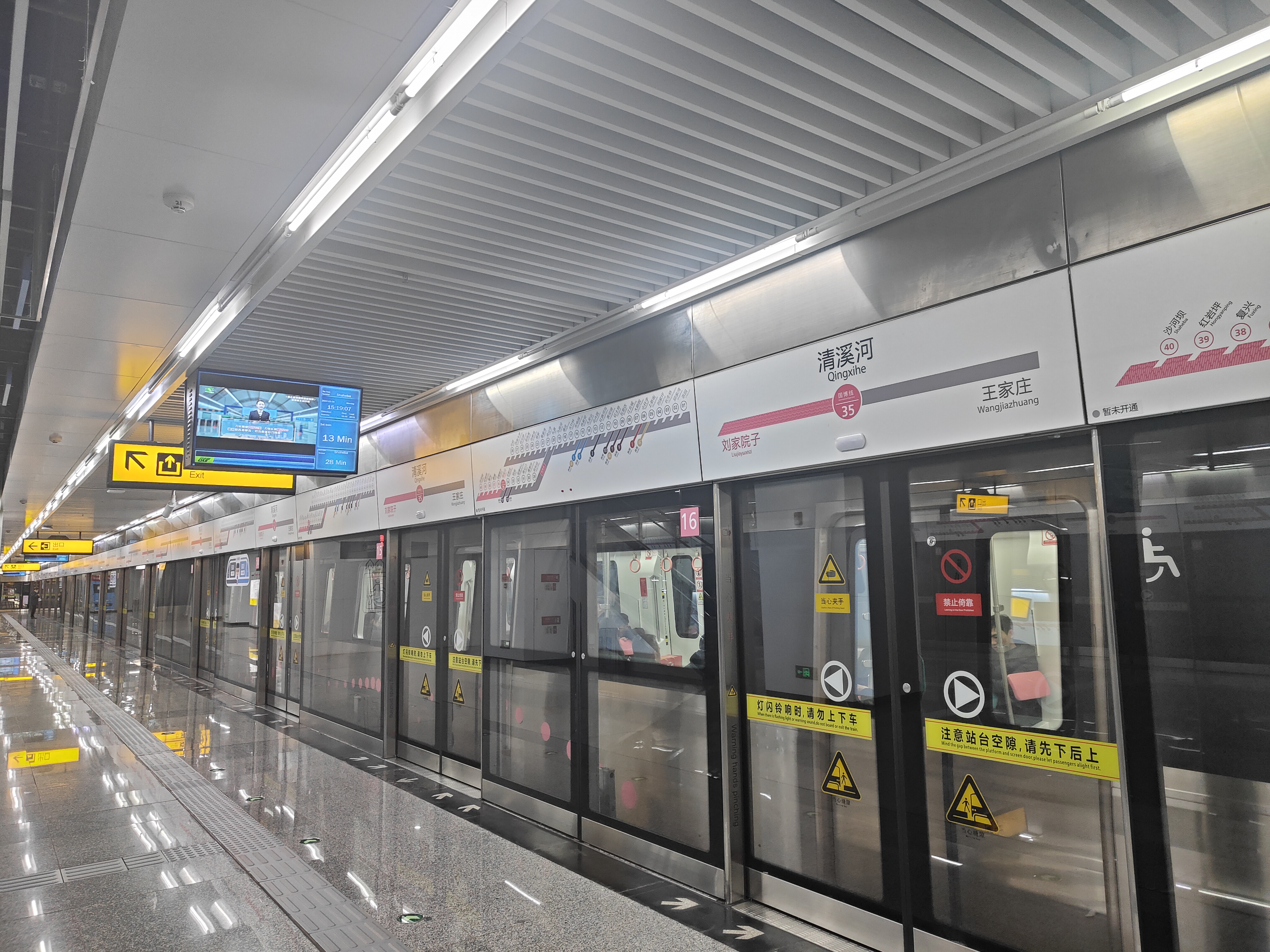

General information
- Location: Chongqing; China
- Operated by: Chongqing Rail Transit Corp., Ltd
- Line(s): Line 6 (International Expo Branch)
- Platforms: 2 (1 island platform)

Construction
- Structure type: Underground

Other information
- Station code: 6/35

History
- Opened: 31 December 2020; 4 years ago

Services
Preceding station	Chongqing Rail Transit	Following station
Wangjiazhuang towards Lijia	Line 6 International Expo branch	Liujiayuanzi towards Shaheba

Qingxihe Station is a station on International Expo branch of Line 6 of Chongqing Rail Transit in Chongqing municipality, China, which opened in 2020. It is located in Beibei District.
