= Yuelai station =

Chongqing Rail Transit station

Yuelai 悦来
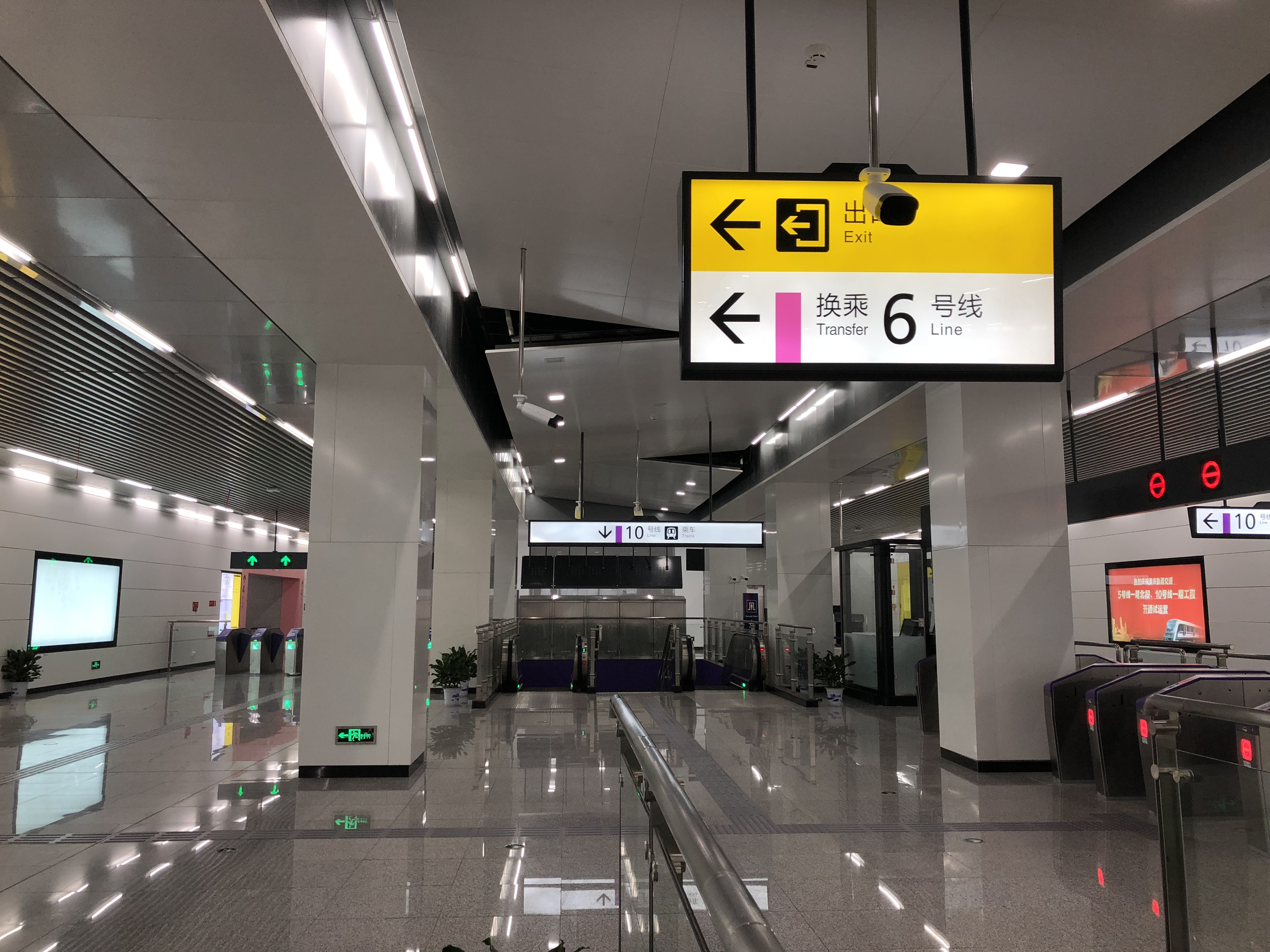

General information
- Location: Chongqing; China
- Coordinates: 29.7286°N 106.5442°E
- Operator: Chongqing Rail Transit Corp., Ltd
- Lines: Line 6 (International Expo Branch); Line 10
- Platforms: 4 (2 island platforms)

Construction
- Structure type: Underground

Other information
- Station code: 6/33, 10/26

History
- Opened: 15 May 2013; 13 years ago (Line 6 International Expo Branch); 28 December 2017; 8 years ago (Line 10)

Services
Preceding station	Chongqing Rail Transit	Following station
International Expo Center towards Lijia	Line 6 International Expo branch	Wangjiazhuang towards Shaheba
Central Park West towards Lanhualu	Line 10	Wangjiazhuang Terminus
Location

Yuelai Station is an interchange station between Line 10 and International Expo Branch of Line 6 of Chongqing Rail Transit in Chongqing municipality, China. It is located in Yubei District, adjacent to Chongqing International Expo Center and opened in 2013 with the opening of Line 6 International Expo Branch. It had also served as the northern terminus of Line 6 International Expo Branch until Phase II opened in 2020.

== Station structure ==
B1; Concourse	Exits, Customer service, Vending machines
B2; Platforms	Line 6 – International Expo branch to Lijia (International Expo Center)
B2; Platforms	Island platform
B2; Platforms	Line 6 – International Expo branch to Shaheba (Wangjiazhuang)
B2; Platforms	Line 10 to Lanhualu (Central Park West)
B2; Platforms	Island platform
B2; Platforms	Line 10 to Wangjiazhuang (Terminus)
