= Gaoyikou station =

Chongqing Rail Transit station

Gaoyikou 高义口
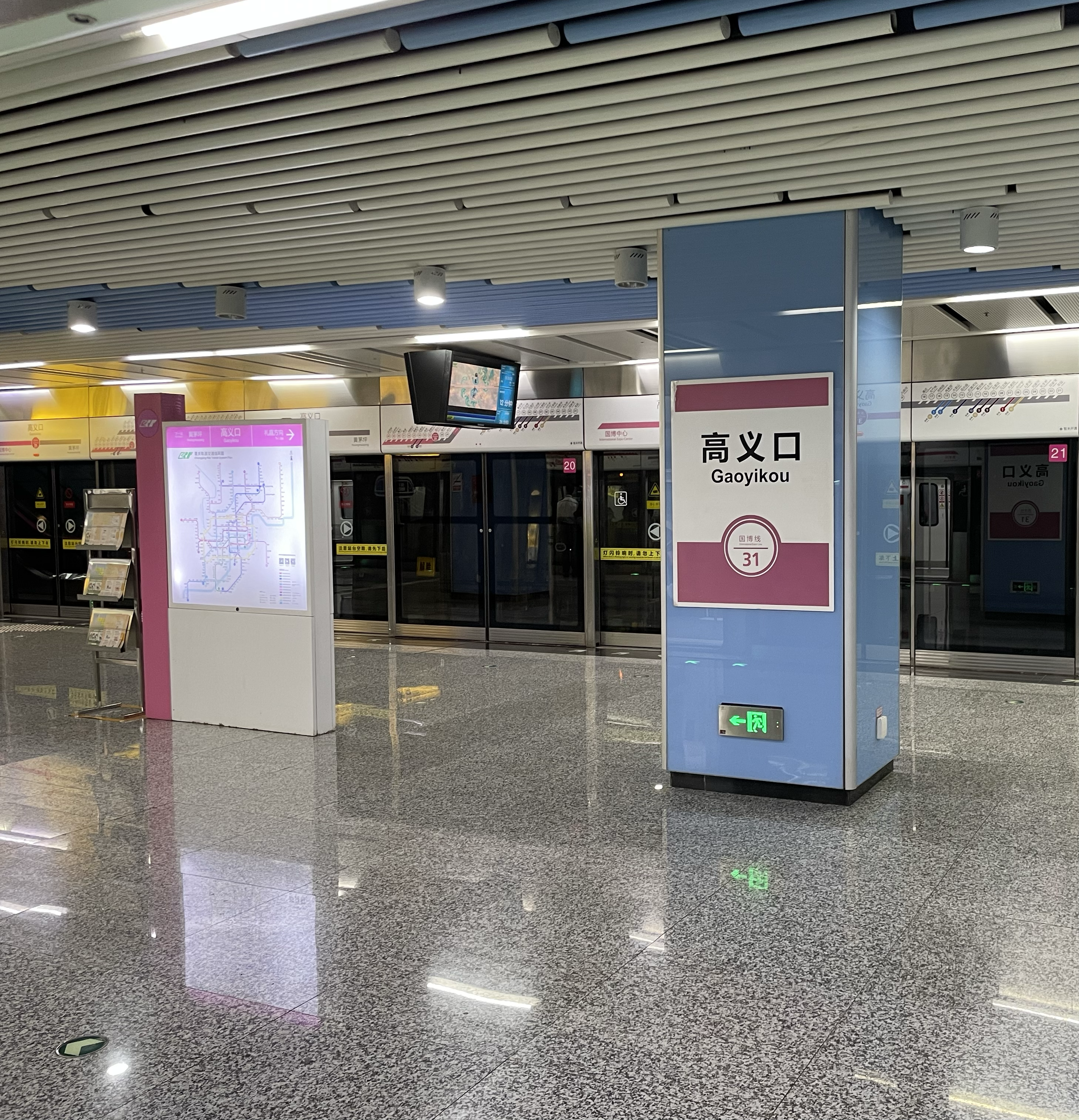

General information
- Location: Chongqing; China
- Operator: Chongqing Rail Transit Corp., Ltd
- Line: Line 6 (International Expo Branch)
- Platforms: 2 (1 island platform)

Construction
- Structure type: Underground

Other information
- Station code: 6/31

History
- Opened: 26 October 2015; 11 years ago

Services
Preceding station	Chongqing Rail Transit	Following station
Huangmaoping towards Lijia	Line 6 International Expo branch	International Expo Center towards Shaheba
Location

Gaoyikou Station is a station on International Expo branch of Line 6 of Chongqing Rail Transit in Chongqing municipality, China, which opened as an infill station in 2015. It is located in Yubei District.
