= Jiuquhe station =

Metro station in Chongqing, China

Jiuquhe 九曲河
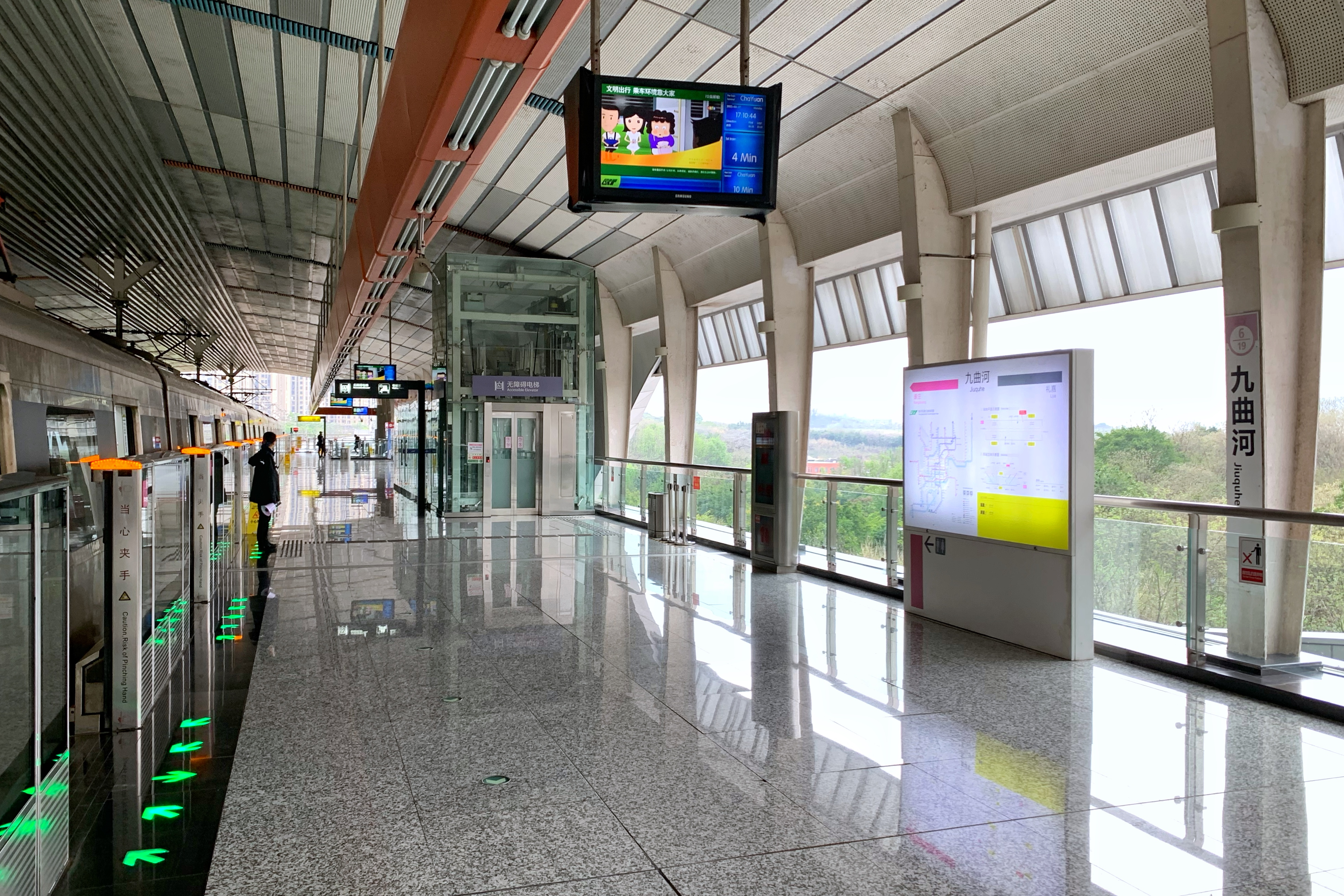

General information
- Location: Chongqing; China
- Coordinates: 29.6566°N 106.479°E
- Operator: Chongqing Rail Transit Corp., Ltd
- Line: Line 6
- Platforms: 2 side platforms

Construction
- Structure type: Elevated

Other information
- Station code: 6/19

History
- Opened: 28 September 2014; 12 years ago

Services
Preceding station	Chongqing Rail Transit	Following station
Kangzhuang towards Chayuan	Line 6	Lijia towards Beibei
Location

Jiuquhe is a station on Line 6 of Chongqing Rail Transit in Chongqing Municipality, China. It is located in Yubei District and opened in 2014.

== Station structure ==
3F; Platforms	Side platform
3F; Platforms	Line 6 to Beibei (Lijia)
3F; Platforms	Line 6 to Chayuan (Kangzhuang)
3F; Platforms	Side platform
2F; Concourse	Exits, Customer service, Vending machines, Toilets
