= Hongyanping station =

Chongqing Rail Transit station

Hongyanping 红岩坪
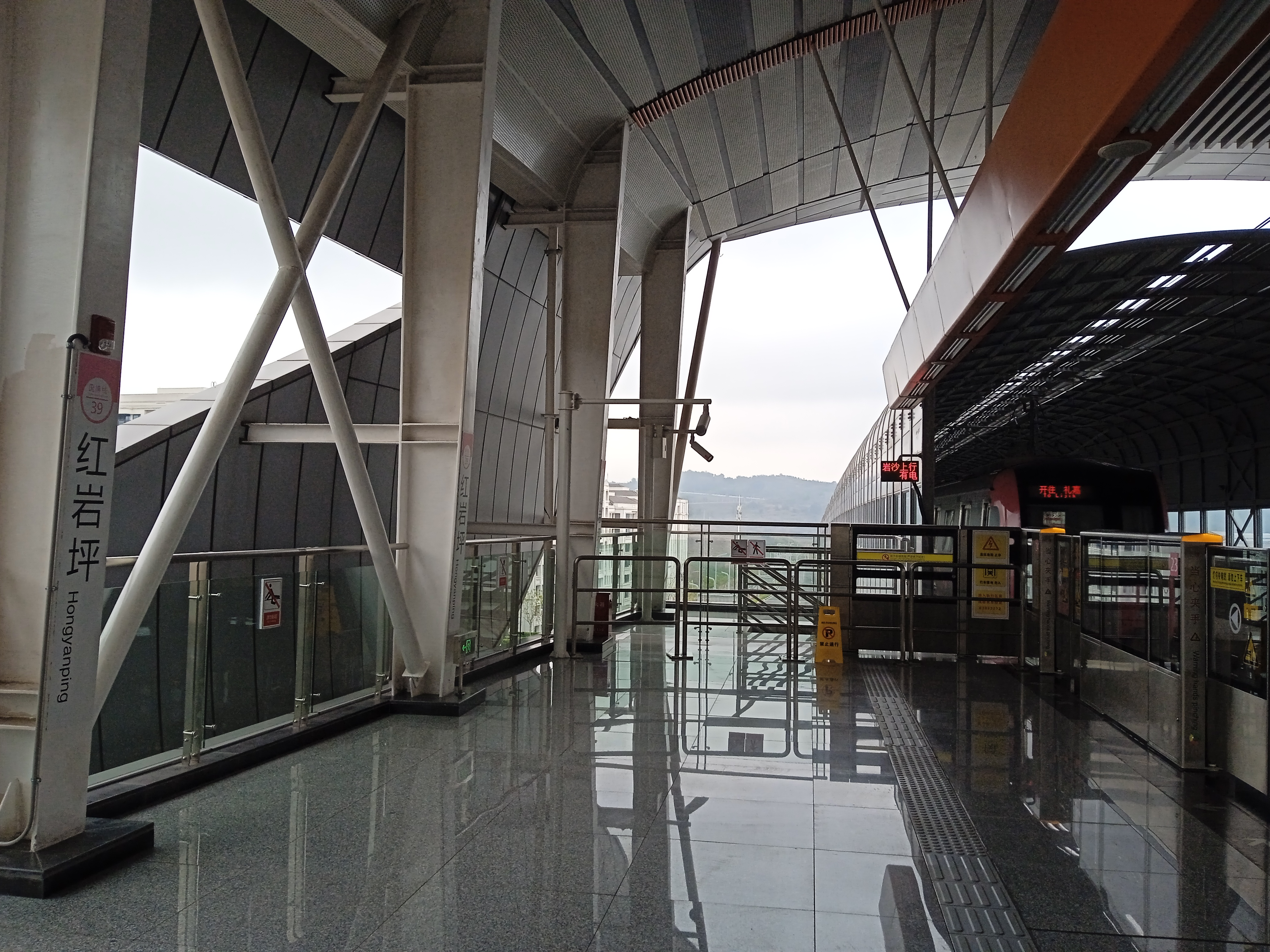

General information
- Location: Chongqing; China
- Coordinates: 29.8359°N 106.5456°E
- Operated by: Chongqing Rail Transit Corp., Ltd
- Line: Line 6 (International Expo Branch)
- Platforms: 2 side platforms

Construction
- Structure type: Elevated

Other information
- Station code: 6/39

History
- Opened: 31 December 2020; 5 years ago

Services
Preceding station	Chongqing Rail Transit	Following station
Fuxing towards Lijia	Line 6 International Expo branch	Shaheba Terminus
Location

Hongyanping Station is a station on International Expo branch of Line 6 of Chongqing Rail Transit in Chongqing municipality, China, which opened in 2020. It is located in Beibei District.
