= Kangzhuang station =

Metro station in Chongqing, China

Kangzhuang 康庄
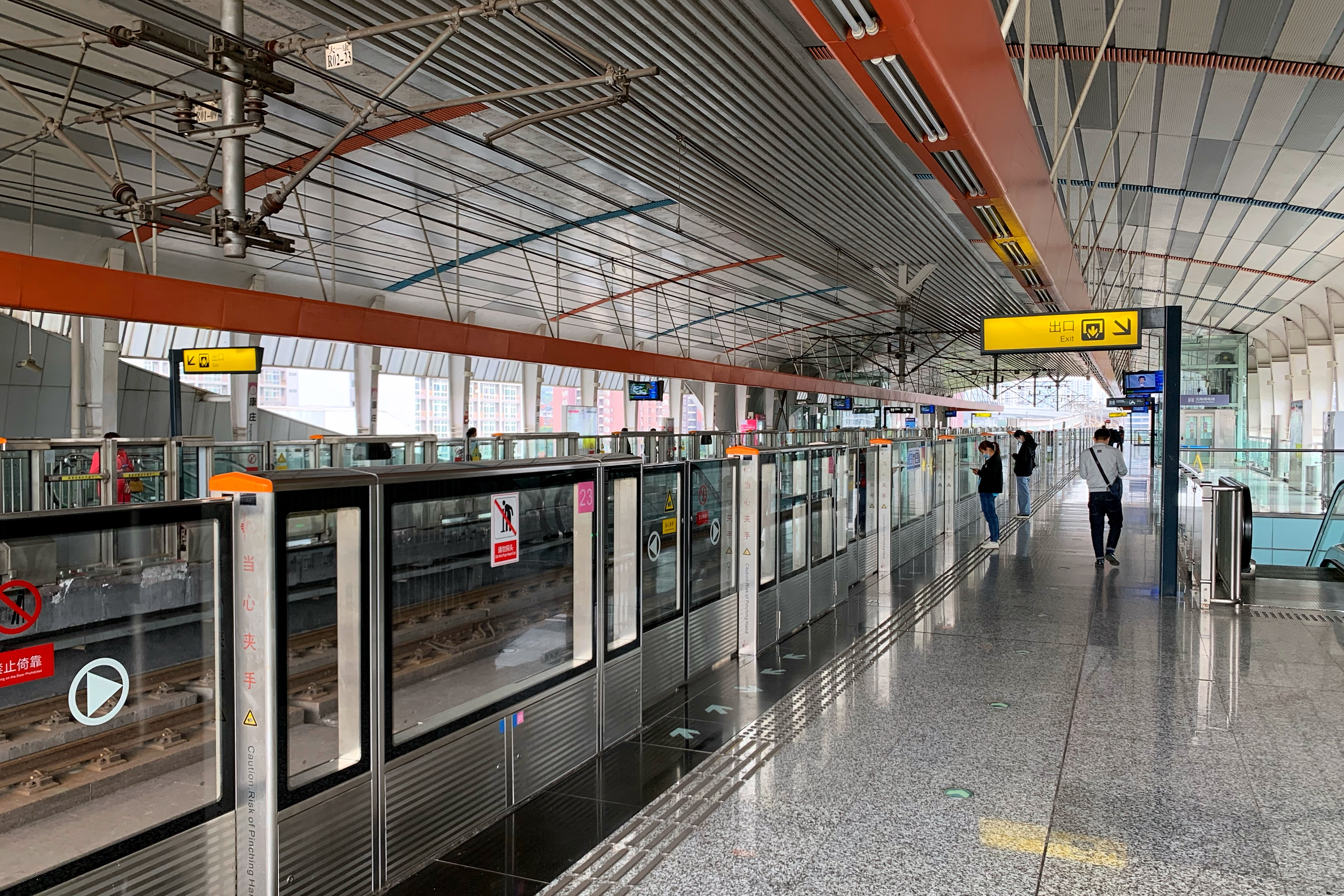

General information
- Location: Chongqing; China
- Operator: Chongqing Rail Transit Corp., Ltd
- Line: Line 6
- Platforms: 2 side platforms

Construction
- Structure type: Elevated

Other information
- Station code: 6/18

History
- Opened: 28 September 2012; 14 years ago

Services
Preceding station	Chongqing Rail Transit	Following station
Dazhulin towards Chayuan	Line 6	Jiuquhe towards Beibei
Location

Kangzhuang is a station on Line 6 of Chongqing Rail Transit in Chongqing Municipality, China. It is located in Yubei District. It opened in 2012.

== Station structure ==
3F; Platforms	Side platform
3F; Platforms	Line 6 to Beibei (Jiuquhe)
3F; Platforms	Line 6 to Chayuan (Dazhulin)
3F; Platforms	Side platform
2F; Concourse	Exits, Customer service, Vending machines, Toilets
