= Liujiaping station =

Metro station in Chongqing, China

Liujiaping 刘家坪
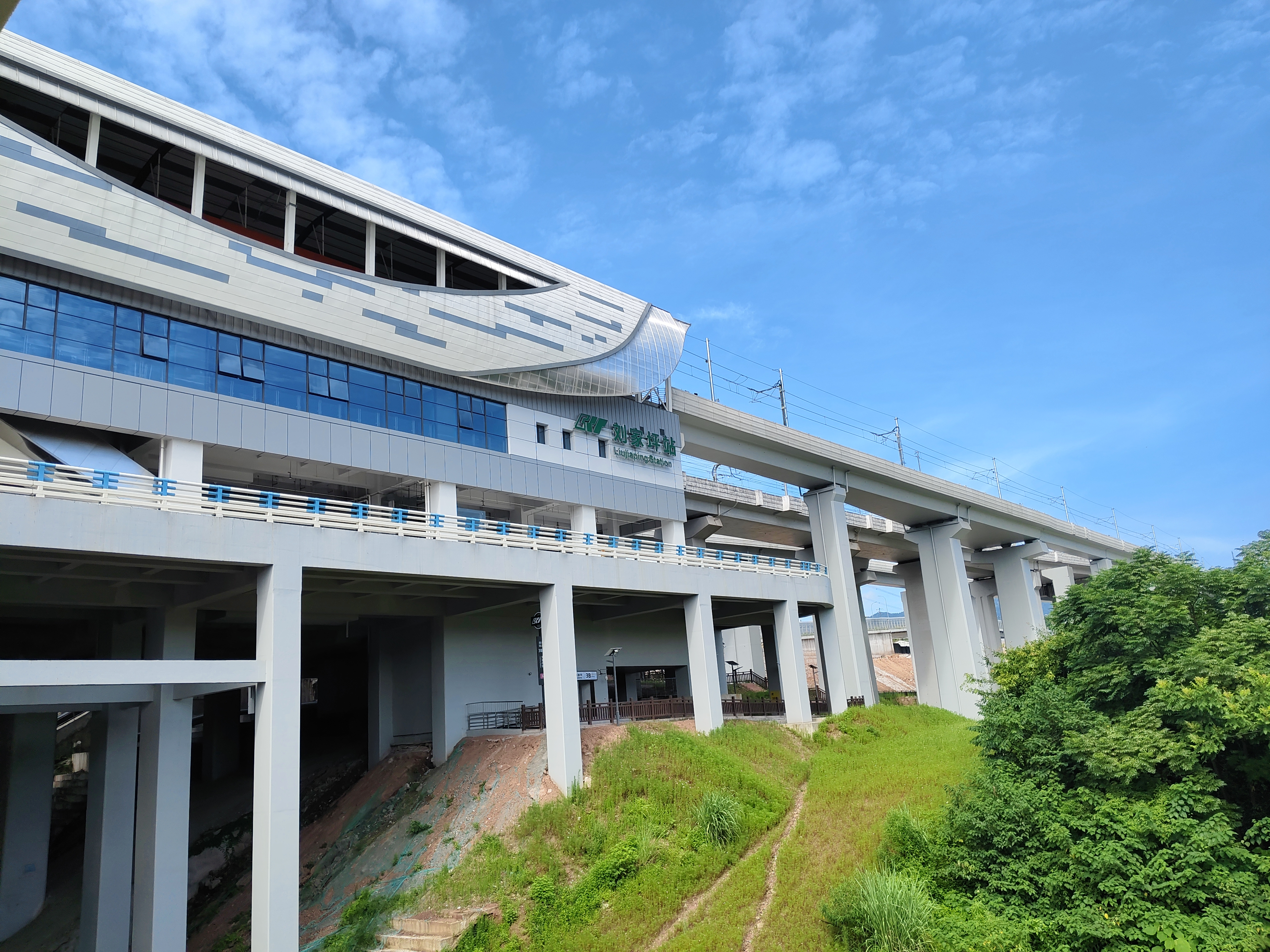
- Station building

Chinese name
- Simplified Chinese: 刘家坪站
- Traditional Chinese: 劉家坪站
Transcriptions
Standard Mandarin
- Hanyu Pinyin: Líujiāpíng Zhàn

General information
- Location: Chayuan Road (茶园路); Nan'an District, Chongqing; China
- Coordinates: 29°31′39.4″N 106°39′8.6″E
- System: Chongqing Rail Transit
- Operator: Chongqing Rail Transit Operation Co., Ltd.
- Line: Line 6
- Platforms: 4 (2 island platforms)
- Tracks: 4

Construction
- Structure type: Elevated
- Accessible: Yes

Other information
- Station code: /

History
- Opened: 30 December 2014; 11 years ago

Services
Preceding station	Chongqing Rail Transit	Following station
Changshengqiao towards Chayuan	Line 6	Shangxinjie towards Beibei
Baileyuan towards Chongqingdong Railway Station	Line 6 Chongqingdong branch	Terminus
Location

Liujiaping is a station on Line 6 of Chongqing Rail Transit in Chongqing municipality, China. It is located in Nan'an District. It opened in 2014.

== Station structure ==
F3		Line 6 to Chongqingdong Railway Station (Baileyuan)
F3	Island platform
F3		Line 6 to Chayuan (Changshengqiao)
F3		Line 6 termination track
F3	Island platform
F3		Line 6 to Beibei (Shangxinjie)
F2	Concourse	Customer service, Vending machines, Restrooms

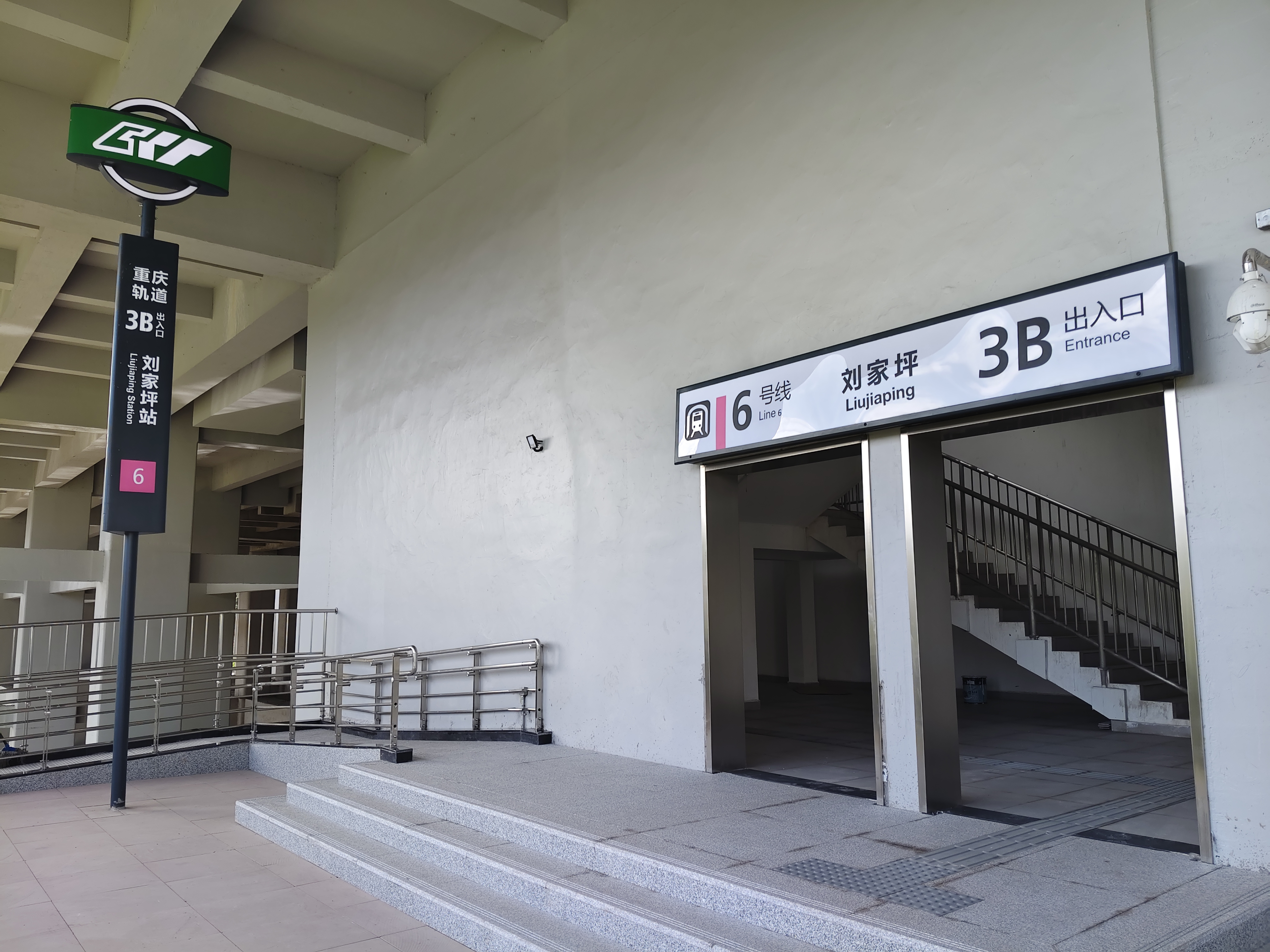
Entrance 3B

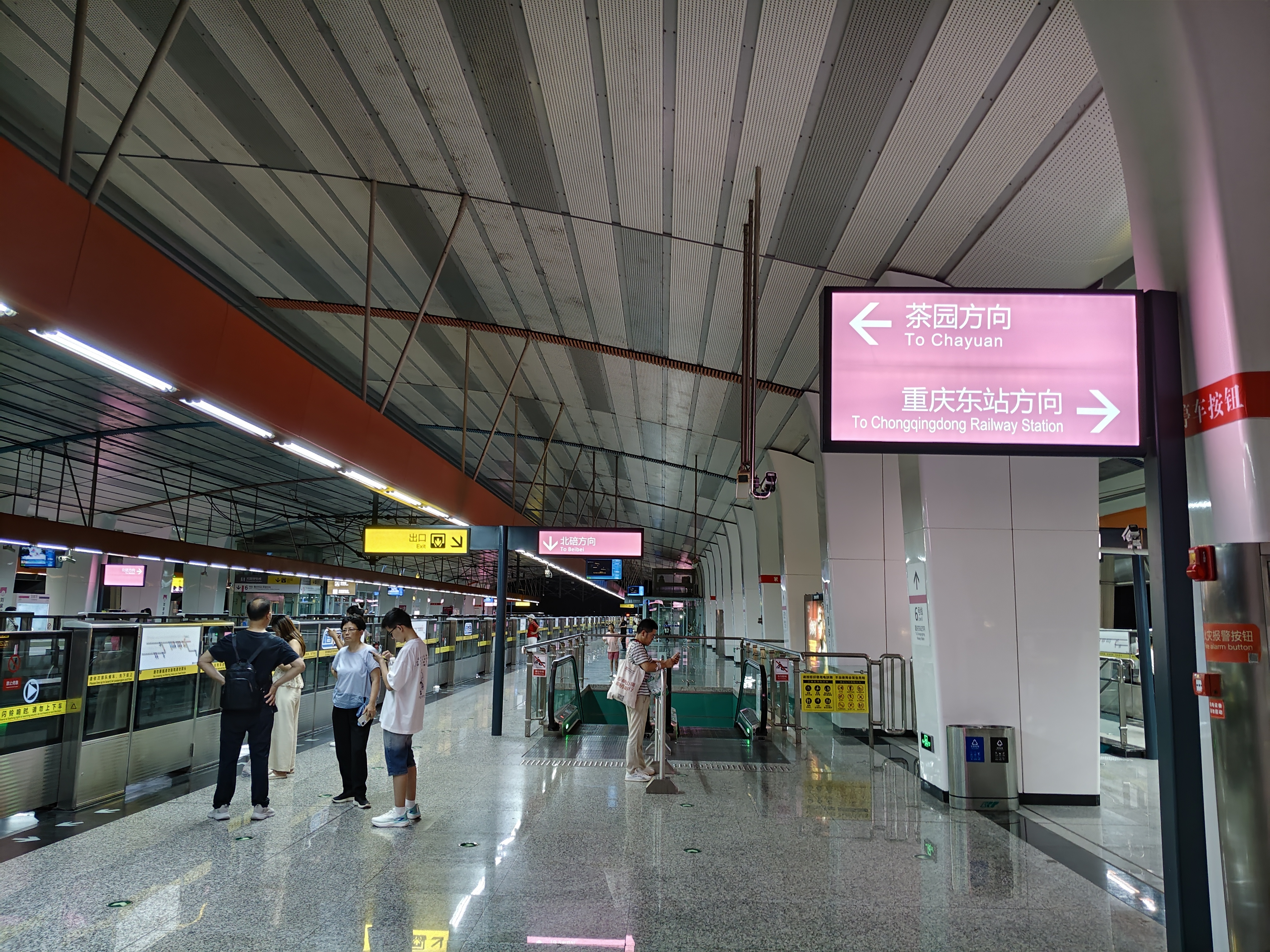
Platform towards Chayuan and Chongqingdong Railway Station
