= Dazhulin station =

Metro station in Chongqing, China

Dazhulin 大竹林
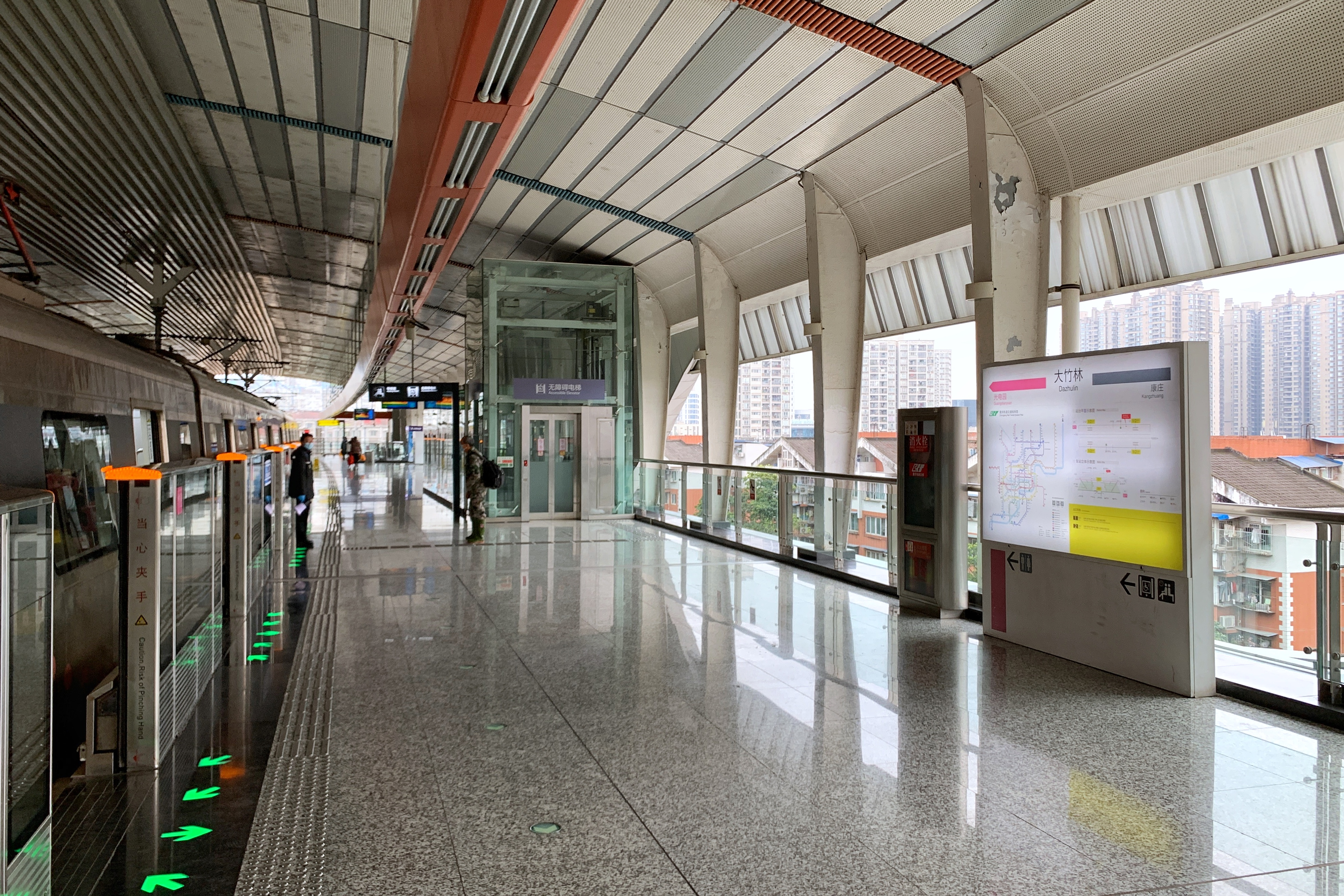

General information
- Location: Chongqing; China
- Coordinates: 29.63074°N 106.47437°E
- Operator: Chongqing Rail Transit Corp., Ltd
- Line: Line 6
- Platforms: 2 side platforms

Construction
- Structure type: Elevated

Other information
- Station code: 6/17

History
- Opened: 28 September 2012; 14 years ago

Services
| Preceding station | Chongqing Rail Transit | Following station |
|---|---|---|
| Guangdianyuan towards Chayuan | Line 6 | Kangzhuang towards Beibei |
Location

Dazhulin is a station on Line 6 of Chongqing Rail Transit in Chongqing Municipality, China.

== Location ==
Opened in 2012, It is located in Yubei District.

== Station structure ==
| 3F; Platforms | Side platform |
| 3F; Platforms | Line 6 to Beibei (Kangzhuang) |
| 3F; Platforms | Line 6 to Chayuan (Guangdianyuan) |
| 3F; Platforms | Side platform |
| 2F; Concourse | Exits, Customer service, Vending machines, Toilets |
