= Guangdianyuan station =

Metro station in Chongqing

Guangdianyuan 光电园
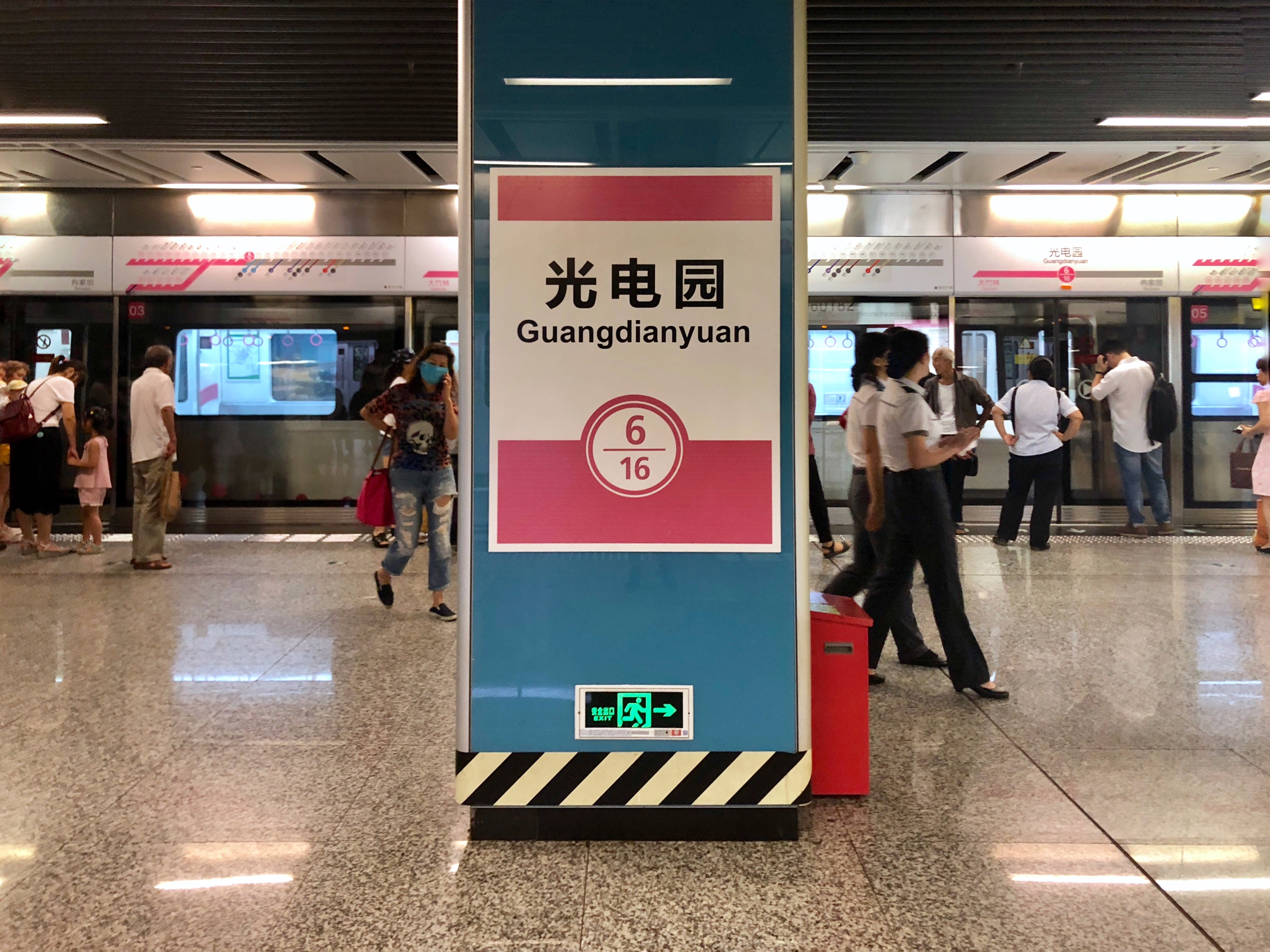

General information
- Location: Chongqing; China
- Operator: Chongqing Rail Transit Corp., Ltd
- Line: Line 6
- Platforms: 2 (1 island platform)

Construction
- Structure type: Underground

Other information
- Station code: 6/16

History
- Opened: 28 September 2012; 14 years ago

Services
Preceding station	Chongqing Rail Transit	Following station
Ranjiaba towards Chayuan	Line 6	Dazhulin towards Beibei
Location

Guangdianyuan is a station on Line 6 of Chongqing Rail Transit in Chongqing Municipality, China. It is located in Yubei District. It opened in 2012.

== Station structure ==
B2; Concourse	Exits, Customer service, Vending machines
B3; Platforms	Line 6 to Beibei (Dazhulin)
B3; Platforms	Island platform
B3; Platforms	Line 6 to Chayuan (Ranjiaba)
