= Shangxinjie station =

Chongqing Rail Transit station

Coordinates: 29.55896°N 106.59366°E

Shangxinjie 上新街
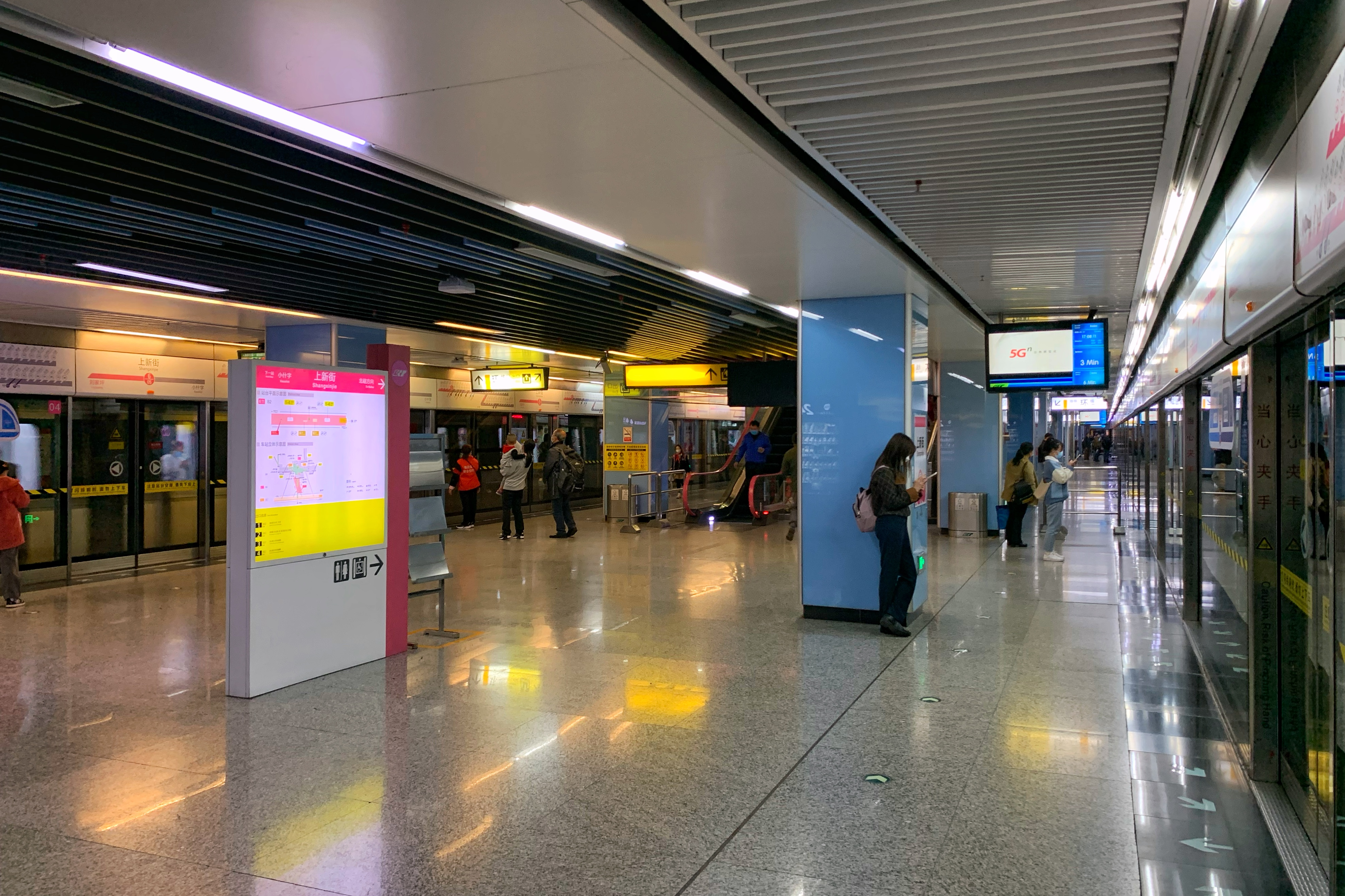
- Platform of line 6

General information
- Location: Tushan Road (涂山路) × Dongshuimen Bridge; Nan'an District, Chongqing; China
- Operated by: Chongqing Rail Transit Operation Co., Ltd.
- Lines: Loop line Line 6
- Platforms: 4 (2 island platforms)

Construction
- Structure type: Underground

Other information
- Station code: / /

History
- Opened: 30 December 2014; 11 years ago (Line 6); 28 December 2018; 7 years ago (Loop Line)

Services
Preceding station	Chongqing Rail Transit	Following station
Renji Counter-clockwise	Loop line	Shanghao Clockwise
Liujiaping towards Chayuan	Line 6	Xiaoshizi towards Beibei
Location

Shangxinjie Station is an interchange station on Line 6 and Loop Line of Chongqing Rail Transit in Chongqing municipality, China, which is located in Nan'an District. It opened in 2014.

== Station structure ==
B1	Concourse	Customer service, Vending machines
B2		Line 6 to Beibei (Xiaoshizi)
B2	Island platform
B2		Line 6 to Chayuan (Liujiaping)
B3		Loop line counterclockwise loop (Renji)
B3	Island platform
B3		Loop line clockwise loop (Shanghao)

=== Entrances/exits ===
- 1: Dongshuimen Bridge
- 2: Tushan Road
- 3: Tushan Road
- 4: Tushan Road
