= Line 15 (Chongqing Rail Transit) =

Metro line in Chongqing, China

- A Line 15 train leaving Jingkou station

Overview
- Native name: 重庆轨道交通15号线
- Status: In operation
- Locale: Chongqing, China
- Termini: Jingkou; Liangjiang Movie City
- Stations: 18 (in operation); 25 (total)

Service
- Type: Rapid transit
- System: Chongqing Rail Transit
- Operator(s): Chongqing Railway Group Co., Ltd.

History
- Opened: 12 November 2026; 3 days ago

Technical
- Line length: 47.9 km (29.8 miles) (in operation); 72 km (45 miles) (Total)
- Num of tracks: 2
- Track gauge: 1,435 mm (4 ft 8 1/2 in)
- Electrification: 25 kV AC 50 Hz Overhead catenary contact
- Operating speed: 140 km/h (87 mph) (Maximum design speed)

Line 15 of CRT is a rapid transit express line in Chongqing, China. It runs in an east–west direction in the north of the Chongqing metropolitan area, via the airport. Construction started in 2021. The first phase from Jingkou to Liangjiang Movie City opened on 12 November 2026.

Line 15 is the first express metro line in central Chongqing which can run up to 140 km/h and also the first Chongqing Rail Transit line to adopt GoA4 automation level.

== Stations (west to east) ==
=== Phases 1 and 2 ===
Phase 1 of Line 15 starts from Chongguang and ends at Liangjiang Movie City spanning 39 km (24 miles) with total of 14 stations. While phase 2 starts from Chongguang and ends at Zengjia spanning 33 km (21 miles) with total of 11 stations.

Station No.	Station name		Connections	Distance km		Location
Station No.	English	Chinese	Connections	Distance km		Location
	Zengjia	曾家		—	0.000	Shapingba
	Chongqing City Management College	重庆城市管理职业学院	17	2.870	2.870	Shapingba
	Chongqing University of Science and Technology	重庆科技大学	27	3.575	6.445	Shapingba
	Chenjiaqiao	陈家桥	Line 1	1.222	7.667	Shapingba
	Chongqing Polytechnic University of Electronic Technology	重庆电子科技职业大学		1.766	9.433	Shapingba
	Zhangjiawan	张家湾		2.523	11.956	Shapingba
	Wuyunxincheng	五云新城	7	3.099	15.055	Shapingba
	Jingkou	井口		8.942	23.997	Shapingba
	Lixuelu	礼学路		2.769	26.766	Yubei
	Jinshansi	金山寺	Line 6	1.786	28.552	Yubei
	Happy Valley	欢乐谷	Line 6	2.052	30.604	Yubei
	Chongguanglijiao	重光立交		2.853	33.457	Yubei
	Chongguang	重光	Line 5	1.121	34.578	Yubei
	Jinfulu	金福路		2.088	36.666	Yubei
	Jintonglu	金童路	Line 3	1.855	38.521	Yubei
	Guotanglu	果塘路		1.896	40.417	Yubei
	Southwest University of Political Science and Law	西南政法大学		2.324	42.741	Yubei
	Baoshenghu	宝圣湖	Line 9	1.816	44.557	Yubei
	Shuanglonghu	双龙湖		3.593	48.150	Yubei
	Terminal 3 of Jiangbei Airport	江北机场T3航站楼	Line 10 CKG	3.281	51.431	Yubei
	Tianbao	天堡		10.450	61.881	Yubei
	Longgangdadao	龙港大道		2.144	64.025	Yubei
	Fusheng	复盛	Line 4 Fusheng	3.338	67.363	Jiangbei
	Fuhuidadao	福惠大道		2.213	69.576	Jiangbei
	Liangjiang Movie City	两江影视城		2.285	71.861	Yubei
