= Happy Valley station (Chongqing Rail Transit) =

Chongqing Rail Transit station

Happy Valley 欢乐谷
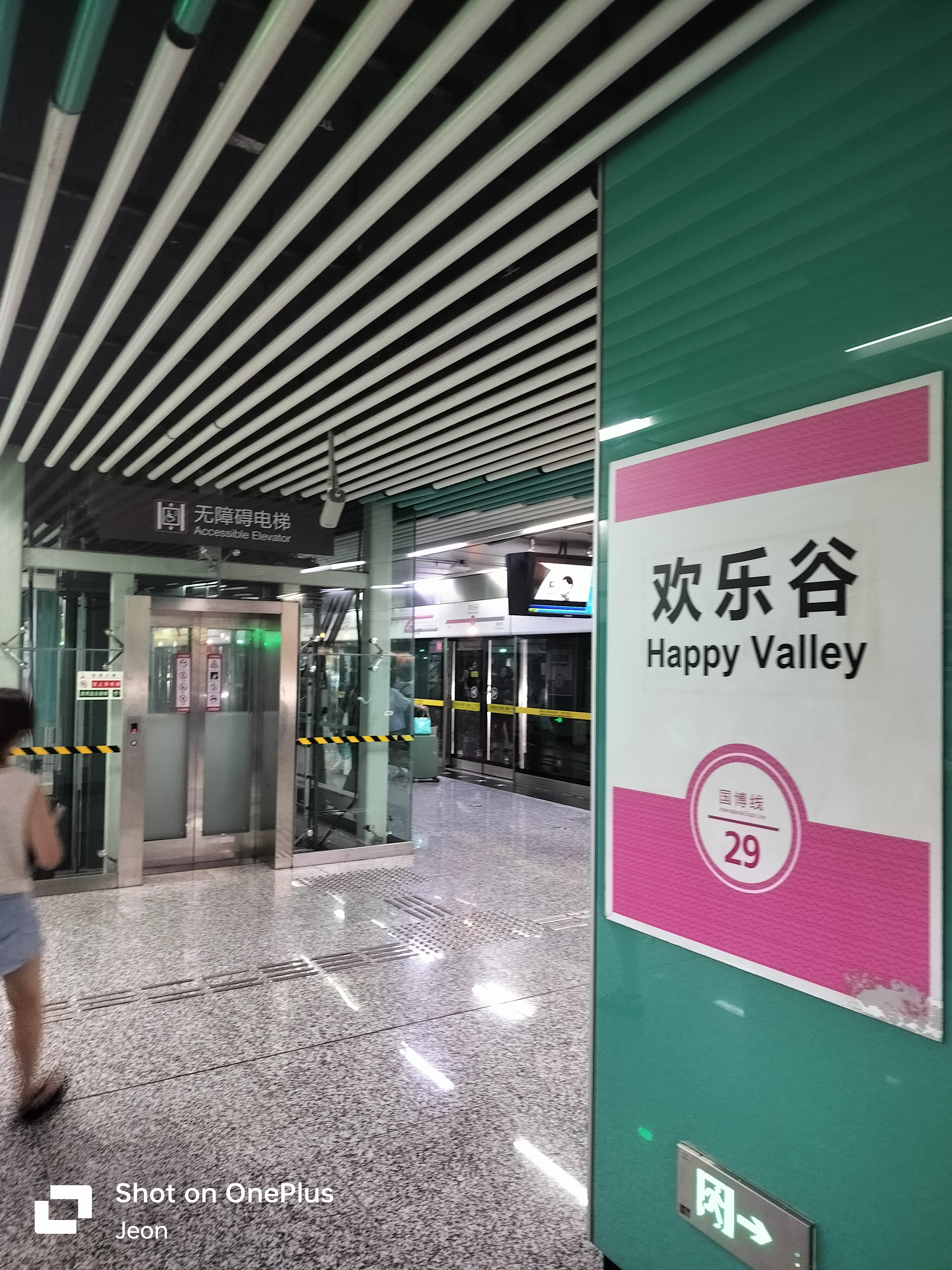

General information
- Location: Chongqing; China
- Coordinates: 29.6716°N 106.5047°E
- Operator: Chongqing Rail Transit Corp., Ltd
- Line: Line 6 (International Expo Branch)
- Platforms: 2 (1 island platform)

Construction
- Structure type: Underground

Other information
- Station code: 6/29

History
- Opened: 28 February 2015; 11 years ago

Services
Preceding station	Chongqing Rail Transit	Following station
Lijia Terminus	Line 6 International Expo branch	Huangmaoping towards Shaheba
Location

Happy Valley station (Chinese: 欢乐谷站; pinyin: Huānlègǔ zhàn), formerly known as Pingchang station (Chinese: 平场站; pinyin: Píngchǎng zhàn), is a station on International Expo branch of Line 6 of Chongqing Rail Transit in Chongqing municipality, China, which opened as an infill station in 2015. It is located in Yubei District.
