= Line 24 (Chongqing Rail Transit) =

Metro line in Chongqing, China

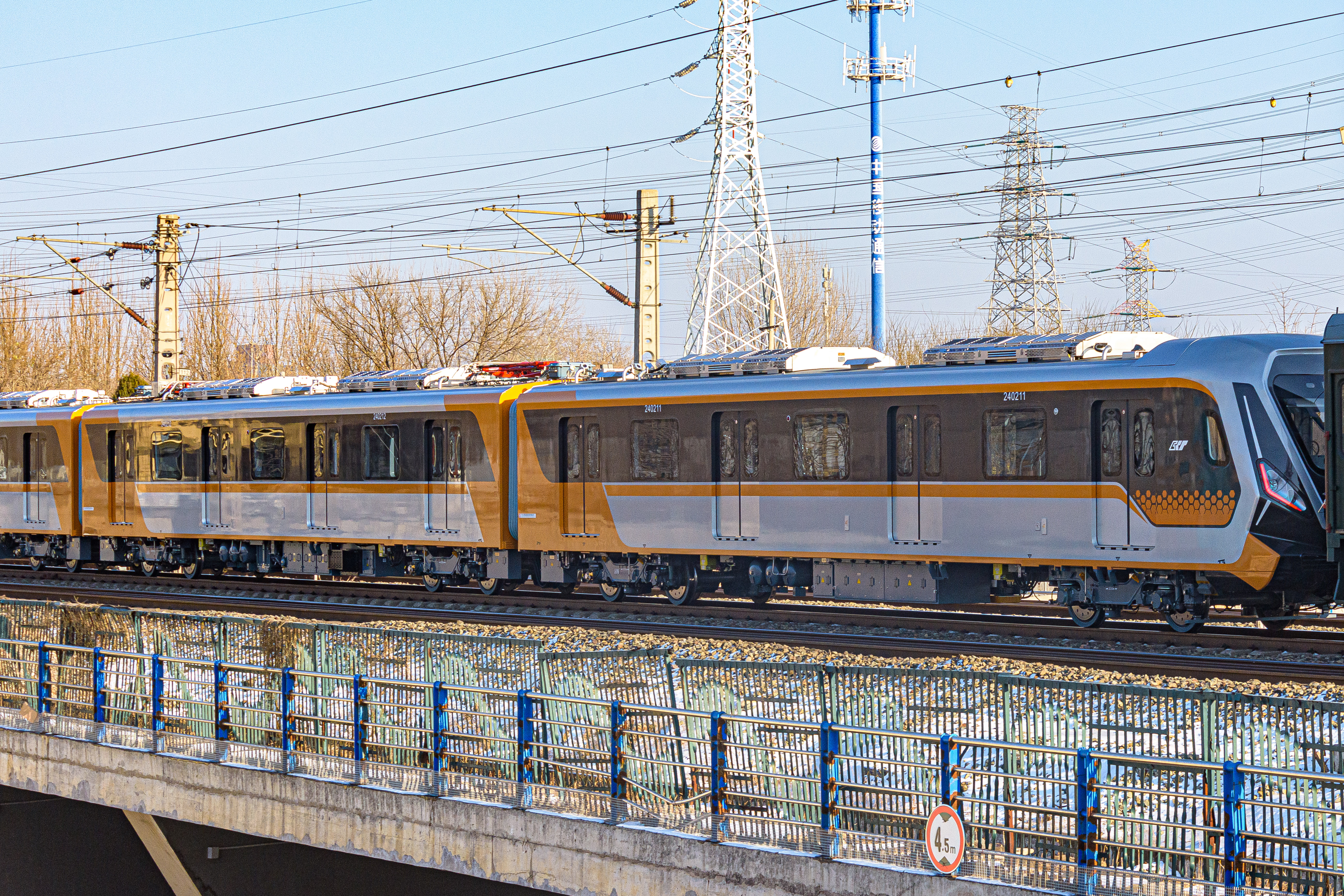
- Train of Line 24

Overview
- Native name: 重庆轨道交通24号线
- Status: Under construction
- Locale: Chongqing, China
- Termini: Lujiaobei; Guangyangwan
- Stations: 11

Service
- Type: Rapid transit
- System: Chongqing Rail Transit
- Operator(s): Chongqing Railway Group Co., Ltd.

Technical
- Line length: 18.34 km (11.40 mi)
- Track length: 18.55 km (11.53 mi)
- Num of tracks: 2
- Track gauge: 1,435 mm (4 ft 8 1/2 in)

Line 24 of CRT is a rapid transit line in Chongqing, China. It will run in an east–west direction in the north of Chongqing metropolitan area, while the first phase is located in the east suburban area only. The construction started in 2021.

== Stations (west to east) ==
=== Phases 1 ===
| Station No. | Station name | | Connections | Distance km | | Location |
| Station No. | English | Chinese | Connections | Distance km | | Location |
|---|---|---|---|---|---|---|
| | Lujiaobei | 鹿角北 | | — | 0.000 | Banan |
| | Kuangjiatang | 况家塘 | | 1.051 | 1.051 | Banan |
| | Zhuyuancun | 竹园村 | | 2.094 | 3.145 | Nanan |
| | Chongqingdong Railway Station | 重庆东站 | Line 6 27 | 2.690 | 5.835 | Nanan |
| | Dilongwan | 地龙湾 | | 1.371 | 7.206 | Nanan |
| | Waziba | 瓦子坝 | | 1.256 | 8.462 | Nanan |
| | Chafulu | 茶涪路 | | 2.501 | 10.963 | Nanan |
| | Shangmaocheng | 商贸城 | | 2.098 | 13.061 | Nanan |
| | Yinglong | 迎龙 | | 1.047 | 14.108 | Nanan |
| | Shangmaochengbei | 商贸城北 | | 1.321 | 15.428 | Nanan |
| | Guangyangwan | 广阳湾 | | 2.909 | 18.337 | Nanan |
