= Line 27 (Chongqing Rail Transit) =

Metro line in Chongqing, China

Overview
- Termini: Bishan; Huimin
- Stations: 15

Service
- Type: Rapid transit
- System: Chongqing Rail Transit
- Operator(s): Chongqing Rail Transit Corporation Limited

Technical
- Line length: 56 km (35 mi) (Bishan to Huimin)
- Electrification: 25kV AC
- Operating speed: 140 km/h (87 mph)

Line 27 of Chongqing Rail Transit is a rapid transit line in Chongqing, China.

Line 27 (Bishan to Huimin section) will be 56 kilometres (35 mi) long, all stations except Bishan will be located underground. Trains will run at a maximum speed of 140 kilometres per hour (87 mph). Line 27 trains will through operate with the Bitong Line and continue to Tongliangxi in Tongliang District. The line will feature passing loops for express services.

== History ==
Construction started in February 2022.

Construction of the Yangtze River Tunnel of Line 27 (about 800 meters long) started in May 2024.

== Stations ==
| Line name | Station No. | Station name | | Connections | Location |
| Line name | Station No. | English | Chinese | Connections | Location |
|---|---|---|---|---|---|
| Bitong line | | Tongliangxi | 铜梁西 | | Tongliang |
| Bitong line | | Tongliang Longcheng Paradise Walk | 铜梁龙城天街 | | Tongliang |
| Bitong line | | Sci-Tech Innovation Center | 科创新城 | | Tongliang |
| Bitong line | | Qinglong | 庆隆 | | Tongliang |
| Bitong line | | Dalu | 大路 | | Bishan |
| Bitong line | | Qinglonghu (under construction) | 青龙湖 | | Bishan |
| Bitong line | | Hebian | 河边 | | Bishan |
| Bitong line | | Bicheng | 璧城 | | Bishan |
| Bitong line / Line 27 | | Bishan | 璧山 | Line 1 Bishan SkyShuttle (Note: Out of system transfer) | Bishan |
| Line 27 | | Huxi | 虎溪 | 17 | Shapingba |
| Line 27 | | Chongqing University of Science and Technology | 重庆科技大学 | 15 | Shapingba |
| Line 27 | | Zhaishanping | 寨山坪 | | Shapingba |
| Line 27 | | Xiyong | 西永 | 7 | Shapingba |
| Line 27 | | Ciqikou | 磁器口 | Line 1 | Shapingba |
| Line 27 | | Shapingba | 沙坪坝 | Line 1 Line 9 Loop line CYW | Shapingba |
| Line 27 | | Shiqiaopu | 石桥铺 | Line 1 Line 5 | Jiulongpo |
| Line 27 | | Chongqing Medical University | 重医 | | Yuzhong |
| Line 27 | | Chongqing Station | 重庆站 | 18 CQW | Yuzhong |
| Line 27 | | Nanbinlu | 南滨路 | | Nan'an |
| Line 27 | | Nanping | 南坪 | Line 3 10 | Nan'an |
| Line 27 | | Guangfu Ave. | 广福大道 | | Nan'an |
| Line 27 | | Chongqingdong Railway Station | 重庆东站 | 6 24 Chongqingdong | Nan'an |
| Line 27 East ext. | | Huimin | 惠民 | | Nan'an |
