= Line 6 (Chongqing Rail Transit) =

Metro line of Chongqing Rail Transit

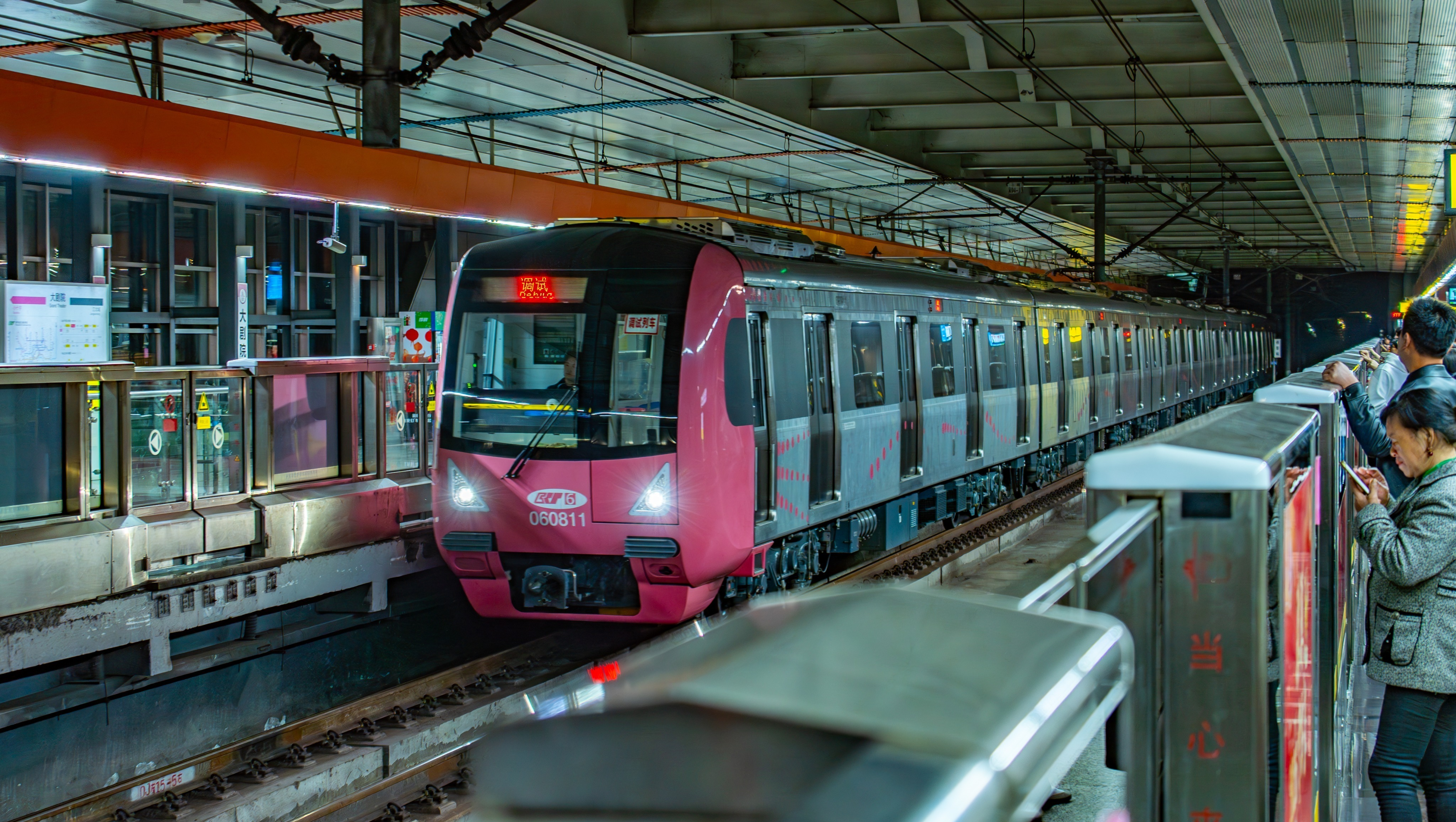
- A train of Line 6 at Grand Theater station

Overview
- Status: operational
- Termini: Chayuan/Chongqingdong Railway Station (Main line) Lijia (International Expo branch); Beibei (Main line) Shaheba (International Expo branch)
- Stations: 43: 31 (main line); 12 (International Expo branch)

Service
- Type: Rapid transit
- System: Chongqing Rail Transit
- Operator(s): Chongqing Rail Transit Corp., Ltd
- Daily ridership: 452,300 (2016 Peak)

History
- Opened: 28 September 2012; 14 years ago

Technical
- Line length: 92.122 km (57.242 mi)
- Track gauge: 1435 mm
- Operating speed: 100 km/h (peak)

CRT Line 6 (and the branch line branded as International Expo line) is the second heavy rail subway line in Chongqing, as well as being the longest rapid transit line in China, at 85.6 km (53.19 mi) long. It opened with provisional revenue service on September 28, 2012, and connects Nan'an, Yuzhong, and Jiangbei districts in central Chongqing.

The eastern extension of line 6 convers a distance of 6.79 km, this extension starts from Liujiaping and branches off towards Chongqingdong Railway Station, with 2 stations in between. The project began on 28 March 2022. It is opened on 27 June 2025.

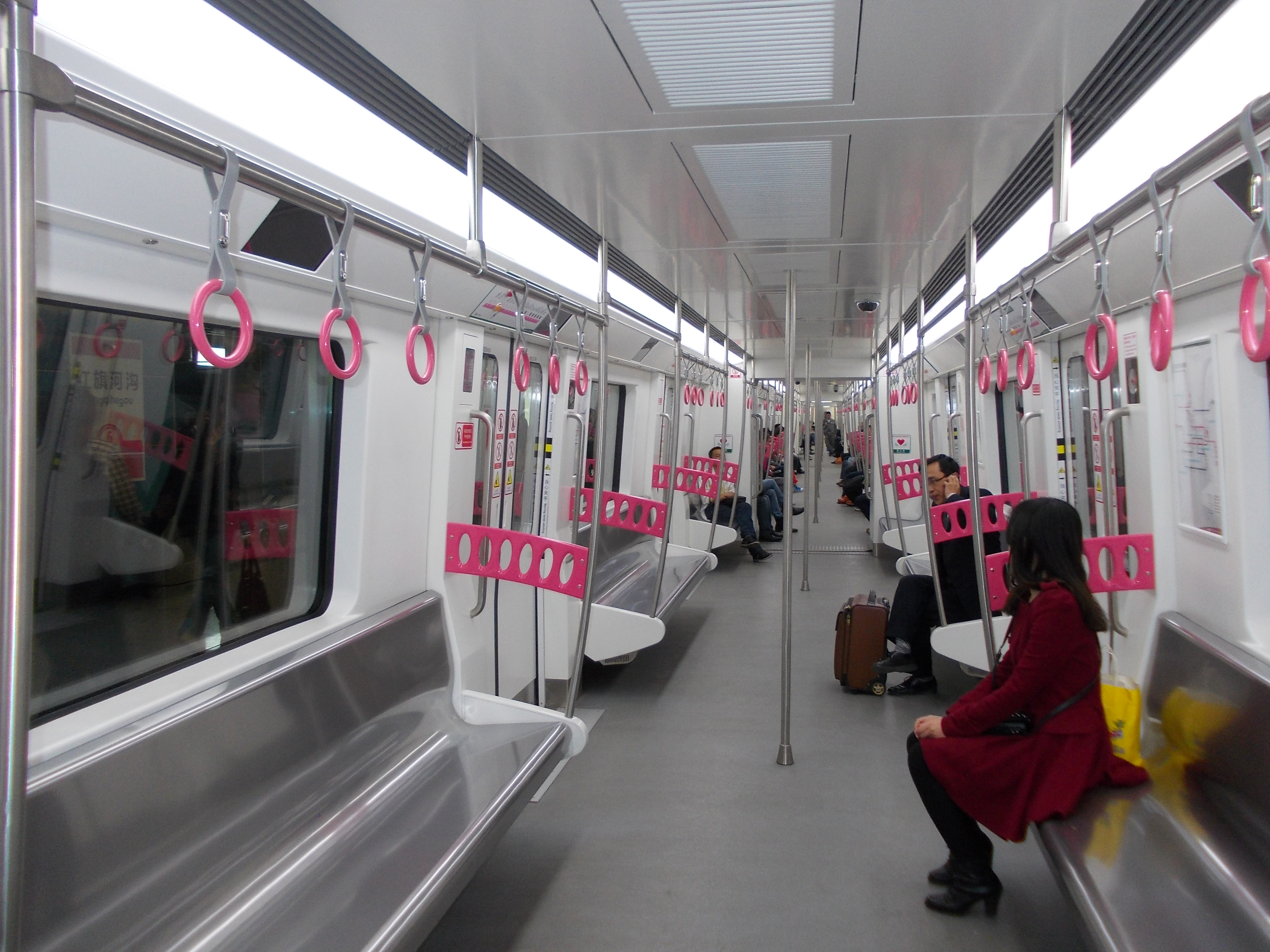
Interior of a Line 6 train

== Opening timeline ==
| Segment | Commencement | Length | Station(s) | Name |
|---|---|---|---|---|
| Wulidian – Kangzhuang | 28 September 2012 | 13.91 km (8.64 mi) | 9 | Phase 1 (initial section) |
| Kangzhuang – Lijia | 26 December 2012 | 3.9 km (2.42 mi) | 1 | Phase 1 (2nd section) |
| Ranjiaba | 20 January 2013 | Infill station | 1 | |
| Lijia – Yuelai | 15 May 2013 | 12.1 km (7.52 mi) | 2 | International Expo line Phase 1 |
| Lijia – Beibei | 31 December 2013 | 23.4 km (14.54 mi) | 4 | Phase 2 (northern section) |
| Jiuquhe, Tiansheng (Note: Currently named as Southwest University.) | 28 September 2014 | Infill stations | 2 | |
| Xiangjiagang | 26 November 2014 | Infill station | 1 | |
| Chayuan – Wulidian | 30 December 2014 | 19.2 km (11.93 mi) | 7 | Phase 1 (final section) & Phase 2 (southern section) |
| Pingchang (Note: Currently named as Happy Valley.), Huangmaoping | 28 February 2015 | Infill stations | 2 | |
| Caojiawan, Gaoyikou | 26 October 2015 | Infill stations | 2 | |
| Jiangbeicheng | 28 January 2016 | Infill station | 1 | |
| Yuelai – Shaheba | 31 December 2020 | 13.99 km (8.69 mi) | 7 | International Expo line Phase 2 |
| Liujiaping – Chongqingdong Railway Station | 27 June 2025 | 6.79 km (4.22 mi) | 3 | Eastern extension |

== Map ==
Outdated, without the second branch from Chongqingdong Railway Station to Liujiaping.

Route of Line 6

== Stations ==
| Service routes | | | | Station No. | Station name | | Connections | Distance km | | Location |
| Service routes | | | | Station No. | English | Chinese | Connections | Distance km | | Location |
|---|---|---|---|---|---|---|---|---|---|---|
| ● | | | | / | Chongqingdong Railway Station | 重庆东站 | 24 27; Chongqingdong | – | 0.000 | Nan'an |
| ● | | | | / | Taohuaqiao | 桃花桥 | | 3.131 | 3.131 | Nan'an |
| ● | | | | / | Baileyuan | 百乐园 | | 1.325 | 4.456 | Nan'an |
| | ● | ● | | / | Chayuan | 茶园 | | – | 0.000 | Nan'an |
| | ● | ● | | / | Qiujiawan | 邱家湾 | | 1.318 | 1.318 | Nan'an |
| | ● | ● | | / | Changshengqiao | 长生桥 | | 1.670 | 2.988 | Nan'an |
| ● | ● | ● | | / | Liujiaping | 刘家坪 | | 1.845 | 4.833 | Nan'an |
| ● | ● | ● | | / | Liujiaping | 刘家坪 | | 1.689 | 6.145 | Nan'an |
| | ● | ● | | / | Shangxinjie | 上新街 | Loop line | 6.701 | 11.534 | Nan'an |
| | ● | ● | | / | Xiaoshizi | 小什字 | Line 1 18 | 1.393 | 12.927 | Yuzhong |
| | ● | ● | | / | Grand Theater | 大剧院 | | 1.216 | 14.143 | Liangjiang |
| | ● | ● | | / | Jiangbeicheng | 江北城 | Line 9 | 0.961 | 15.104 | Liangjiang |
| | ● | ● | | / | Wulidian | 五里店 | Line 9 Loop line | 1.427 | 16.531 | Liangjiang |
| | ● | ● | | / | Hongtudi | 红土地 | Line 10 | 1.411 | 17.942 | Liangjiang |
| | ● | ● | | / | Huangnibang | 黄泥磅 | | 1.380 | 19.322 | Liangjiang |
| | ● | ● | | / | Hongqihegou | 红旗河沟 | Line 3 | 1.215 | 20.537 | Liangjiang |
| | ● | ● | | / | Huahuiyuan | 花卉园 | 4 | 1.326 | 21.863 | Liangjiang |
| | ● | ● | | / | Dalongshan | 大龙山 | Line 5 | 1.843 | 23.706 | Liangjiang |
| | ● | ● | | / | Ranjiaba | 冉家坝 | Line 5 Loop line | 1.006 | 24.712 | Liangjiang |
| | ● | ● | | / | Guangdianyuan | 光电园 | | 1.929 | 26.641 | Liangjiang |
| | ● | ● | | / | Dazhulin | 大竹林 | | 3.120 | 29.761 | Liangjiang |
| | ● | ● | | / | Kangzhuang | 康庄 | | 0.756 | 30.517 | Liangjiang |
| | ● | ● | | / | Jiuquhe | 九曲河 | | 2.160 | 32.677 | Liangjiang |
| | ● | ● | ● | / | Lijia | 礼嘉 | | 1.606 | 34.283 | Liangjiang |
| | ● | ● | | / | Jinshansi | 金山寺 | 15 | 1.503 | 35.786 | Liangjiang |
| | ● | ● | | / | Caojiawan | 曹家湾 | | 5.145 | 40.931 | Liangjiang |
| | ● | ● | | / | Caijia | 蔡家 | | 2.004 | 42.935 | Liangjiang |
| | | ● | | / | Xiangjiagang | 向家岗 | | 1.890 | 44.825 | Liangjiang |
| | | ● | | / | Longfengxi | 龙凤溪 | | 8.779 | 53.604 | Beibei |
| | | ● | | / | Zhuangyuanbei | 状元碑 | | 1.801 | 55.405 | Beibei |
| | | ● | | / | Southwest University | 西南大学 | | 2.977 | 58.382 | Beibei |
| | | ● | | / | Beibei | 北碚 | | 1.781 | 60.163 | Beibei |
International Expo branch
| | | | ● | / | Happy Valley | 欢乐谷 | 15 | 2.378 | 36.661 | Liangjiang |
| | | | ● | / | Huangmaoping | 黄茅坪 | | 2.800 | 39.461 | Liangjiang |
| | | | ● | / | Gaoyikou | 高义口 | | 3.438 | 42.899 | Liangjiang |
| | | | ● | / | International Expo Center | 国博中心 | | 2.321 | 45.22 | Liangjiang |
| | | | ● | / | Yuelai | 悦来 | Line 10 | 1.075 | 46.295 | Liangjiang |
| | | | ● | / | Wangjiazhuang | 王家庄 | Line 10 | 2.023 | 48.318 | Liangjiang |
| | | | ● | / | Qingxihe | 清溪河 | | 2.308 | 50.626 | Liangjiang |
| | | | ● | / | Liujiayuanzi | 刘家院子 | | 2.120 | 52.746 | Liangjiang |
| | | | ● | / | Siyuan | 思源 | | 2.921 | 55.667 | Liangjiang |
| | | | ● | / | Fuxing | 复兴 | | 1.704 | 57.371 | Liangjiang |
| | | | ● | / | Hongyanping | 红岩坪 | | 1.235 | 58.606 | Liangjiang |
| | | | ● | / | Shaheba | 沙河坝 | | 1.491 | 60.097 | Liangjiang |

== Features ==
=== Caijia Rail Transit Bridge ===
The line crosses the Jialing River via Caijia Rail Transit Bridge (Chinese: 蔡家轨道大桥). Construction work began in October 2010 and it was completed in December 2013.
