= Beibei station =

Chongqing Rail Transit station

Beibei 北碚
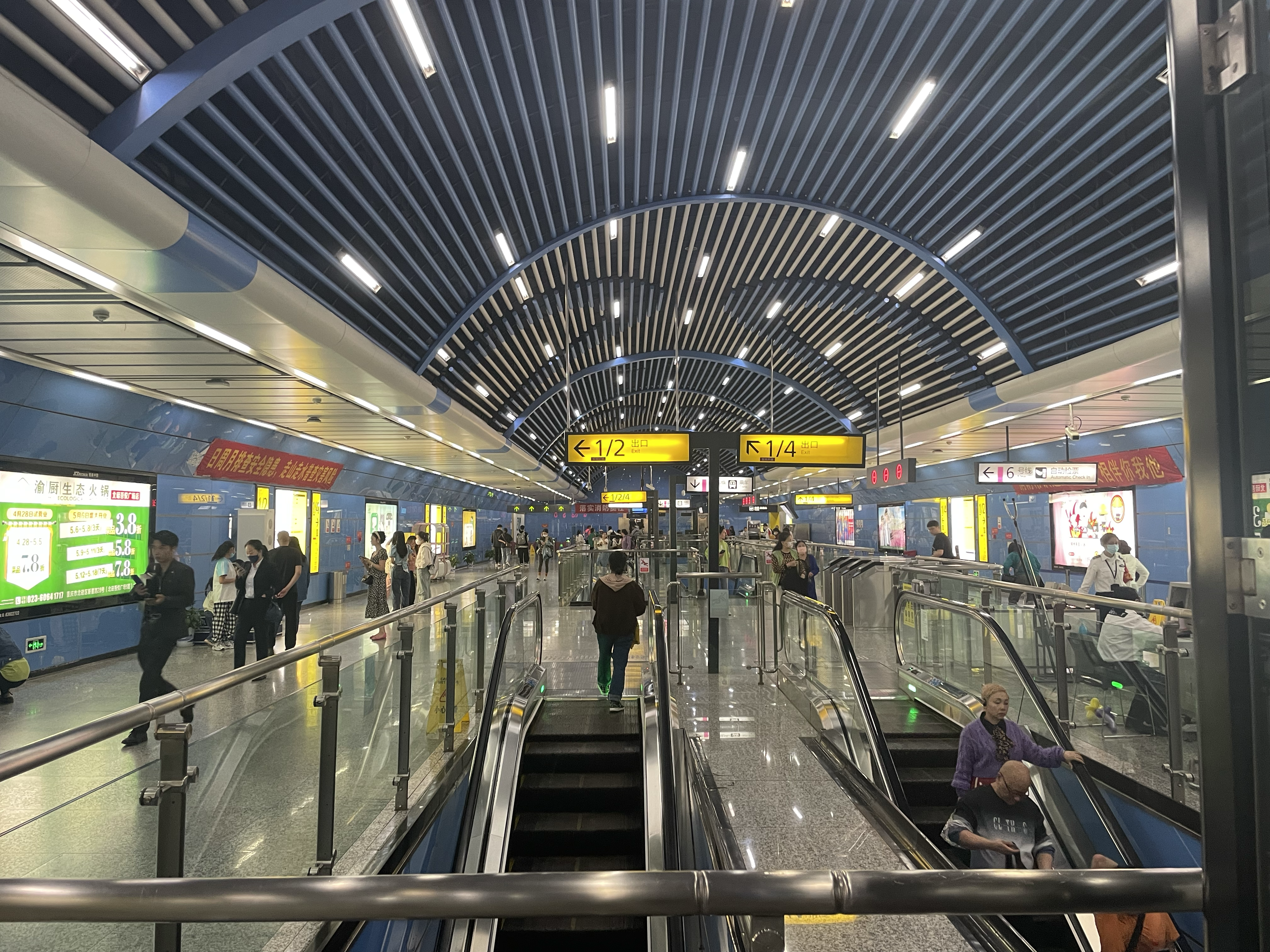

Chinese name
- Chinese: 北碚
- Hanyu Pinyin: Běibèi
Transcriptions
Standard Mandarin
- Hanyu Pinyin: Běibèi
- Wade–Giles: Pei^{3}-pei^{4}
- IPA: [pèɪ.pêɪ]
Yue: Cantonese
- Yale Romanization: Bākbui
- Jyutping: bak1 bui3
- IPA: [pɐk̚˥.puj˧]

General information
- Location: Chongqing; China
- Coordinates: 29.82778°N 106.43333°E
- Operated by: Chongqing Rail Transit Corp., Ltd
- Line: Line 6
- Platforms: 2 (1 island platform)

Construction
- Structure type: Underground

Other information
- Station code: /

History
- Opened: 31 December 2013; 12 years ago

Services
Preceding station	Chongqing Rail Transit	Following station
Southwest University towards Chayuan	Line 6	Terminus
Location

Beibei Station is a station on Line 6 of Chongqing Rail Transit in Chongqing municipality, China, which is the northwestern terminus of Line 6. It is located in Beibei District and opened in 2013.

== Station structure ==
B1; Concourse	Exits, Customer service, Vending machines
B2; Platforms	Line 6 to Chayuan (Southwest University)
B2; Platforms	Island platform
B2; Platforms	Line 6 termination platform
