= Lijia station =

Metro station in Chongqing, China

Lijia 礼嘉
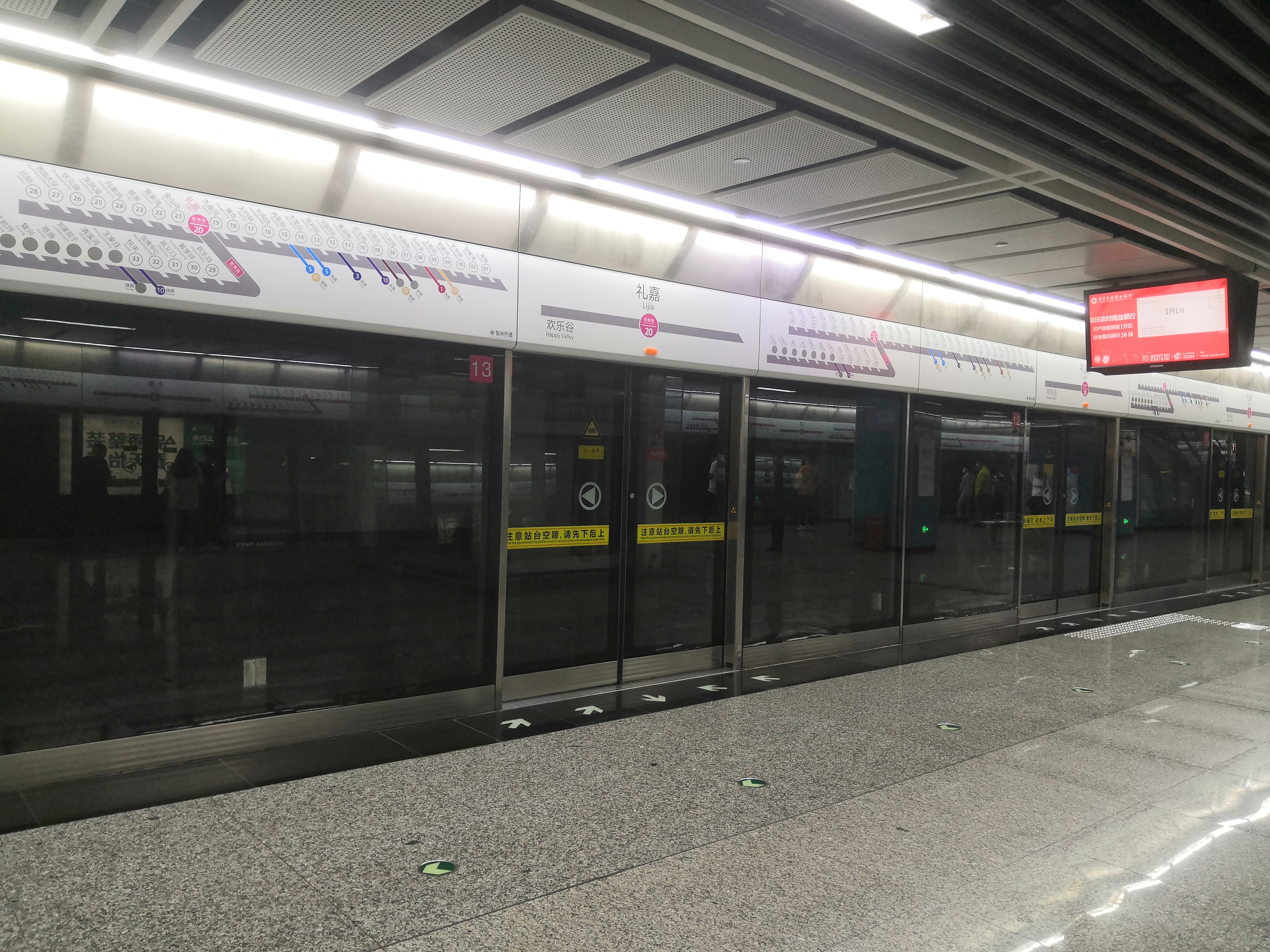
- Platform of Line 6 International Expo branch

General information
- Location: Chongqing; China
- Coordinates: 29.66982°N 106.48408°E
- Operator: Chongqing Rail Transit Corp., Ltd
- Line: Line 6
- Platforms: 4 (2 island platforms)

Construction
- Structure type: Underground

Other information
- Station code: /

History
- Opened: 26 December 2012; 13 years ago (Main line); 15 May 2013; 13 years ago (International Expo branch)

Services
Preceding station	Chongqing Rail Transit	Following station
Jiuquhe towards Chayuan	Line 6	Jinshansi towards Beibei
Terminus	Line 6 International Expo branch	Happy Valley towards Shaheba
Location

Lijia is a station on Line 6 of Chongqing Rail Transit in Chongqing Municipality, China, which opened in 2012. It is located in Yubei District. The station also serves as the southern terminus of the International Expo branch of Line 6.

== Station structure ==
A cross-platform interchange is provided between Line 6 main line and International Expo branch.

B1; Concourse	Exits, Customer service, Vending machines
B2; Platforms	Line 6 to Chayuan (Jiuquhe)
B2; Platforms	Island platform
B2; Platforms	Line 6 – International Expo branch termination platform
B2; Platforms	Line 6 – International Expo branch to Shaheba (Happy Valley)
B2; Platforms	Island platform
B2; Platforms	Line 6 to Beibei (Jinshansi)
