= Luojiaba station =

Metro station in Chongqing, China

Luojiaba 罗家坝
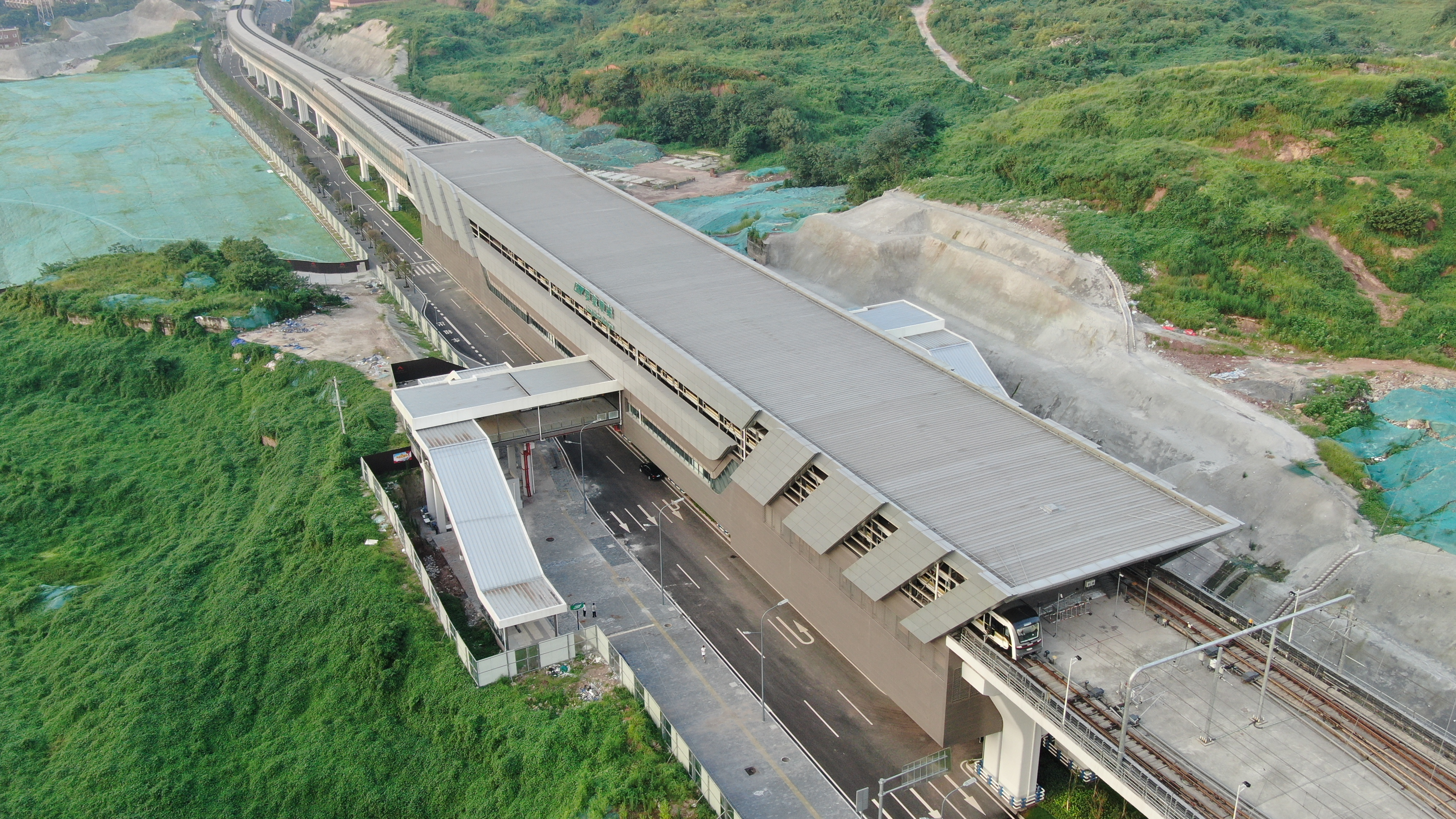
- Aerial view of the station

General information
- Location: Chongqing; China
- Operated by: Chongqing Rail Transit Corp., Ltd
- Line: Loop line
- Platforms: 2 (1 island platform)

Construction
- Structure type: Elevated
- Accessible: 3 accessible elevators (1 under construction)

Other information
- Station code: 0/24

History
- Opened: 1 July 2019; 6 years ago

Services
Preceding station	Chongqing Rail Transit	Following station
Haitangxi Counter-clockwise	Loop line	Sigongli Clockwise
Location

Luojiaba station (Chinese: 罗家坝站; pinyin: Luójiābà zhàn) is a metro station on the Loop Line of Chongqing Rail Transit in Nan'an District of Chongqing Municipality, China.

It serves the area surrounding Yusheng Road, including a nearby hospital and 2 nearby schools.

The station opened on 1 July 2019.

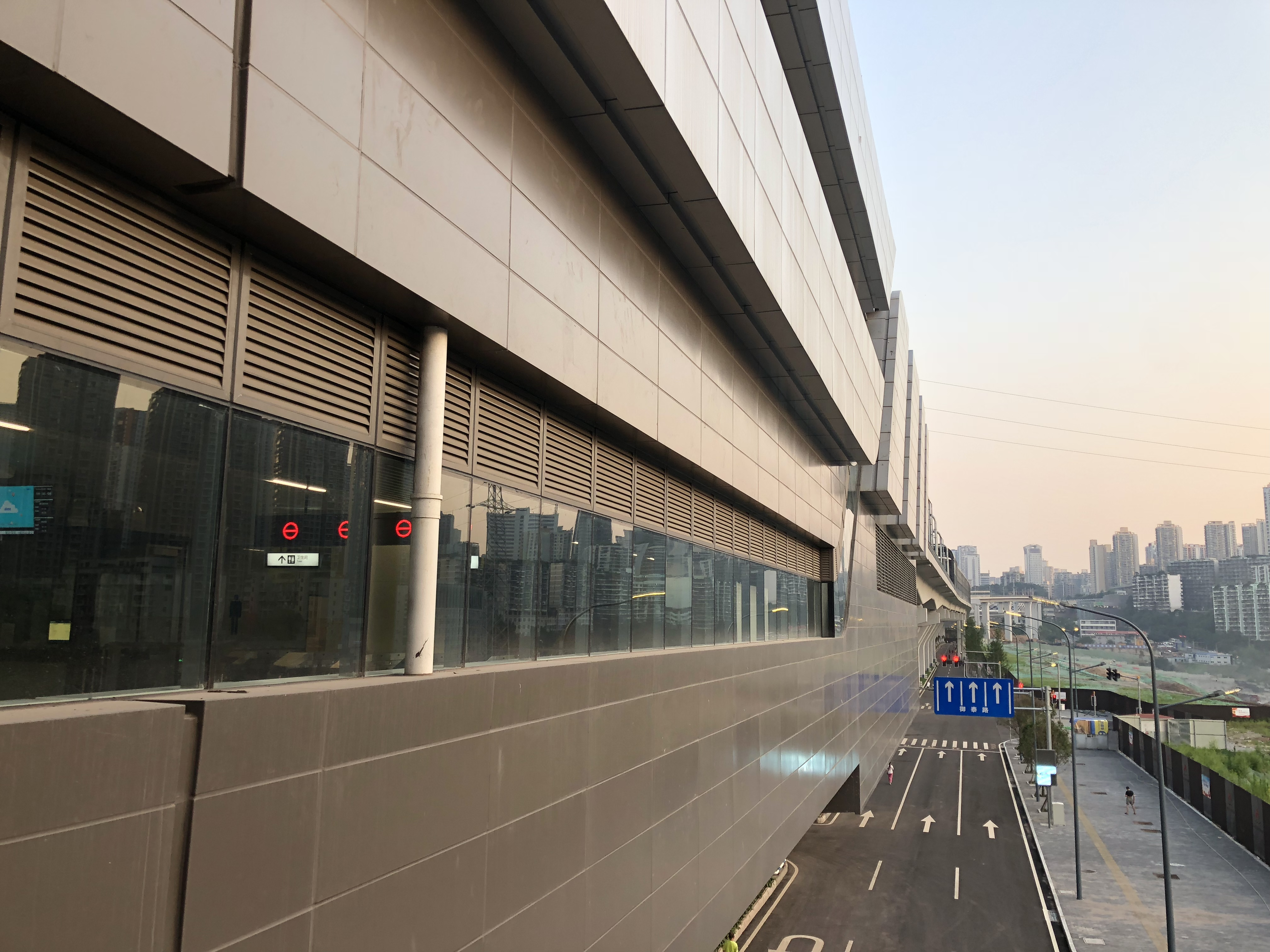
Exterior design of the station, with Sigongli station in the distance

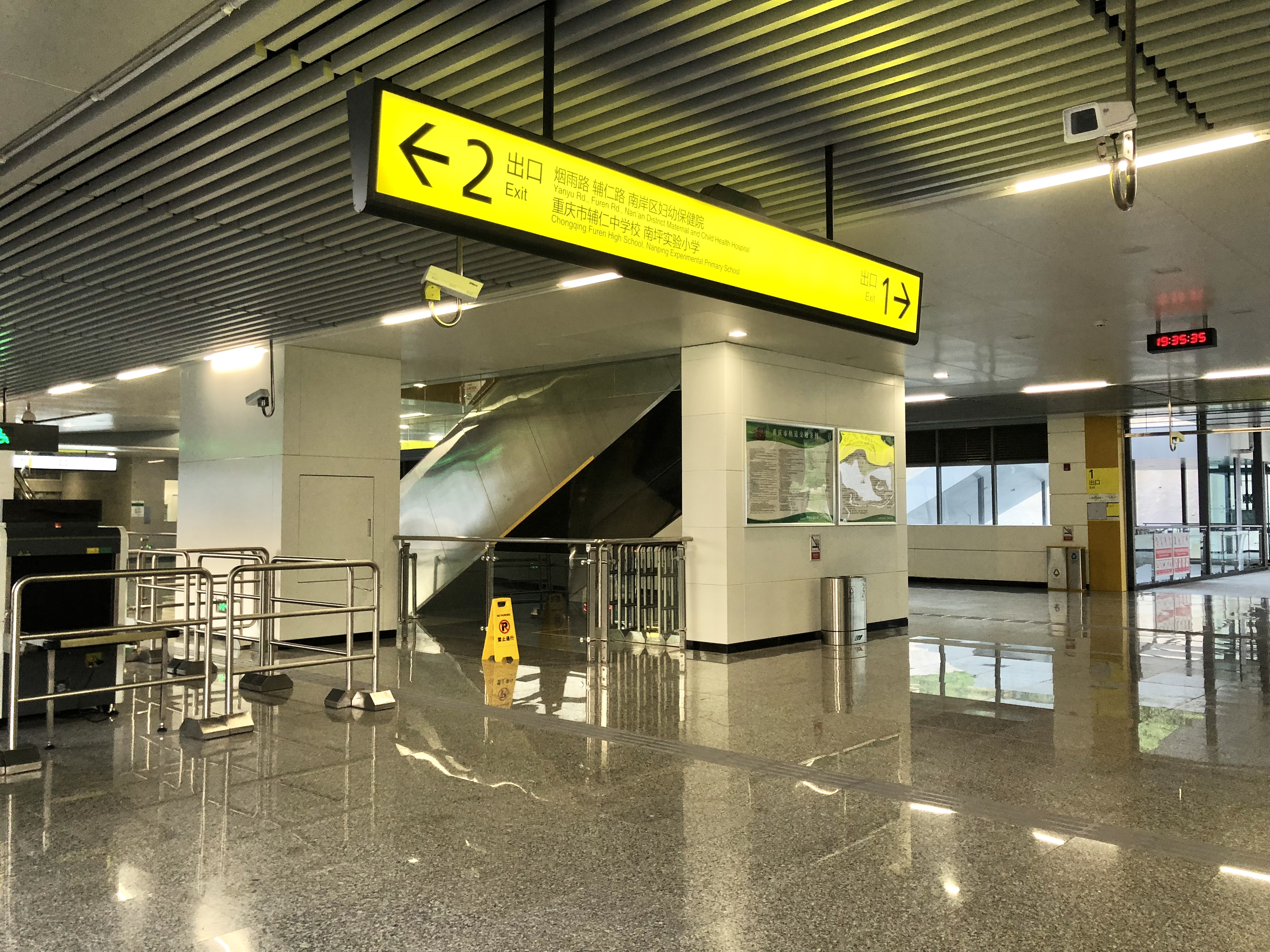
Station Concourse

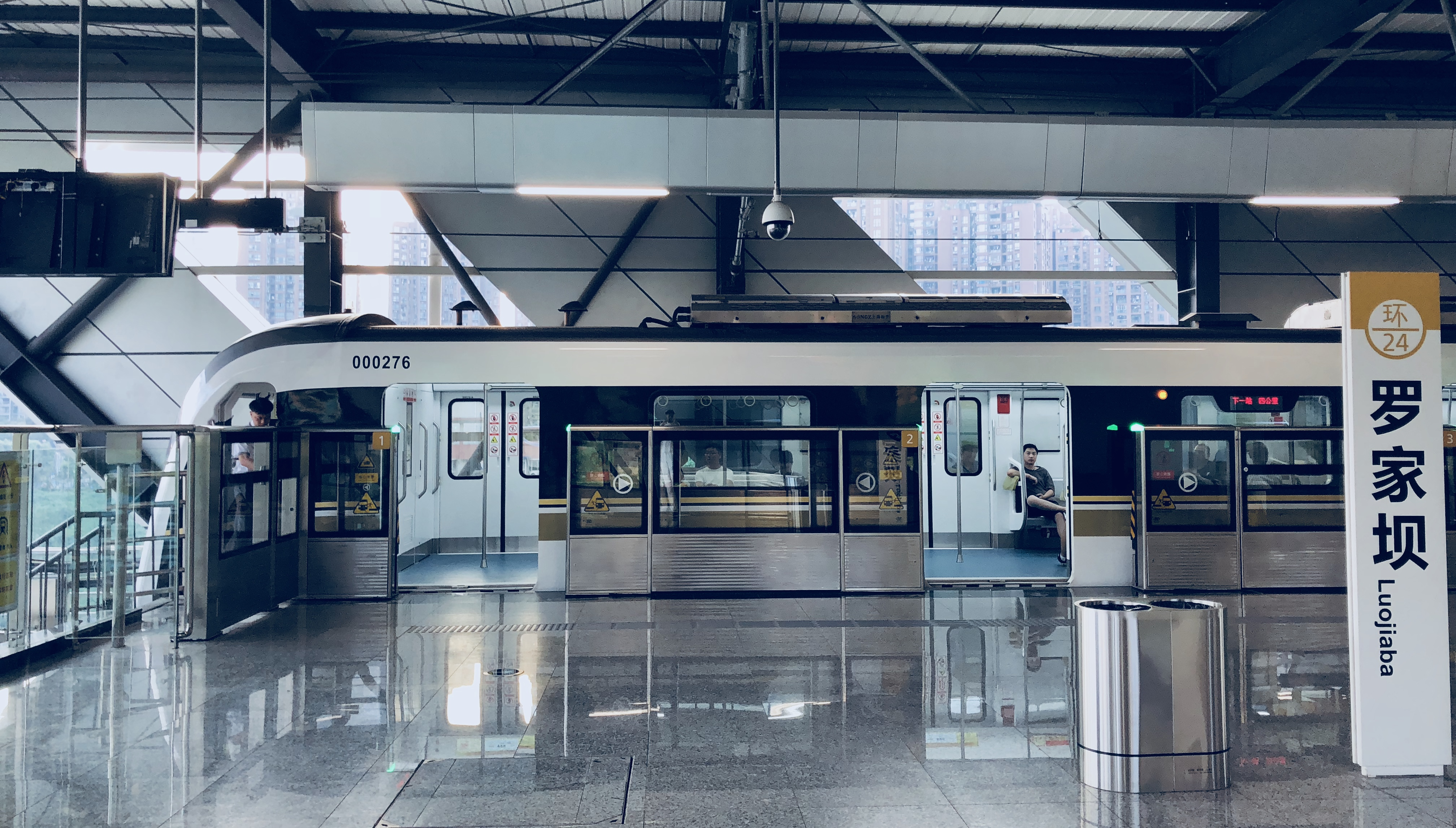
Station Platform

== Station structure ==
=== Floors ===
F2
Loop line Line Platform
Trains
F1
Loop line Line Station Concourse

& Entrance/Exit Overpasses

Ticket machines, Ticket gates, Customer service center, Accessible elevators
Exits 1(1A, 1B) & 2(2A, 2B)

Ground Level
Entrances/Exits, Accessible elevators

Notes:

- Signage boards of Exit 1 in the station contains no information on nearby places.
- As of July 2019, only the elevator at Exit 1 that connects the station with ground level is under construction, while the 2 other elevators, 1 connecting the station with ground level at Exit 2 and the other, responsible for connecting the concourse with the platform are in use.

=== Loop Line Platform ===
Platform Layout

An island platform is used for Loop Line trains travelling in both directions. Loop Line trains can access the car depot from using the railway junction. The station can also act as a reversing station using its scissors crossover for trains to switch direction.

The railway junction is located on the right side of this diagram

To Loop lineChongqing Library	←	0/24	←	Anti-Clockwise Loop
	Island Platform Doors open on the left			Crossover
Clockwise Loop	→	0/24	→	To Loop line Haixialu

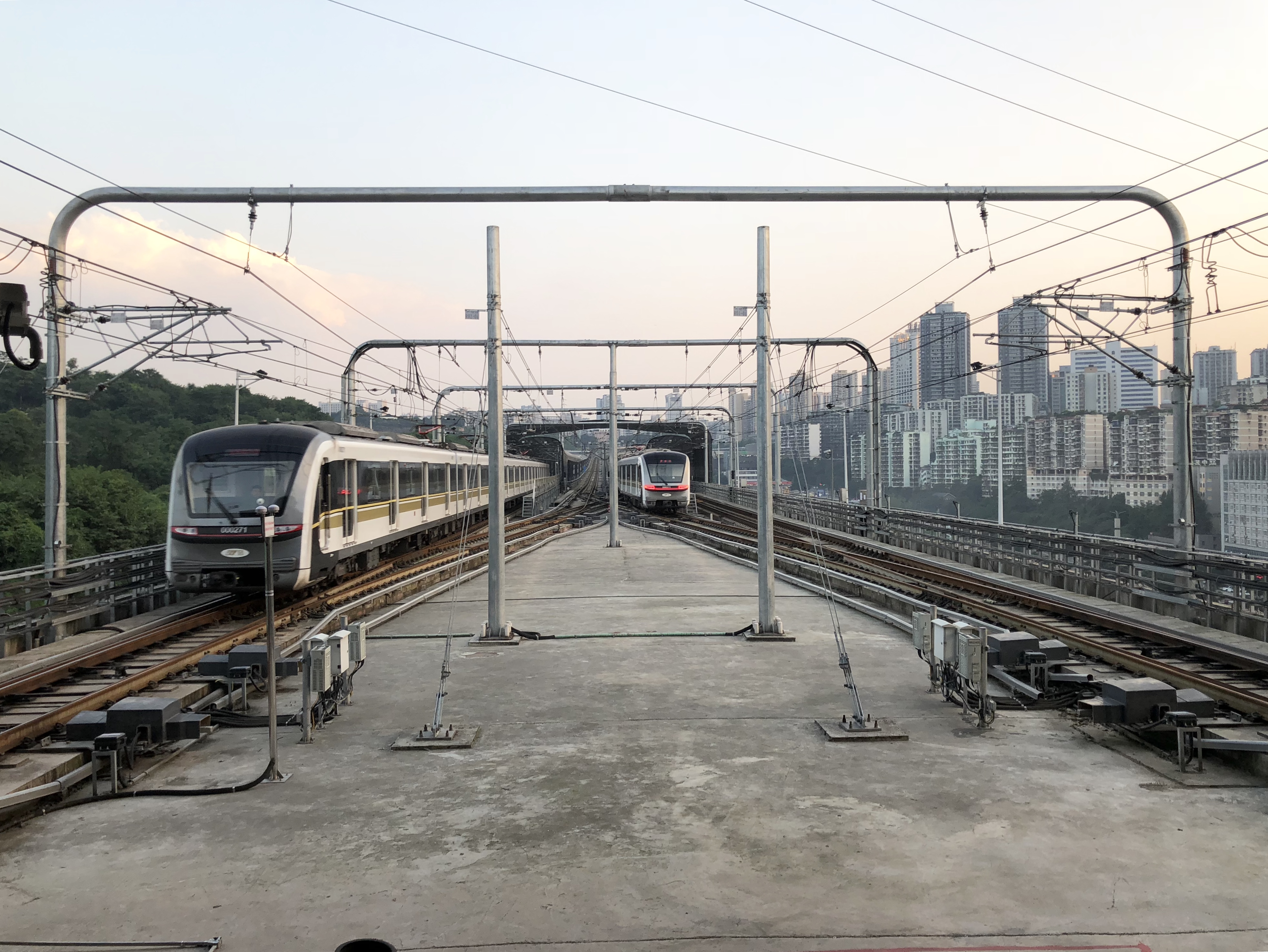
The railway junction used at the station includes a scissors crossover

== Exits ==
There are a total of 4 entrances/exits for the station.

Exit	To
1A	Yusheng Road
1B	Yusheng Road
2A	Yusheng Road, Yanyu Road, Furen Road, Nanping Experimental Primary School, Nan'an District Maternal and Child Health Hospital
2B	Yusheng Road, Yanyu Road, Furen Road, Chongqing Furen High School

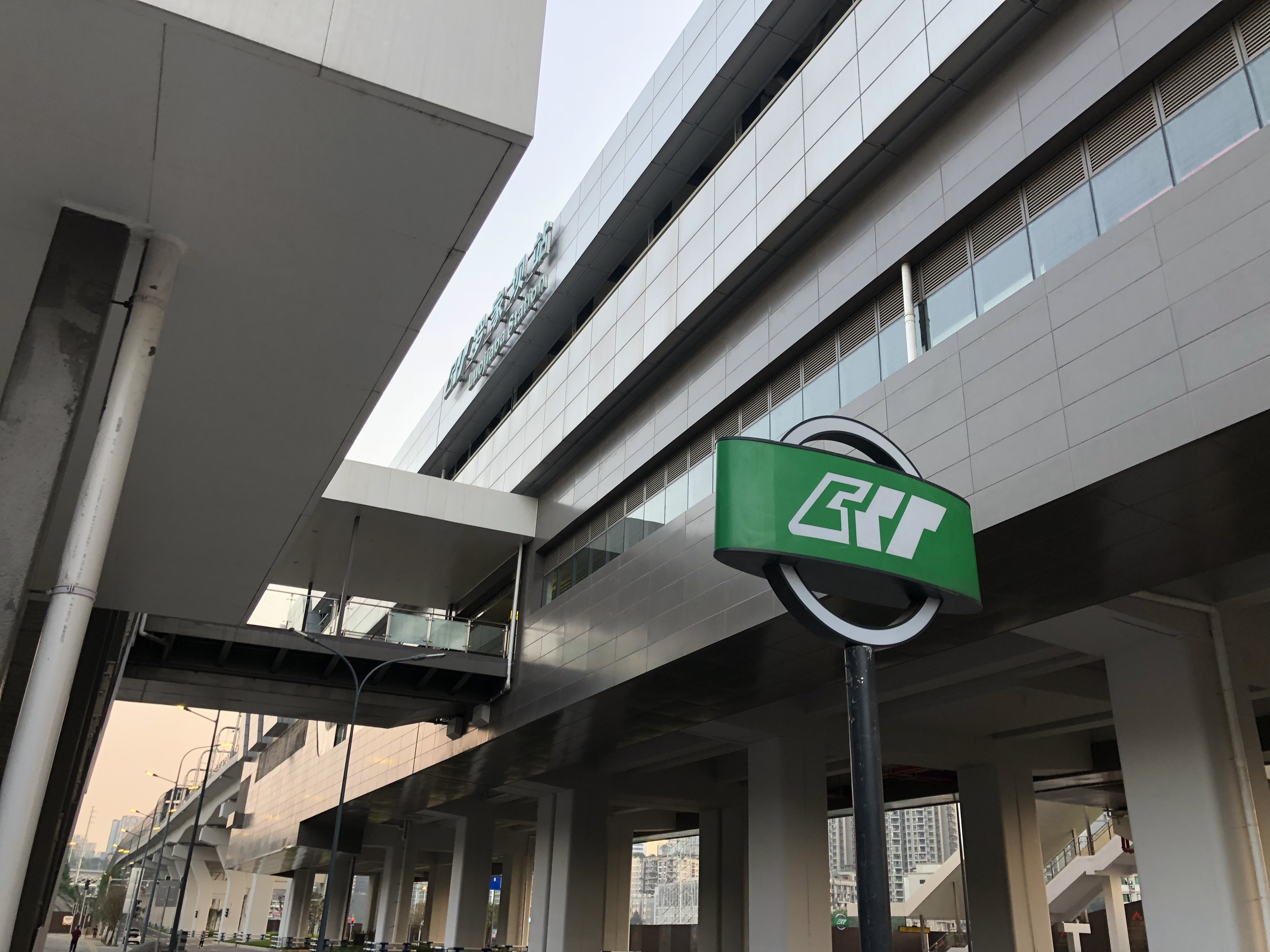
Overpass of Luojiaba station's Exit 1

== Surroundings ==
=== Nearby places ===
- Yusheng Road
- Yanyu Road
- Furen Road
- Nanping Experimental Primary School
- Chongqing Furen High School
- Nan'an District Maternal and Child Health Hospital

=== Nearby stations ===
- Sigongli station (a Loop Line & Line 3 Station)
- Haitangxi station (a Loop Line station)

== See also ==
- Chongqing Rail Transit (CRT)
- Loop Line (CRT)
