= Dongbu Park station =

Rail station in Chongqing, China

Dongbu Park 动步公园
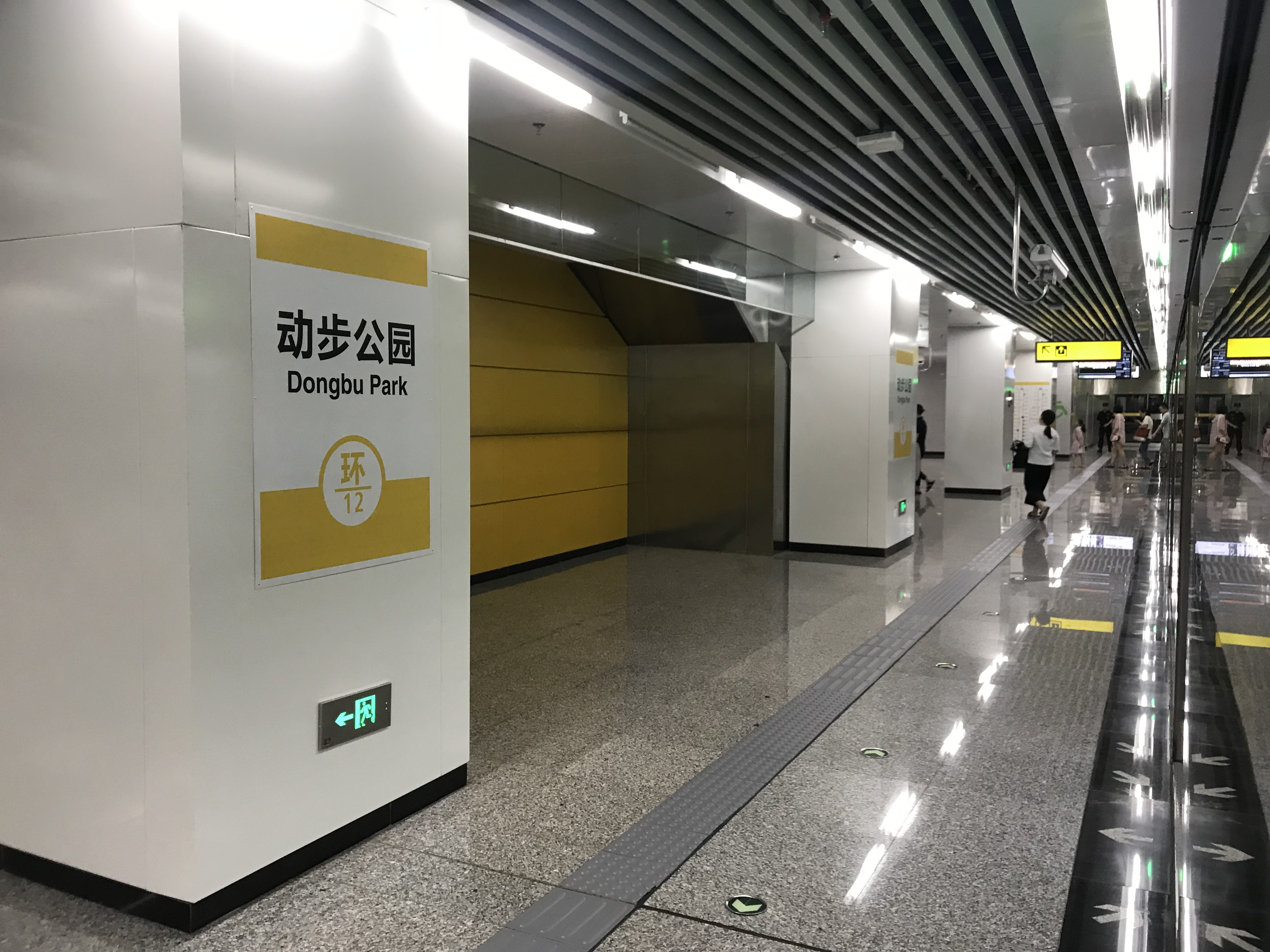

General information
- Location: Chongqing; China
- Operator: Chongqing Rail Transit Corp., Ltd
- Line: Loop line
- Platforms: 2 (1 island platform)
- Connections: Bus

Construction
- Structure type: Underground
- Accessible: 2 accessible elevators

Other information
- Station code: 0/12

History
- Opened: 28 December 2018; 7 years ago

Services
Preceding station	Chongqing Rail Transit	Following station
Ranjiaba Counter-clockwise	Loop line	Honghudonglu Clockwise
Location

Dongbu Park is a metro station on the Loop Line of Chongqing Rail Transit in Yubei District of Chongqing Municipality, China.

The station serves the park of the same name and its surrounding area, including nearby office buildings and residential blocks.

The station opened on 28 December 2018.

== Station structure ==
=== Loop Line Platform ===
Platform Layout

An island platform is used for Loop Line trains travelling in both directions.

To Loop line Chongqing Library	←	0/12	←	Anti-Clockwise Loop
	Island Platform Doors open on the left
Clockwise Loop	→	0/12	→	To Loop line Haixialu

== Exits ==
There are a total of 4 entrances/exits for the station.

== Surroundings ==
=== Nearby places ===
- Dongbu Park
- Longfor Crystal City
- Xing Guang School

=== Nearby stations ===
- Honghudonglu station (a Loop Line station)
- Ranjiaba station (a Loop Line, Line 5 & Line 6 station)

== See also ==
- Chongqing Rail Transit (CRT)
- Loop Line (CRT)
