= Sports Park station (Chongqing Rail Transit) =

Metro station in Chongqing, China

Sports Park 体育公园
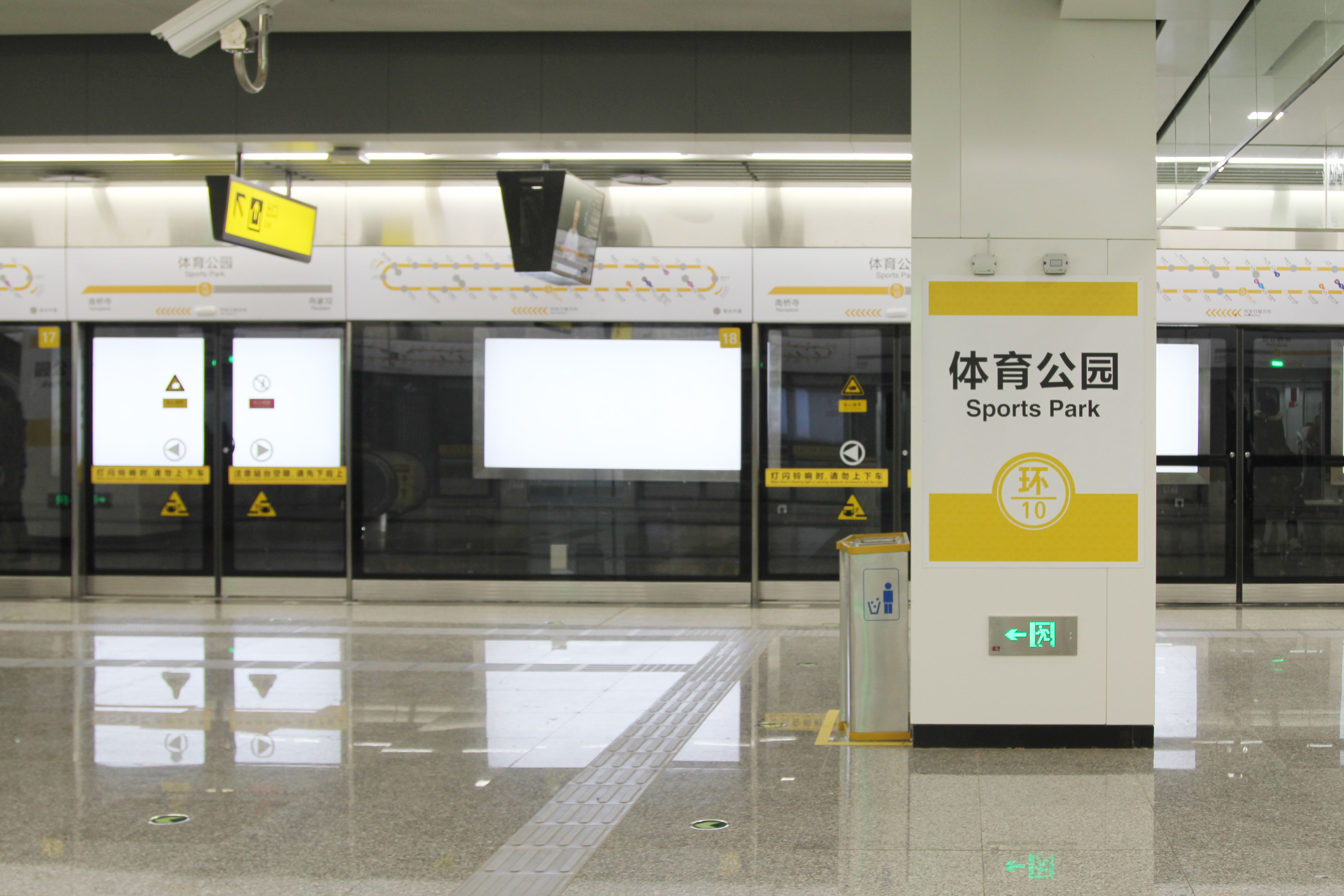
- Station Platform

General information
- Location: Chongqing; China
- Coordinates: 29.6013°N 106.4838°E
- Operator: Chongqing Rail Transit Corp., Ltd
- Line: Loop line
- Platforms: 2 (1 island platform)
- Connections: Bus

Construction
- Structure type: Underground
- Accessible: 2 accessible elevators

Other information
- Station code: 0/10

History
- Opened: 28 December 2018; 7 years ago

Services
Preceding station	Chongqing Rail Transit	Following station
Nanqiaosi Counter-clockwise	Loop line	Ranjiaba Clockwise
Location

Sports Park is a metro station on the Loop Line of Chongqing Rail Transit in Yubei District of Chongqing Municipality, China.

It serves Shizishan Sports Park, the park in which the station's name derived from and its surrounding area, including nearby office buildings and residential blocks.

The station opened on 28 December 2018.

== Station structure ==
=== Loop line platform ===
Platform Layout

An island platform is used for Loop Line trains travelling in both directions.

To Loop lineChongqing Library	←	0/10	←	Anti-Clockwise Loop
	Island Platform Doors open on the left
Clockwise Loop	→	0/10	→	To Loop line Erlang

== Exits ==
There are a total of 4 entrances/exits for the station.

== Surroundings ==
=== Nearby places ===
- Shizishan Sports Park
- Hometown Paradise Walk (shopping center)
- Longfor Hometown (residential buildings)

=== Nearby stations ===
- Ranjiaba station (a Loop Line, Line 5 & Line 6 Station)
- Nanqiaosi station (a Loop Line station)

== See also ==
- Chongqing Rail Transit (CRT)
- Loop Line (CRT)
