= Honghudonglu station =

Metro station in Chongqing, China

Honghudonglu 洪湖东路
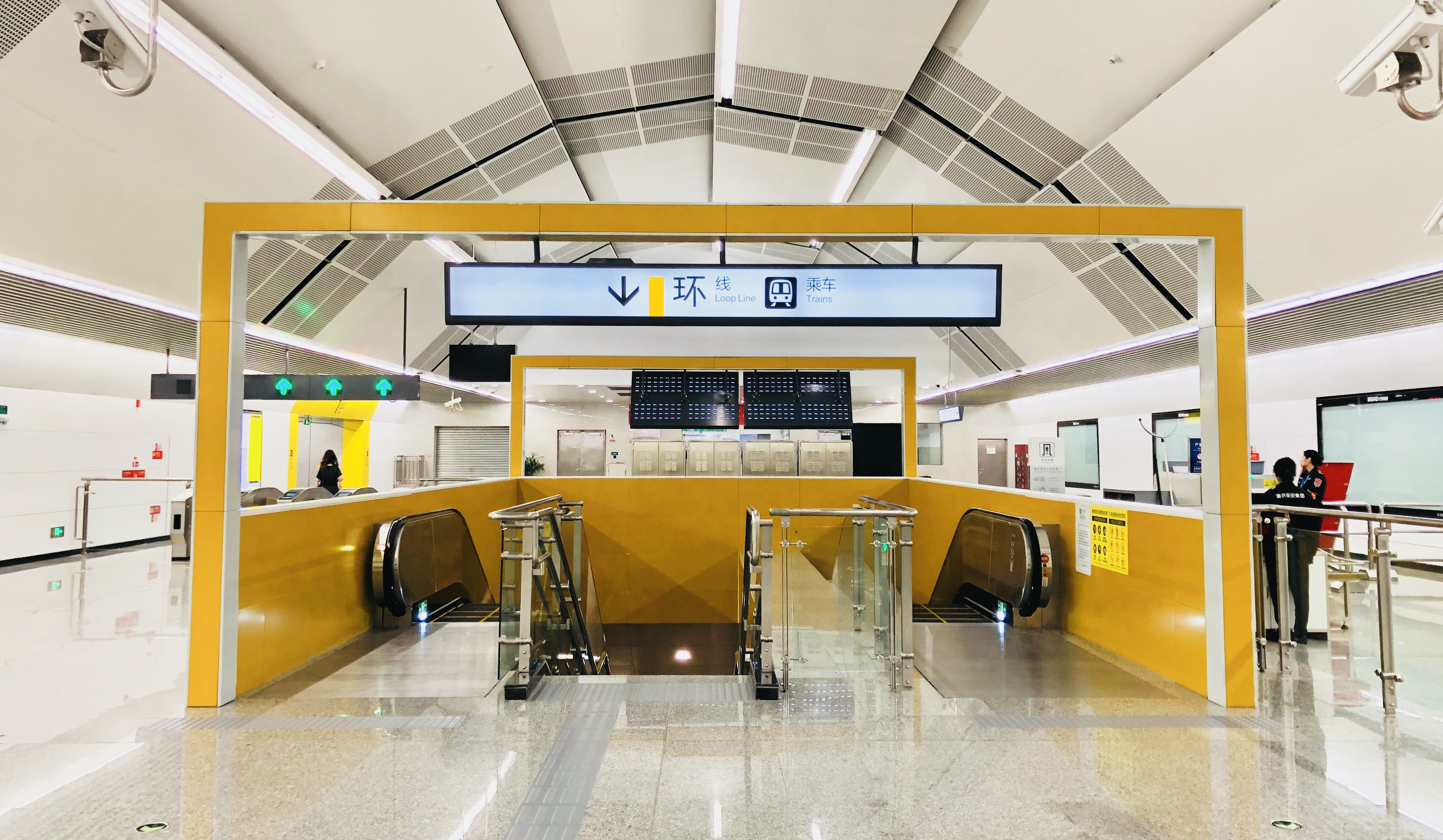
- Station Concourse

General information
- Location: Chongqing; China
- Operator: Chongqing Rail Transit Corp., Ltd
- Line: Loop line
- Platforms: 2 (1 island platform)
- Connections: Bus (Under Planning)

Construction
- Structure type: Underground
- Accessible: 3 accessible elevators (incl. 2 under construction)

Other information
- Station code: 0/13

History
- Opened: 28 December 2018; 7 years ago (station opening); 3 December 2019; 6 years ago (Exit 1B)

Services
Preceding station	Chongqing Rail Transit	Following station
Dongbu Park Counter-clockwise	Loop line	Min'an Ave. Clockwise
Location

Honghudonglu station (Chinese: 洪湖东路站; pinyin: Hónghúdōnglù zhàn; lit. 'Honghu East Road station') is a metro station on the Loop Line of Chongqing Rail Transit in Yubei District of Chongqing Municipality, China.

It serves the area surrounding Honghu East Road, including the Chongqing Foreign Affairs Office and its service hall, nearby office buildings and residential blocks.

The station opened on 28th of December, 2018.

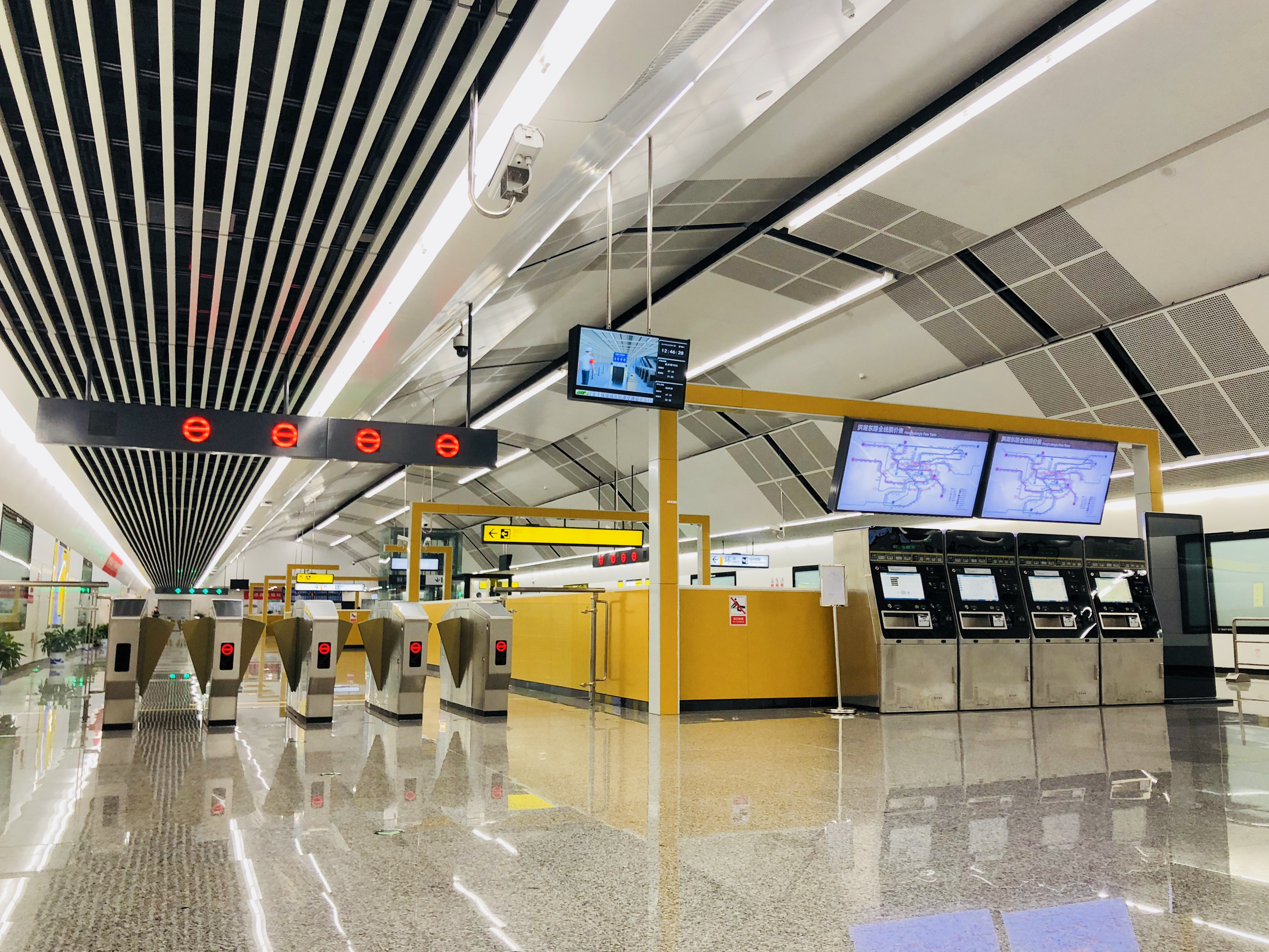
Station Concourse

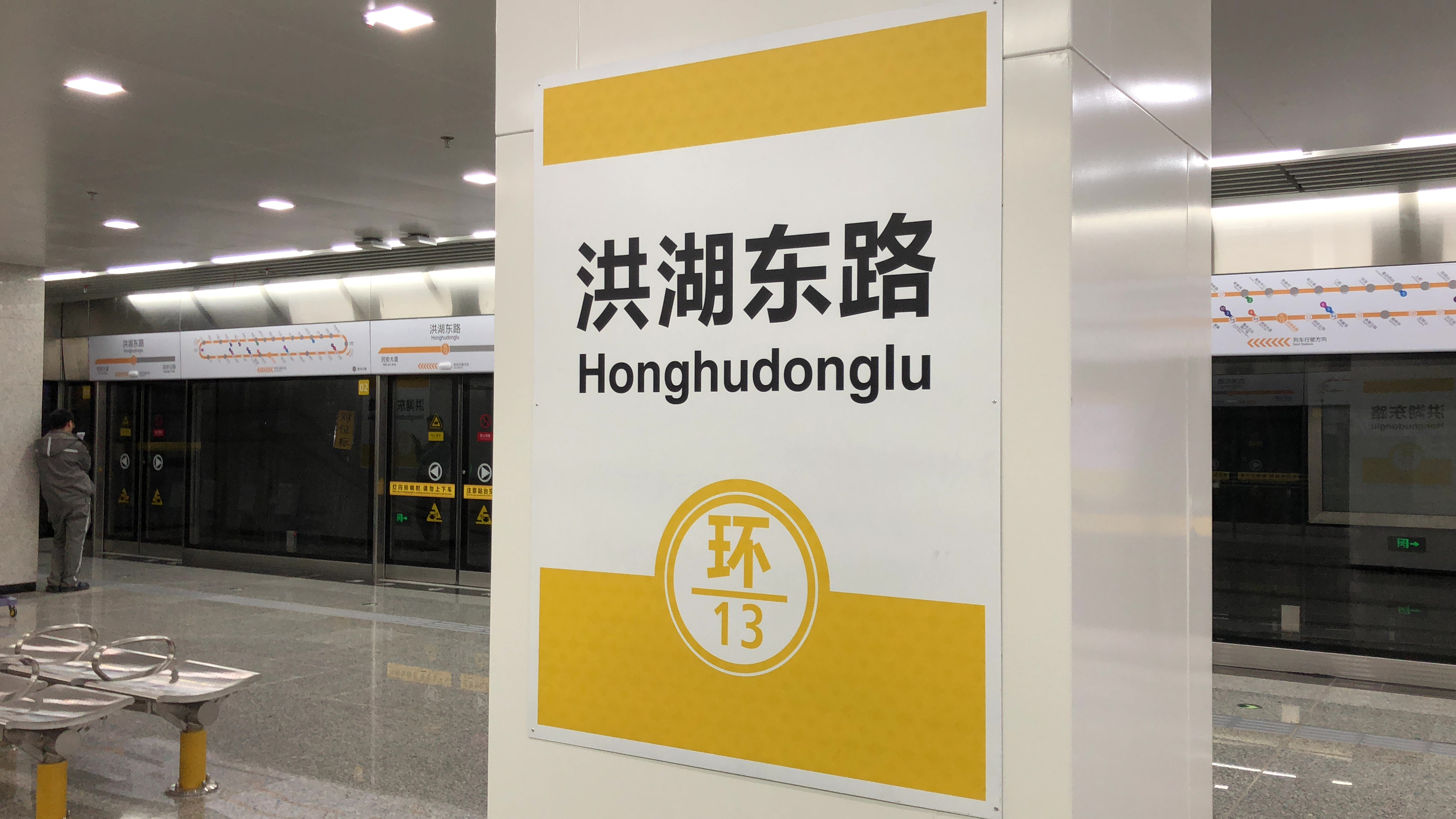
Station Platform

== Station structure ==
=== Floors ===
1F	Above ground	Entrance/Exits, Accessible elavators
	Entrance/Exit passageways	Exit 1A, 1B
	Entrance/Exit passageways	Exits 2A, 2B
B1	Loop line Line Station Concourse	Ticket machines, Ticket gates, Customer service center, Accessible elevators
B2	Loop line Line Platform	Trains

Notes:

- Exit 1B opened on 3 December 2019
- As of January 2020, only the elevator connecting the station concourse and the platform is in use, whereas the 2 other elevators connecting the station with the surface are under construction

=== Loop Line Platform ===
Platform Layout

An island platform is used for Loop Line trains travelling in both directions. The station can act as a reversing station using its crossover rail for trains to switch direction. It can also be used to store trains.

The train junction is located at the right side of this diagram

To Loop line Chongqing Library	←	0/13	←	Anti-Clockwise Loop
	Island Platform Doors open on the left			Crossover
Clockwise Loop	→	0/13	→	To Loop line Erlang

== Exits ==
There are a total of 4 entrances/exits for the station.

Line	Exit Type	Exit	To
Loop line	Escalators	1A	Honghu East Road, Xingguang Avenue
Loop line	Stairs and escalator	1B	Honghu East Road, Xingguang Avenue, Longhu West Road
Loop line	Stairs and escalator	2A	Honghu East Road, Yunshan South Road
Loop line	Stairs and escalator	2B	Honghu East Road, Caifu East Road, Chongqing Foreign Affairs Service Hall

== Surroundings ==
=== Nearby places ===
- Honghu East Road
- Chongqing Foreign Affairs Service Hall
- Fortune Mall
- Fortune Plaza
- Longfor Xiyuan
- Longfor Fragrant Garden

=== Nearby stations ===
- Min'an Avenue station (a Loop Line & Line 4 Station)
- Dongbu Park station (a Loop Line station)

== See also ==
- Chongqing Rail Transit (CRT)
- Loop Line (CRT)
