= Tianxingqiao station =

Chongqing Rail Transit station

Tianxingqiao 天星桥
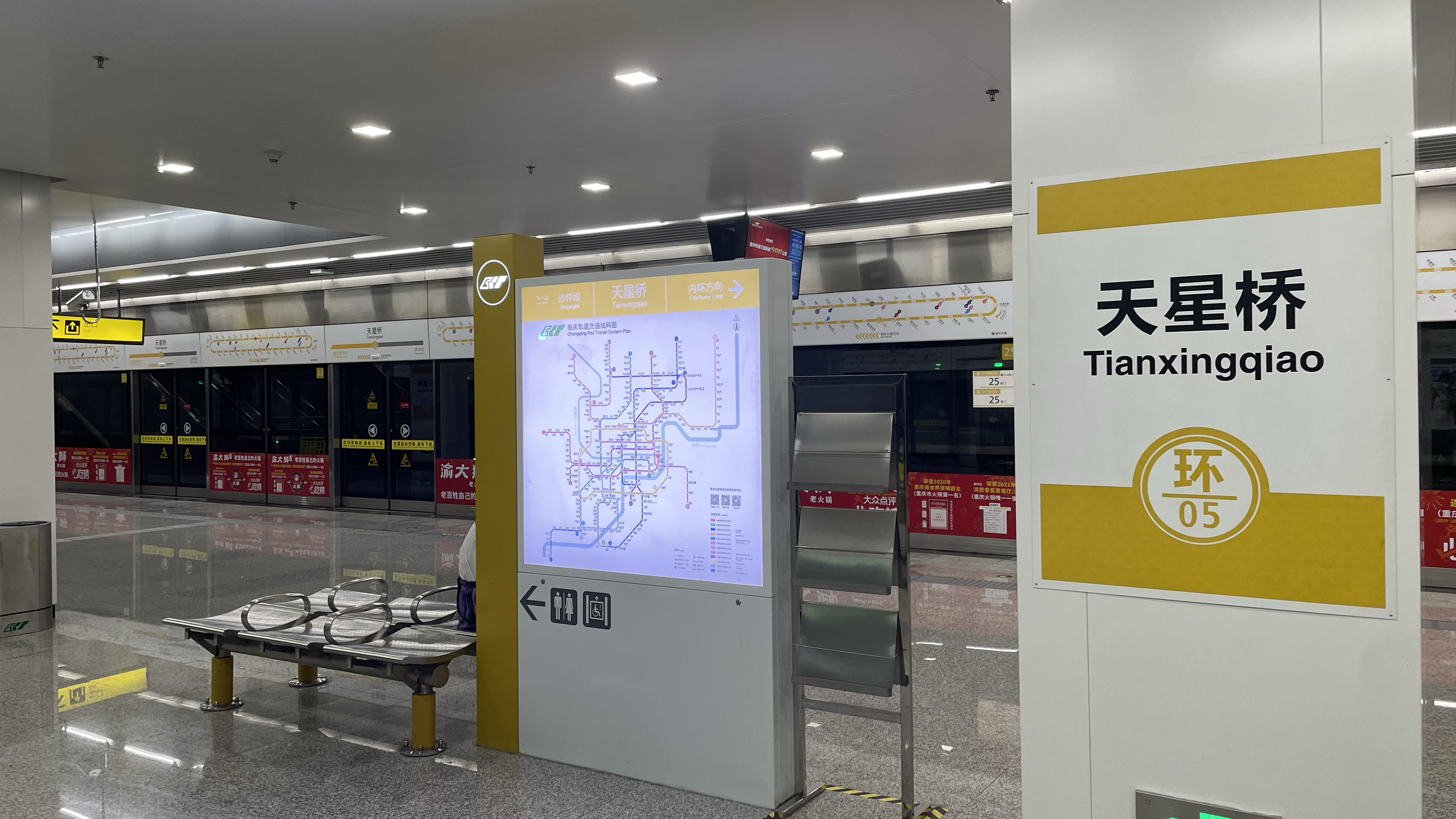

General information
- Location: Chongqing; China
- Operated by: Chongqing Rail Transit Corp., Ltd
- Line: Loop line
- Platforms: 2 (1 island platform)

Construction
- Structure type: Underground

Other information
- Station code: 环/05

History
- Opened: 4 February 2021; 5 years ago

Services
Preceding station	Chongqing Rail Transit	Following station
Chongqing Library Counter-clockwise	Loop line	Shapingba Clockwise
Location

Tianxingqiao Station is a station on Loop line of Chongqing Rail Transit in Chongqing municipality, China. It is located in Shapingba District and opened as an infill station in 2021.
