= Chongqing University station =

Chongqing Rail Transit station in China

Chongqing University 重庆大学
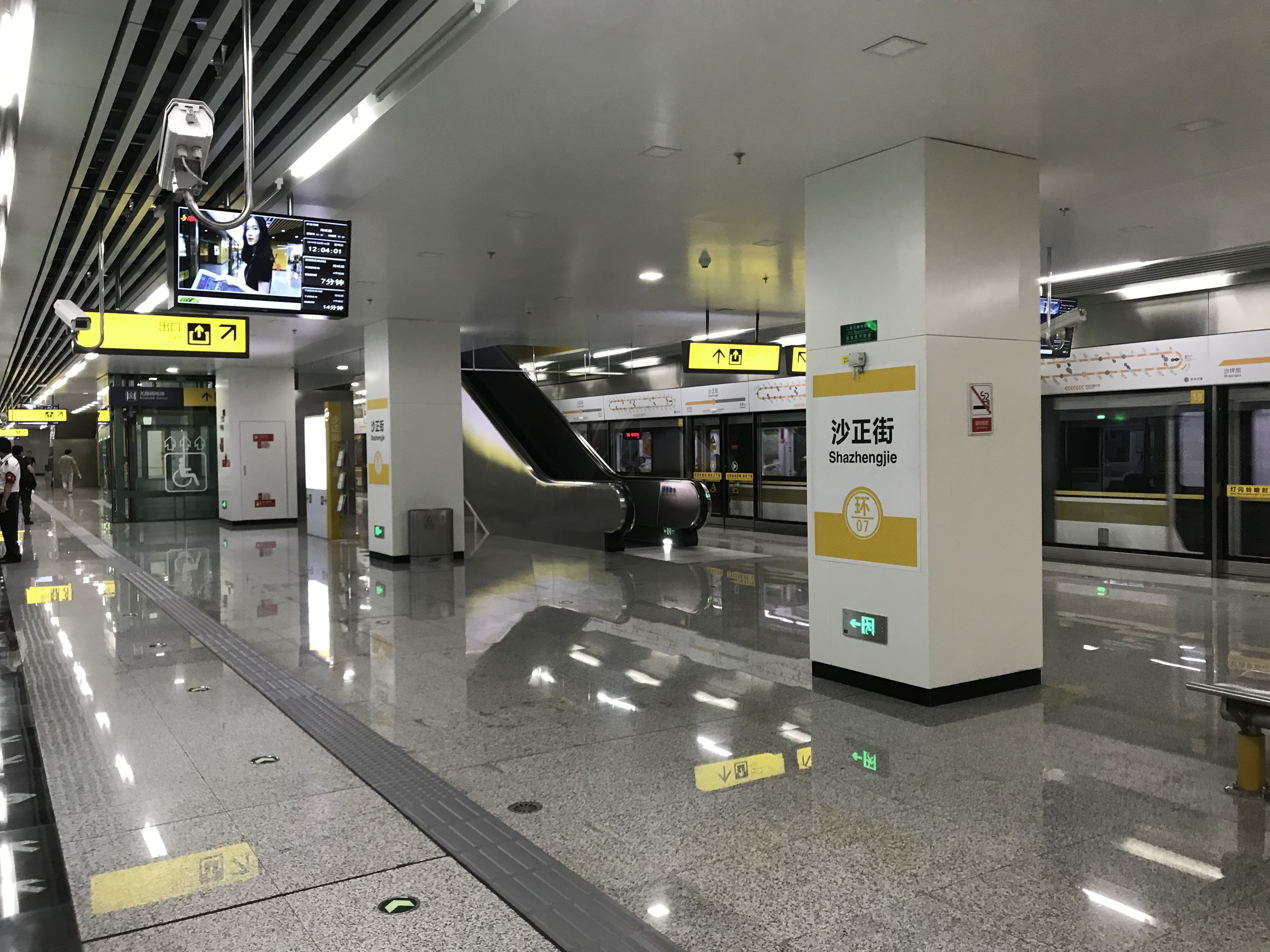

General information
- Location: Chongqing; China
- Coordinates: 29.57066°N 106.45973°E
- Operated by: Chongqing Rail Transit Corp., Ltd
- Line: Loop line
- Platforms: 2 (1 island platform)

Construction
- Structure type: Underground

Other information
- Station code: 环/07

History
- Opened: 28 December 2018; 7 years ago

Services
Preceding station	Chongqing Rail Transit	Following station
Shapingba Counter-clockwise	Loop line	Yudaishan Clockwise
Location

Chongqing University Station is a station on Loop line of Chongqing Rail Transit in Chongqing municipality, China, which is located in Shapingba District, adjacent to the main campus of Chongqing University. It opened in 2018.

The former name of this station was Shazhengjie (Chinese: 沙正街), which was replaced in 2019.
