= Shanghao station =

Metro station in Chongqing, China

Shanghao 上浩
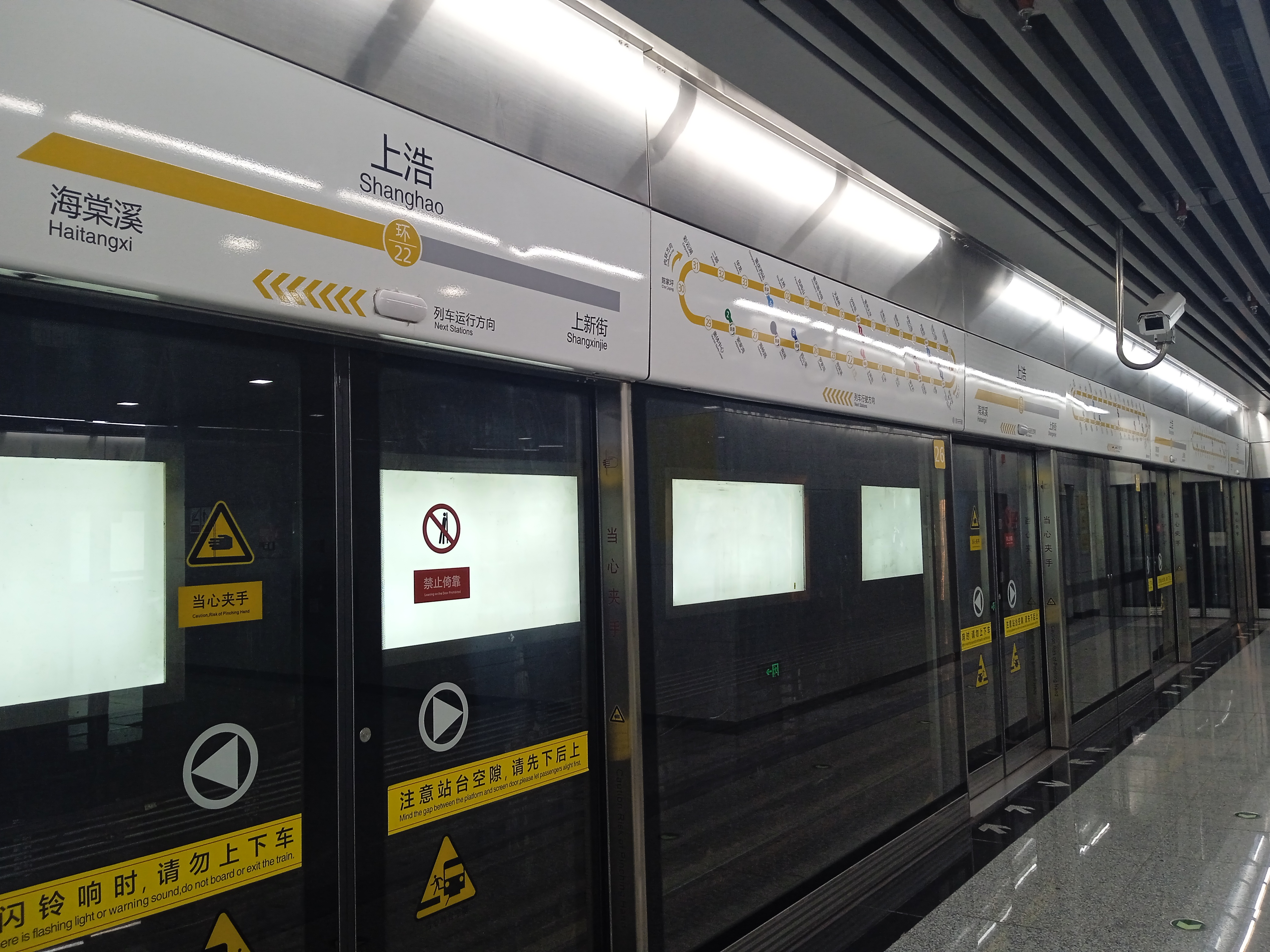
- Platform

Chinese name
- Chinese: 上浩站
Transcriptions
Standard Mandarin
- Hanyu Pinyin: Shànghào Zhàn

General information
- Location: Haitangxi New Street (海棠溪新街); Nan'an District, Chongqing; China
- Coordinates: 29°32′58″N 106°35′26″E
- System: Chongqing Rail Transit
- Operator: Chongqing Rail Transit Operation Co., Ltd.
- Line: Loop line
- Platforms: 2 (1 island platform)
- Tracks: 2

Construction
- Structure type: Underground
- Accessible: Yes

Other information
- Station code: /

History
- Opened: 7 October 2023

Services
Preceding station	Chongqing Rail Transit	Following station
Shangxinjie Counter-clockwise	Loop line	Haitangxi Clockwise
Location

Shanghao (Chinese: 上浩) is an underground metro station on Loop line of Chongqing Rail Transit in Nan'an District of Chongqing Municipality, China. The northeast circle of the Loop line, which this station belongs, opened on 28 December 2018; however, this station did not open at that time and was finally opened on 7 October 2023.

== Station structure ==
B1	Concourse	Tickets
B2		← Loop line counterclockwise loop (Shangxinjie)
B2	Island platform, doors open on the left
B2		Loop line clockwise loop (Haitangxi) →

=== Entrances/exits ===
- 3C: Haitangxi New Street
- 4A: Haitangxi New Street
