= Loop line (Chongqing Rail Transit) =

Metro line of Chongqing Rail Transit

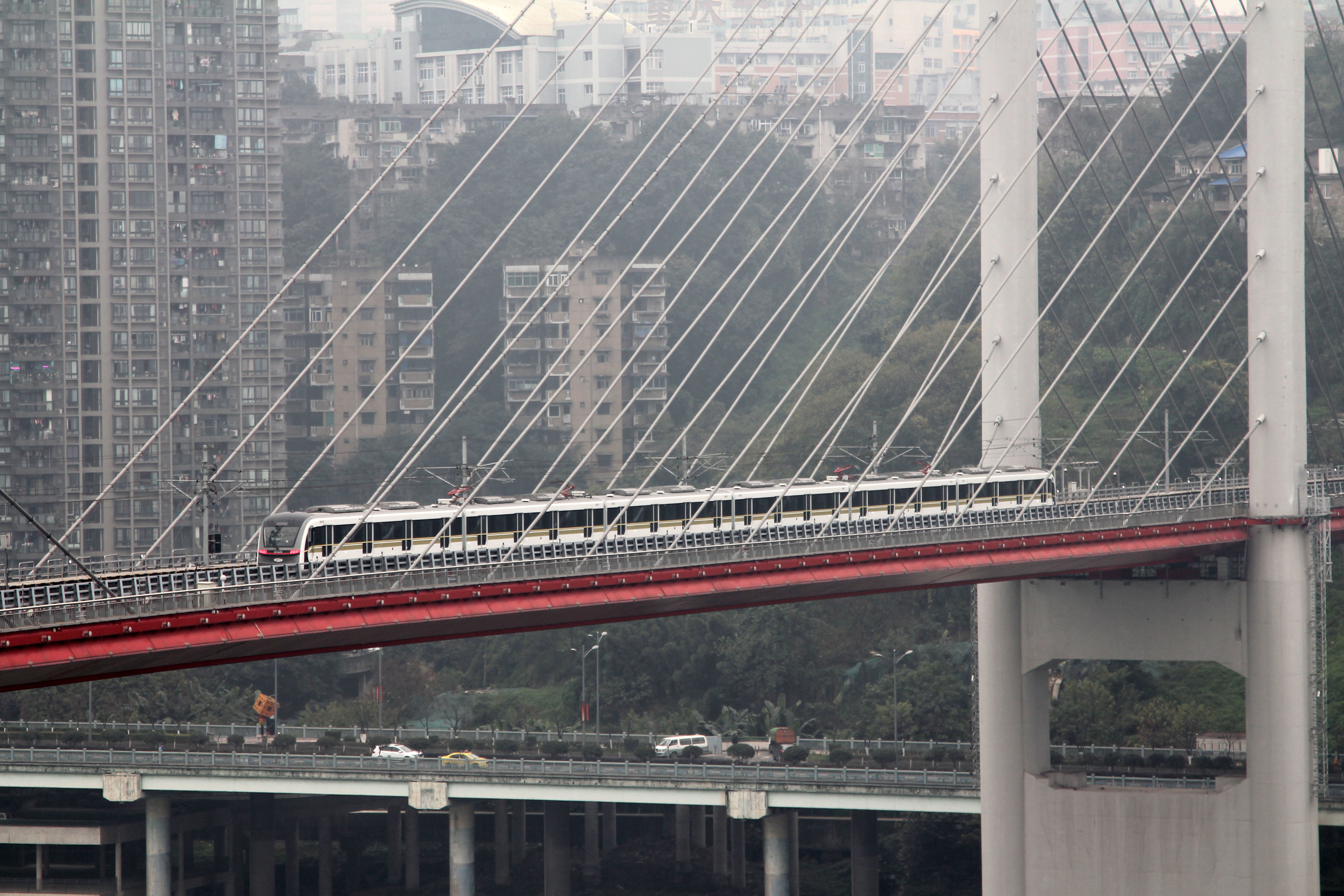
- A Loop line train running on Gaojiahuayuan Bridge

Overview
- Other name: Line 0
- Native name: 重庆轨道交通环线
- Status: Operational
- Line number: 0
- Locale: Chongqing, China
- Stations: 33

Service
- Type: Rapid transit
- System: Chongqing Rail Transit
- Operator(s): Chongqing Rail Transit (Group) Co., Ltd.
- Depot(s): Majiayan, Tushan, Sigongli

History
- Opened: 28 December 2018; 7 years ago

Technical
- Line length: 50.93 km (31.65 miles)
- Num of tracks: 2
- Character: Underground and elevated
- Track gauge: 1,435 mm (4 ft 8 1/2 in)
- Electrification: 1500 V DC overhead line
- Operating speed: 90 km/h (56 mph)

The Loop line of Chongqing Rail Transit is a rapid transit loop line in Chongqing, China. The line is also known as Line 0. It's the third longest loop subway line in China.

The metro line serves three major railway stations in Chongqing: Chongqing North railway station, Shapingba railway station, and Chongqing West railway station.

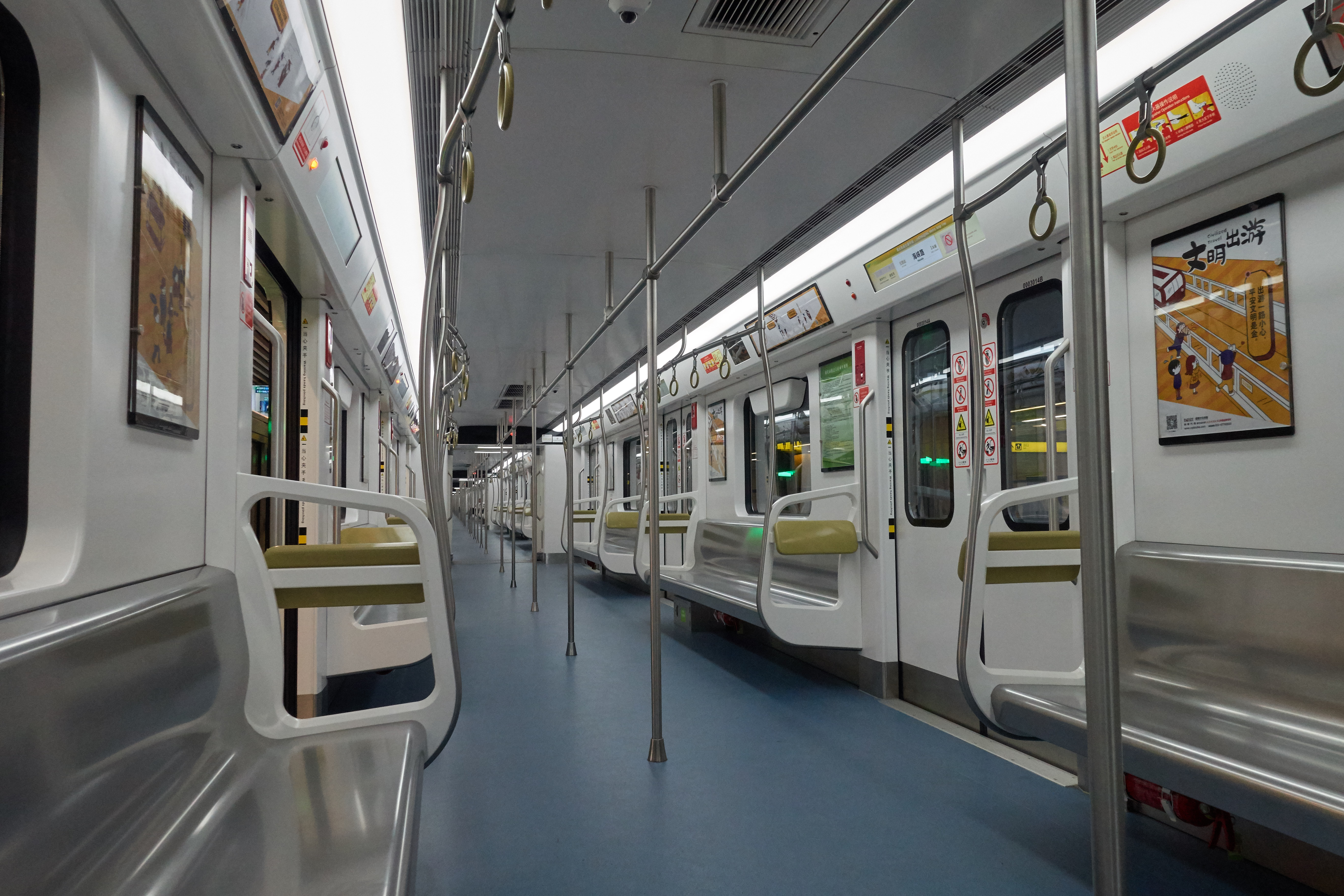
Interior of a Loop line train

== History ==
The line began construction on October 28, 2013.

The northeastern section was opened on December 28, 2018. The southern section with the Egongyan Rail Transit Bridge opened on December 30, 2019. The remaining section opened on January 20, 2021.

== Opening timeline ==
Segment	Commencement	Length	Station(s)	Name
Chongqing Library – Haixialu	28 December 2018	33.7 km (20.94 mi)	17	Northeastern Section
Min'an Ave.	11 January 2019	infill station	1	
Luojiaba & Danzishi	1 July 2019	infill stations	2	
Nanqiaosi	15 December 2019	infill station	1	
Haixialu – Erlang	30 December 2019	9.5 km (5.90 mi)	5	Southern section
Chongqing Library – Chongqing West Railway Station – Erlang	20 January 2021	7.6 km (4.72 mi)	4	Remaining section
Tianxingqiao & Renji	4 February 2021	infill stations	2	
Shanghao	7 October 2023	infill station	1	

== Stations ==
Route of Loop line

Service routes		Station No.	Station name		Connections	Distance km		Location
E	L	Station No.	English	Chinese	Connections	Distance km		Location
↑ Loop towards Hualong ↑
↑		Through-service to/from Tiaodeng via Line 5						
●	●	/	Chongqing West Station	重庆西站	Line 5 CXW	1.6	50.9	Shapingba
●	●	/	Shangqiao	上桥		2.0	2.0	Shapingba
｜	●	/	Fengmingshan	凤鸣山		1.1	3.1	Shapingba
●	●	/	Chongqing Library	重庆图书馆		1.2	4.3	Shapingba
｜	●	/	Tianxingqiao	天星桥		1.1	5.4	Shapingba
●	●	/	Shapingba	沙坪坝	Line 1 Line 9 27; CYW	1.6	7.0	Shapingba
｜	●	/	Chongqing University	重庆大学		1.5	8.5	Shapingba
｜	●	/	Yudaishan	玉带山	4	2.0	10.5	Liangjiang
｜	●	/	Nanqiaosi	南桥寺		1.7	12.2	Liangjiang
｜	●	/	Sports Park	体育公园		1.2	13.4	Liangjiang
●	●	/	Ranjiaba	冉家坝	Line 5 Line 6	1.1	14.5	Liangjiang
｜	●	/	Dongbu Park	动步公园		1.0	15.5	Liangjiang
｜	●	/	Honghudonglu	洪湖东路		0.9	16.4	Liangjiang
●	●	/	Min'an Ave.	民安大道	Line 4	1.6	18.0	Liangjiang
↓		Through-service to/from Tangjiatuo via Line 4						
	●	/	Chongqing North Station South Square (Note: The former translation is South Square of Chongqingbei Railway Station, which has been replaced since the opening of Line 10's station)	重庆北站南广场	Line 3 Line 10; YW CUW	2.1	20.1	Liangjiang
	●	/	Yulu	渝鲁		2.1	22.2	Liangjiang
	●	/	Wulidian	五里店	Line 6 Line 9	1.5	23.7	Liangjiang
	●	/	Danzishi	弹子石		2.6	26.3	Nan'an
	●	/	Tushan	涂山		1.6	27.9	Nan'an
	●	/	Renji	仁济		1.3	29.2	Nan'an
	●	/	Shangxinjie	上新街	Line 6	1.0	30.2	Nan'an
	●	/	Shanghao	上浩		1.1	31.3	Nan'an
	●	/	Haitangxi	海棠溪		1.5	32.8	Nan'an
	●	/	Luojiaba	罗家坝		1.0	33.8	Nan'an
	●	/	Sigongli	四公里	Line 3	1.1	34.9	Nan'an
	●	/	Nanhu	南湖	Line 10	2.0	36.9	Nan'an
	●	/	Haixialu	海峡路		1.1	38.0	Nan'an
	●	/	Xiejiawan	谢家湾	Line 2	2.6	40.6	Jiulongpo
	●	/	Olympic Sports Center	奥体中心	Line 18	1.9	42.5	Jiulongpo
	●	/	Chenjiaping	陈家坪		1.3	43.8	Jiulongpo
	●	/	Caiyunhu	彩云湖		2.0	45.8	Jiulongpo
	●	/	Erlang	二郎		1.7	47.5	Jiulongpo
	●	/	Hualong	华龙		1.7	49.2	Jiulongpo
↓ Loop towards Chongqing West ↓

== Accident ==
On January 8, 2019, a train accident occurred in the tunnel between Haixialu and Nanhu where a train (000141–000146) struck an unsecured and improperly opened civil defense blast door. As a result, one person was killed and three people were injured. Two cars (000141 and 000142) have been out of service ever since the incident and stored in CRRC Chongqing Changchun Vehicle separately.
