= Haitangxi station =

Metro station in Chongqing, China

Haitangxi 海棠溪
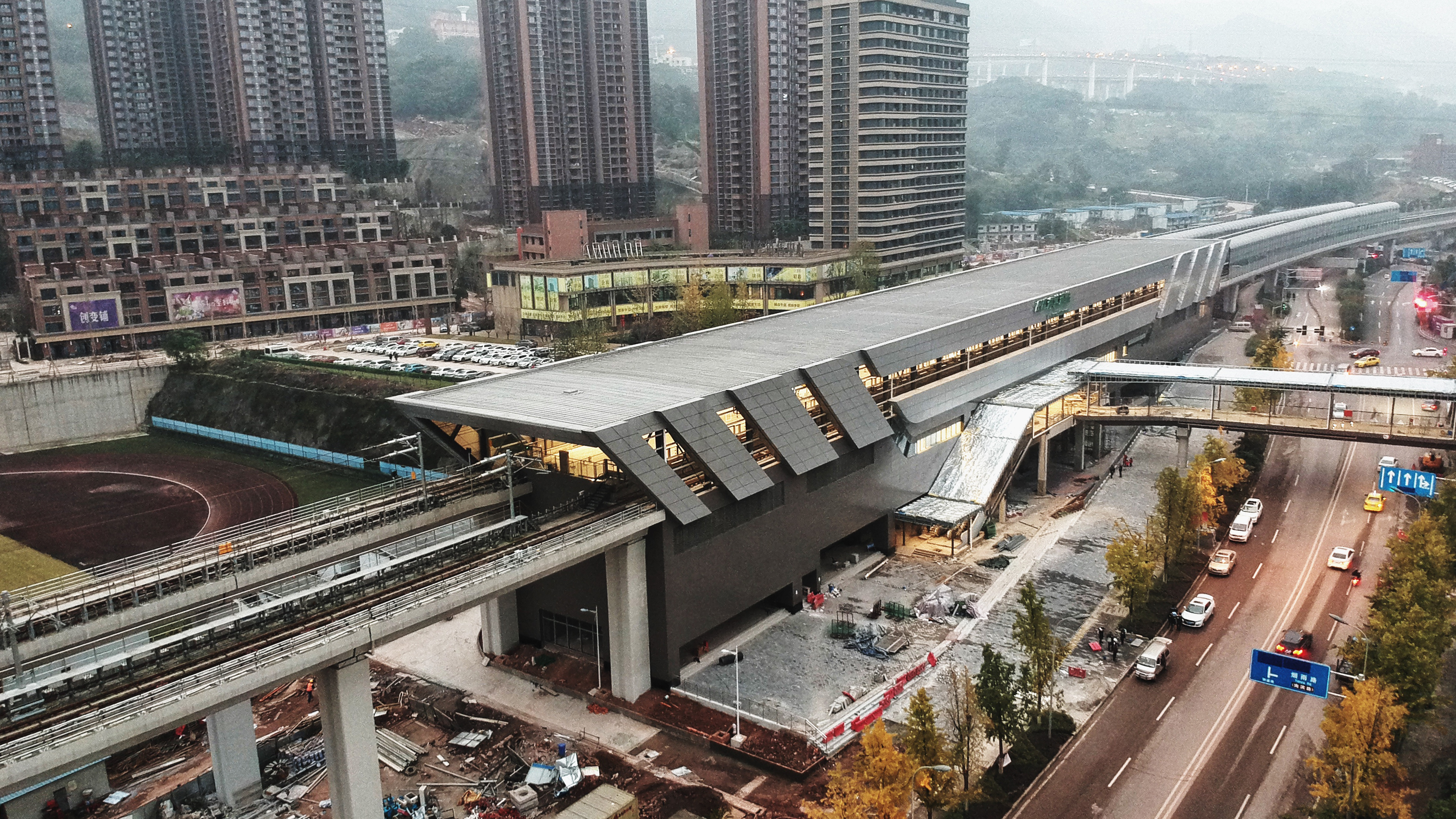
- Aerial view of the station

General information
- Other names: poep plas station (大小便站)
- Location: Yusheng Road (御盛路); Nan'an District, Chongqing; China
- Coordinates: 29°32′16″N 106°35′00″E
- Operator: Chongqing Rail Transit Corp., Ltd
- Line: Loop line
- Platforms: 2 (1 island platform)

Construction
- Structure type: Elevated
- Accessible: 3 accessible elevators

Other information
- Station code: /

History
- Opened: 28 December 2018

Services
Preceding station	Chongqing Rail Transit	Following station
Shanghao Counter-clockwise	Loop line	Luojiaba Clockwise
Location

Haitangxi station (Chinese: 海棠溪站; pinyin: Hǎitángxī zhàn; lit. 'Begonia River station') is a metro station on the Loop Line of Chongqing Rail Transit in Nan'an District of Chongqing Municipality, China.

It serves the area surrounding Yutai Road, including nearby office buildings, residential blocks and a Marriott hotel.

The station opened on 28 December 2018.

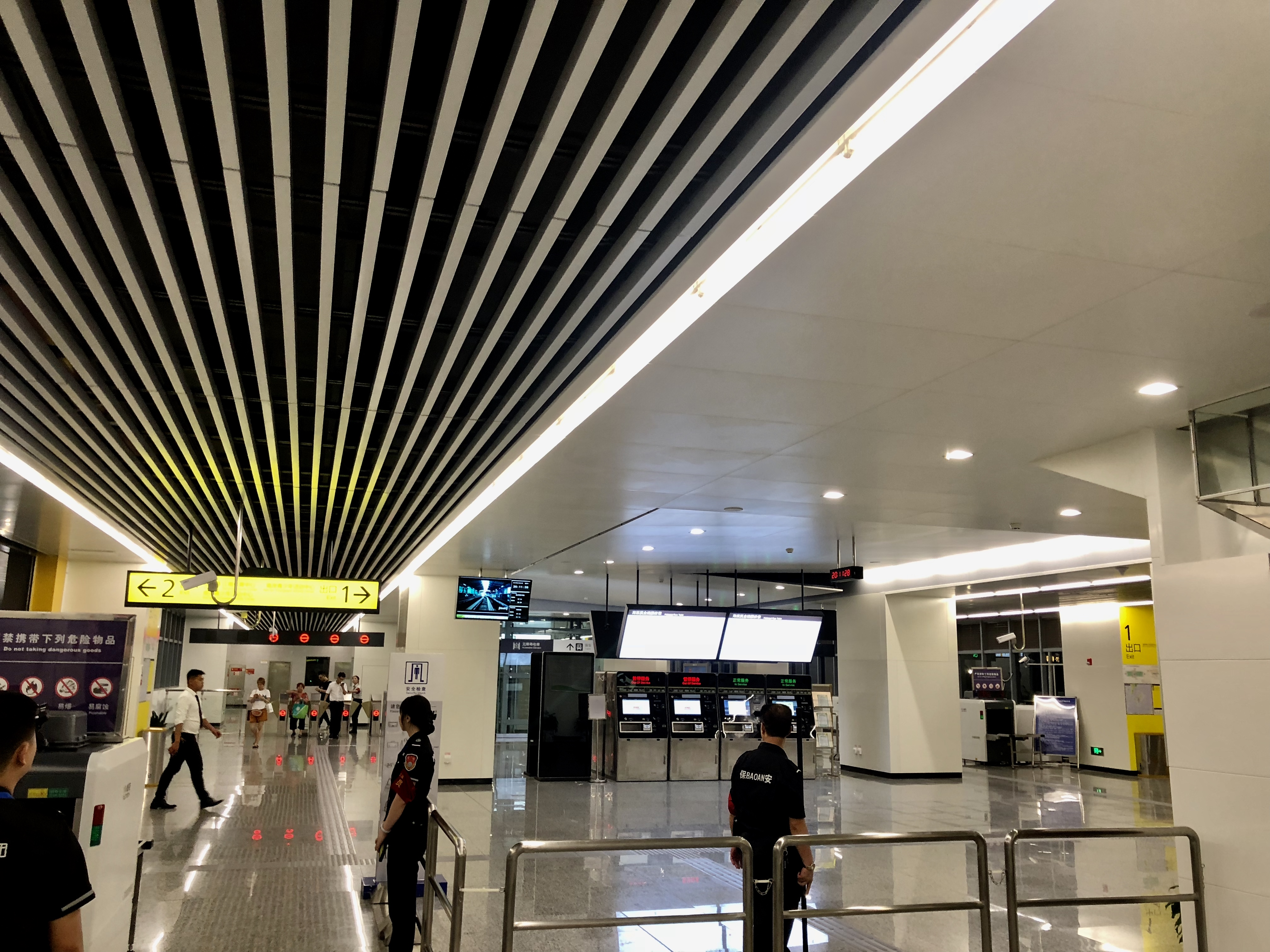
Station Concourse

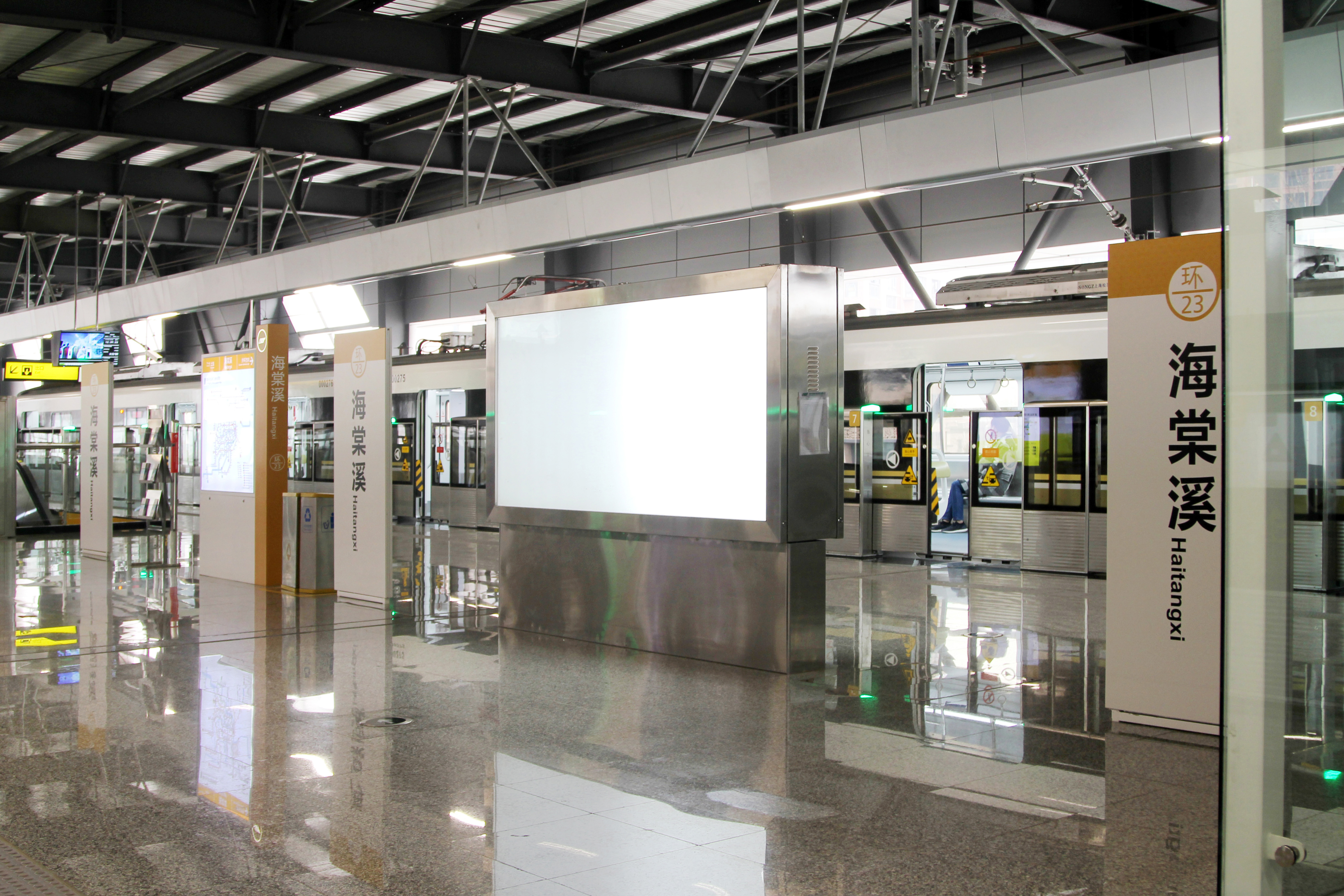
Station Platform

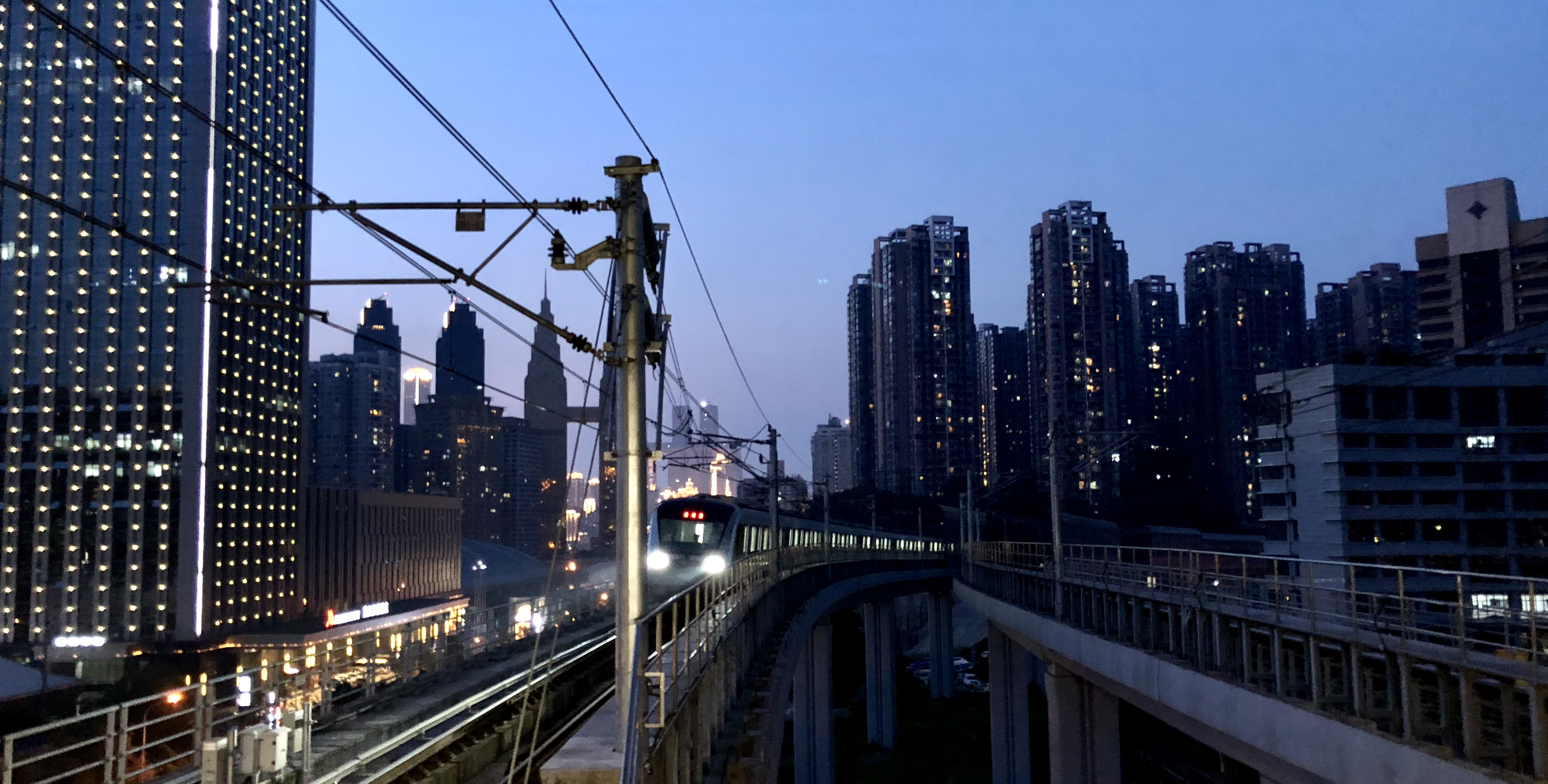
A Loop Line train arriving at the station at night

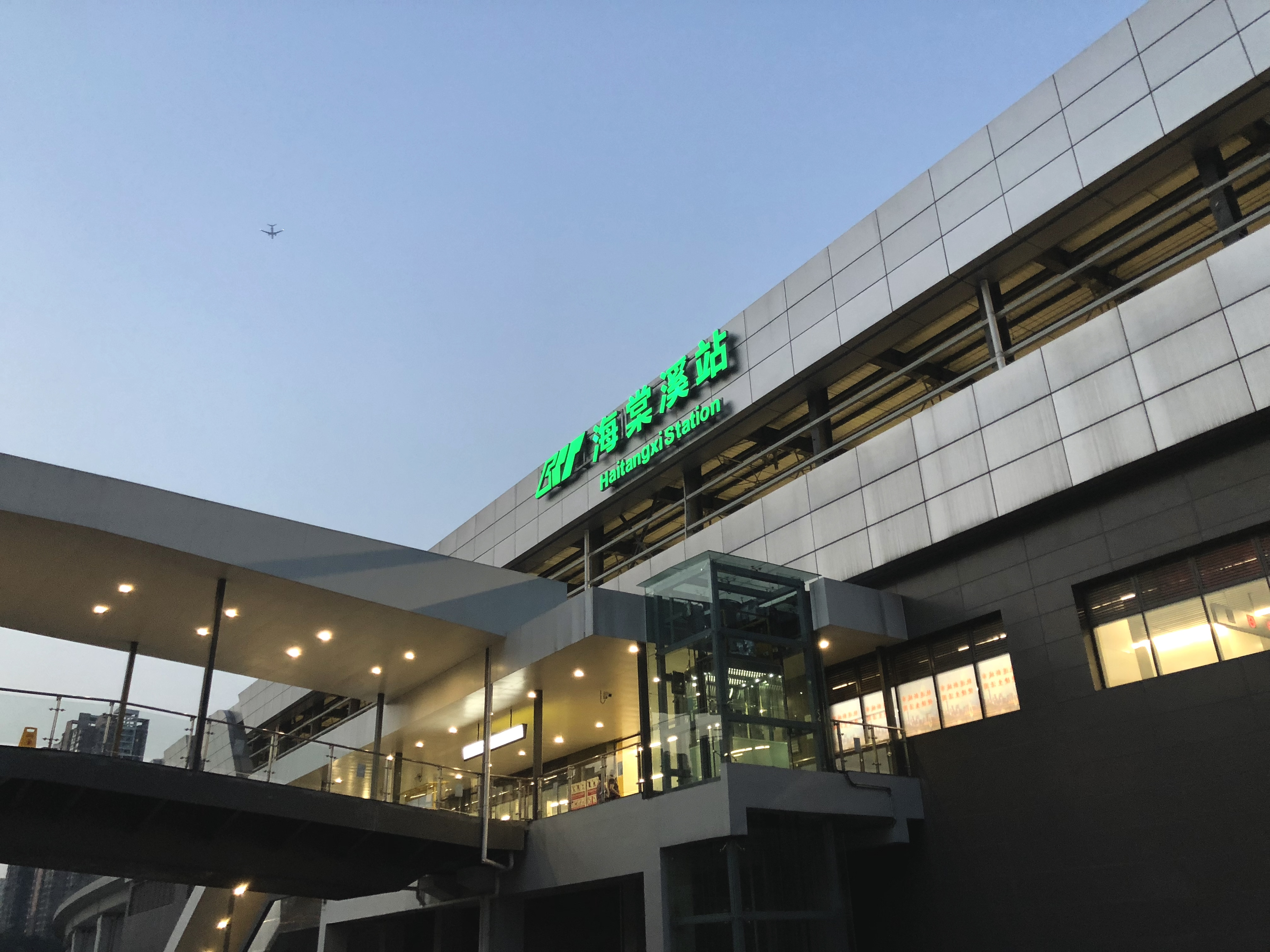
The station itself and its overpass for Exit 2

== Station structure ==
F2		← Loop line counterclockwise loop (Shanghao)
F2	Island platform, doors open on the left
F2		Loop line clockwise loop (Luojiaba) →
F1	Ground level Concourse	Exits, Tickets, Restroom

== Exits ==
There are a total of 3 entrances/exits for the station.

- 1: Nan'an Youngsters Activity Center
- 2A: Yanyu Road, Nan'an Youngsters Activity Center
- 2B: Yanyu Road, Jiangnan Sports Center
