= Nanhu station (Chongqing Rail Transit) =

Chongqing Rail Transit station

Nanhu 南湖
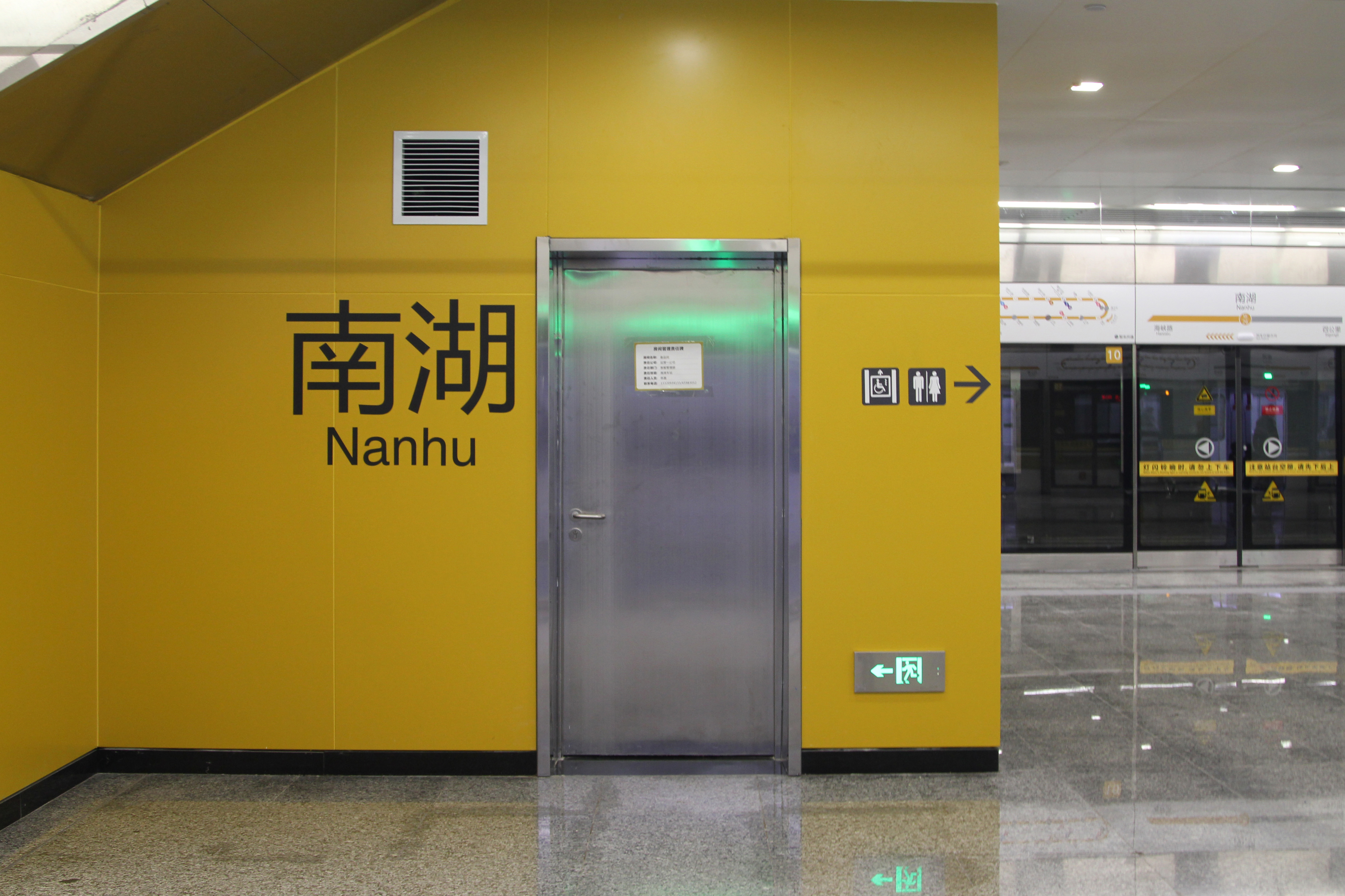

General information
- Location: Chongqing; China
- Coordinates: 29.5192°N 106.5526°E
- Operated by: Chongqing Rail Transit Corp., Ltd
- Lines: Loop line Line 10
- Platforms: 2 (1 island platform)

Construction
- Structure type: Underground

Other information
- Station code: / /

History
- Opened: 28 December 2018; 7 years ago

Services
Preceding station	Chongqing Rail Transit	Following station
Sigongli Counter-clockwise	Loop line	Haixialu Clockwise
Lanhualu Terminus	Line 10	Wanshoulu towards Wangjiazhuang
Location

Nanhu station (Chinese: 南湖站; pinyin: Nánhú Zhàn; lit. 'South Lake station') is a station on Loop line of Chongqing Rail Transit in Chongqing municipality, China. It is located in Nan'an District and opened in 2018. Line 10 reached this station on 30 November 2023.
