= Fengmingshan station =

Chongqing Rail Transit station

Fengmingshan 凤鸣山
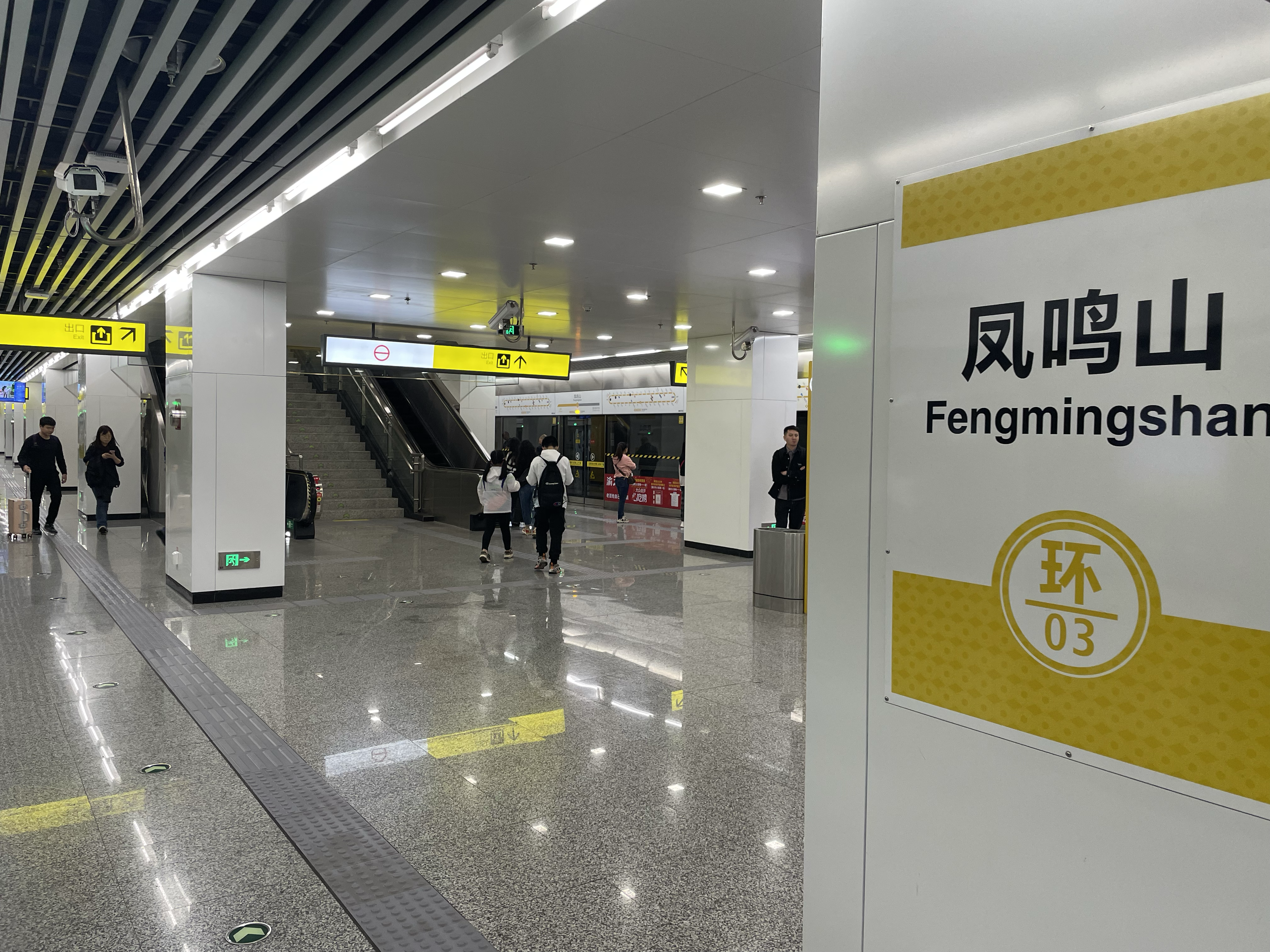
- Fengmingshan station

General information
- Location: Chongqing; China
- Operated by: Chongqing Rail Transit Corp., Ltd
- Line: Loop line
- Platforms: 2 (1 island platform)

Construction
- Structure type: Underground

Other information
- Station code: 环/03

History
- Opened: 20 January 2021; 5 years ago

Services
Preceding station	Chongqing Rail Transit	Following station
Shangqiao Counter-clockwise	Loop line	Chongqing Library Clockwise
Location

Fengmingshan Station is a station on Loop line of Chongqing Rail Transit in Chongqing municipality, China. It is located in Shapingba District and opened in 2021.
