= Nanqiaosi station =

Chongqing Rail Transit station

Nanqiaosi 南桥寺
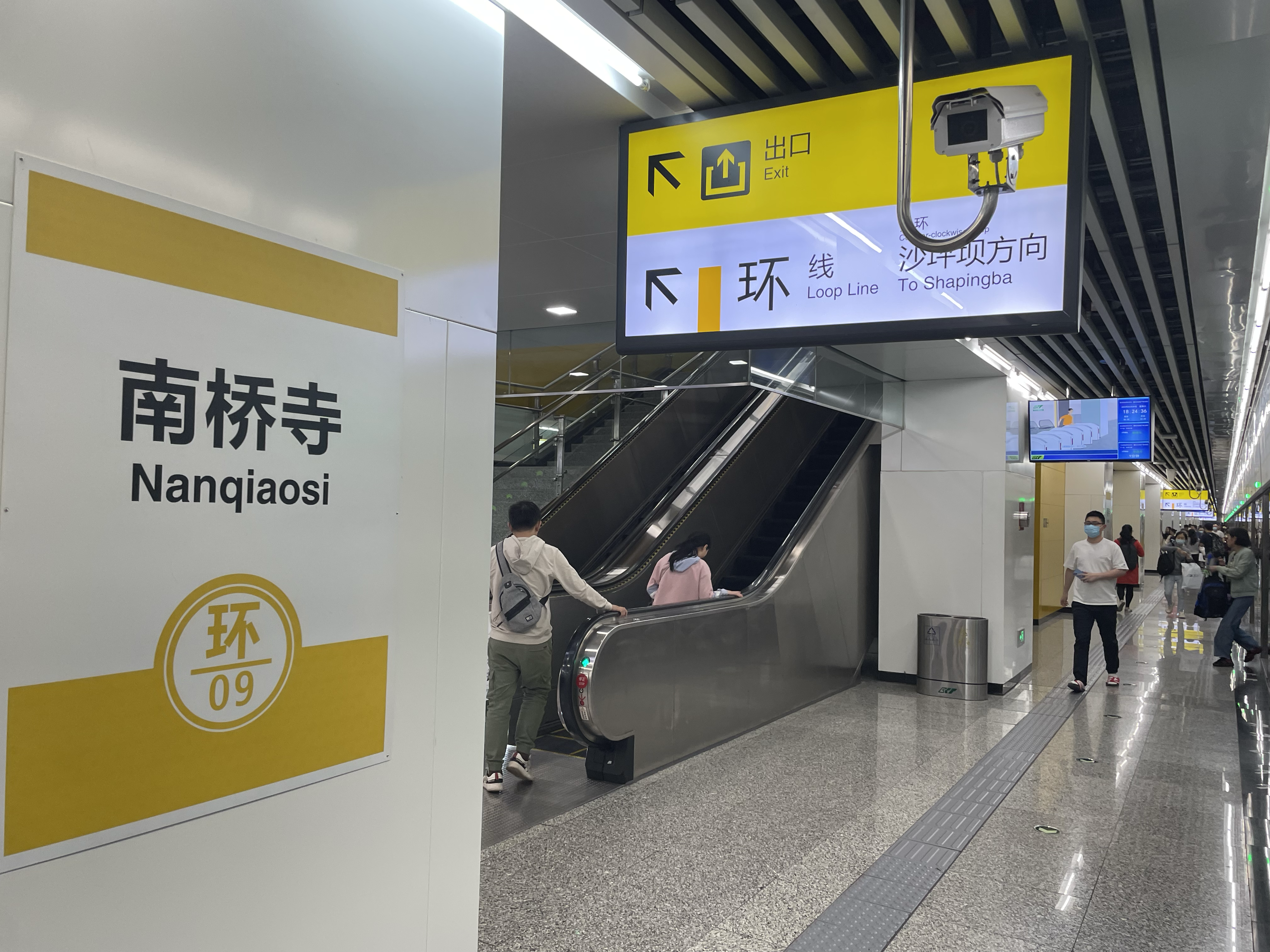
- Nanqiaosi station, April 2023

General information
- Location: Chongqing; China
- Operated by: Chongqing Rail Transit Corp., Ltd
- Line: Loop line
- Platforms: 4 (2 island platforms)

Construction
- Structure type: Underground

Other information
- Station code: 环/09

History
- Opened: 15 December 2019; 6 years ago

Services
Preceding station	Chongqing Rail Transit	Following station
Yudaishan Counter-clockwise	Loop line	Sports Park Clockwise
Location

Nanqiaosi station (Chinese: 南桥寺站; pinyin: Nánqiáosì zhàn) is a station on Loop line of Chongqing Rail Transit in Chongqing municipality, China. It is located in Jiangbei District and opened as an infill station in 2019.

== Station structure ==
There are 2 island platforms at this station, located separately on two floors. On each floor, only one side of the platform is used for local trains to stop, while express trains pass through the other side.

B1	Exits 1, 3, 4
B2; Concourse	Exits 2, 5, Customer service, Vending machines
B3; Platforms	Loop line clockwise loop (Sports Park)
B3; Platforms	Island platform
B3; Platforms	Bypass track for Loop line express trains
B4; Platforms	Loop line counterclockwise loop (Yudaishan)
B4; Platforms	Island platform
B4; Platforms	Bypass track for Loop line express trains
