= Sigongli station =

Metro station in Chongqing, China

Sigongli 四公里
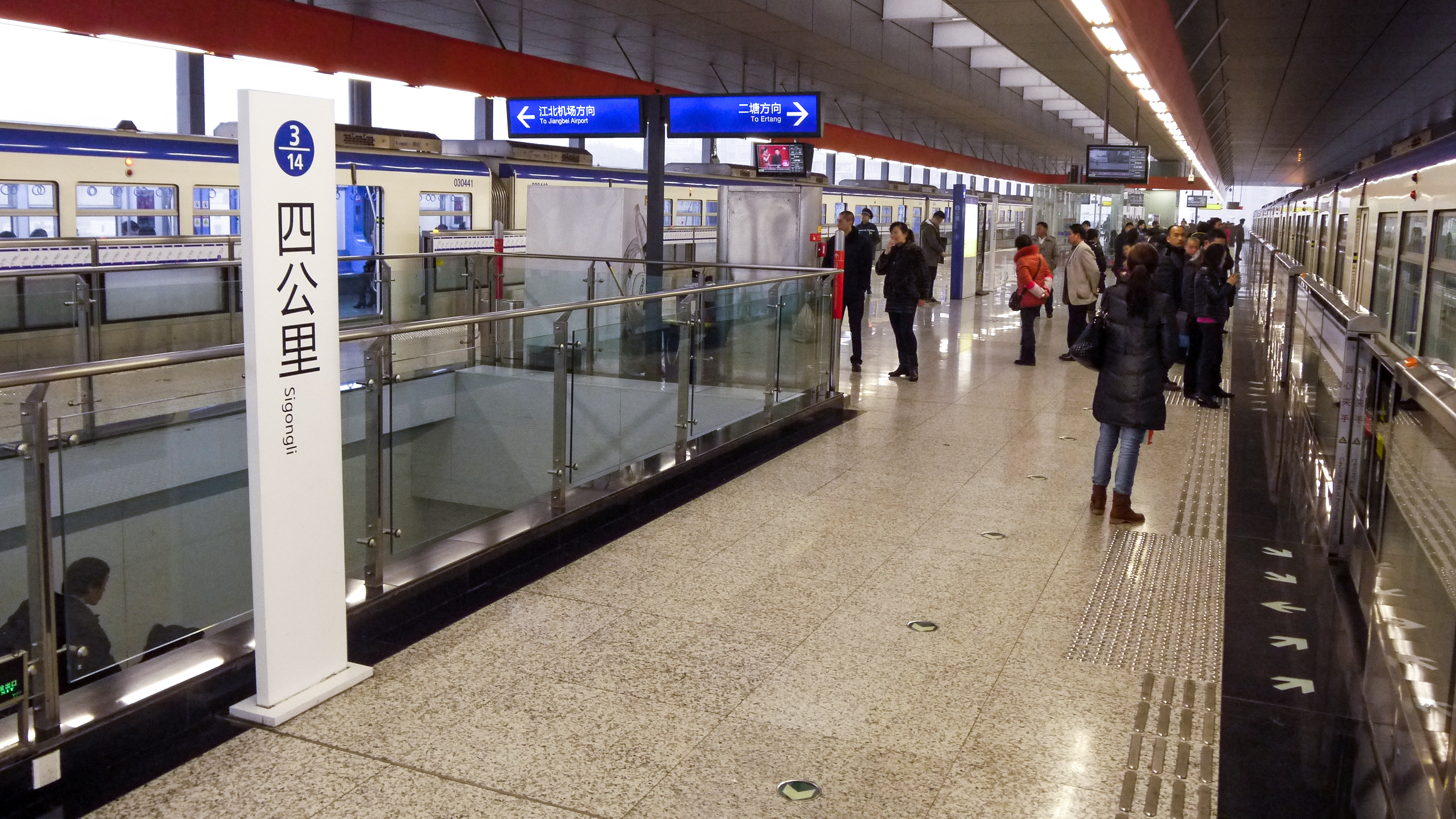
- Line 3 Platform

General information
- Location: Chongqing; China
- Operated by: Chongqing Rail Transit Corp., Ltd
- Lines: Line 3 Loop line
- Platforms: 4 (2 island platforms)
- Connections: Bus

Construction
- Structure type: Elevated and underground
- Accessible: Yes

Other information
- Station code: 环/25, 3/14

History
- Opened: 30 December 2011; 14 years ago (Line 3); 28 December 2018; 7 years ago (Loop Line)

Services
Preceding station	Chongqing Rail Transit	Following station
Chongqing Technology and Business University towards Yudong	Line 3	Nanping towards Terminal 2 of Jiangbei Airport
Luojiaba Counter-clockwise	Loop line	Nanhu Clockwise
Location

Sigongli station (Chinese: 四公里站; pinyin: Sìgōnglǐ zhàn) is an interchange station on the Loop Line (heavy rail subway) and Line 3 (straddle beam monorail) of Chongqing Rail Transit in Chongqing Municipality, China. It is located in Nan'an District. It opened on 30 December 2011 with Line 3 and was expanded on 28 December 2018 with the Loop Line section of the station.

== Station structure ==
=== Line 3 ===
An island platform is used for Line 3 trains travelling in both directions.

3F; Platforms	Line 3 to Yudong (Chongqing Technology and Business University)
3F; Platforms	Island platform
3F; Platforms	Line 3 to Terminal 2 of Jiangbei Airport (Nanping)
2F; Concourse	Transfer passage to Loop line
1F; Concourse	Exits 1-4, Customer service, Vending machines, Toilets

=== Loop line ===
An island platform is used for Loop line trains travelling in both directions.

2F; Concourse	Exits 5-7, Customer service, Vending machines, Transfer passage to Line 3
1F; Platforms	Loop line clockwise loop (Nanhu)
1F; Platforms	Island platform
1F; Platforms	Loop line counterclockwise loop (Luojiaba)
