= Shangqiao station =

Chongqing Rail Transit station

Shangqiao 上桥
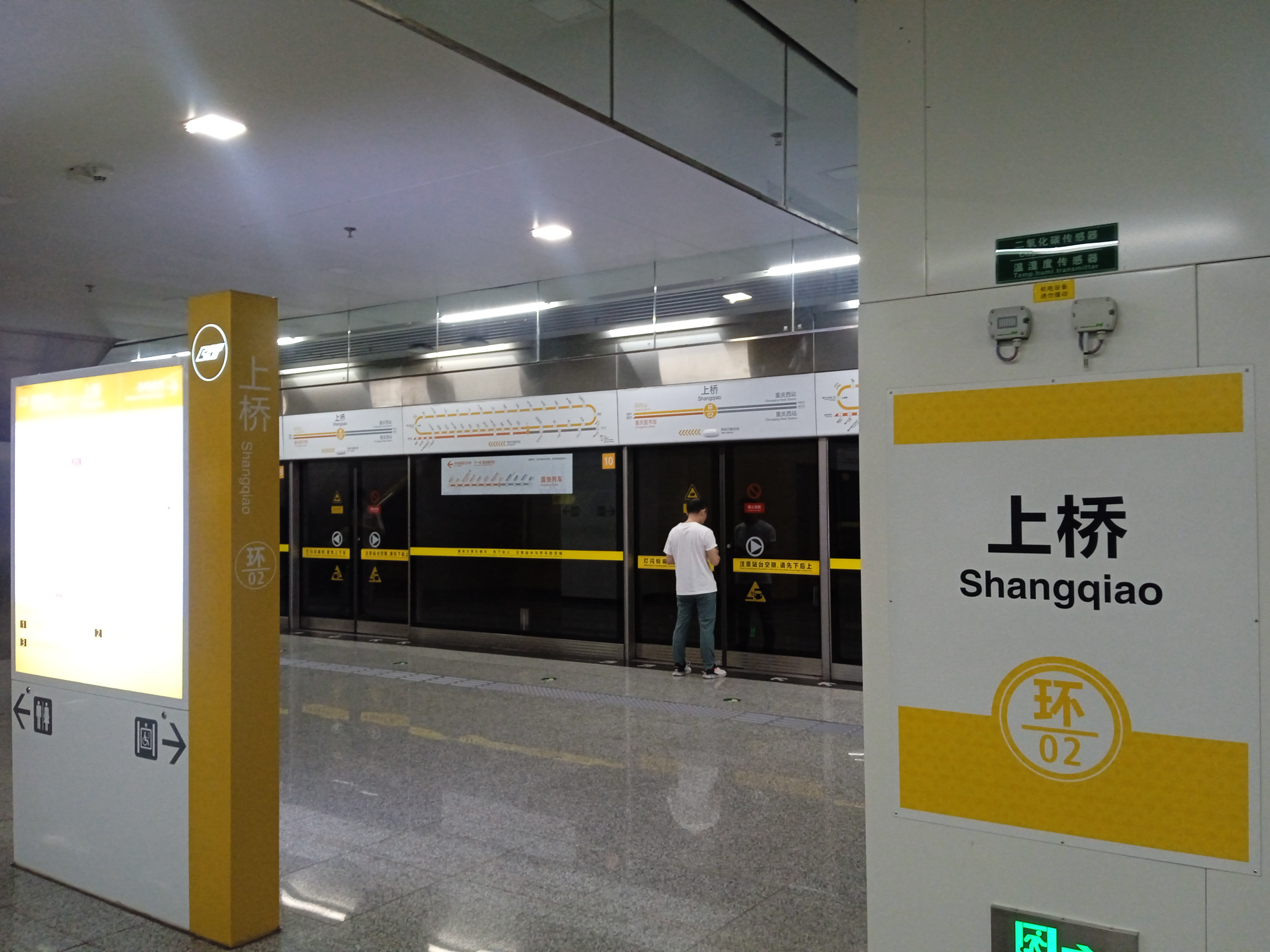
- Platform

General information
- Location: Chongqing; China
- Coordinates: 29.5207°N 106.4387°E
- Operated by: Chongqing Rail Transit Corp., Ltd
- Line: Loop line
- Platforms: 2 (1 island platform)

Construction
- Structure type: Underground

Other information
- Station code: 环/02

History
- Opened: 20 January 2021; 5 years ago1

Services
Preceding station	Chongqing Rail Transit	Following station
Chongqing West Station Counter-clockwise	Loop line	Fengmingshan Clockwise
Chongqing West Station towards Tiaodeng	Loop line Express	Chongqing Library towards Tangjiatuo
Location

Shangqiao Station is a station on Loop line of Chongqing Rail Transit in Chongqing municipality, China. It is located in Shapingba District and opened in 2021.
