= Yudaishan station =

Metro station in Chongqing, China

Coordinates: 29°35′00″N 106°28′20″E

Yudaishan 玉带山
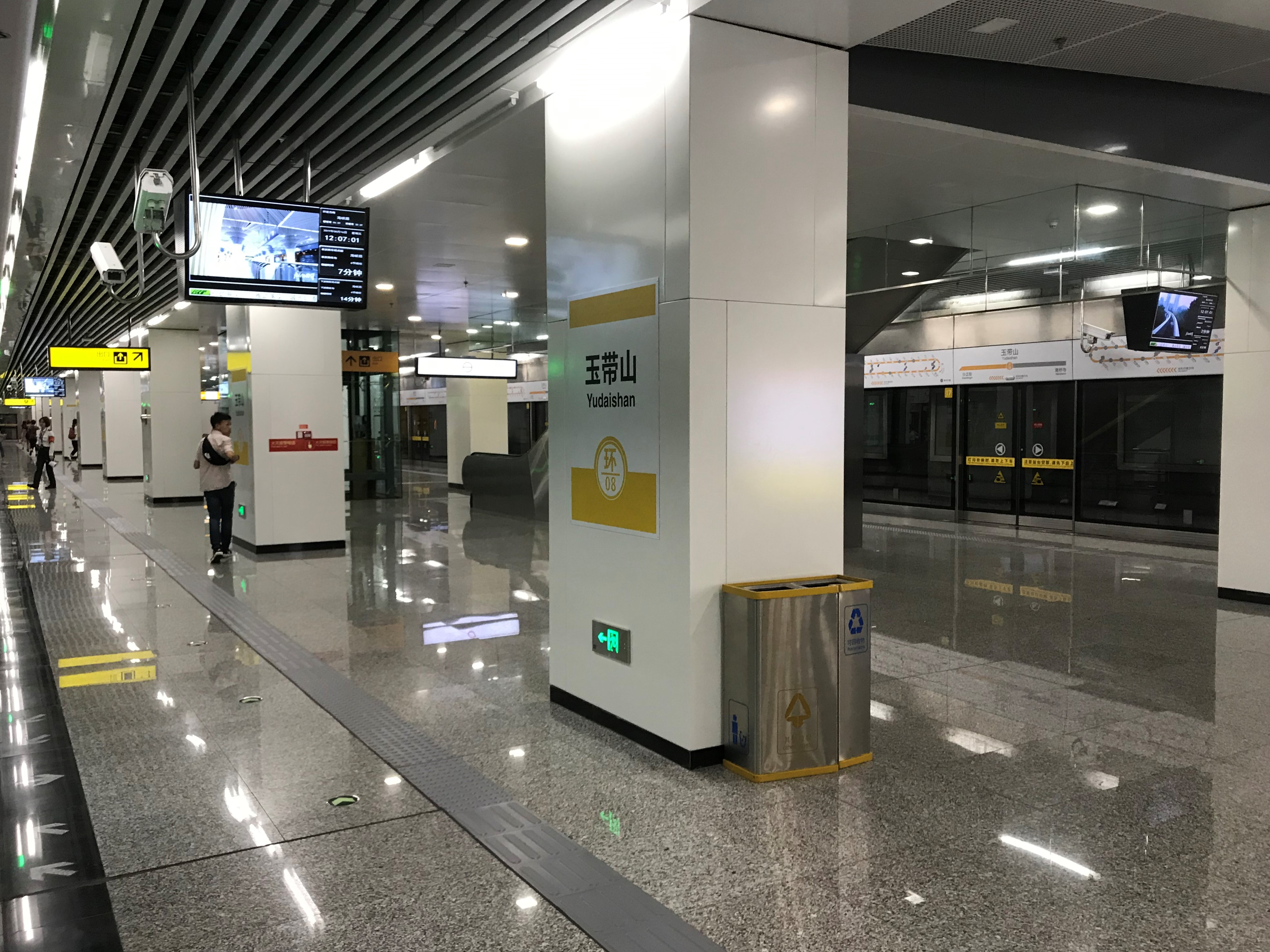
- Loop line platform

General information
- Location: Songshi Avenue (松石大道); Liangjiang New Area, Chongqing; China
- Operated by: Chongqing Rail Transit Corp., Ltd
- Lines: Loop line Line 4
- Platforms: 4 (1 island platform and 2 side platforms)

Construction
- Structure type: Underground

Other information
- Station code: / /

History
- Opened: 28 December 2018 (Loop line); 11 February 2026 (Line 4)

Services
Preceding station	Chongqing Rail Transit	Following station
Chongqing University Counter-clockwise	Loop line	Nanqiaosi Clockwise
Shimahelijiao Terminus	Line 4	Panxi towards Huangling
Location

Yudaishan Station is a station on Loop line and Line 4 of Chongqing Rail Transit in Chongqing municipality, China. It is located in Liangjiang New Area.
