= Xiaolongkan station =

Metro station in Chongqing, China

Xiaolongkan 小龙坎
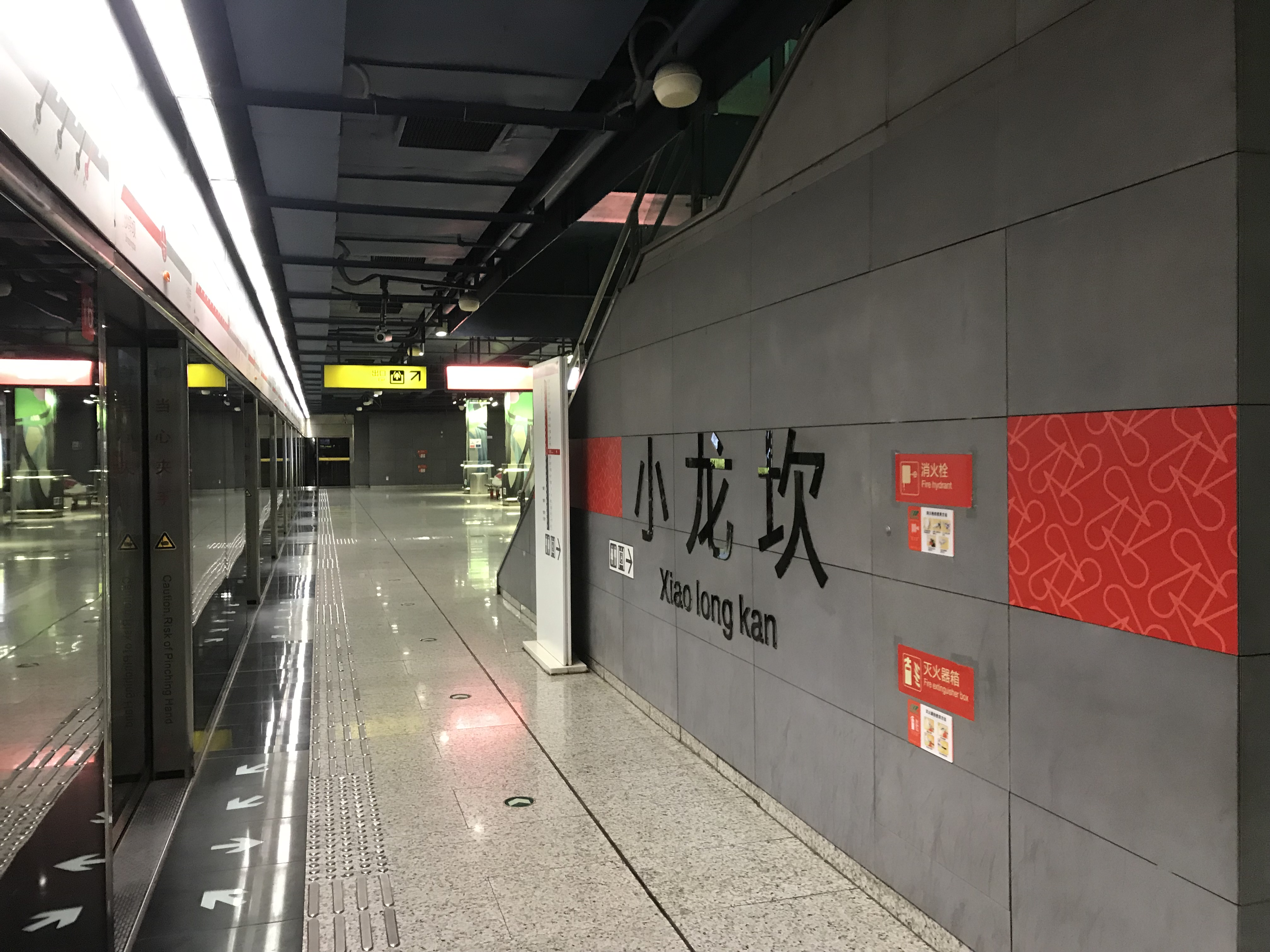
- Platform of Line 1

Chinese name
- Traditional Chinese: 小龍坎
- Simplified Chinese: 小龙坎
- Hanyu Pinyin: Xiǎolóngkǎn
- Literal meaning: 'Little Dragon Ridge'
Transcriptions
Standard Mandarin
- Hanyu Pinyin: Xiǎolóngkǎn
- Wade–Giles: Hsiao^{3}-lung^{2}-k‘an^{3}
- IPA: [ɕjàʊ.lʊ̌ŋ.kʰàn]
Yue: Cantonese
- Yale Romanization: Síulùhnghám
- Jyutping: siu2 lung4 ham2
- IPA: [siw˧˥.lʊŋ˩.hɐm˧˥]

General information
- Location: Shapingba District, Chongqing; China
- Coordinates: 29.556197°N 106.464434°E
- Operated by: Chongqing Rail Transit Corp., Ltd
- Lines: Line 1 Line 9
- Platforms: 4 (2 island platforms)

Construction
- Structure type: Underground

Other information
- Station code: / /

History
- Opened: 28 July 2011; 14 years ago (Line 1); 25 January 2022; 4 years ago (Line 9)

Services
Preceding station	Chongqing Rail Transit	Following station
Majiayan towards Chaotianmen	Line 1	Shapingba towards Bishan
Shapingba towards Gaotanyan	Line 9	Tuwan towards Huashigou
Location

Xiaolongkan is a station on Line 1 and Line 9 of Chongqing Rail Transit in Shapingba District, Chongqing Municipality, China. It opened in 2011.

== Station structure ==
=== Line 1 ===
B1; Concourse	Exits 1-4, Customer service, Vending machines, Transfer passage to Line 9
B2; Platforms	Line 1 to Bishan (Shapingba)
B2; Platforms	Island platform
B2; Platforms	Line 1 to Chaotianmen (Majiayan)

=== Line 9 ===
B1; Concourse	Exits 5-7, Customer service, Vending machines, Transfer passage to Line 1
B2; Platforms	Line 9 to Gaotanyan (Shapingba)
B2; Platforms	Island platform
B2; Platforms	Line 9 to Huashigou (Tuwan)
