= Shapingba station =

Metro station in Chongqing, China

Shapingba 沙坪坝
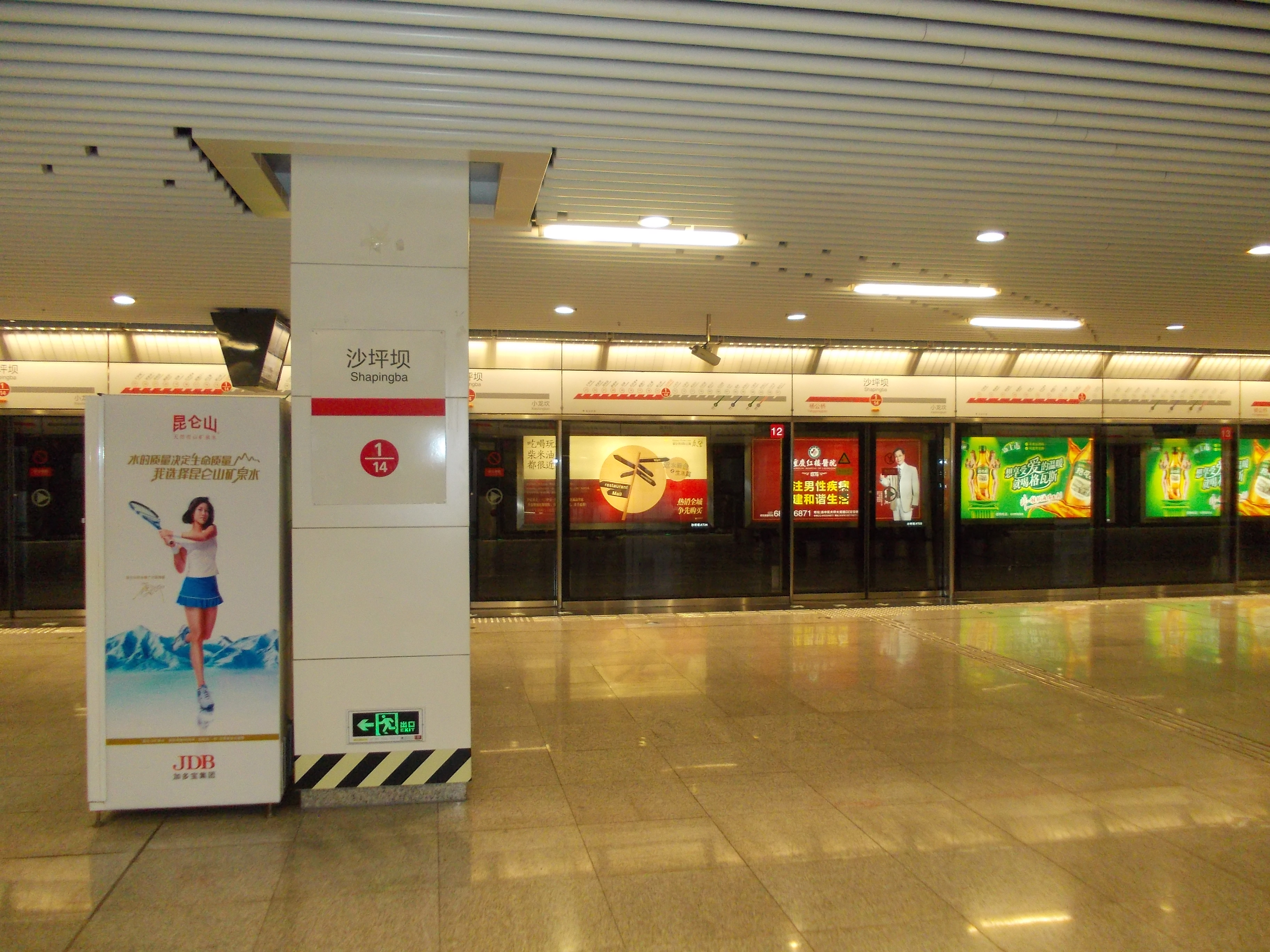
- Platform of Line 1

General information
- Location: Shapingba District, Chongqing; China
- Coordinates: 29.55852°N 106.45557°E
- Operated by: Chongqing Rail Transit Corp., Ltd
- Lines: Line 1 Line 9 Loop line
- Platforms: 6 (3 island platforms)

Construction
- Structure type: Underground

Other information
- Station code: / / /

History
- Opened: 28 July 2011; 14 years ago (Line 1); 28 December 2018; 7 years ago (Loop Line); 25 January 2022; 4 years ago (Line 9)

Services
Preceding station	Chongqing Rail Transit	Following station
Xiaolongkan towards Chaotianmen	Line 1	Yanggongqiao towards Bishan
Tianlilu towards Gaotanyan	Line 9	Xiaolongkan towards Huashigou
Tianxingqiao Counter-clockwise	Loop line	Chongqing University Clockwise
Chongqing Library towards Tiaodeng	Loop line Express	Ranjiaba towards Tangjiatuo
Location

Shapingba is a metro station of the Chongqing Rail Transit system in Shapingba District, Chongqing Municipality, China. The station began service on 28 July 2011 with the opening of Line 1 of Chongqing Rail Transit. Until the extension to Daxuecheng was completed and opened in 2012, it operated as the terminus of Line 1. It later was expanded to accommodate two extra metro lines to the south of the Line 1 metro station, to serve the Loop Line (opened on 28 December 2018) and Line 9 (opened on 25 January 2022), but the transfer passage didn't open until 30 September 2022. Line 27, which is currently under construction, will also serve the station in future.

It also interchanges with the renovated Shapingba railway station, as an Integrated Transport Hub, with connected bus and taxi modes.

== Station structure ==
=== Line 1 ===
The station serves as the 14th station on the East-West running Line 1. This is an underground station on two levels. The first underground level is for the station hall & ticketing, beneath which is the platform level. The station set up to serve 2 tracks from a single island platform.

B1; Concourse	Exits 1-3, Customer service, Vending machines, Transfer passage to Line 9 and Loop line
B2; Platforms	Line 1 to Bishan (Yanggongqiao)
B2; Platforms	Island platform
B2; Platforms	Line 1 to Chaotianmen (Xiaolongkan)

=== Line 9 ===
Shapingba is the 4th station on this line which runs from the Southwest to the Northeast of the city.

B1; Concourse	Exits 3, 5, 7, 8, Customer service, Vending machines, Transfer passage to Line 1 and Loop line
B2; Platforms	Line 9 to Gaotanyan (Tianlilu)
B2; Platforms	Island platform
B2; Platforms	Line 9 to Huashigou (Xiaolongkan)

=== Loop line ===
This is a circular metro line.

B2; Concourse	Exits 4-6, Customer service, Vending machines, Transfer passage to Line 1 and Line 9
B3; Platforms	Loop line counterclockwise loop (Tianxingqiao)
B3; Platforms	Island platform
B3; Platforms	Loop line clockwise loop (Chongqing University)

== Station exits ==
- Exit 1: Chongqing Normal University (Shapingba Campus), Chongqing Nankai Middle School
- Exit 2: Sanxia Square Pedestrian Street
- Exit 3: Shapingba railway station, Chongqing VIII Middle School

== Near the station ==
- Chongqing Normal University (Shapingba campus)
- Chongqing First Secondary School
- Chongqing Nankai High School
- Chongqing VIII Secondary School
- Chongqing Shu Shu Primary School
- Chongqing Shapingba District People's Hospital
- Shapingba District Cultural Museum
- Sanxia Square Pedestrian Street
- Shapingba railway station
- Sanxia Square Underground Commercial Street
