= Haixialu station =

Chongqing Rail Transit station

Haixialu 海峡路
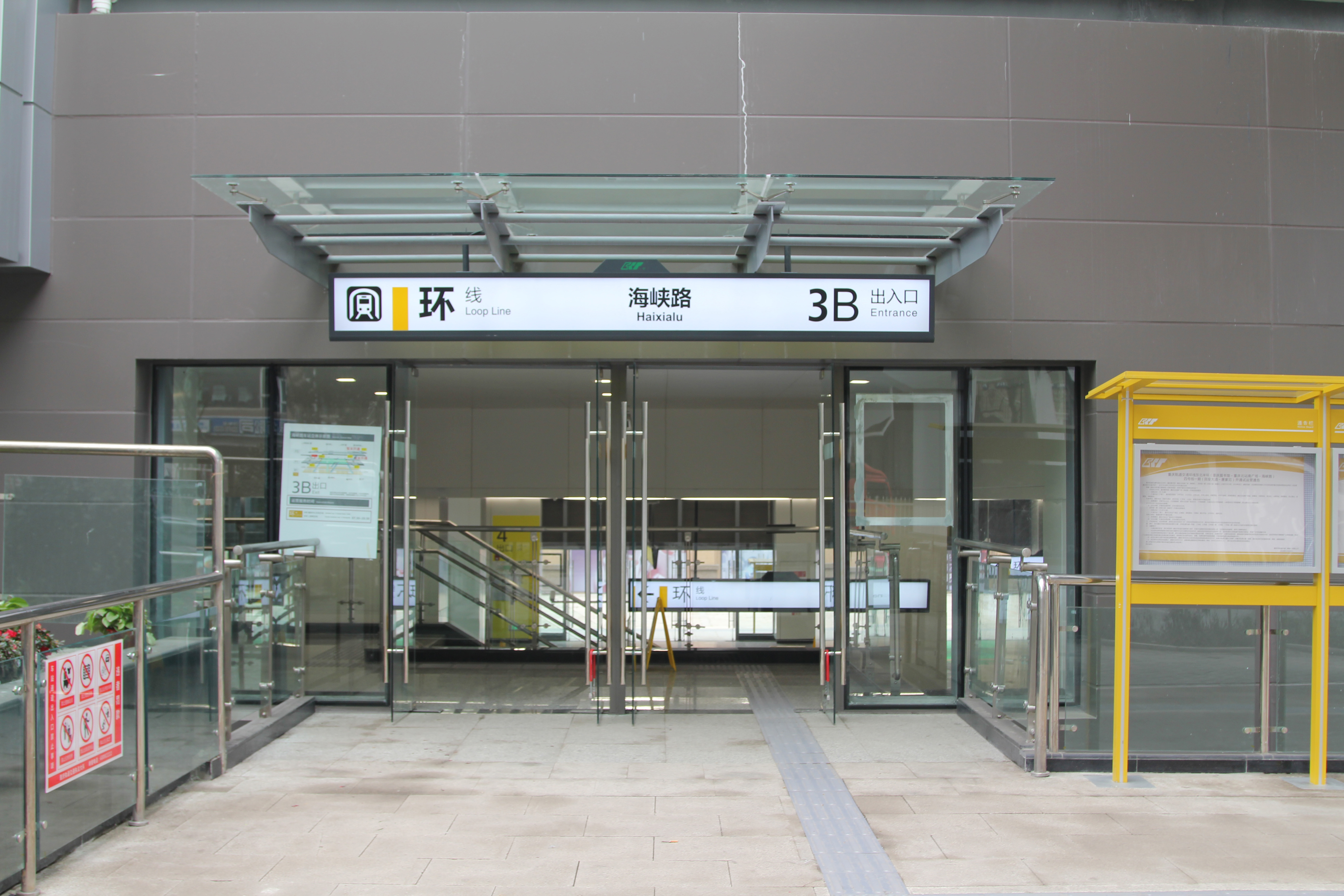

General information
- Location: Chongqing; China
- Operated by: Chongqing Rail Transit Corp., Ltd
- Line: Loop line
- Platforms: 2 side platforms

Construction
- Structure type: At-grade and underground

Other information
- Station code: 环/27

History
- Opened: 28 December 2018; 7 years ago

Services
Preceding station	Chongqing Rail Transit	Following station
Nanhu Counter-clockwise	Loop line	Xiejiawan Clockwise
Location

Haixialu station (Chinese: 海峡路站; pinyin: Hǎixiálù zhàn; lit. 'Haixia Road station') is a station on Loop line of Chongqing Rail Transit in Chongqing municipality, China. It is located in Nan'an District, Chongqing, and opened in 2018.
