= Chongqing Library station =

Metro station in Chongqing, China

Chongqing Library 重庆图书馆
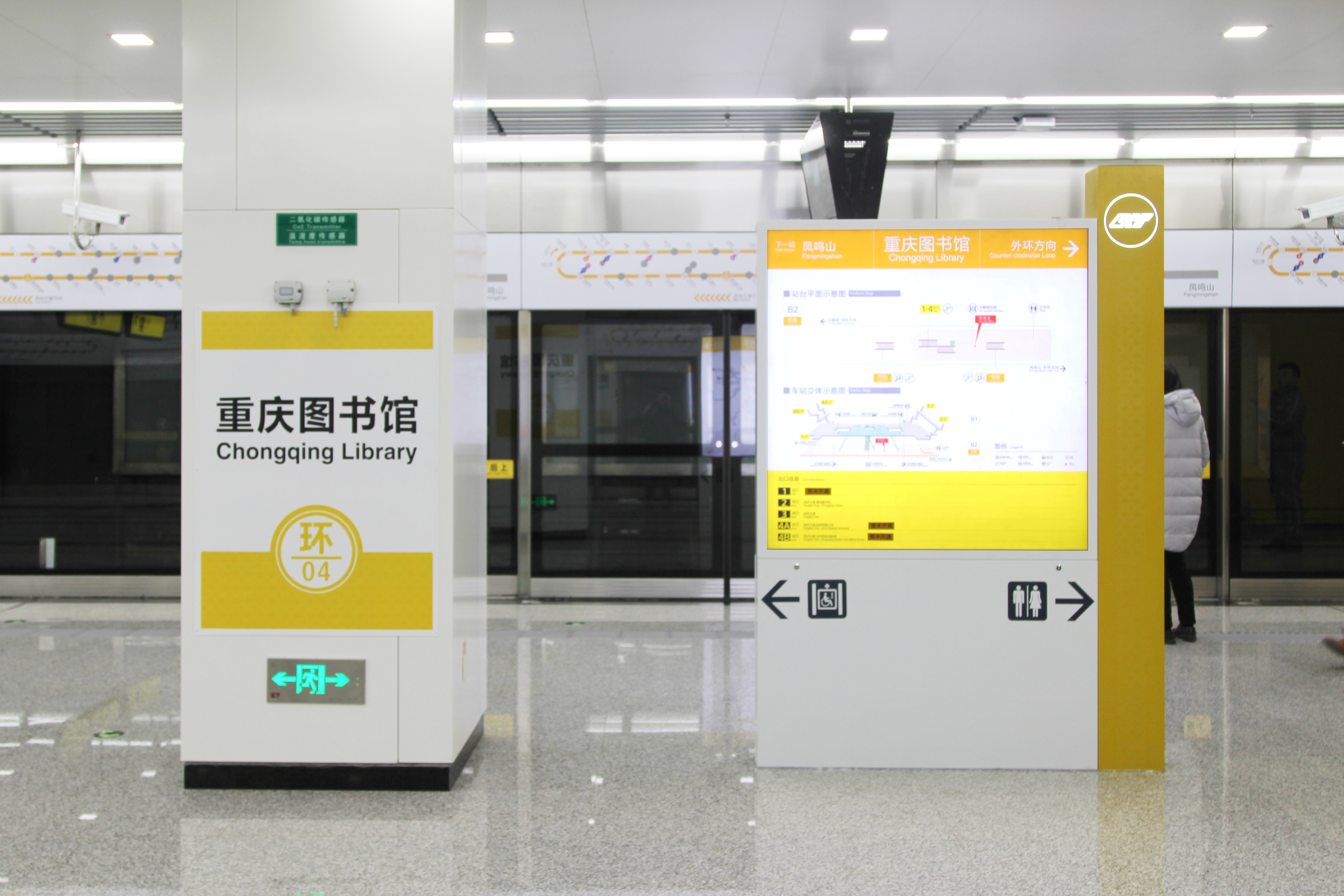
- Platform

Chinese name
- Simplified Chinese: 重庆图书馆站
- Traditional Chinese: 重慶圖書館站
Transcriptions
Standard Mandarin
- Hanyu Pinyin: Chóngqìng Túshūguǎn Zhàn

General information
- Location: Fengtian Avenue (凤天大道); Shapingba District, Chongqing; China
- Coordinates: 29°32′05″N 106°27′06″E
- System: Chongqing Rail Transit
- Operator: Chongqing Rail Transit Operation Co., Ltd.
- Line: Loop line
- Platforms: 2 (1 island platform)
- Tracks: 2

Construction
- Structure type: Underground
- Accessible: Yes

Other information
- Station code: /

History
- Opened: 28 December 2018; 7 years ago

Services
| Preceding station | Chongqing Rail Transit | Following station |
|---|---|---|
| Fengmingshan Counter-clockwise | Loop line | Tianxingqiao Clockwise |
| Shangqiao towards Tiaodeng | Loop line Express | Shapingba towards Tangjiatuo |
Location

Chongqing Library (Chinese: 重庆图书馆站) is a metro station on Loop Line of Chongqing Rail Transit in Chongqing Municipality, China. It is located in the Shapingba District. The original name of the station was Fengtianlu. It opened in 2018. Until the remaining section opened in January 2021, it served as the terminus of Loop Line in Phase I.

== Station structure ==
| B1 | Concourse | Customer service, Vending machines |
| B2 | | Loop line counterclockwise loop (Fengmingshan) |
| B2 | Island platform |
| B2 | | Loop line clockwise loop (Tianxingqiao) |

=== Entrances/exits ===
- 1: Fengtian Avenue
- 2: Fengtian Avenue, Chongqing Library
- 3: Fengtian Avenue
- 4B: Fengtian Avenue
