= Minxinjiayuan station =

Chongqing Rail Transit station

Minxinjiayuan 民心佳园
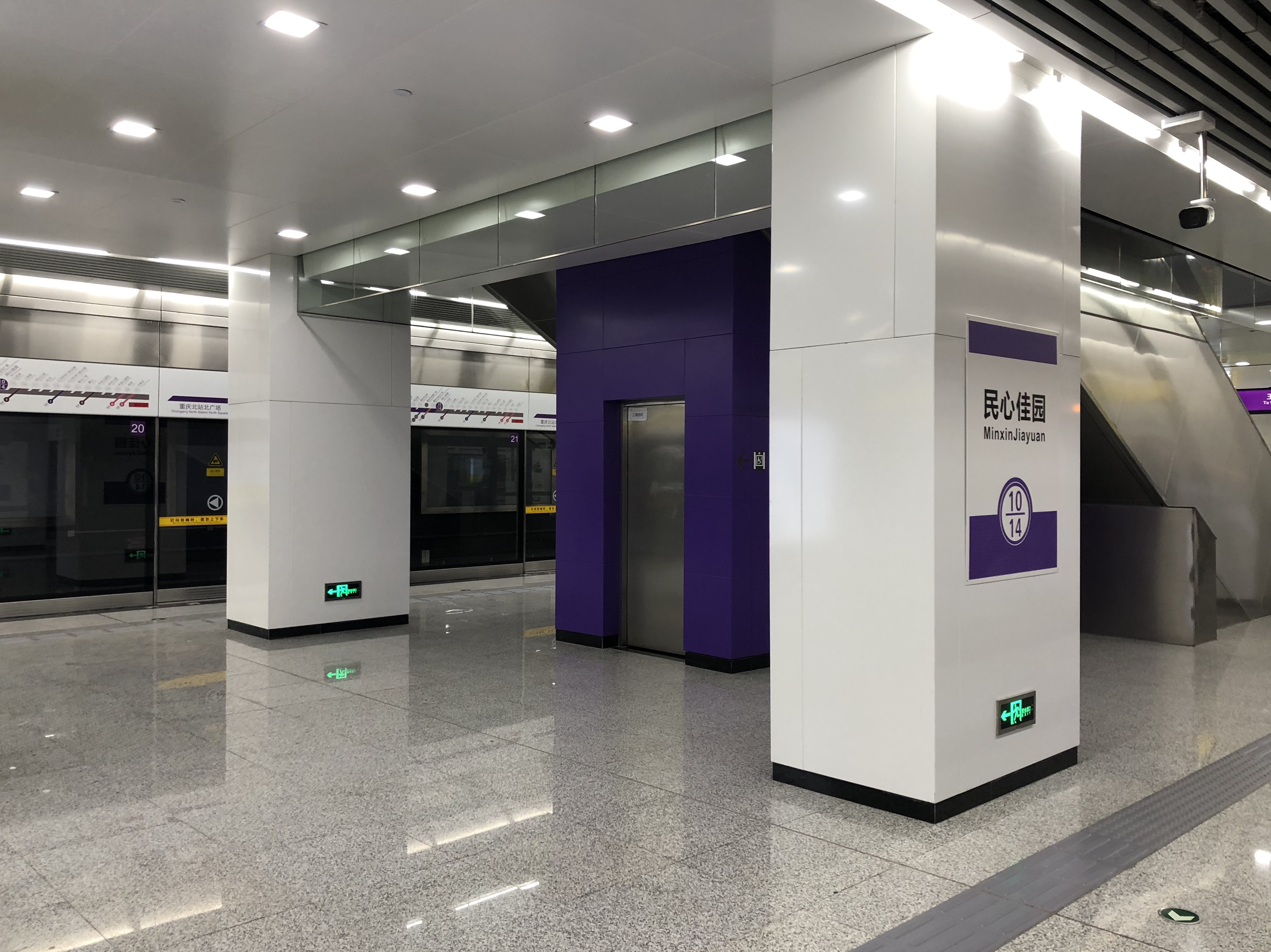

General information
- Location: Chongqing; China
- Coordinates: 29.6295°N 106.5640°E
- Operator: Chongqing Rail Transit Corp., Ltd
- Line: Line 10

Construction
- Structure type: Underground

Other information
- Station code: 10/14

History
- Opened: 28 December 2017; 8 years ago

Services
Preceding station	Chongqing Rail Transit	Following station
Chongqing North Station North Square towards Lanhualu	Line 10	Sanyawan towards Wangjiazhuang
Location

Minxinjiayuan station is a station on Line 10 of Chongqing Rail Transit in Chongqing municipality, China. It is located in Yubei District and opened in 2017.
