= Chongqing North Station North Square station =

Metro station in Chongqing, China

Chongqing North Station North Square 重庆北站北广场
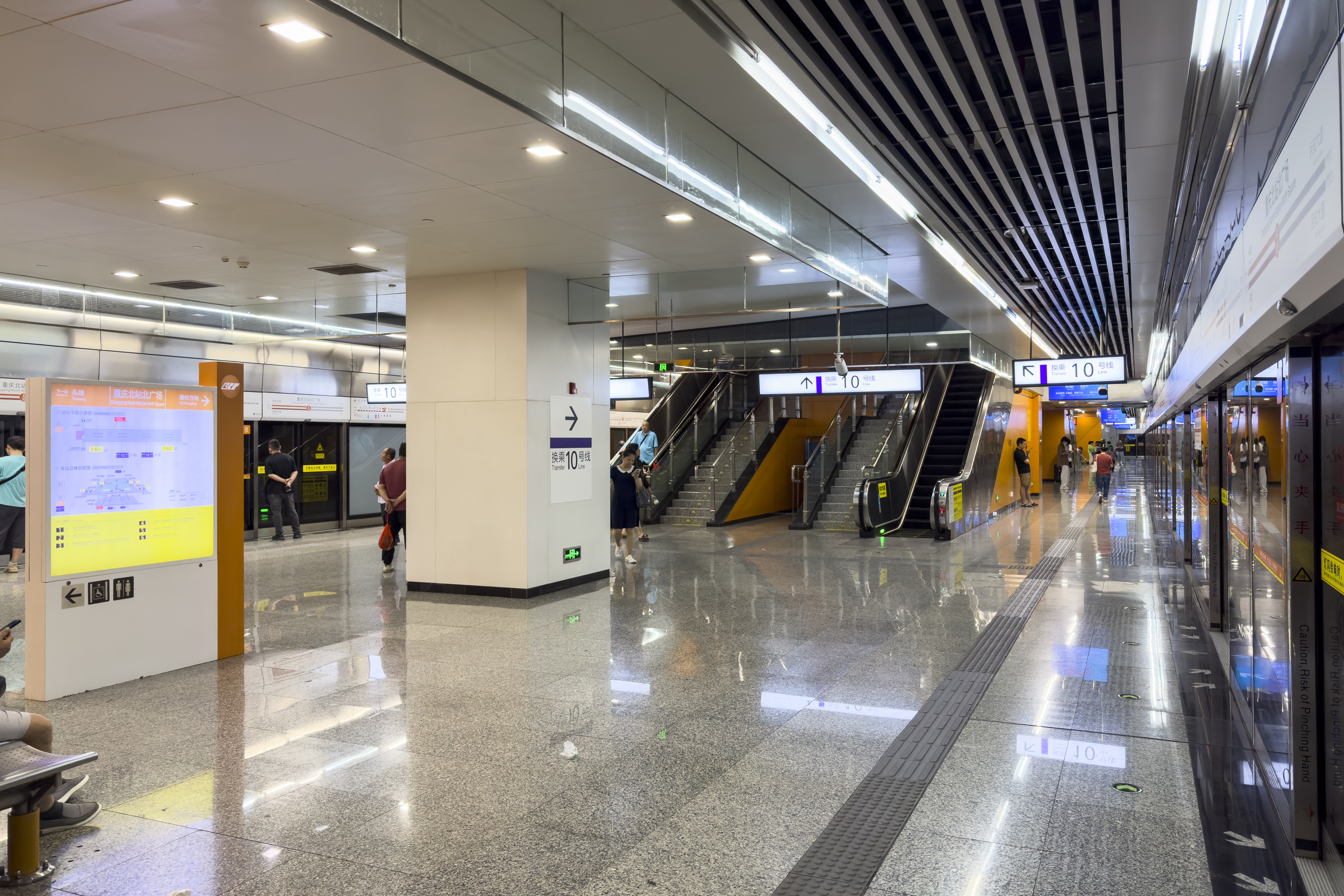
- Platform of Line 4

Chinese name
- Simplified Chinese: 重庆北站北广场站
- Traditional Chinese: 重慶北站北廣場站
Transcriptions
Standard Mandarin
- Hanyu Pinyin: Chóngqìng Běizhàn Běiguǎngchǎng Zhàn

General information
- Location: North square of Chongqing North railway station Liangjiang New Area, Chongqing; China
- Coordinates: 29°36′53.9″N 106°32′50.5″E
- System: Chongqing Rail Transit
- Operator: Chongqing Rail Transit Operation Co., Ltd.
- Lines: Line 4 Line 10
- Platforms: 4 (2 island platforms)
- Tracks: 4
- Connections: Chongqing North

Construction
- Structure type: Underground
- Platform levels: 2
- Accessible: Yes

Other information
- Station code: / /

History
- Opened: 28 December 2017 (Line 10); 28 December 2018 (Line 4)

Services
Preceding station	Chongqing Rail Transit	Following station
Min'an Ave. towards Shimahelijiao	Line 4	Toutang towards Huangling
Min'an Ave. towards Tiaodeng	Line 4 Express	Toutang towards Tangjiatuo
Chongqing N. Station S. Square towards Lanhualu	Line 10	Minxinjiayuan towards Wangjiazhuang
Chongqing N. Station S. Square towards Lanhualu	Line 10 Rapid	Terminal 3 of Jiangbei Airport towards Wangjiazhuang
Location

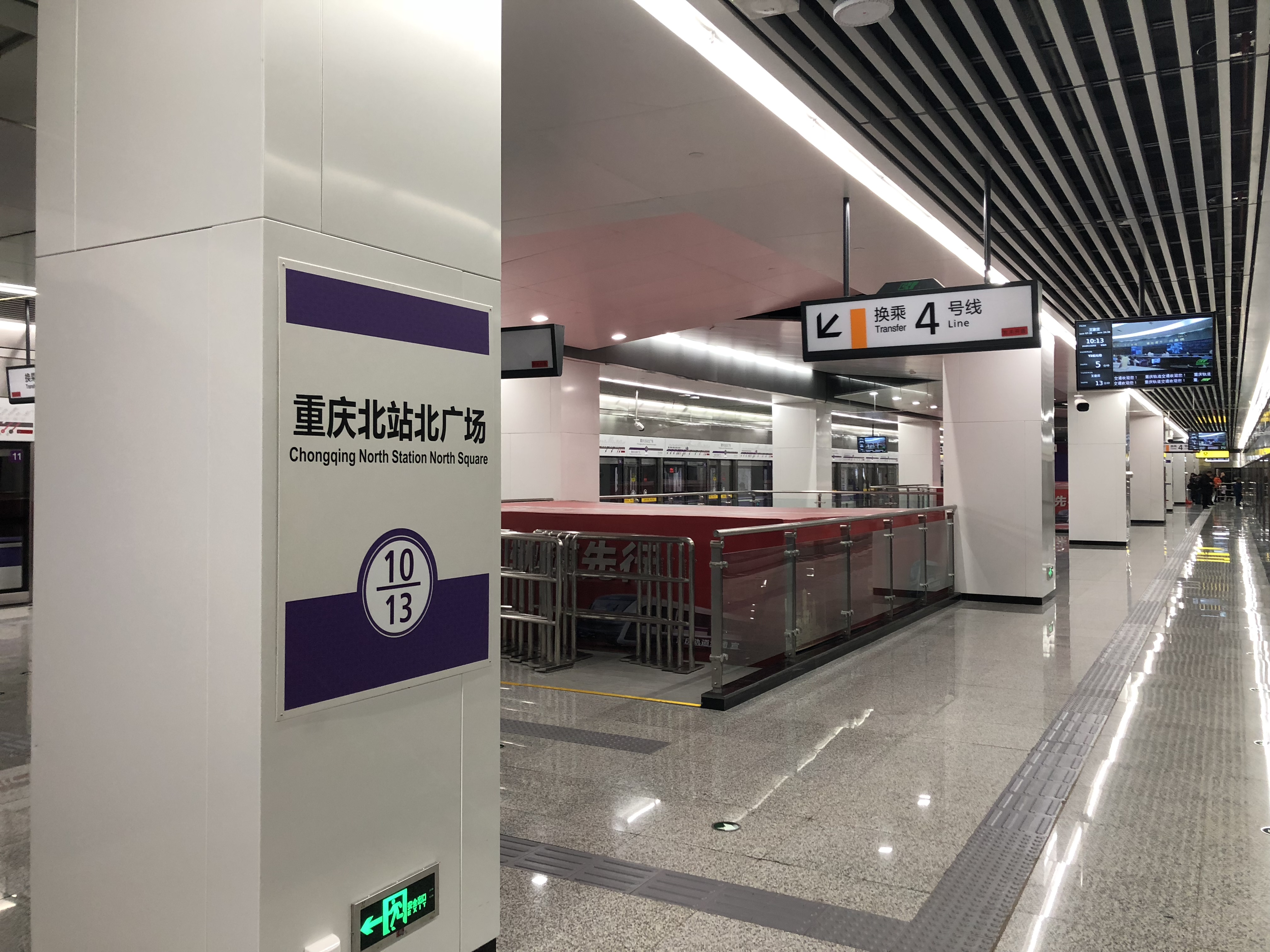
Platform of Line 10

Chongqing North Station North Square (Chinese: 重庆北站北广场) is an interchange station on Line 4 and Line 10 of Chongqing Rail Transit. Located in Chongqing's Liangjiang New Area, it serves the nearby Chongqing North railway station.

It opened on December 28, 2017, with the opening of the first phase of Line 10. On December 28, 2018, it became an interchange station with the opening of Line 4.

== Station structure ==
B3	Concourse	Customer service, Vending machines
B4		Line 10 to Lanhualu (Chongqing North Station South Square)
B4	Island platform
B4		Line 10 to Wangjiazhuang (Minxinjiayuan)
B5		Line 4 to Shimahelijiao (Min'an Ave.)
B5	Island platform
B5		Line 4 to Huangling (Toutang)
