= Sanyawan station =

Chongqing Rail Transit station

Sanyawan 三亚湾
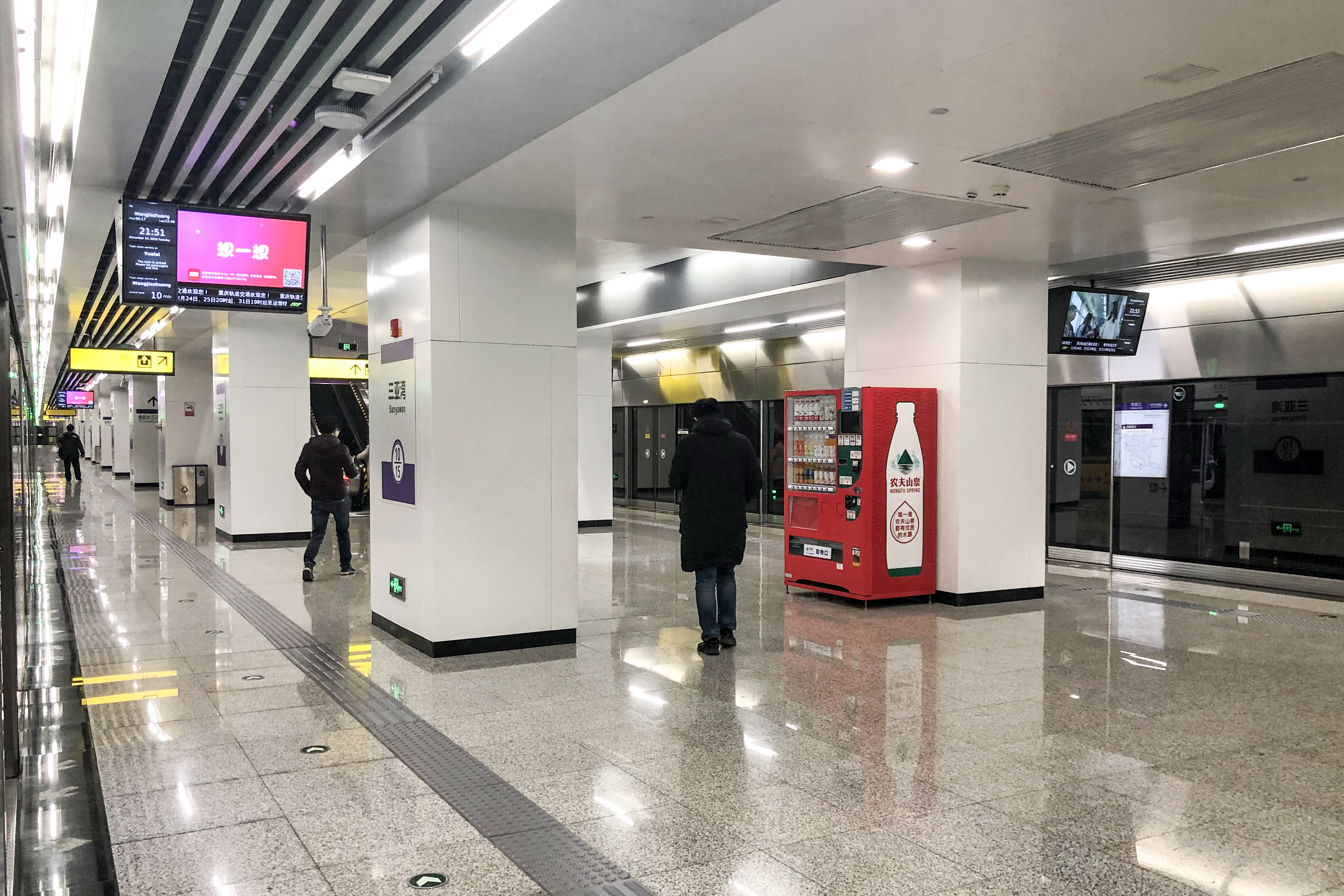

General information
- Location: Chongqing; China
- Operator: Chongqing Rail Transit Corp., Ltd
- Line: Line 10
- Platforms: 4 (2 island platforms)

Construction
- Structure type: Underground

Other information
- Station code: 10/15

History
- Opened: 28 December 2017; 8 years ago

Services
| Preceding station | Chongqing Rail Transit | Following station |
|---|---|---|
| Minxinjiayuan towards Lanhualu | Line 10 | Shangwanlu towards Wangjiazhuang |
Location

Sanyawan station is a station on Line 10 of Chongqing Rail Transit in Chongqing municipality, China. It is located in Yubei District and opened in 2017.

== Station structure ==
There are 2 island platforms at this station, located separately on two floors. On each floor, only one side of the platforms is used for Local trains to stop, while the other side is used for Rapid trains to pass through.

| B1 | Exits 1-3, 8 |
| B2; Concourse | Exits 4-7, 9, Customer service, Vending machines |
| B3; Platforms | Bypass track for Line 10 rapid trains |
| B3; Platforms | Island platform |
| B3; Platforms | Line 10 to Lanhualu (Minxinjiayuan) |
| B4; Platforms | Line 10 to Wangjiazhuang (Shangwanlu) |
| B4; Platforms | Island platform |
| B4; Platforms | Bypass track for Line 10 rapid trains |
