= Yubei Square station =

Chongqing Rail Transit station

Yubei Square 渝北广场
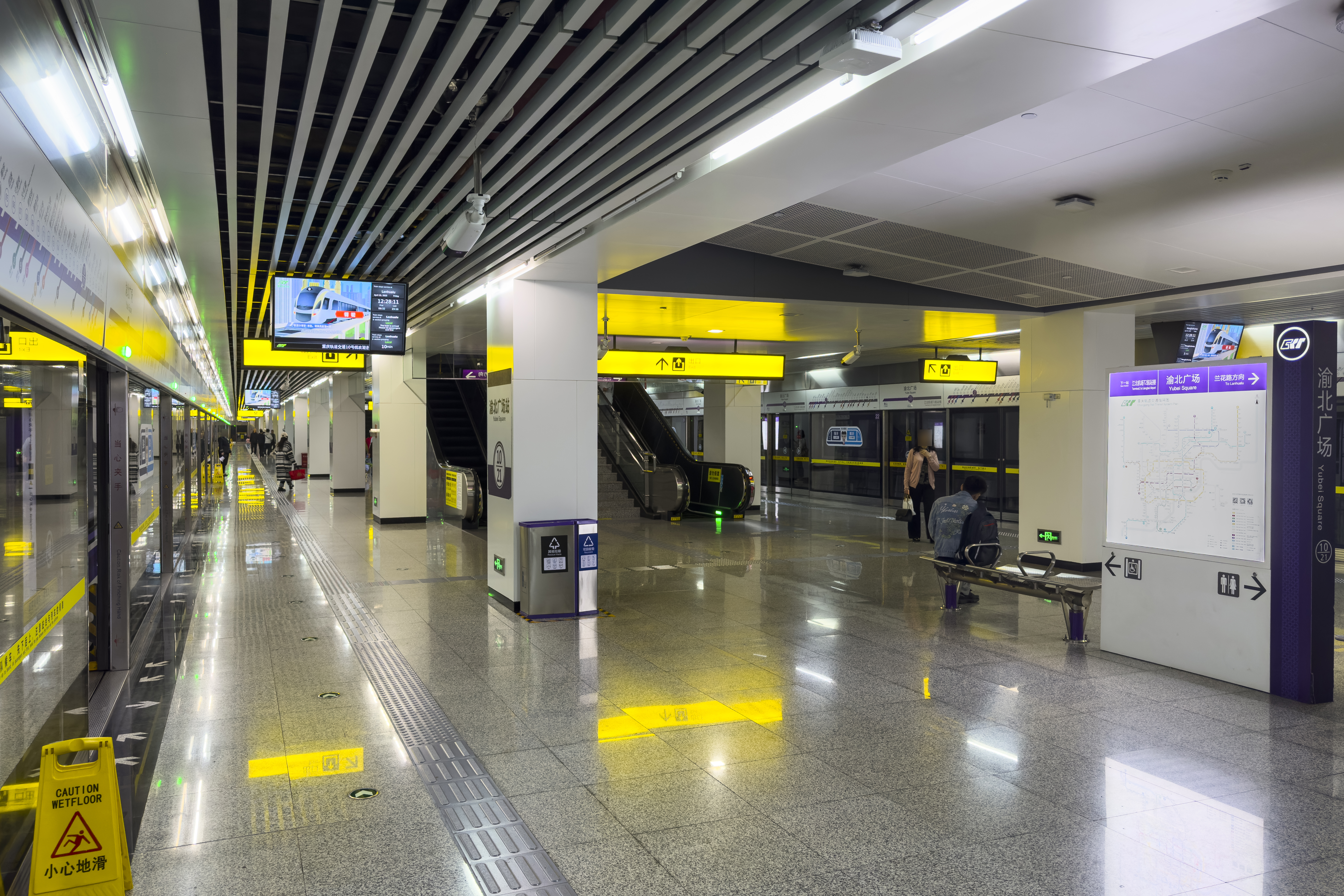

General information
- Location: Chongqing; China
- Coordinates: 29.721267°N 106.626107°E
- Operator: Chongqing Rail Transit Corp., Ltd
- Line: Line 10

Construction
- Structure type: Underground

Other information
- Station code: /

History
- Opened: 28 December 2017; 8 years ago

Services
Preceding station	Chongqing Rail Transit	Following station
Terminal 2 of Jiangbei Airport towards Lanhualu	Line 10	Lushan towards Wangjiazhuang
Location

Yubei Square Station is a station on Line 10 of Chongqing Rail Transit in Chongqing municipality, China. It is located in Yubei District, adjacent to the People's Government of Chongqing, Yubei District. It opened in 2017.
