= Changhe station =

Changhe station may refer to

== Metro stations ==
- Changhe station (Chongqing Rail Transit), a metro station in Chongqing, China that opened in 2017.
- Changhe station (Hangzhou Metro), a metro station on Line 5 and Line 6 of Hangzhou Metro in Hangzhou, China that is currently under construction.
