= Huanshan Park station =

Chongqing Rail Transit station

Huanshan Park 环山公园
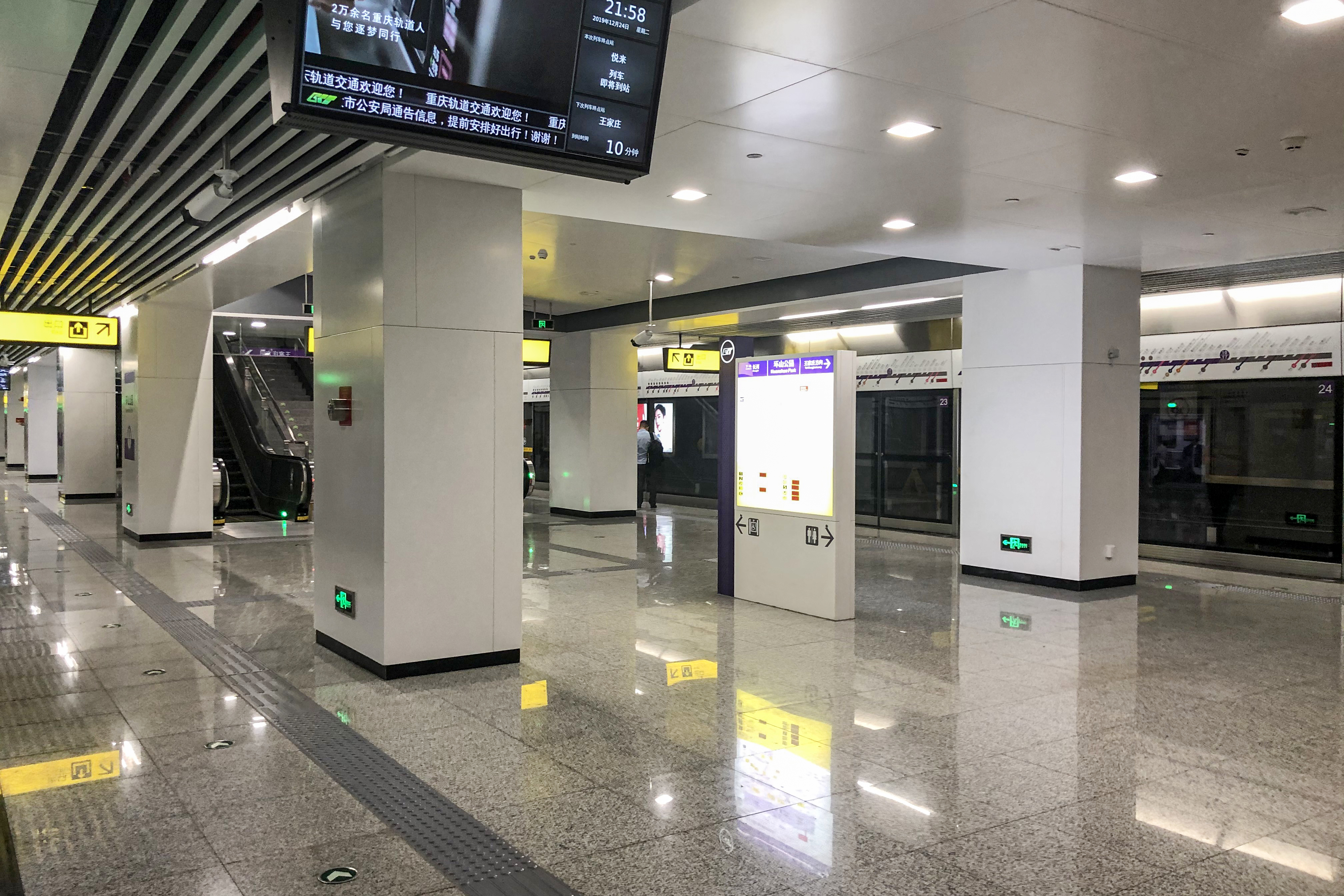

General information
- Location: Chongqing; China
- Coordinates: 29.6618°N 106.6184°E
- Operator: Chongqing Rail Transit Corp., Ltd
- Line: Line 10

Construction
- Structure type: Underground

Other information
- Station code: 10/17

History
- Opened: 28 December 2017; 8 years ago

Services
Preceding station	Chongqing Rail Transit	Following station
Shangwanlu towards Lanhualu	Line 10	Changhe towards Wangjiazhuang
Location

Huanshan Park Station is a station on Line 10 of Chongqing Rail Transit in Chongqing municipality, China. It is located in Yubei District and opened in 2017.
