= Liyuchi station =

Metro station in Chongqing, China

Liyuchi 鲤鱼池
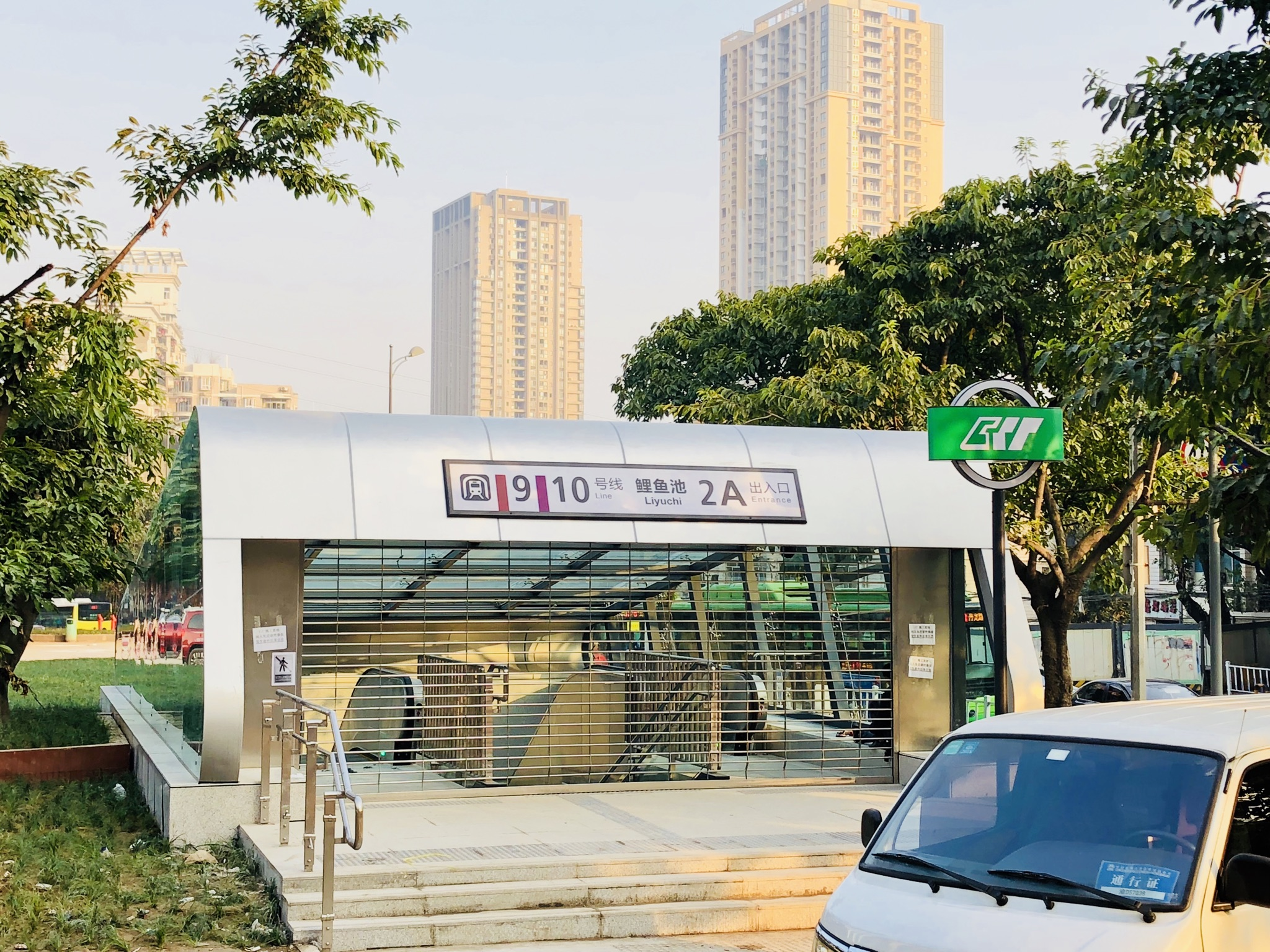
- Exit 2A of the station

General information
- Location: Chongqing; China
- Coordinates: 29.5769°N 106.5464°E
- Operated by: Chongqing Rail Transit Corp., Ltd
- Lines: Line 9 Line 10
- Platforms: 4 (2 island platforms)
- Connections: Bus

Construction
- Structure type: Underground
- Accessible: 2 accessible elevators

Other information
- Station code: /, /

History
- Opened: 28 December 2017; 8 years ago (Line 10); 25 January 2022; 4 years ago Line 9)

Services
Preceding station	Chongqing Rail Transit	Following station
Guanyinqiao towards Gaotanyan	Line 9	Liujiatai towards Huashigou
Zengjiayan towards Lanhualu	Line 10	Hongtudi towards Wangjiazhuang
Zengjiayan towards Lanhualu	Line 10 Rapid	Hongtudi towards Wangjiazhuang
Location

Liyuchi is a metro station of Line 9 and Line 10 of Chongqing Rail Transit in Jiangbei District of Chongqing Municipality, China.

It serves the area surrounding East Jianxin Road.

The station opened with Line 10 and its 2 platforms on 28 December 2017 and was expanded on 25 January 2022 with Line 9 in addition to 2 more platforms.

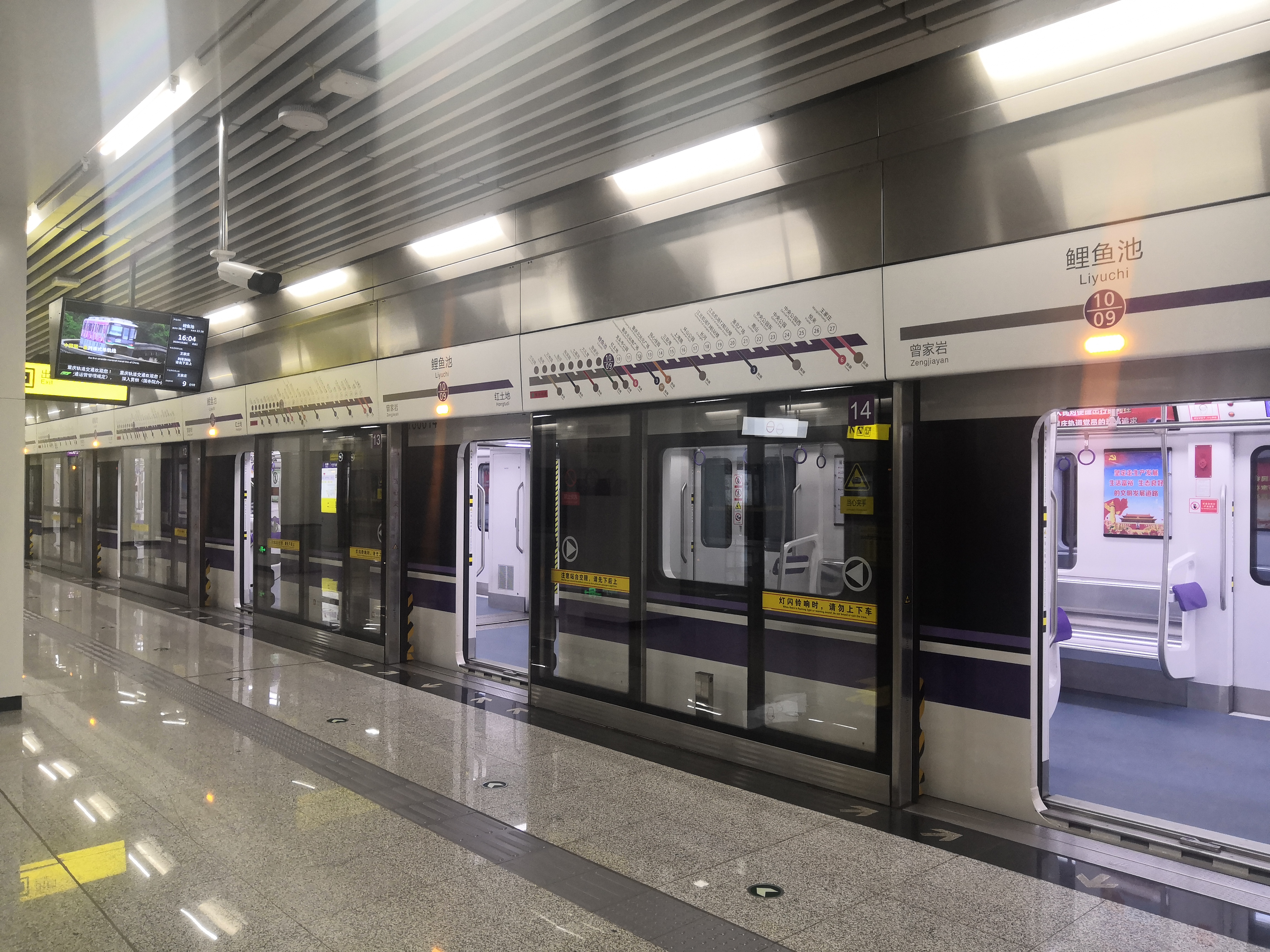
Platform of Line 10

== Station structure ==
=== Line 9 platform ===
Platform Layout

An island platform is in use for Line 9 trains travelling in both directions. This section of the station is located on the east of the Line 10 platform.

To Line 9 Gaotanyan	←	9/13	←
	Island Platform, doors open on the left
	→	9/13	→	To Line 9 Huashigou

=== Line 10 platform ===
Platform Layout

An island platform is used for Line 10 trains travelling in both directions. As stations beyond here toward Lanhualu are part of Phase II of the metro line, which is still under construction, all South-bound Line 10 trains terminate here. The station will act as a reversing station using its single transition line for trains to switch direction until Phase 2 is completed. Before November 2022, only one side of the platform was in use as the terminus for south-bound trains.
Since November 2022, to cooperate with the debugging of Phase 2, the reserved platform has been put into use for trains towards Wangjiazhuang. However, at the beginning of the debugging, some trains still terminate here. But when the period is over, no trains will terminate here.

Status at the beginning of the debugging

To Line 10 Houbao (No boarding)	←→	10/09	←→	↘
	Island platform, doors open on the left			↓
	→	10/09	→	To Line 10 Wangjiazhuang

Current layout

To Line 10 Houbao	←	10/09	←
	Island platform, doors open on the left
	→	10/09	→	To Line 10 Wangjiazhuang

== Exits ==
There are a total of 8 entrances/exits for the plan of station, still 4 exits reserved for its future construction.

== Surroundings ==
Nearby places

- East Jianxin Road

Nearby Stations

- Hongtudi station (a Line 6 & Line 10 Station)

== See also ==
- Chongqing Rail Transit (CRT)
- Line 9 (CRT)
- Line 10 (CRT)
