= Central Park East station =

Chongqing Rail Transit station

Central Park East 中央公园东
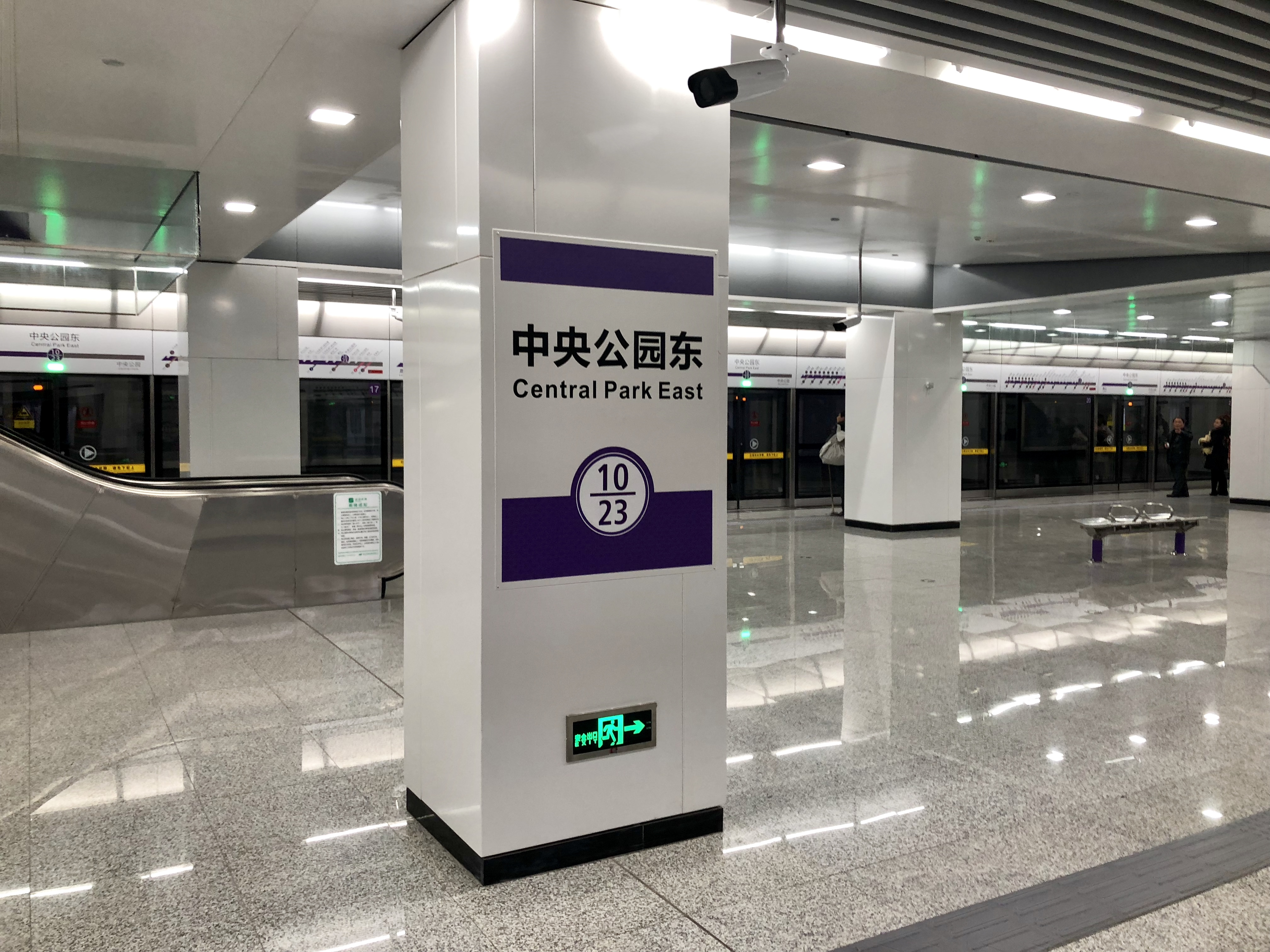

General information
- Location: Chongqing; China
- Coordinates: 29.72651°N 106.5887°E
- Operator: Chongqing Rail Transit Corp., Ltd
- Lines: Line 9 Line 10

Construction
- Structure type: Underground

Other information
- Station code: / / /

History
- Opened: 28 December 2017; 8 years ago (Line 10); 18 January 2023; 3 years ago (Line 9)

Services
Preceding station	Chongqing Rail Transit	Following station
Langui Ave. towards Gaotanyan	Line 9	Congyansi towards Huashigou
Lushan towards Lanhualu	Line 10	Central Park towards Wangjiazhuang
Location

Central Park East Station is a station on Line 9 and Line 10 of Chongqing Rail Transit in Chongqing municipality, China. It is located in Yubei District and opened in 2017.
