= Chongqing North Station South Square station =

Metro station in Chongqing, China

Chongqing North Station South Square 重庆北站南广场
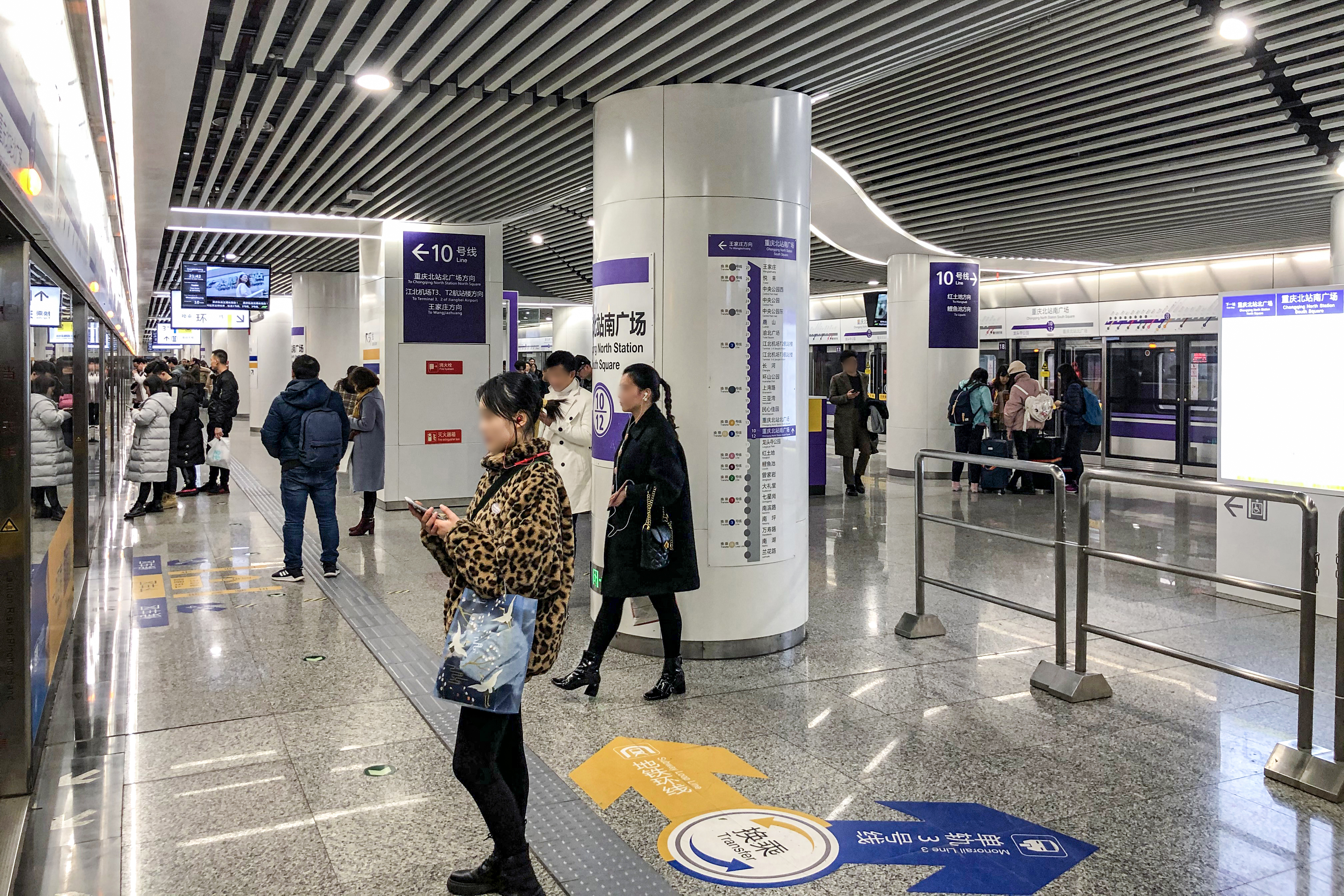
- Line 10 platform

General information
- Other names: Chongqingbei Railway Station (former name); South Square of Chongqingbei Railway Station (old translation)
- Location: Chongqing North railway station, Yubei District, Chongqing; China
- Coordinates: 29.60922°N 106.547°E
- Operator: Chongqing Rail Transit Co., Ltd.
- Lines: Line 3 Line 10; Loop line
- Platforms: 6 platforms (2 side platforms and 2 island platforms)
- Connections: Chongqing North railway station

Construction
- Structure type: Underground
- Accessible: Yes

Other information
- Station code: /, /, /

History
- Opened: 29 September 2011; 15 years ago (Line 3); 28 December 2018; 7 years ago (Line 10 and Loop line)
- Former names: Chongqingbei Railway Station

Services
| Preceding station | Chongqing Rail Transit | Following station |
|---|---|---|
| Shiziping towards Yudong | Line 3 | Longtousi towards Terminal 2 of Jiangbei Airport |
| Longtousi Park towards Lanhualu | Line 10 | Chongqing North Station North Square towards Wangjiazhuang |
| Hongtudi towards Lanhualu | Line 10 Rapid | Chongqing North Station North Square towards Wangjiazhuang |
| Min'an Ave. Counter-clockwise | Loop line | Yulu Clockwise |
Location

Chongqing North Station South Square (simplified Chinese: 重庆北站南广场; traditional Chinese: 重慶北站南廣場; pinyin: Chóngqìng Běizhàn Nánguǎngchǎng), previously known simply as Chongqingbei Railway Station, is an interchange station on Line 3 (straddle beam monorail), Line 10 (heavy rail subway) and the Loop line (heavy rail subway) of Chongqing Rail Transit.

Located in Chongqing's Yubei District, it serves the nearby Chongqing North railway station.

== History ==
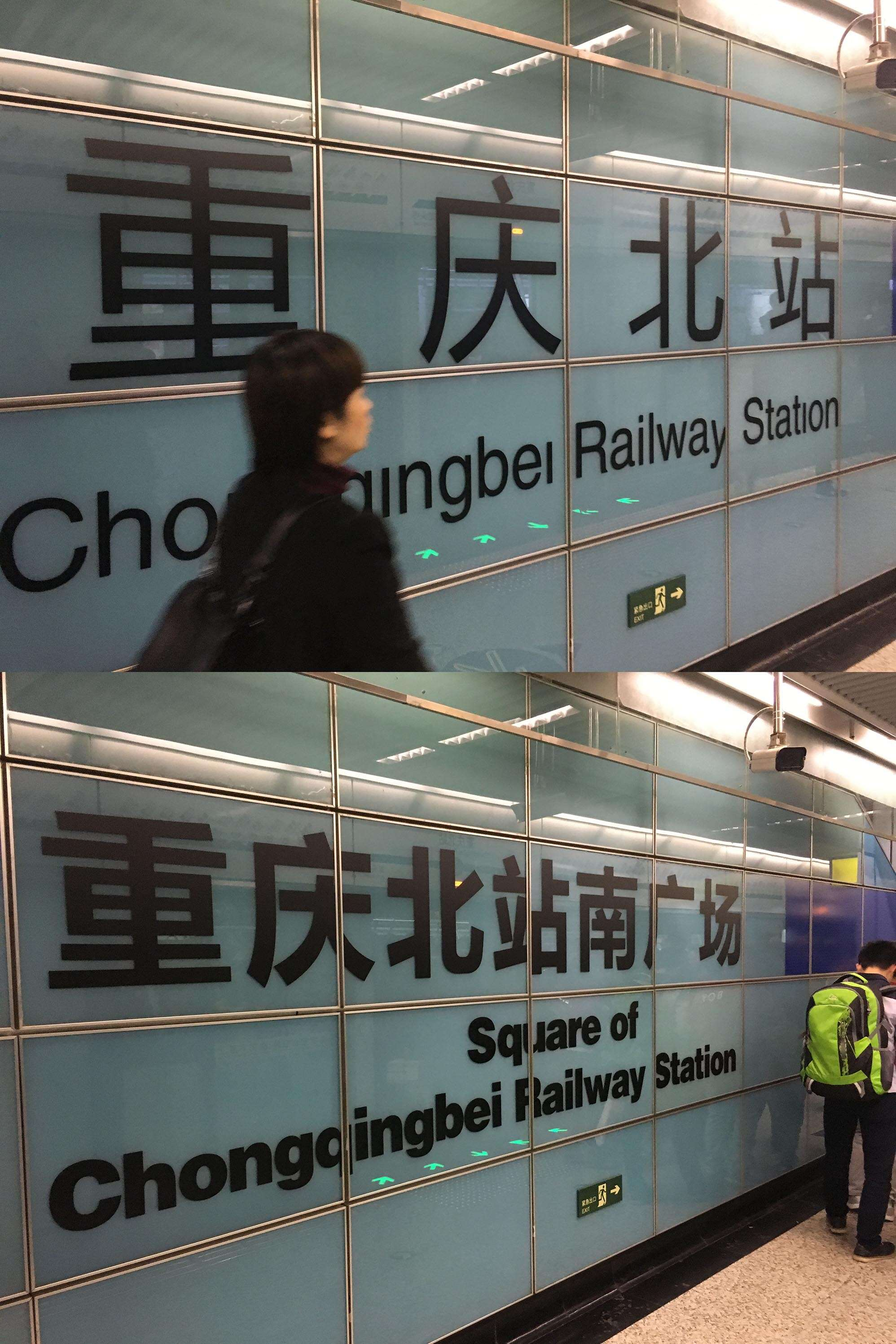
Line 3 platform signage wall before and after the name change.

It opened with the first phase of Line 3 on September 29, 2011 as Chongqingbei Railway Station (simplified Chinese: 重庆北站; traditional Chinese: 重慶北站; pinyin: Chóngqìng Běizhàn). On March 23, 2016, in anticipation of the opening of another metro station just north of the same railway station, its name was changed to reflect its location serving the south square of the railway station.

On December 28, 2017, Line 10 opened for passenger operations, however the Line 10 section of this station opened on December 28, 2018, exactly one year later than the other stations in the Phase 1 of Line 10.

The Loop line section of the station also opened on December 28, 2018.

Together the three lines (Line 3, Line 10 and the Loop Line) share the same concourse for entrance/exit and transfer while the Loop Line has one other concourse that solely serves Loop Line passengers.

== Station structure ==
=== Loop line platform ===
An island platform is used for Loop Line trains travelling in both directions.

| To Loop line Min'an Ave. | ← | 环/15 | ← | Counterclockwise Loop |
| | Island Platform Doors open on the left |
| Clockwise Loop | → | 环/15 | → | To Loop line Yulu |

=== Line 3 platforms ===
Platform Layout

There are two side platforms for Line 3 trains.

| | Side Platform Doors open on the right |
| To Line 3 Terminal 2 of Jiangbei Airport | ← | 3/27 | ← |
| | → | 3/27 | → | To Line 3 Yudong |
| | Side Platform Doors open on the right |

=== Line 10 platform ===
Platform Layout

An island platform is used for Line 10 trains travelling in both directions.

| To Line 10 Lanhualu | ← | 10/12 | ← |
| | Island Platform Doors open on the left |
| | → | 10/12 | → | To Line 10 Wangjiazhuang |
