= Central Park West station =

Chongqing Rail Transit station

Central Park West 中央公园西
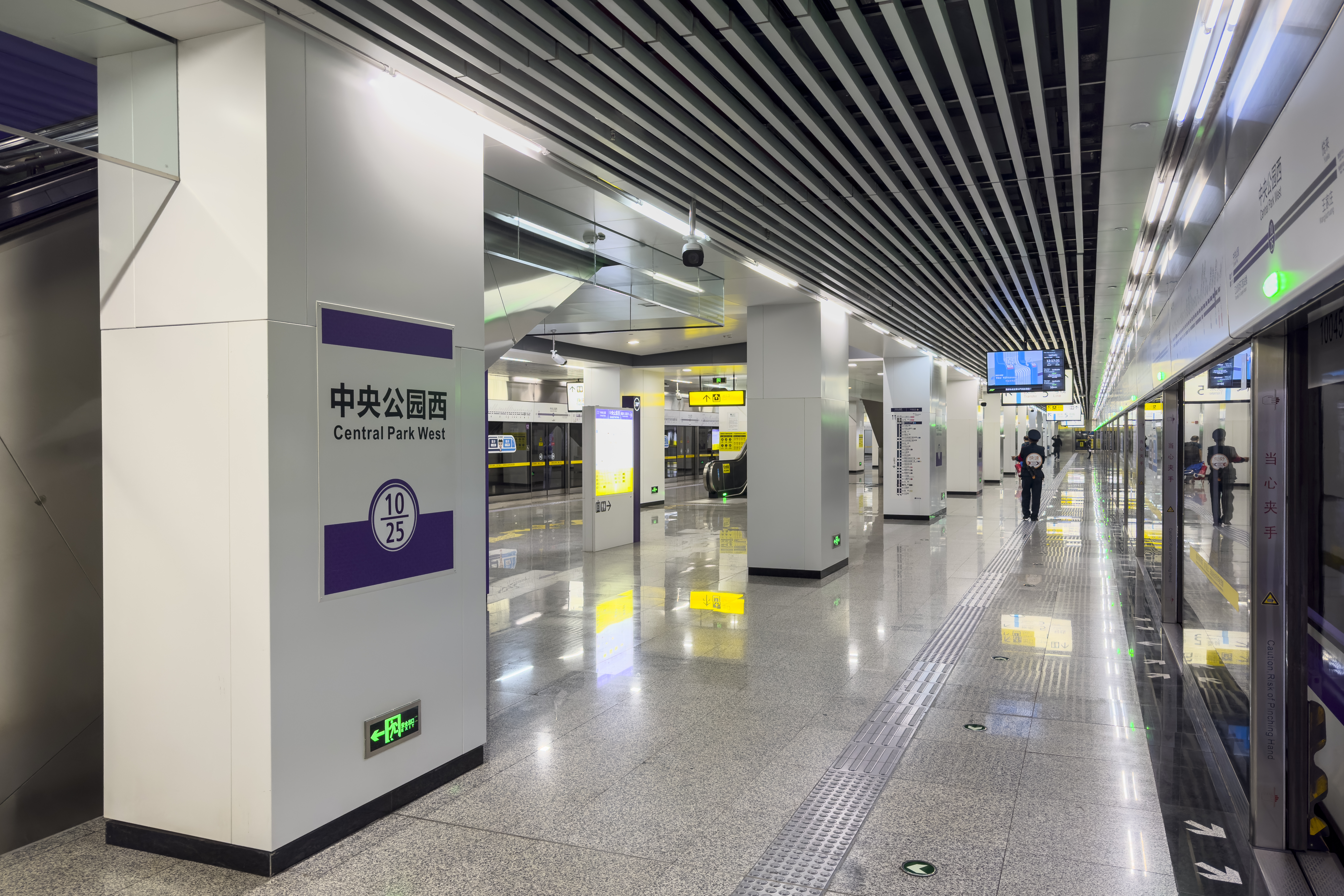
- Line 10 platform

General information
- Location: Chongqing; China
- Coordinates: 29.72653°N 106.56872°E
- Operator: Chongqing Rail Transit Corp., Ltd
- Lines: Line 5 Line 10

Construction
- Structure type: Underground

Other information
- Station code: / / /

History
- Opened: 28 December 2017; 8 years ago (Line 10); 27 February 2023; 3 years ago (Line 5)

Services
Preceding station	Chongqing Rail Transit	Following station
Chunxuan Ave. towards Yuegangbeilu	Line 5	Lujiagou towards Tiaodeng
Central Park towards Lanhualu	Line 10	Yuelai towards Wangjiazhuang
Location

Central Park West Station is a station on Line 5 and Line 10 of Chongqing Rail Transit in Chongqing municipality, China. It is located in Yubei District and opened in 2017.

== Station structure ==
=== Line 5 platform ===
B2; Concourse	Exits, Customer service, Vending machines
B3; Platforms	Line 5 to Yuegangbeilu (Chunxuan Ave.)
B3; Platforms	Island platform
B3; Platforms	Line 5 to Tiaodeng (Lujiagou)

=== Line 10 platform ===
B1; Concourse	Exits, Customer service, Vending machines
B2; Platforms	Line 10 to Lanhualu (Central Park)
B2; Platforms	Island platform
B2; Platforms	Line 10 to Wangjiazhuang (Yuelai)
