= Central Park station (Chongqing Rail Transit) =

Chongqing Rail Transit station

Central Park 中央公园
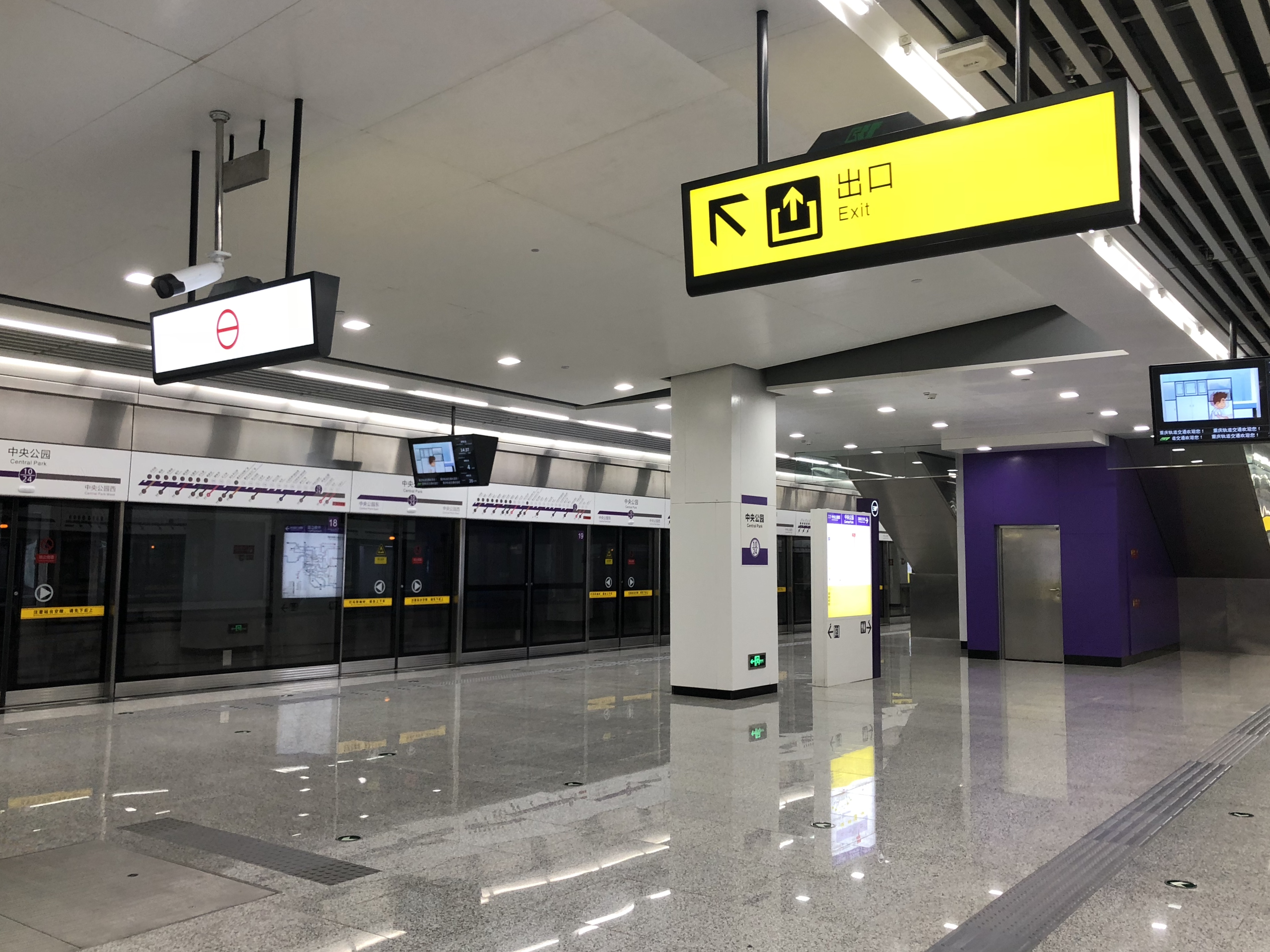

General information
- Location: Chongqing; China
- Coordinates: 29.72652°N 106.57997°E
- Operator: Chongqing Rail Transit Corp., Ltd
- Line: Line 10

Construction
- Structure type: Underground

Other information
- Station code: /

History
- Opened: 28 December 2017; 8 years ago

Services
Preceding station	Chongqing Rail Transit	Following station
Central Park East towards Lanhualu	Line 10	Central Park West towards Wangjiazhuang
Location

Central Park Station is a station on Line 10 of Chongqing Rail Transit in Chongqing municipality, China. It is located in Yubei District and opened in 2017.
