= Hongtudi station =

Metro station in Chongqing, China

Hongtudi 红土地
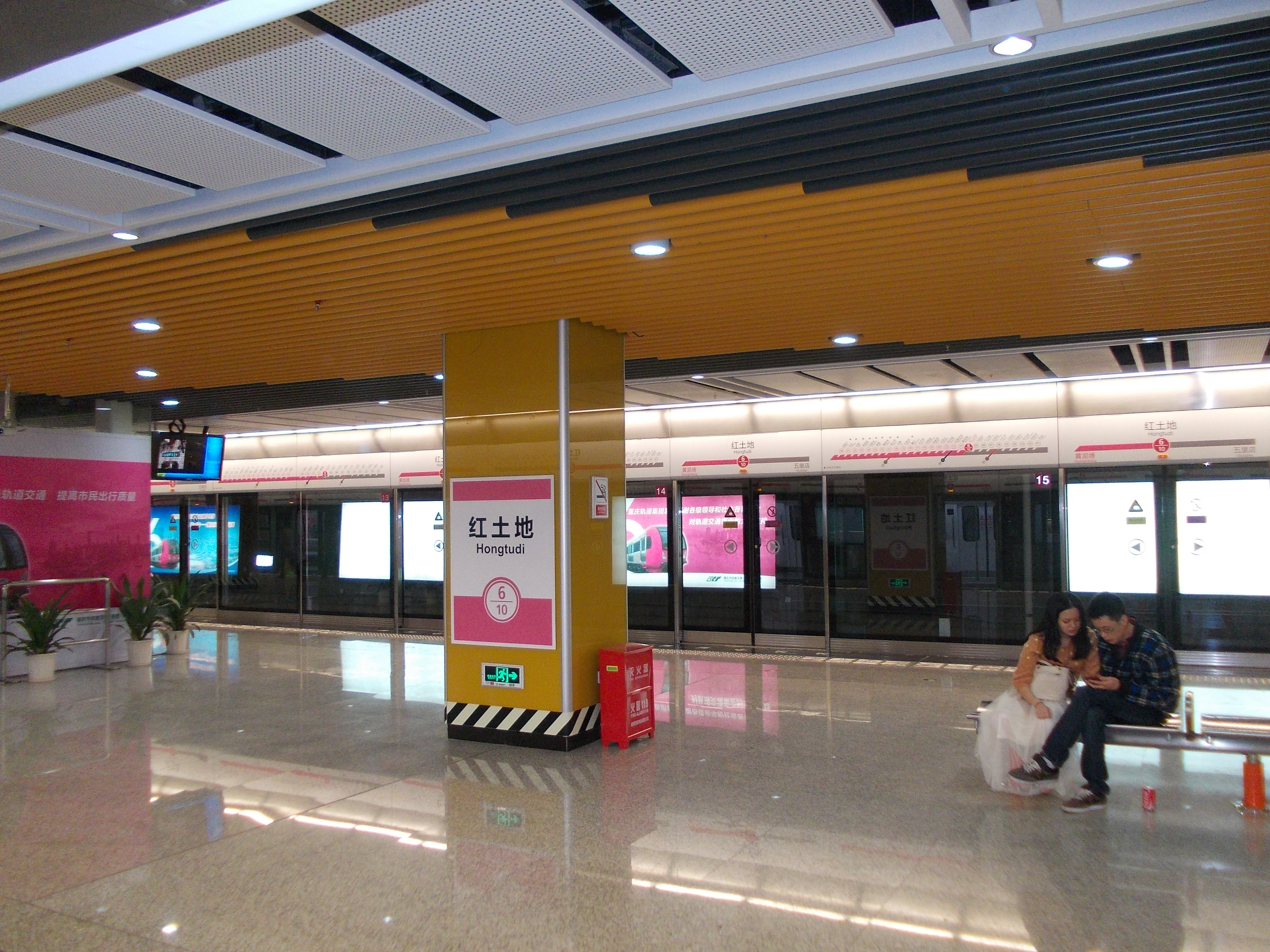

General information
- Location: Chongqing; China
- Coordinates: 29.586817°N 106.547286°E
- Operated by: Chongqing Rail Transit Corp., Ltd
- Lines: Line 6 Line 10
- Platforms: 4 (2 island platforms)

Construction
- Structure type: Underground
- Depth: 94.467 m (309.93 ft)
- Accessible: 4 accessible elevators

Other information
- Station code: /, /

History
- Opened: 28 September 2012; 13 years ago (Line 6); 28 December 2017; 8 years ago (Line 10)

Services
Preceding station	Chongqing Rail Transit	Following station
Wulidian towards Chayuan	Line 6	Huangnibang towards Beibei
Liyuchi towards Lanhualu	Line 10	Longtousi Park towards Wangjiazhuang
Liyuchi towards Lanhualu	Line 10 Rapid	Chongqing N. Station S. Square towards Wangjiazhuang
Location

Hongtudi is an interchange station on Line 6 and Line 10 of Chongqing Rail Transit in Chongqing Municipality, China. It is located in the Jiangbei District. The lowest level being 94 meters below ground makes it one of the world's deepest subway stations.

== History ==
In 2012, the opening of the Line 6 platforms made the station the deepest subway station in China, at over 60 meters below the surface. In 2017, the station became even deeper with the opening of Line 10 platforms, reaching over 94 meters below the ground. The new Line 10 platforms became one of the deepest subway stations in the world after Arsenalna Station in the Kyiv Metro. (Currently the record has been broken by Hongyancun station of Line 9, reaching 116 meters below the ground) The journey from the surface to Line 10 platforms takes over 5 minutes. The station's extreme depth, large transfer demand between the two lines and numerous entrances on the surface necessitates the need for over 91 escalators to be installed throughout the entire station.

== Station structure ==
=== Floors ===
1F	Above ground	Entrance/Exits, Accessible elevators
	Entrance/Exit passageways	Exits 1A, 1B
	Entrance/Exit passageways	Exits 3A, 3B
B1	Line Line 6 Station Concourse	Ticket machines, Ticket gates, Customer service center, Interchange channel for Line 10
B2	Line Line 6 Platform	Trains, One-way Interchange channel from Line 10
	Interchange channel	Interchange between Line 6 & Line 10
B3	Line Line 10 Station Concourse	Ticket machines, Ticket gates, Customer service center, Interchange channel for Line 6
B4	Line Line 10 Platform	Trains, One-way Interchange channel to Line 6

=== Line 6 Platform ===
Platform layout

An island platform is used for Line 6 trains travelling in both directions.

To Line 6 Beibei	←	6/10	←
	Island Platform Doors open on the left
	→	6/10	→	To Line 6 Chayuan

=== Line 10 Platform ===
Platform layout

An island platform is used for Line 10 trains travelling in both directions.

To Line 10 Lanhualu	←	10/10	←
	Island Platform Doors open on the left
	→	10/10	→	To Line 10 Wangjiazhuang

== Exits ==
There are a total of 4 entrances/exits currently in use for the station. Exit 2 closed after the opening of Line 10.

Exit	To
1A	Wuhong Road, Chuangxin Luse Garden residential block
1B	Wuhong Road, Jinke Garden residential block
3A	Wuhong Road, Tian'an Dingdu residential block, Ji'an Yuan residential block
3B	Wuhong Road, Chang'an Lidu residential block

== Surroundings ==
Nearby places

- Wuhong Road
- Chuangxin Luse Garden residential block
- Jinke Garden residential block
- Tian'an Dingdu residential block
- Ji'an Yuan residential block
- Lidu residential block

Nearby stations

- Liyuchi (a Line 10 station)
