= Lushan station =

Chongqing Rail Transit station

Coordinates: 29°43′24″N 106°36′13″E

Lushan 鹿山
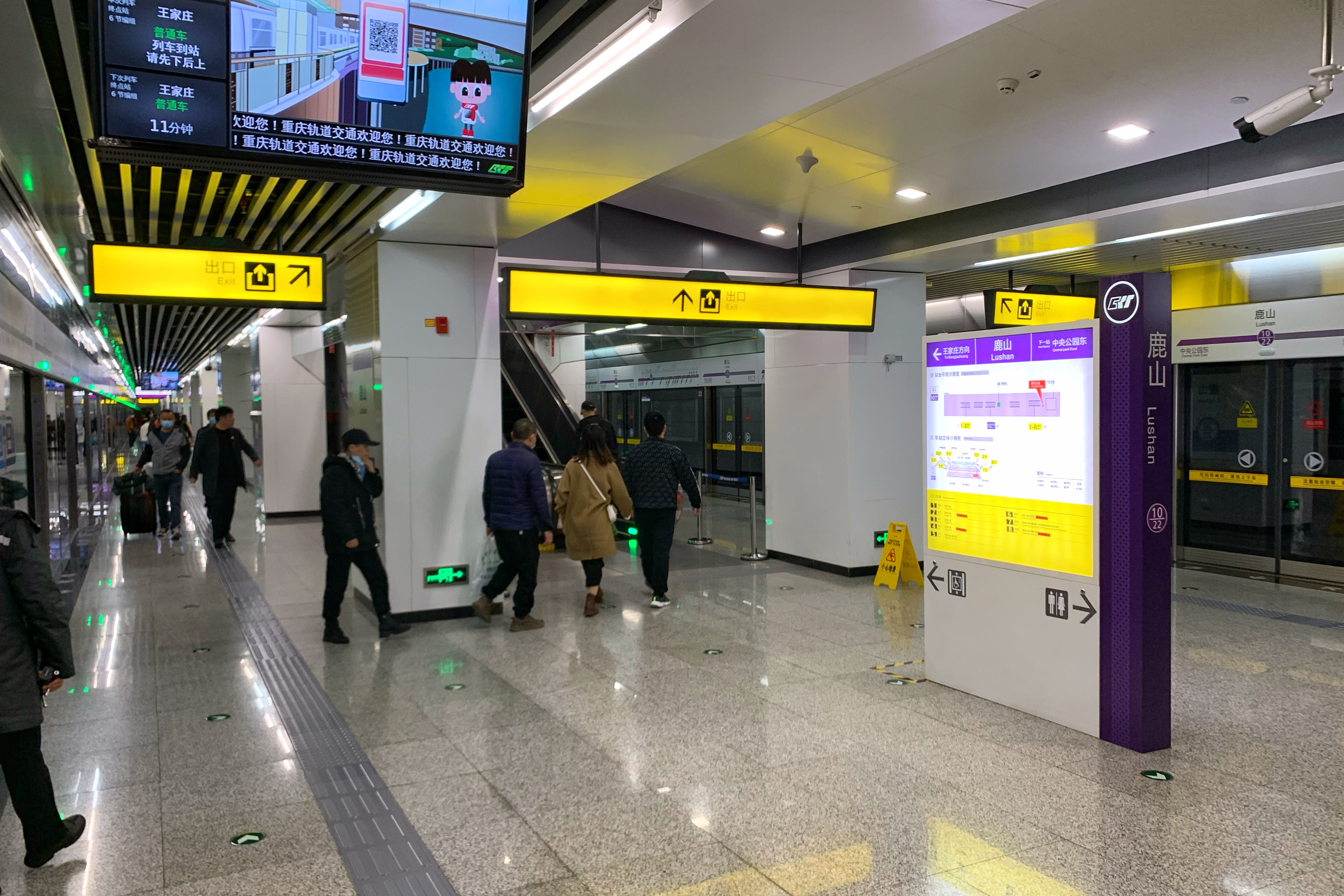

General information
- Location: Chongqing; China
- Operator: Chongqing Rail Transit Corp., Ltd
- Line: Line 10
- Platforms: 4 (2 island platforms)

Construction
- Structure type: Underground

Other information
- Station code: 10/22

History
- Opened: 28 December 2017; 8 years ago

Services
Preceding station	Chongqing Rail Transit	Following station
Yubei Square towards Lanhualu	Line 10	Central Park East towards Wangjiazhuang
Location

Lushan Station is a station on Line 10 of Chongqing Rail Transit in Chongqing municipality, China. It is located in Yubei District and opened in 2017.

== Station structure ==
There are 2 island platforms at this station, located separately on two floors. On each floor, only one side of the platforms is used for Local trains to stop, while the other side is used for Rapid trains to pass through.

B1; Concourse	Exits, Customer service, Vending machines
B2; Platforms	Bypass track for Line 10 rapid trains
B2; Platforms	Island platform
B2; Platforms	Line 10 to Wangjiazhuang (Central Park East)
B3; Platforms	Line 10 to Lanhualu (Yubei Square)
B3; Platforms	Island platform
B3; Platforms	Bypass track for Line 10 rapid trains
