= Longtousi Park station =

Chongqing Rail Transit station

Longtousi Park 龙头寺公园
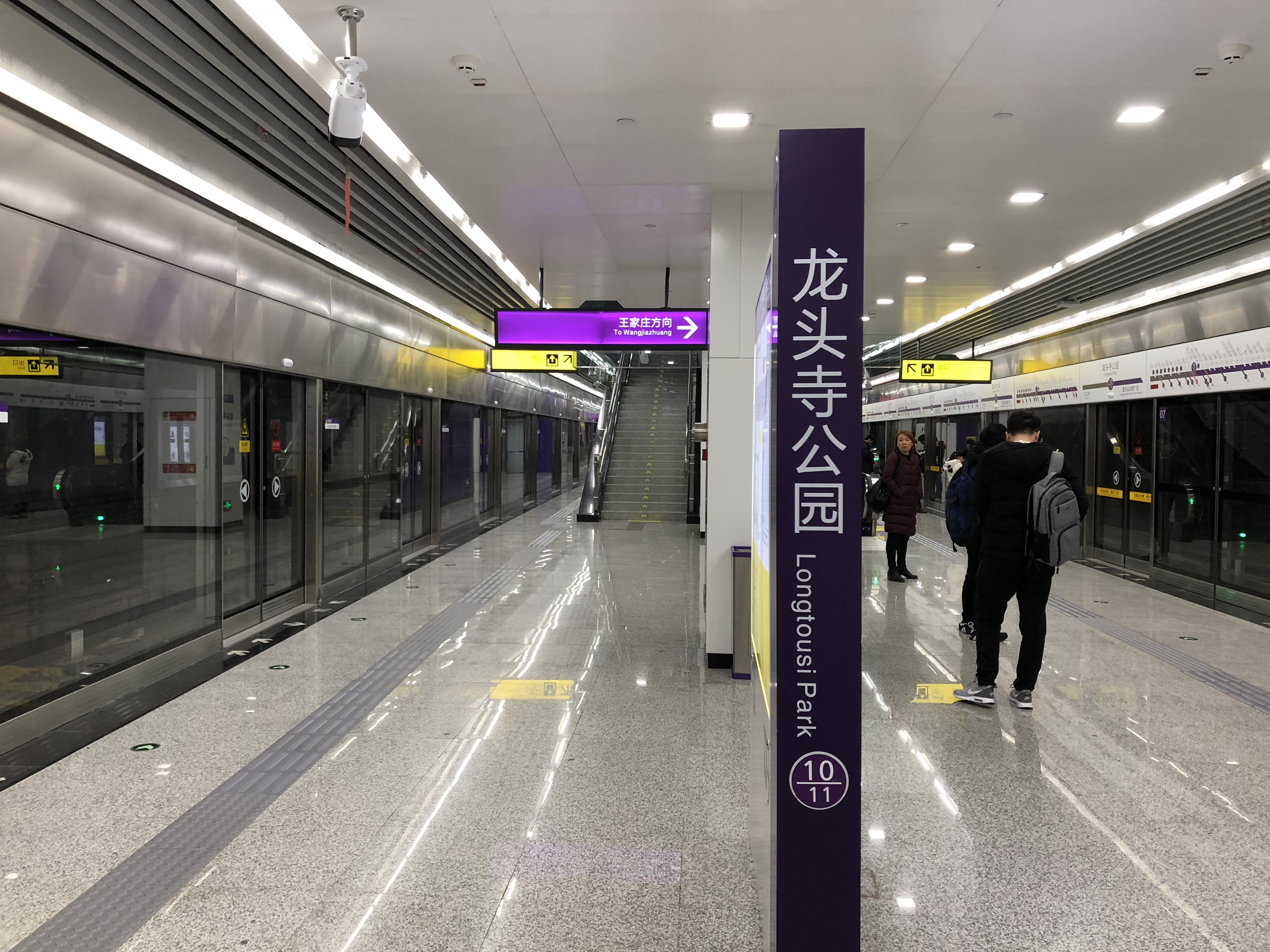

General information
- Location: Chongqing; China
- Operator: Chongqing Rail Transit Corp., Ltd
- Line: Line 10
- Platforms: 4 (2 island platforms)

Construction
- Structure type: Underground

Other information
- Station code: 10/11

History
- Opened: 28 December 2017; 8 years ago

Services
Preceding station	Chongqing Rail Transit	Following station
Hongtudi towards Lanhualu	Line 10	Chongqing North Station South Square towards Wangjiazhuang
Location

Longtousi Park Station is a station on Line 10 of Chongqing Rail Transit in Chongqing municipality, China. It is located in Yubei District and opened in 2017.

== Station structure ==
There are two island platforms at this station, but only two inner platforms are used for local trains to stop, and for rapid trains to pass, while the other two outer platforms are reserved.

B1; Concourse	Exits, customer service, vending machines
B2; Platforms	No regular service
B2; Platforms	Island platform
B2; Platforms	Line 10 to Lanhualu (Hongtudi)
B2; Platforms	Line 10 to Wangjiazhuang (Chongqing North Station South Square)
B2; Platforms	Island platform
B2; Platforms	No regular service
