= Terminal 3 of Jiangbei Airport station =

Metro station in Chongqing, China

Terminal 3 of Jiangbei Airport 江北机场T3航站楼
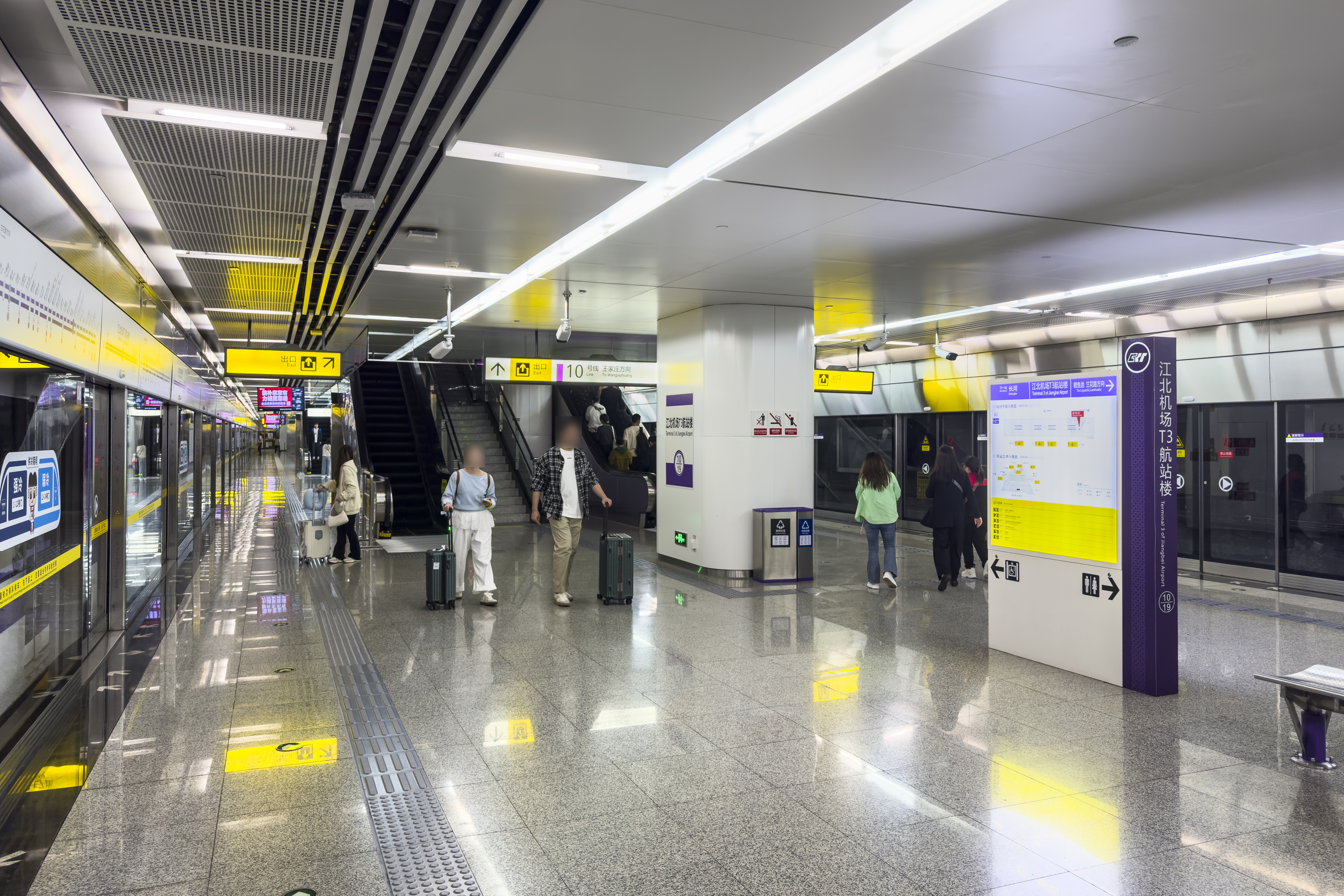

General information
- Location: Yubei District, Chongqing; China
- Coordinates: 29.7100°N 106.6513°E
- Operator: Chongqing Rail Transit Corp., Ltd
- Lines: Line 10; 15 Line 15 (under construction)
- Platforms: 4 (2 island platforms)
- Connections: Chongqing Jiangbei International Airport (Terminal 3); (Jiangbei Airport railway station); GTC (Ground Traffic Center of Terminal 3)

Construction
- Structure type: Underground
- Accessible: 6 accessible elevators

Other information
- Station code: /

History
- Opened: 28 December 2017; 8 years ago

Services
Preceding station	Chongqing Rail Transit	Following station
Changhe towards Lanhualu	Line 10	Terminal 2 of Jiangbei Airport towards Wangjiazhuang
Chongqing North Station North Square towards Lanhualu	Line 10 Rapid	Terminal 2 of Jiangbei Airport towards Wangjiazhuang
Location

Terminal 3 of Jiangbei Airport is a metro station of Line 10 of Chongqing Rail Transit in Liangjiang, Chongqing Municipality, China.

It serves the airport terminal in which the station's name derived from (Terminal 3A of Chongqing Jiangbei International Airport) and its surrounding area, including office buildings for Chongqing Airport Group and other facilities used by both airlines and the airport.

The station opened 4 months after the inauguration of Terminal 3A of the airport, before this public transportation to the terminal was served solely by airport buses and long-distance coaches. Free terminal shuttle buses were also arranged by the airport for passengers transferring between Terminals 2A & 2B and Terminal 3A partially to compensate the lack of the 2 Line 10 stations linking the terminals. The shuttle buses remain in service to this day as an alternative to the metro line.

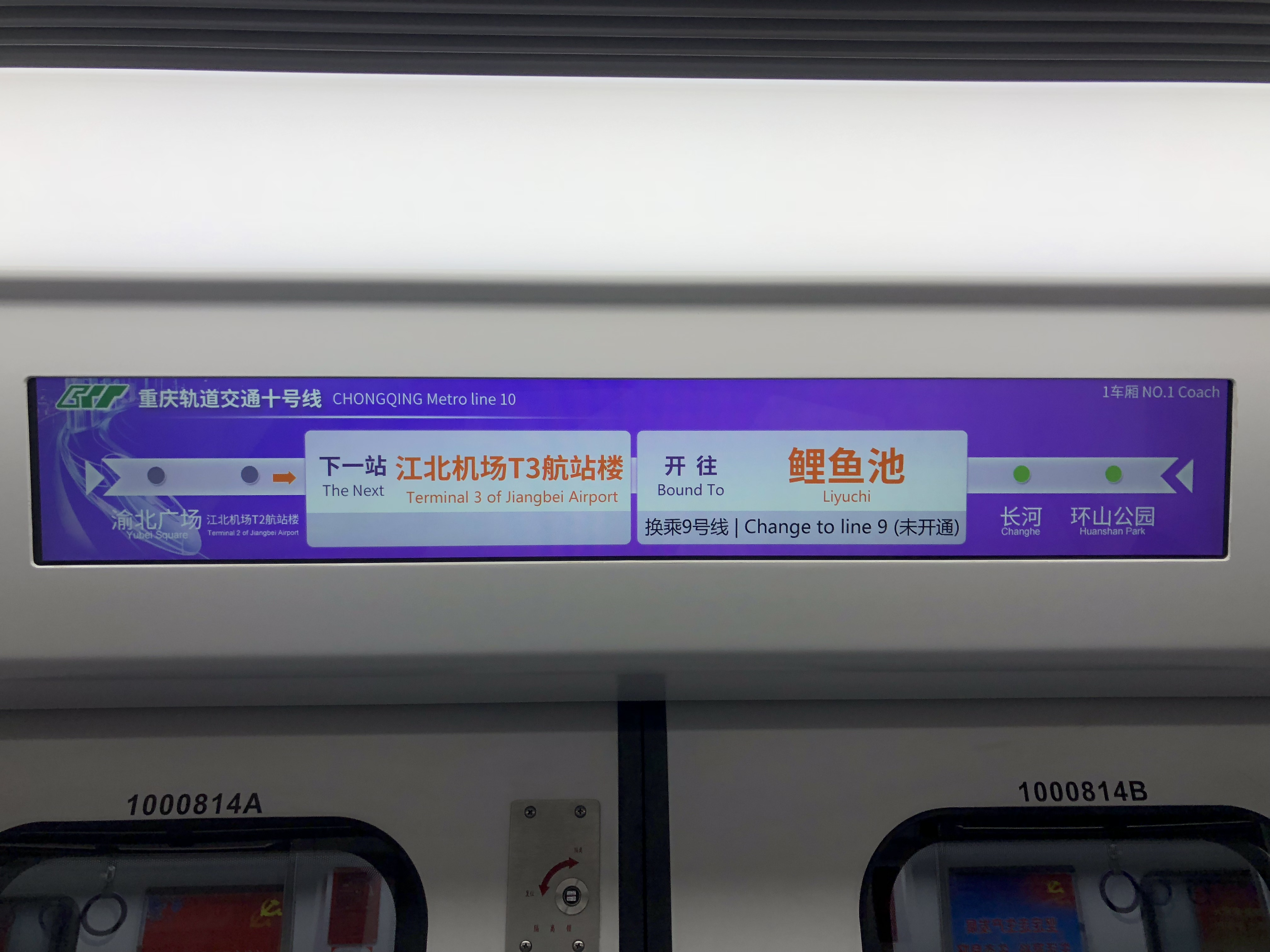
A LCD screen on a Line 10 train displaying its arrival to the station

== Station structure ==
=== Line 10 platforms ===
Platform Layout

A total of 2 island platforms is used for Line 10 trains travelling in both directions.

Normal Line 10 services (stopping at all stations along the line) run through the 2 outer tracks whereas the 2 inner tracks are reserved for future Line 10 services with alternate route plans.

To Line 10 Lanhualu	←	10/19	←
	Island Platform Doors open on the left
	Track reserved	10/19	Track reserved	For alternate Line 10 routing

For alternate Line 10 routing	Track reserved	10/19	Track reserved
	Island Platform Doors open on the left
	→	10/19	→	To Line 10 Wangjiazhuang

== Exits ==
There are a total of 6 entrances/exits for the station.

Exit	To
1	Taxis
2	Domestic Departures, International Departures
3	Domestic Departures, International Departures
4	Domestic Arrivals, International Arrivals
5	Car park
6	Airport buses

== Surroundings ==
GTC

- Chongqing Jiangbei International Airport

Situated inside the Ground Traffic Center (GTC) of Terminal 3, the station is transferable with other modes of ground transportation at the terminal, including terminal shuttle buses, airport buses, long-distance coaches, taxis, car pooling services and private cars. Intercity railway services operated by CRH will also be available when its construction is complete.

Nearby Stations

- Terminal 2 of Jiangbei Airport Station (a Line 3 & Line 10 Station)

== See also ==
- Chongqing Jiangbei International Airport
- Chongqing Rail Transit (CRT)
- Line 10 (CRT)
