= Shangwanlu station =

Chongqing Rail Transit station

Shangwanlu 上湾路
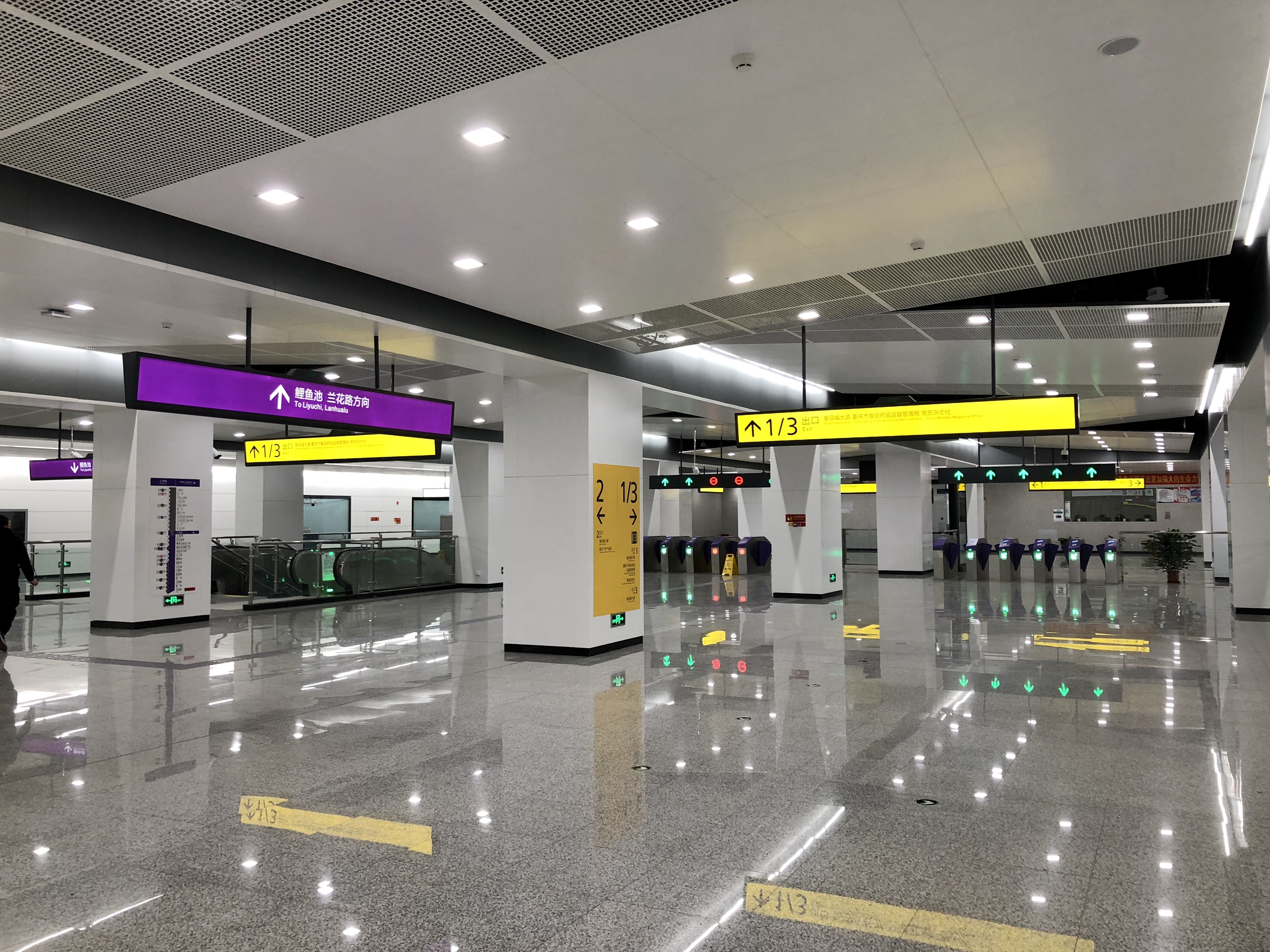

General information
- Location: Chongqing; China
- Coordinates: 29.65274°N 106.60577°E
- Operator: Chongqing Rail Transit Corp., Ltd
- Lines: Line 9 Line 10
- Platforms: 4 (2 island platforms)

Construction
- Structure type: Underground

Other information
- Station code: / /

History
- Opened: 28 December 2017; 8 years ago (Line 10); 25 January 2022; 4 years ago (Line 9)

Services
Preceding station	Chongqing Rail Transit	Following station
Shipanhe towards Gaotanyan	Line 9	Qinggangping towards Huashigou
Sanyawan towards Lanhualu	Line 10	Huanshan Park towards Wangjiazhuang
Location

Shangwanlu station (Chinese: 上湾路站; pinyin: Shàngwānlù zhàn; lit. 'Shangwan Road station') is an interchange station between Line 9 and Line 10 of Chongqing Rail Transit in Chongqing municipality, China. It is located in Yubei District and opened in 2017.

== Station structure ==
There are two island platforms at this station. The two outer tracks are used for Line 9 trains, while the other two inner tracks are used for Line 10 trains. A same-direction cross-platform interchange is provided between the two metro lines.

B1; Concourse	Exits, customer service, vending machines
B2; Platforms	Line 9 to Gaotanyan (Shipanhe)
B2; Platforms	Island platform
B2; Platforms	Line 10 to Lanhualu (Sanyawan)
B2; Platforms	Line 10 to Wangjiazhuang (Huanshan Park)
B2; Platforms	Island platform
B2; Platforms	Line 9 to Huashigou (Qinggangping)
