= Shipanhe station =

Chongqing Rail Transit station

Shipanhe 石盘河
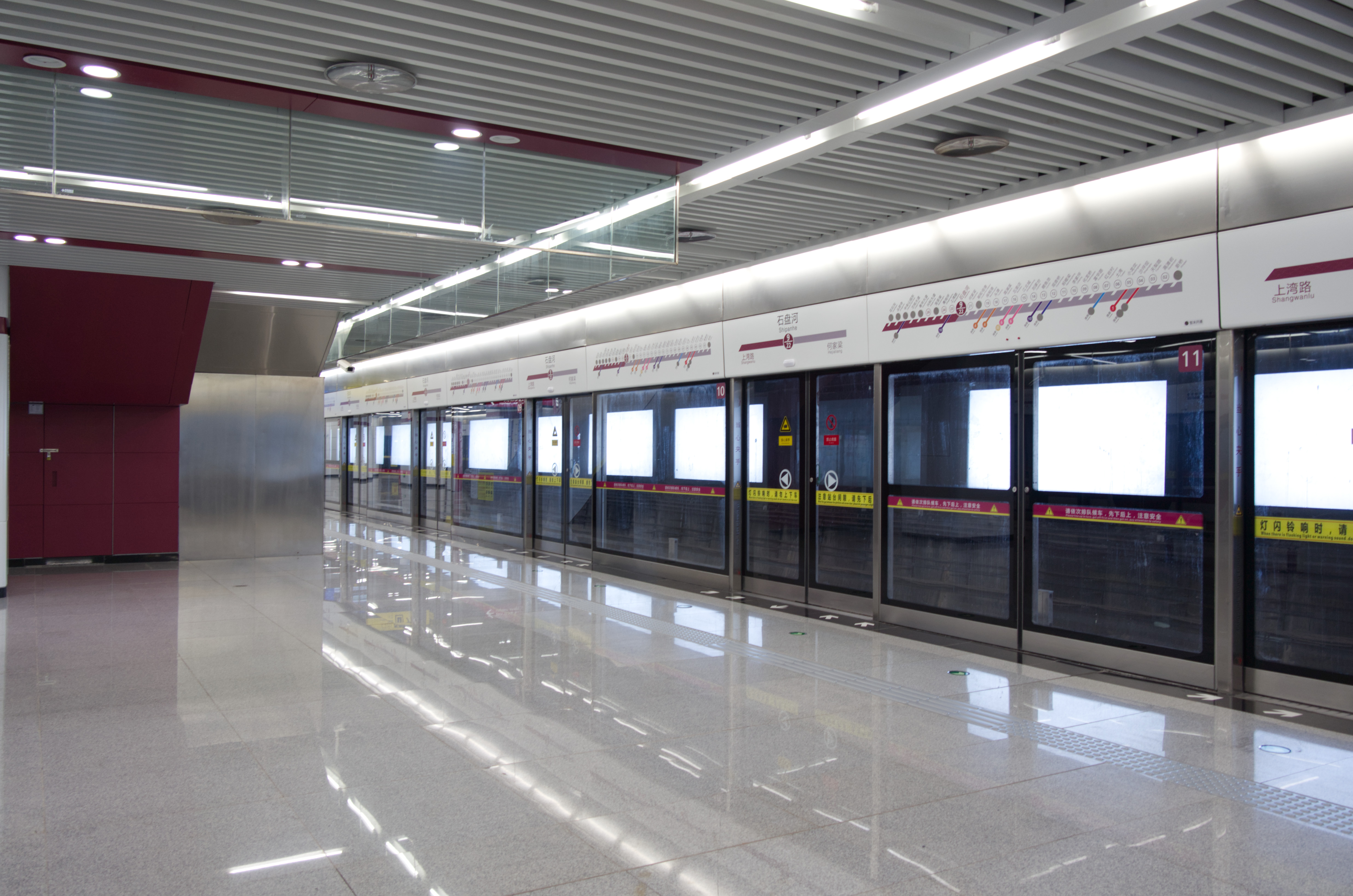
- Platform of Line 9

General information
- Location: Chongqing; China
- Coordinates: 29.6419°N 106.5939°E
- Operator: Chongqing Rail Transit Corp., Ltd
- Line: Line 9
- Platforms: 2 (1 island platform)

Construction
- Structure type: Underground

Other information
- Station code: /

History
- Opened: 25 January 2022

Services
Preceding station	Chongqing Rail Transit	Following station
Hejialiang towards Gaotanyan	Line 9	Shangwanlu towards Huashigou
Location

Shipanhe Station is a station on Line 9 of Chongqing Rail Transit in Chongqing municipality, China, which opened in 2022. It is located in Yubei District.

Situated under Shangguo Road, the station spans two levels, and is located around 1 kilometre from the Chongqing Crocodile Center, a popular tourist destination.
