= Changhe station (Chongqing Rail Transit) =

Rail station in Chongqing, China

Changhe 长河
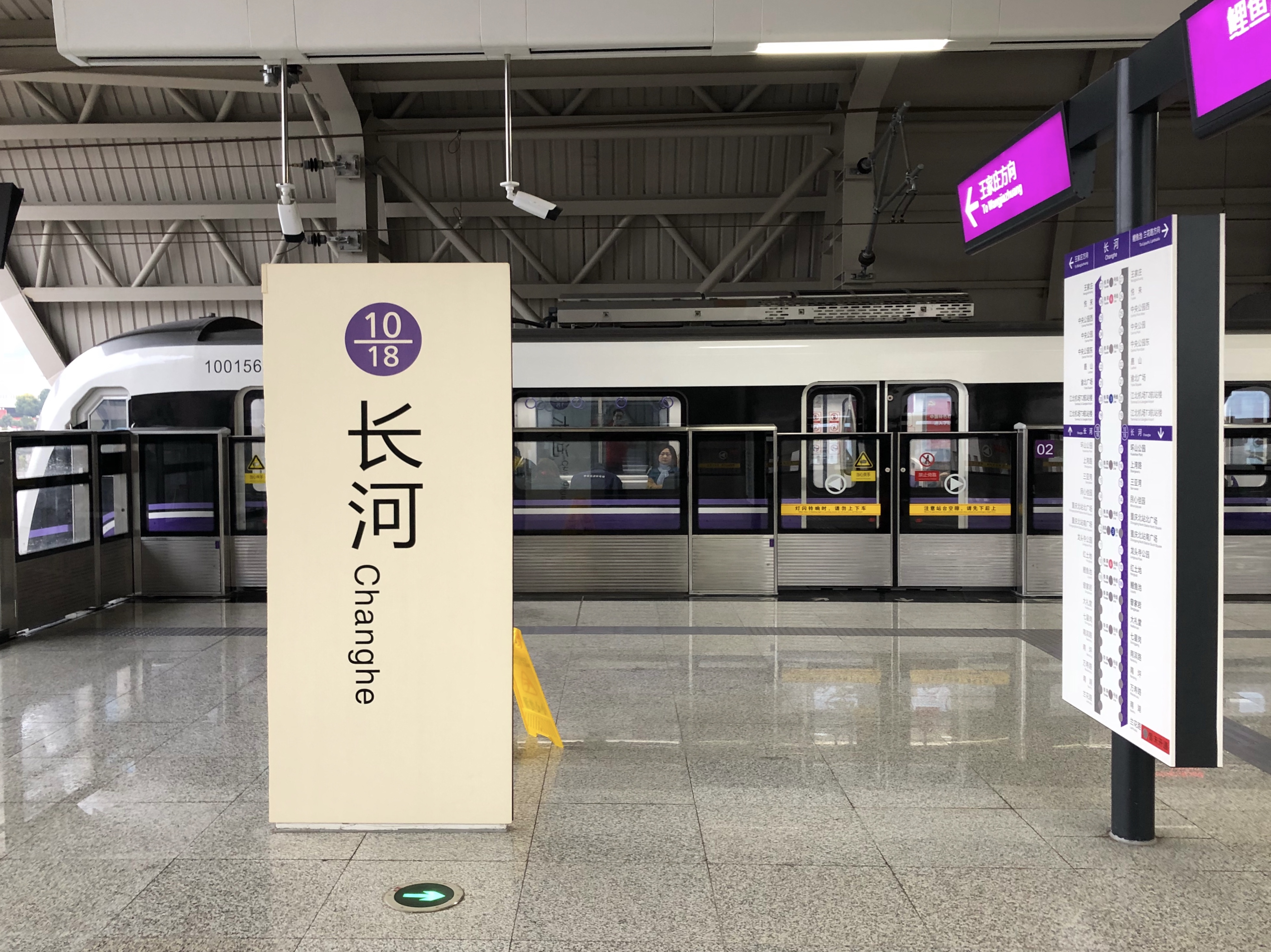
- Station Platform

General information
- Location: Yubei District, Chongqing; China
- Coordinates: 29.67662°N 106.62566°E
- Operator: Chongqing Rail Transit Corp., Ltd
- Line: Line 10
- Platforms: 2 (1 island platform)
- Connections: Bus interchange

Construction
- Structure type: Elevated
- Accessible: Yes

Other information
- Station code: /

History
- Opened: 28 December 2017; 8 years ago

Services
Preceding station	Chongqing Rail Transit	Following station
Huanshan Park towards Lanhualu	Line 10	Terminal 3 of Jiangbei Airport towards Wangjiazhuang
Location

Changhe is a metro station of Line 10 of Chongqing Rail Transit in Yubei District of Chongqing Municipality, China.

It serves the area surrounding the Industrial Zone of Taiwanese Business People.

The station opened on 28th of December 2017 and is the only above ground/elevated station on Line 10's Phase I project.

== Station structure ==
=== Line 10 platform ===
Platform Layout

An island platform is used for Line 10 trains travelling in both directions.

To Line 10 Lanhualu	←	10/18	←
	Island Platform Doors open on the left
	→	10/18	→	To Line 10 Wangjiazhuang

== Exits ==
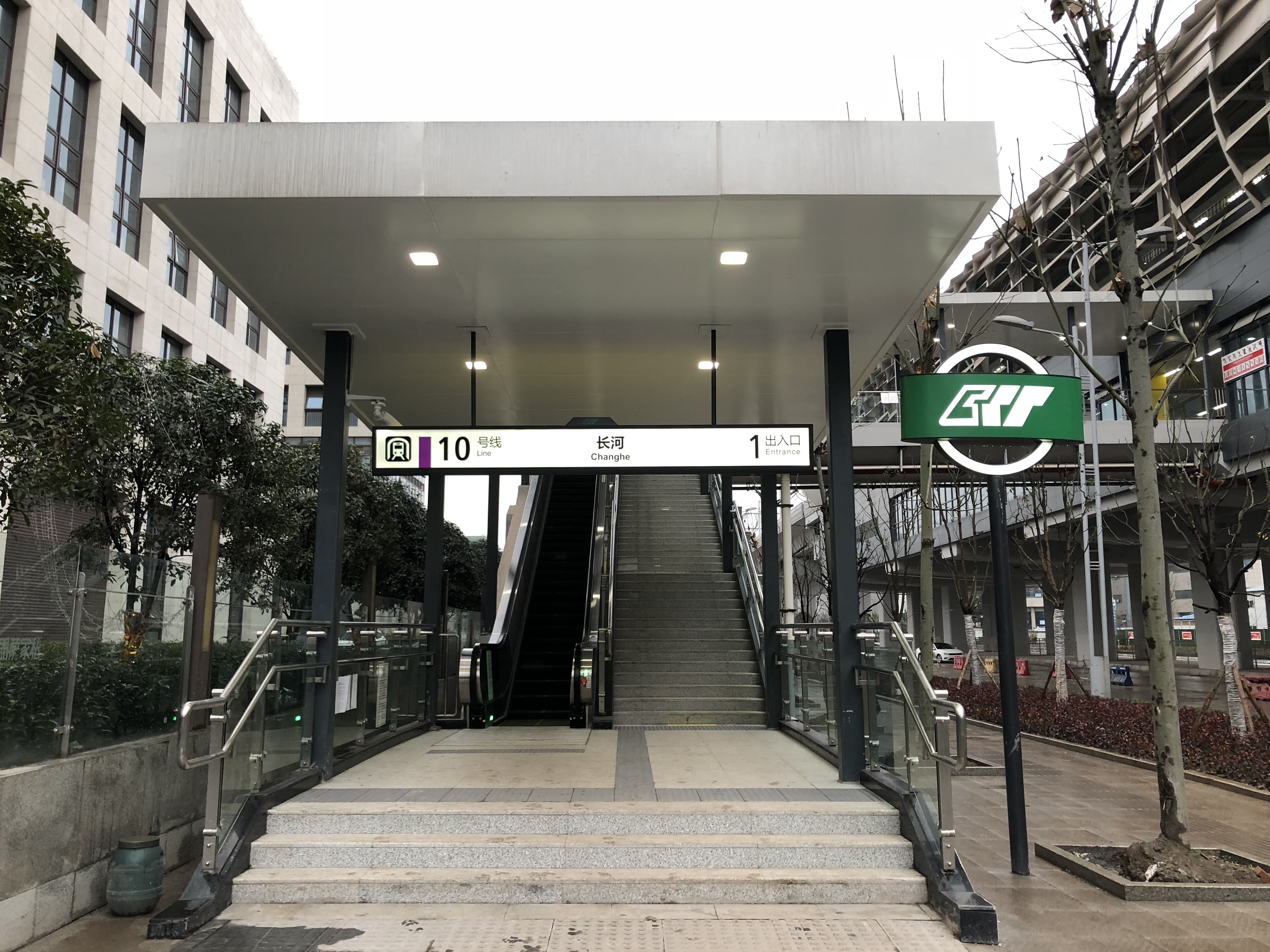
Exit 1 of the station

There are a total of 2 entrances/exits for the station.

== Surroundings ==
=== Nearby places ===
- The Industrial Zone of Taiwanese Business People
- Smart Internet Industrial Zone
- Lianggang Avenue

=== Nearby stations ===
- Terminal 3 of Jiangbei Airport station (a Line 10 Station)
- Huanshan Park station (a Line 10 station)

== See also ==
- Chongqing Rail Transit (CRT)
- Line 10 (CRT)
