= Line 10 (Chongqing Rail Transit) =

Metro line of Chongqing Rail Transit

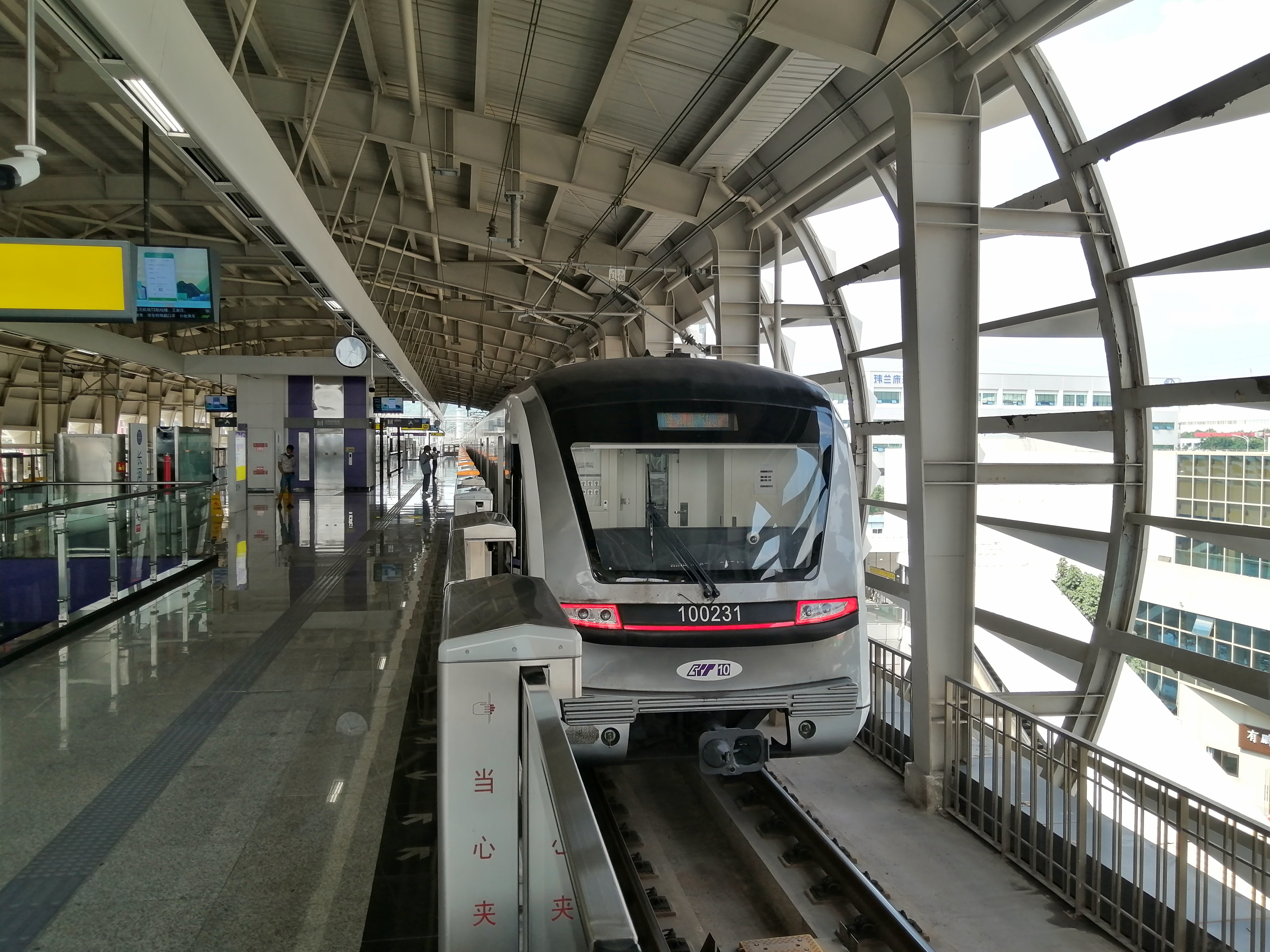
- A train of Line 10 at Changhe station

Overview
- Native name: 重庆轨道交通10号线
- Status: Operational
- Line number: 10
- Locale: Chongqing, China
- Termini: Wangjiazhuang; Lanhualu
- Stations: 27

Service
- Type: Rapid transit
- System: Chongqing Rail Transit
- Operator(s): Chongqing Rail Transit (Group) Co., Ltd.

History
- Opened: 28 December 2017; 8 years ago

Technical
- Line length: 43.26 km (26.88 miles) (operational)
- Num of tracks: 2
- Track gauge: 1,435 mm (4 ft 8 1/2 in)
- Electrification: 1500 V DC overhead line
- Operating speed: 100 km/h (62 mph) (Peak)

Line 10 of Chongqing Rail Transit is a rapid transit line that opened on 28 December 2017. Rapid trains started operating on Line 10 in June 2020.

The trains on Line 10, which links Jiangbei Airport and Chongqing North railway station, are equipped with a luggage rack on each car.

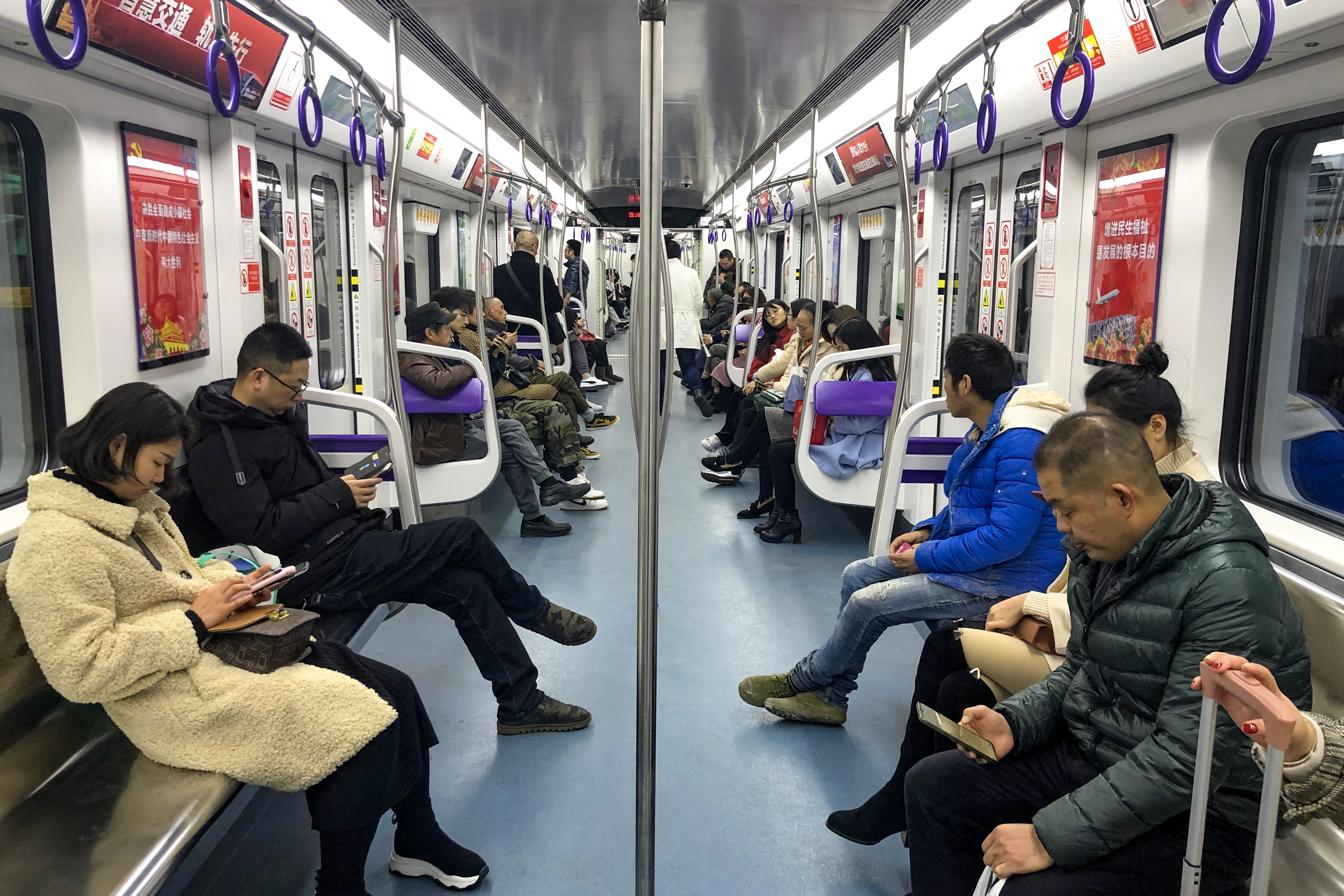
Interior of a Line 10 train

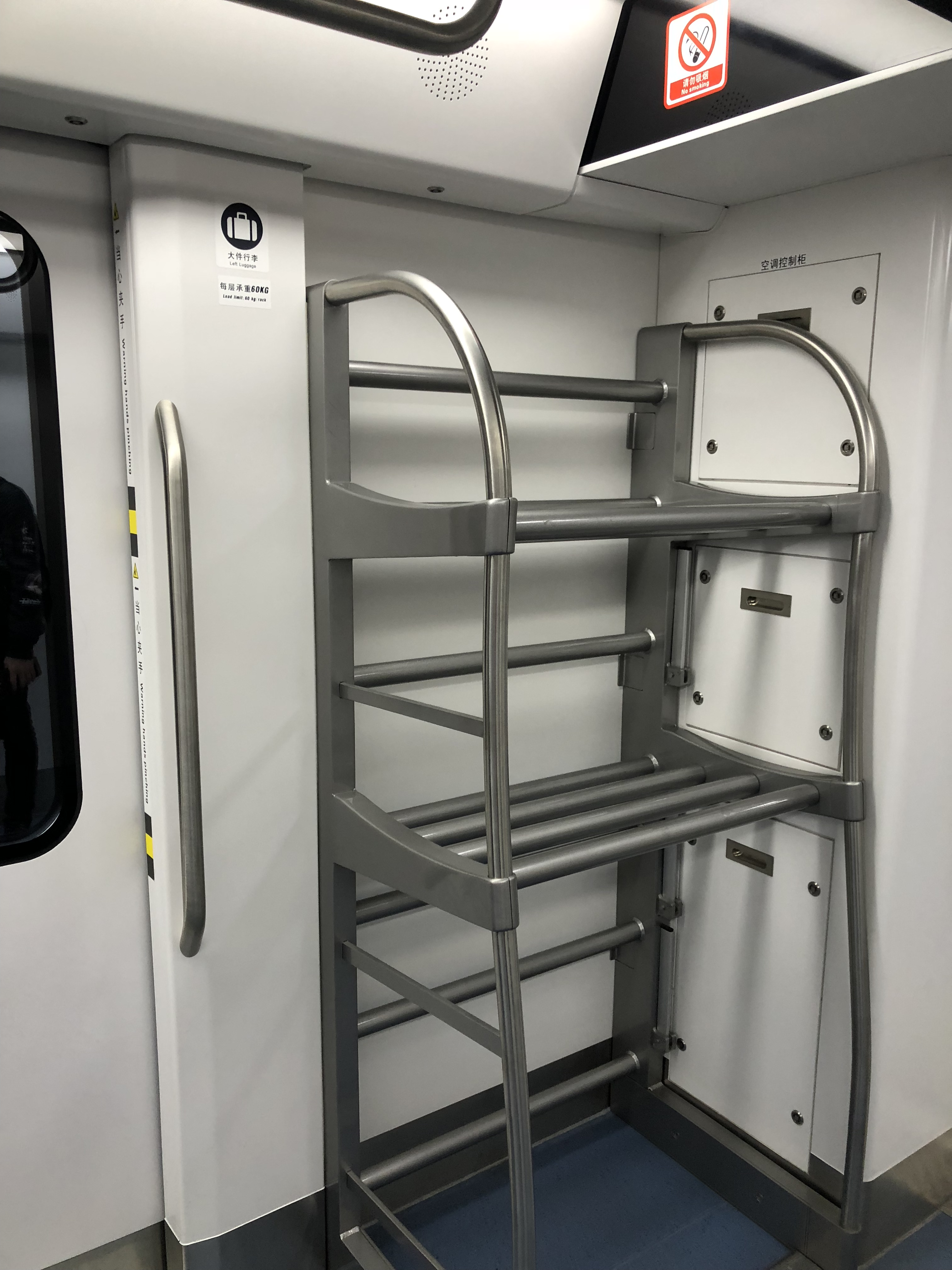
Luggage rack

== Opening timeline ==
Segment	Commencement	Length	Station(s)	Name
Wangjiazhuang – Liyuchi	28 December 2017	33.7 km (20.94 mi)	18	Phase 1
Chongqing North Station South Square	28 December 2018	infill station	1	
Liyuchi – Houbao	18 January 2023	6 km (3.7 mi)	4	Phase 2 (initial section)
Houbao – Lanhualu	30 November 2023	4.75 km (2.95 mi)	4	Phase 2 (remain section)

== Stations (north to south) ==
Route of Line 10

Service routes		Station №	Station name		Connections	Distance km		Location
R	L	Station №	English	Chinese	Connections	Distance km		Location
●	●	/	Wangjiazhuang	王家庄	Line 6	-	0	Liangjiang
|	●	/	Yuelai	悦来	Line 6	2.04	2.04	Liangjiang
●	●	/	Central Park West	中央公园西	Line 5	2.71	4.75	Liangjiang
|	●	/	Central Park	中央公园		1.09	5.84	Liangjiang
|	●	/	Central Park East	中央公园东	Line 9	0.82	6.66	Liangjiang
|	●	/	Lushan	鹿山		1.64	8.30	Liangjiang
|	●	/	Yubei Square	渝北广场		2.05	10.35	Liangjiang
●	●	/	Terminal 2 of Jiangbei Airport	江北机场T2航站楼	Line 3 CKG	0.74	11.09	Liangjiang
●	●	/	Terminal 3 of Jiangbei Airport	江北机场T3航站楼	15 CKG	2.22	13.31	Liangjiang
|	●	/	Changhe	长河		5.31	18.62	Liangjiang
|	●	/	Huanshan Park	环山公园		1.85	20.47	Liangjiang
●	●	/	Shangwanlu	上湾路	Line 9	1.67	22.14	Liangjiang
|	●	/	Sanyawan	三亚湾		2.74	24.88	Liangjiang
|	●	/	Minxinjiayuan	民心佳园		2.08	26.96	Liangjiang
●	●	/	Chongqing North Station North Square (Note: The former translation is North/South Square of Chongqingbei Railway Station, which has been replaced since the opening of Line 10's station)	重庆北站北广场	Line 4 YW CUW	2.61	29.57	Liangjiang
●	●	/	Chongqing North Station South Square	重庆北站南广场	Line 3 Loop line YW CUW	0.60	30.17	Liangjiang
|	●	/	Longtousi Park	龙头寺公园		0.87	31.04	Liangjiang
●	●	/	Hongtudi	红土地	Line 6	1.63	32.67	Liangjiang
●	●	/	Liyuchi	鲤鱼池	Line 9	1.09	33.76	Liangjiang
●	●	/	Zengjiayan	曾家岩	Line 2	0.82	34.58	Yuzhong
|	●	/	Chongqing People's Auditorium	大礼堂		0.92	35.5	Yuzhong
●	●	/	Qixinggang	七星岗	Line 1 18	0.89	36.39	Yuzhong
|	●	/	Houbao	后堡		2.12	38.51	Nan'an
|	|	/	Nanping	南坪	Line 3 27	1.22	39.73	Nan'an
●	●	/	Wanshoulu	万寿路		0.98	40.71	Nan'an
|	●	/	Nanhu	南湖	Loop line	1.27	41.98	Nan'an
●	●	/	Lanhualu	兰花路		1.28	43.26	Nan'an
