= Min'an Avenue station =

Metro station in Chongqing, China

Min'an Ave. 民安大道
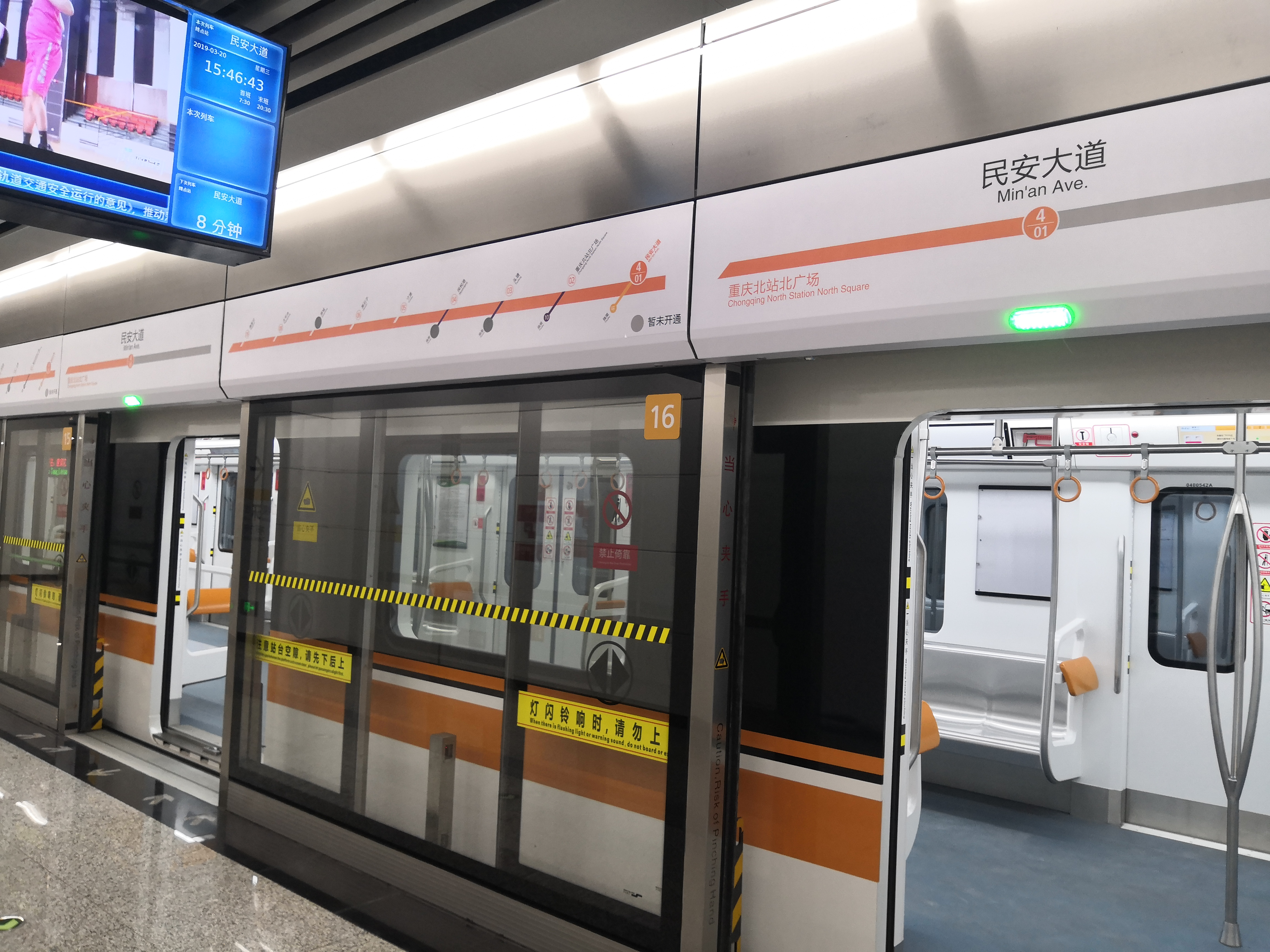
- The platform of Line 4

General information
- Location: Taishan Avenue (泰山大道) × Min'an Avenue; Liangjiang New Area, Chongqing; China
- Coordinates: 29°36′41″N 106°31′27″E
- Operator: Chongqing Rail Transit Corp., Ltd
- Lines: Loop line Line 4
- Platforms: 4 (2 island platforms)

Construction
- Structure type: Underground
- Platform levels: 2
- Accessible: Yes

Other information
- Station code: / /

History
- Opened: 11 January 2019

Services
Preceding station	Chongqing Rail Transit	Following station
Honghudonglu Counter-clockwise	Loop line	Chongqing N. Station S. Square Clockwise
Jiazhoulu towards Shimahelijiao	Line 4	Chongqing N. Station N. Square towards Huangling
Ranjiaba towards Tiaodeng	Line 4 Express	Chongqing N. Station N. Square towards Tangjiatuo
Location

Min'an Ave. station (Chinese: 民安大道站; pinyin: Mín'āndàdào zhàn) is an interchange station of the Loop Line and Line 4 of Chongqing Rail Transit in Liangjiang New Area of Chongqing Municipality, China. The station opened on 11 January 2019 and Line 4 Western extension to Shimahelijiao opened on 10 February 2026. It serves the area surrounding Min'an Avenue, including nearby office buildings and residential blocks.

== Station structure ==
2 island platforms are built for Loop Line trains & Line 4 trains.
The Western extension of Line 4 opened on 10 February 2026, the directions of its platforms will be reversed. The one on B2 used for all eastbound trains (towards Huangling), while the other one on B3 will be used for westbound trains (towards Shimahelijiao) only.

B1	Concourse	Customer service, Vending machines
B2		Loop line clockwise loop (Chongqing North Station South Square)
B2	Island platform
B2		Line 4 to Huangling (Chongqing North Station North Square)
B3		Loop line counterclockwise loop (Honghudonglu)
B3	Island platform
B3		Line 4 to Shimahelijiao (Jiazhoulu)

== Exits ==
There are a total of 4 entrances/exits currently in use for the station. Exits 2, 4A & 4B are under construction.

- 1A: Min'an Avenue, Tianlong Road (天龙路)
- 1B: Min'an Avenue, Taihu West Road (太湖西路)
- 3A: Taishan Avenue, Yungang Road (云岗路)
- 3B: Taishan Avenue
- 4A: Min'an Avenue
