= Wangjiazhuang station =

Chongqing Rail Transit station

Wangjiazhuang 王家庄
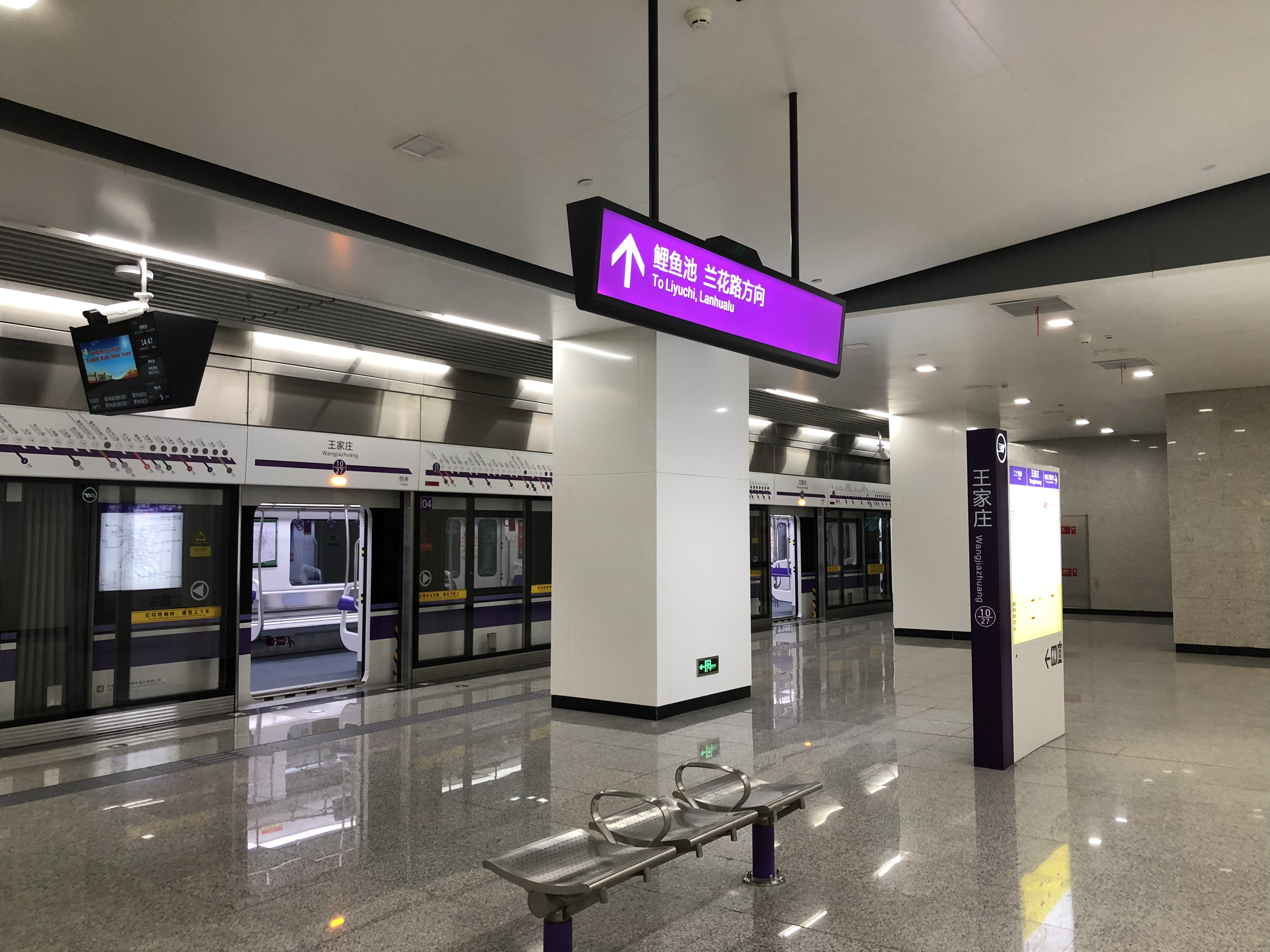

General information
- Location: Chongqing; China
- Coordinates: 29.74649°N 106.5418°E
- Operator: Chongqing Rail Transit Corp., Ltd
- Lines: Line 6 (International Expo Branch); Line 10
- Platforms: 4 (2 island platforms)

Construction
- Structure type: Underground

Other information
- Station code: / / /

History
- Opened: 28 December 2017; 8 years ago (Line 10); 31 December 2020; 5 years ago (Line 6 International Expo Branch)

Services
Preceding station	Chongqing Rail Transit	Following station
Yuelai towards Lijia	Line 6 International Expo branch	Qingxihe towards Shaheba
Yuelai towards Lanhualu	Line 10	Terminus
Terminal 2 of Jiangbei Airport towards Lanhualu	Line 10 Rapid	Terminus
Location

Wangjiazhuang Station is a cross-platform interchange station between Line 10 and International Expo Branch of Line 6 of Chongqing Rail Transit in Chongqing municipality, China. It is located in Yubei District and opened in 2017.

== Station structure ==
A cross-platform interchange is provided between Line 6 (International Expo branch) and Line 10.

B1; Concourse	Exits, customer service, vending machines
B2; Platforms	Line 6 – International Expo branch to Lijia (Yuelai)
B2; Platforms	Island platform
B2; Platforms	Line 10 to Lanhualu (Yuelai)
B2; Platforms	Line 10 termination platform
B2; Platforms	Island platform
B2; Platforms	Line 6 – International Expo branch to Shaheba (Qingxihe)
