= Tiansheng =

Tiansheng may refer to:

- Tiansheng, Sichuan (天生镇), a town in Xuanhan County, Sichuan, China
- Tiansheng Subdistrict (天生街道), Beibei District, Chongqing, China

== Historical eras ==
- Tiansheng (天聖; 1023–1032), era name used by Emperor Renzong of Song
- Tiansheng (天盛; 1149–1170), era name used by Emperor Renzong of Western Xia

== See also ==
- List of Chinese eras
