= Southwest University station =

Chongqing Rail Transit station

Southwest University 西南大学
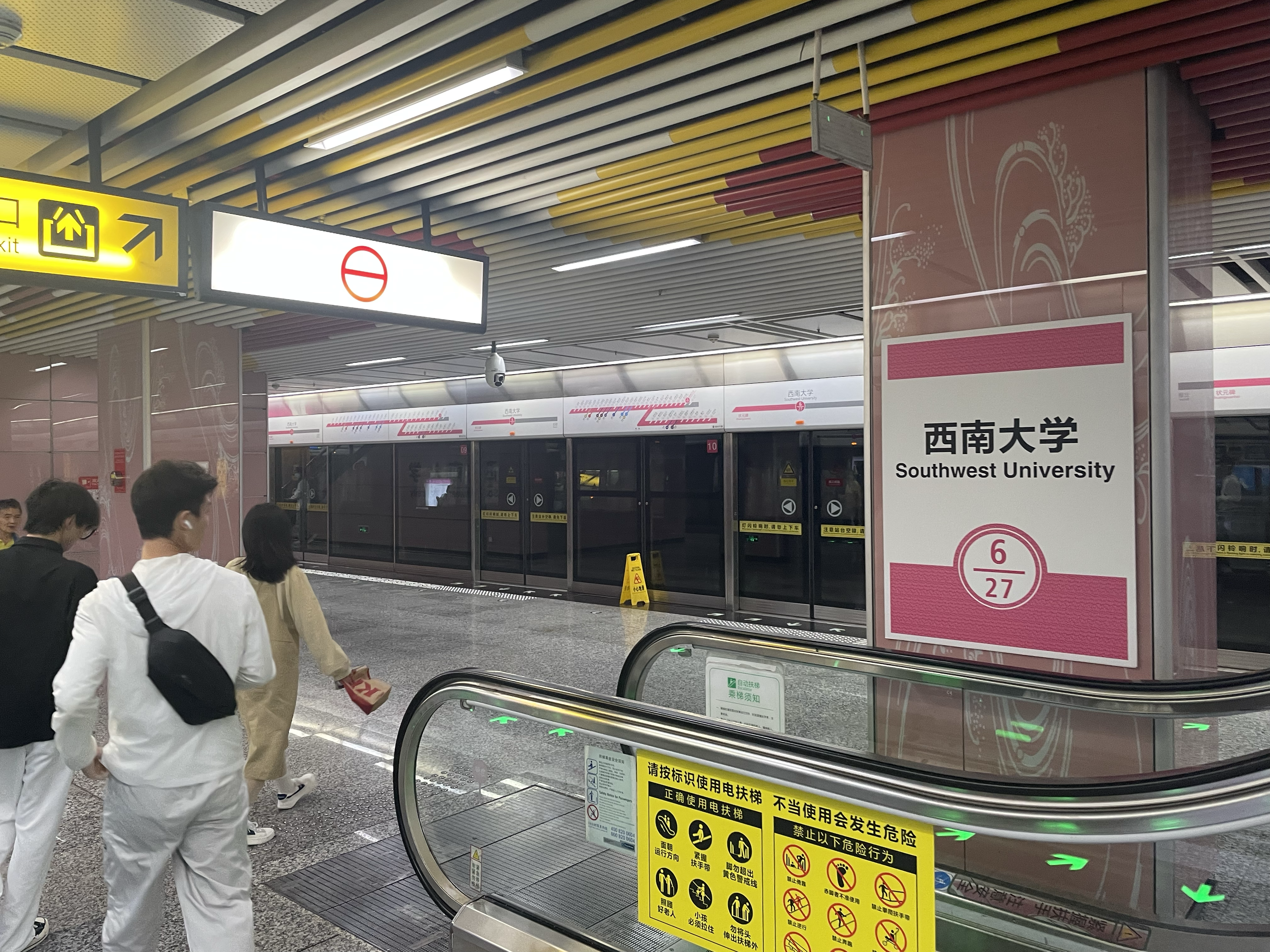

General information
- Location: Chongqing; China
- Coordinates: 29.8188°N 106.4196°E
- Operated by: Chongqing Rail Transit Corp., Ltd
- Line: Line 6
- Platforms: 2 (1 island platform)

Construction
- Structure type: Underground

Other information
- Station code: 6/27

History
- Opened: 28 September 2014; 11 years ago

Services
Preceding station	Chongqing Rail Transit	Following station
Zhuangyuanbei towards Chayuan	Line 6	Beibei Terminus
Location

Southwest University Station is a station on Line 6 of Chongqing Rail Transit in Chongqing municipality, China, which is located in Beibei District, adjacent to the Southwest University. It opened in 2014.

The former name of this station is Tiansheng (Chinese: 天生), which has been replaced in 2019.

== Station structure ==
B1; Concourse	Exits, Customer service, Vending machines
B2; Platforms	Line 6 to Chayuan (Zhuangyuanbei)
B2; Platforms	Island platform
B2; Platforms	Line 6 to Beibei (Terminus)
