= Xiangjiagang station =

Chongqing Rail Transit station

Xiangjiagang 向家岗
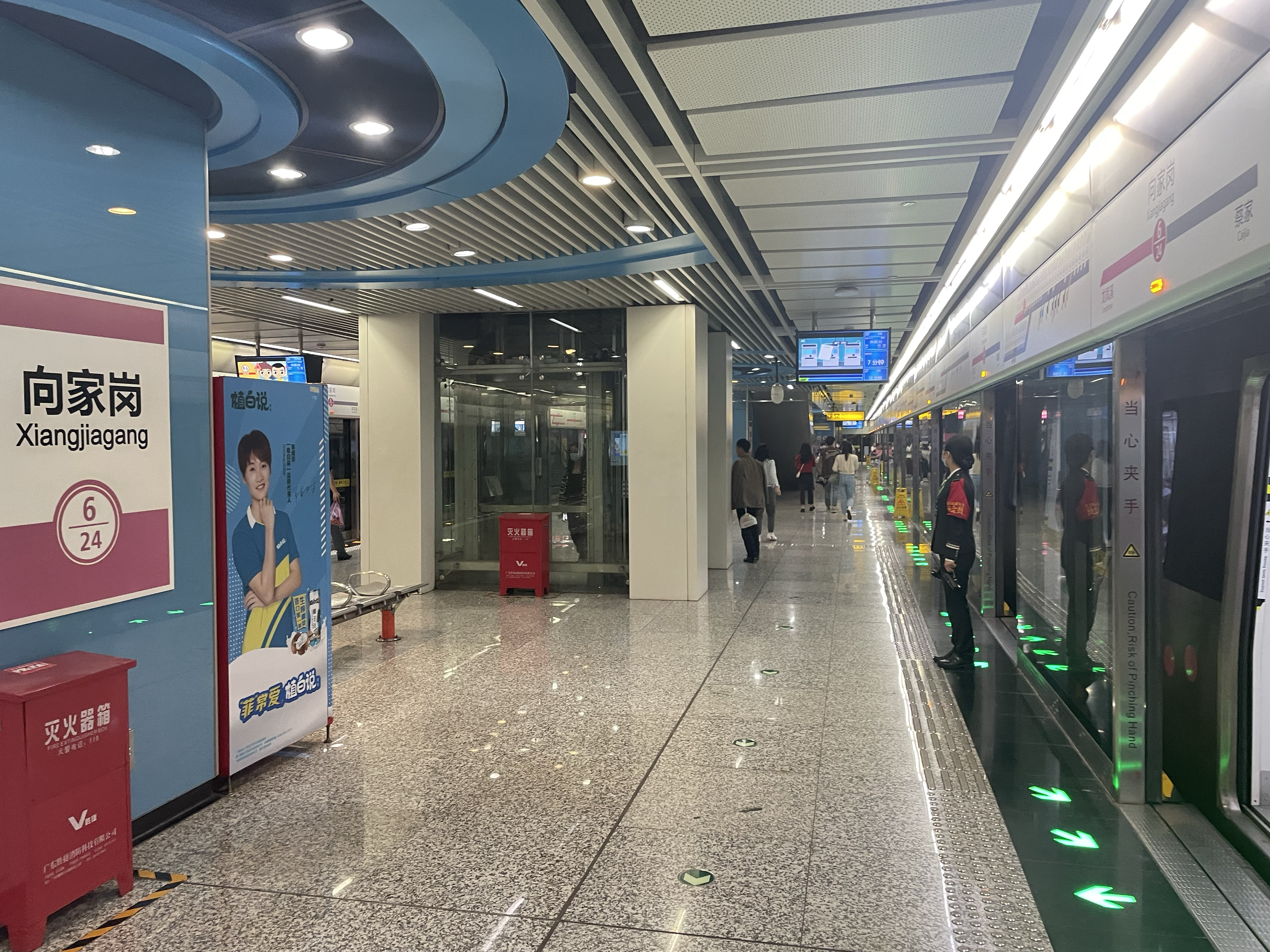

General information
- Location: Chongqing; China
- Coordinates: 29.74177°N 106.46932°E
- Operated by: Chongqing Rail Transit Corp., Ltd
- Line: Line 6
- Platforms: 2 (1 island platform)

Construction
- Structure type: Underground

Other information
- Station code: 6/24

History
- Opened: 26 November 2014; 11 years ago

Services
Preceding station	Chongqing Rail Transit	Following station
Caijia towards Chayuan	Line 6	Longfengxi towards Beibei
Location

Xiangjiagang is a station on Line 6 of Chongqing Rail Transit in Chongqing Municipality, China. It is located in Beibei District. It opened in 2014.

== Station structure ==
B2; Concourse	Exits, Customer service, Vending machines
B3; Platforms	Line 6 to Beibei (Longfengxi)
B3; Platforms	Island platform
B3; Platforms	Line 6 to Chayuan (Caijia)
