= Longfengxi station =

Chongqing Rail Transit station

Longfengxi 龙凤溪
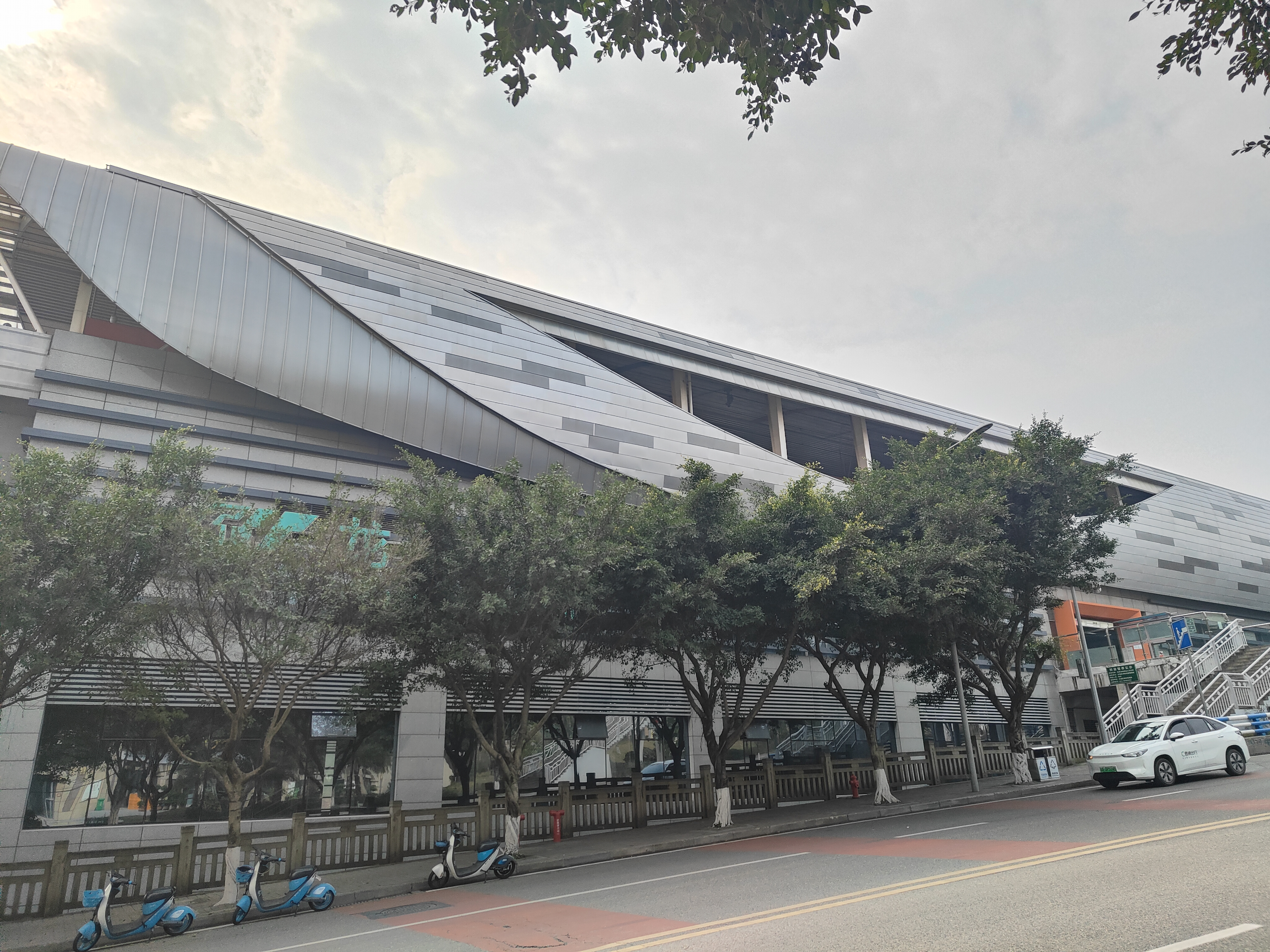

General information
- Location: Chongqing; China
- Operated by: Chongqing Rail Transit Corp., Ltd
- Line: Line 6
- Platforms: 2 (1 island platform)

Construction
- Structure type: Elevated

Other information
- Station code: /

History
- Opened: 31 December 2013; 12 years ago

Services
Preceding station	Chongqing Rail Transit	Following station
Xiangjiagang towards Chayuan	Line 6	Zhuangyuanbei towards Beibei
Location

Longfengxi is a station on Line 6 of Chongqing Rail Transit in Chongqing Municipality, China. It is located in Beibei District. It opened in 2013.

== Station structure ==
4F; Platforms	Line 6 to Beibei (Zhuangyuanbei)
4F; Platforms	Island platform
4F; Platforms	Line 6 to Chayuan (Xiangjiagang)
3F; Concourse	Exits, Customer service, Vending machines, Toilets
