= Xida =

Xida (西大) may refer to:

- Guangxi University, a public university in Nanning, Guangxi, China
- Northwest University, a public university in Xi'an, Shaanxi, China
- Southwest University, a public university in Beibei, Chongqing, China
