= Caijia station =

Chongqing Rail Transit station

Caijia 蔡家
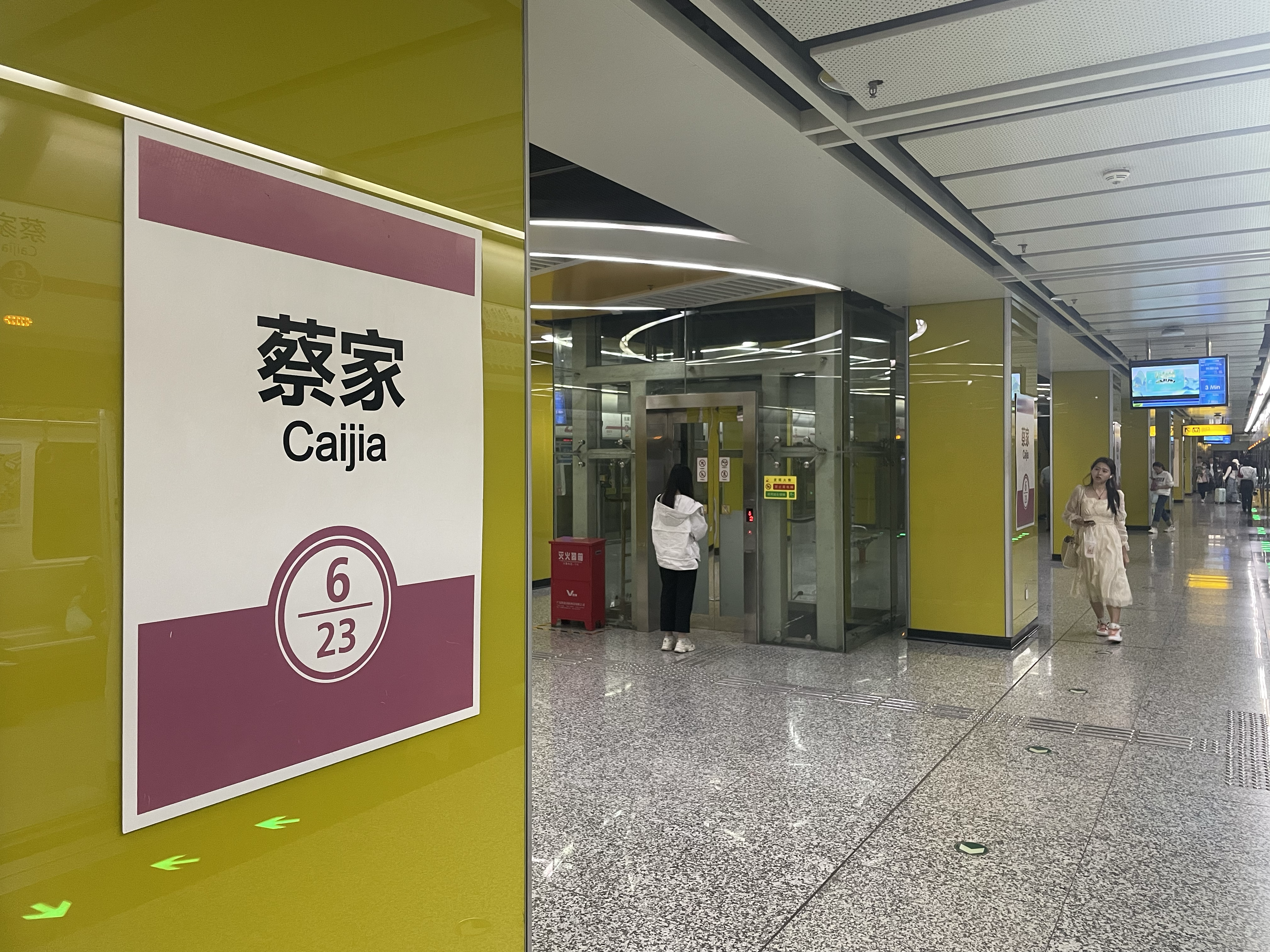

General information
- Location: Chongqing; China
- Coordinates: 29.73887°N 106.48769°E
- Operated by: Chongqing Rail Transit Corp., Ltd
- Line: Line 6
- Platforms: 2 (1 island platform)

Construction
- Structure type: Underground

Other information
- Station code: 6/23

History
- Opened: 31 December 2013; 12 years ago

Services
Preceding station	Chongqing Rail Transit	Following station
Caojiawan towards Chayuan	Line 6	Xiangjiagang towards Beibei
Location

Caijia is a station on Line 6 of Chongqing Rail Transit in Chongqing Municipality, China. It is located in Beibei District. It opened in 2013.

== Station structure ==
B1; Concourse	Exits, Customer service, Vending machines
B2; Platforms	Line 6 to Beibei (Xiangjiagang)
B2; Platforms	Island platform
B2; Platforms	Line 6 to Chayuan (Caojiawan)
