= Caojiawan station =

Metro station in Chongqing, China

Caojiawan 曹家湾
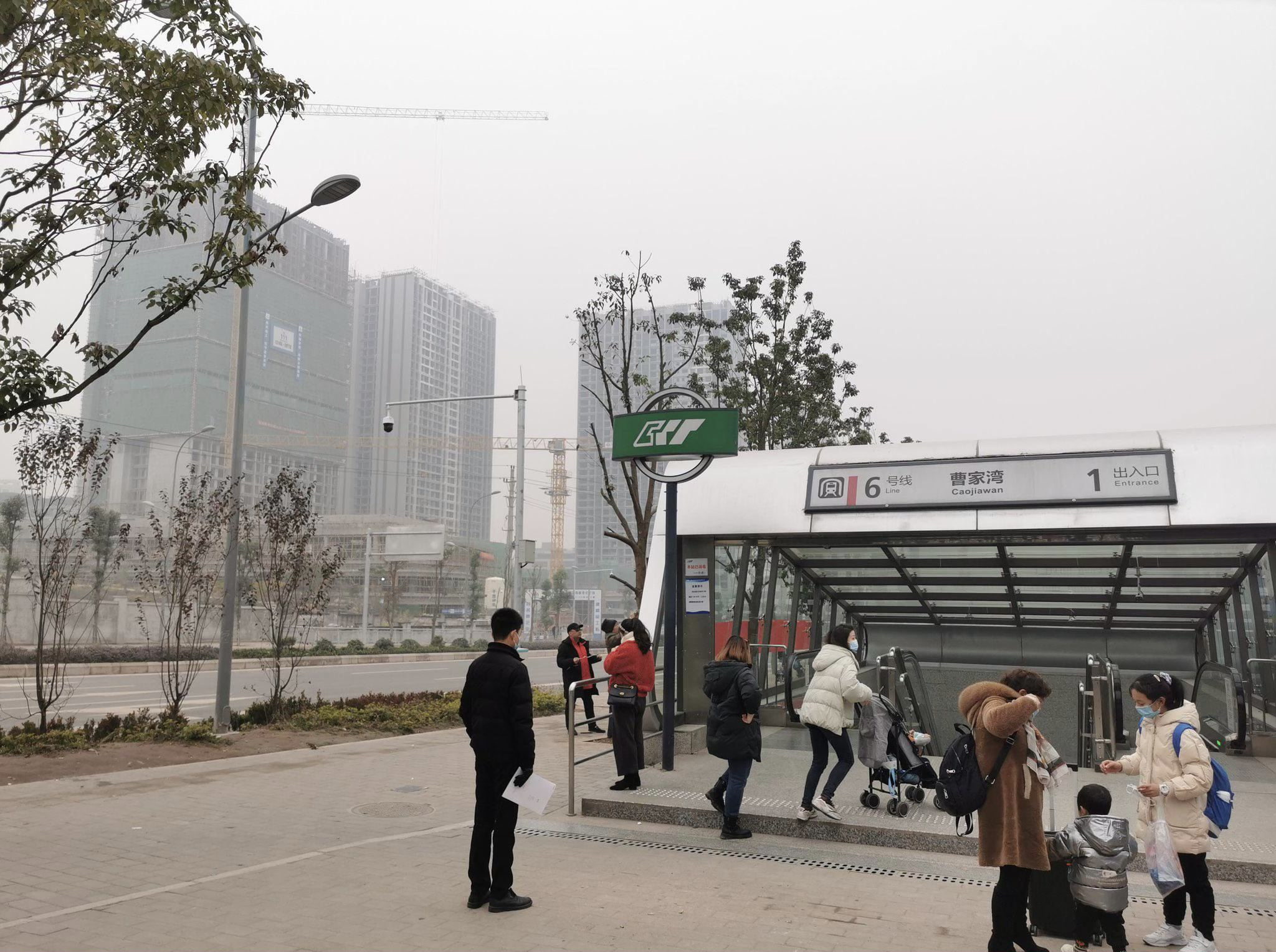

General information
- Location: Beibei District, Chongqing; China
- Coordinates: 29°43′25″N 106°29′25″E
- Operated by: Chongqing Rail Transit Corp., Ltd
- Line: Line 6
- Platforms: 2 (1 island platform)

Construction
- Structure type: Underground

Other information
- Station code: 6/22

History
- Opened: 26 October 2015; 10 years ago

Services
Preceding station	Chongqing Rail Transit	Following station
Jinshansi towards Chayuan	Line 6	Caijia towards Beibei
Location

Caojiawan is a station on Line 6 of the Chongqing Rail Transit system in Chongqing, China. The station, located in Beibei District north of the Jialing River, opened in 2015 as an infill station on Line 6.

For the first five years after the time of building, all three entrances surfaced in barren fields that were overgrown with weeds. In summer 2017, only one entrance was open and the station entrances became the subject of national and international attention, used as a sign of China's rapid rail expansion. The avenue around the station was mostly completed by November 2019, with it opening in 2020.

== Station structure ==
B1; Concourse	Exits, Customer service, Vending machines
B2; Platforms	Line 6 to Beibei (Caijia)
B2; Platforms	Island platform
B2; Platforms	Line 6 to Chayuan (Jinshansi)
