= Zhuangyuanbei station =

Chongqing Rail Transit station

Zhuangyuanbei 状元碑
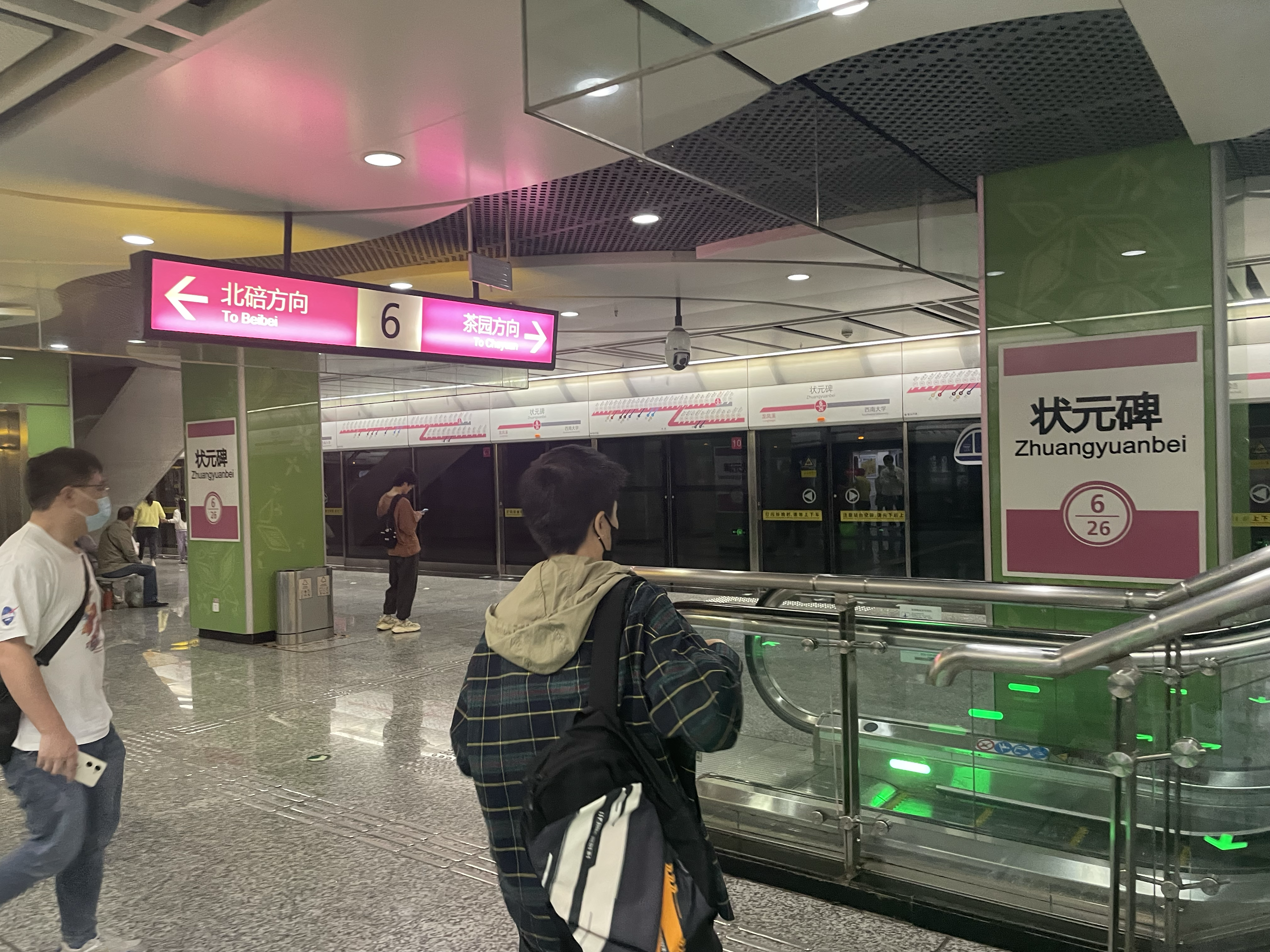
- The platform of Line 6 at Zhuangyuanbei Station

General information
- Location: Chongqing; China
- Coordinates: 29.8056°N 106.3949°E
- Operated by: Chongqing Rail Transit Corp., Ltd
- Line: Line 6
- Platforms: 2 (1 island platform)

Construction
- Structure type: Underground

Other information
- Station code: 6/26

History
- Opened: 31 December 2013; 11 years ago

Services
Preceding station	Chongqing Rail Transit	Following station
Longfengxi towards Chayuan	Line 6	Southwest University towards Beibei
Location

Zhuangyuanbei Station is a station on Line 6 of Chongqing Rail Transit in Chongqing municipality, China.

== Station structure ==
B1; Concourse	Exits, Customer service, Vending machines
B2; Platforms	Line 6 to Chayuan (Longfengxi)
B2; Platforms	Island platform
B2; Platforms	Line 6 to Beibei (Southwest University)
