= Tiansheng Subdistrict =

Tiansheng Subdistrict 天生街道
- Subdistrict
- Location in Chongqing
- Coordinates: 29°49′43″N 106°25′56″E
- Country: People's Republic of China
- Direct-Administered Municipality: Chongqing
- District: Beibei District
- Time zone: UTC+8 (China Standard)

Tiansheng Subdistrict (Chinese: 天生街道; pinyin: Tiānshēng Jiēdào) is a subdistrict in Beibei District, Chongqing, China. As of 2020, it administers the following nine residential neighborhoods:

- Xinxing Road Community (新星路社区)
- Southwest University North Community (西南大学北社区)
- Tianshengqiao Community (天生桥社区)
- Southwest University South Community (西南大学南社区)
- Beixia Road Community (碚峡路社区)
- Longxi Road Community (龙溪路社区)
- Hehuachi Community (荷花池社区)
- Benyue Road Community (奔月路社区)
- Quanwaiyuan Community (泉外园社区)

== See also ==
- List of township-level divisions of Chongqing
