= Tiansheng, Sichuan =

Tiansheng 天生镇
- Town
- Location in Sichuan
- Coordinates: 31°15′30″N 107°45′0″E
- Country: People's Republic of China
- Province: Sichuan
- Prefecture-level city: Dazhou
- County-level city: Xuanhan County
- Time zone: UTC+8 (China Standard)

Tiansheng (Chinese: 天生; pinyin: Tiānshēng) is a town under the administration of Xuanhan County in eastern Sichuan, China. As of 2020, it administers the following two residential neighborhoods and ten villages:

Neighborhoods

- Xianqiao Community (仙桥社区)
- Donggong Community (洞宫社区)

Villages

- Tiansheng Village
- Dalugou Village (大路沟村)
- Jinbu Village (进步村)
- Youshi Village (油石村)
- Xishan Village (西山村)
- Echeng Village (峨城村)
- Xinya Village (新芽村)
- Mati Village (马蹄村)
- Minzhu Village (民主村)
- Taba Village (塔坝村)
