= Southwest University =

Public university in Beibei, Chongqing, China

Coordinates: 29.8139°N 106.4129°E

- 西南大学
- Former names: Southwest China Normal University; Southwest Agricultural University
- Type: National university
- Established: 1906; 120 years ago
- Affiliations: Double First Class University, 211 Project
- President: Zhang Weiguo
- Administrative staff: 2,650
- Students: 60000
- Undergraduates: 34637
- Postgraduates: 5731
- Doctoral students: 819
- Other students: 19000
- Location: Beibei District, Chongqing, China
- Campus: Urban 9,600 Chinese mu, 600 hectares
- Nickname: SWU
- Website: swu.edu.cn

Southwest University (SWU) is a public university in Beibei, Chongqing, China. It is affiliated with the Ministry of Education, and co-funded by the Ministry of Education, the Ministry of Agriculture and Rural Affairs, and the Chongqing Municipal People's Government. The university is part of Project 211 and the Double First-Class Construction.

== Overview ==
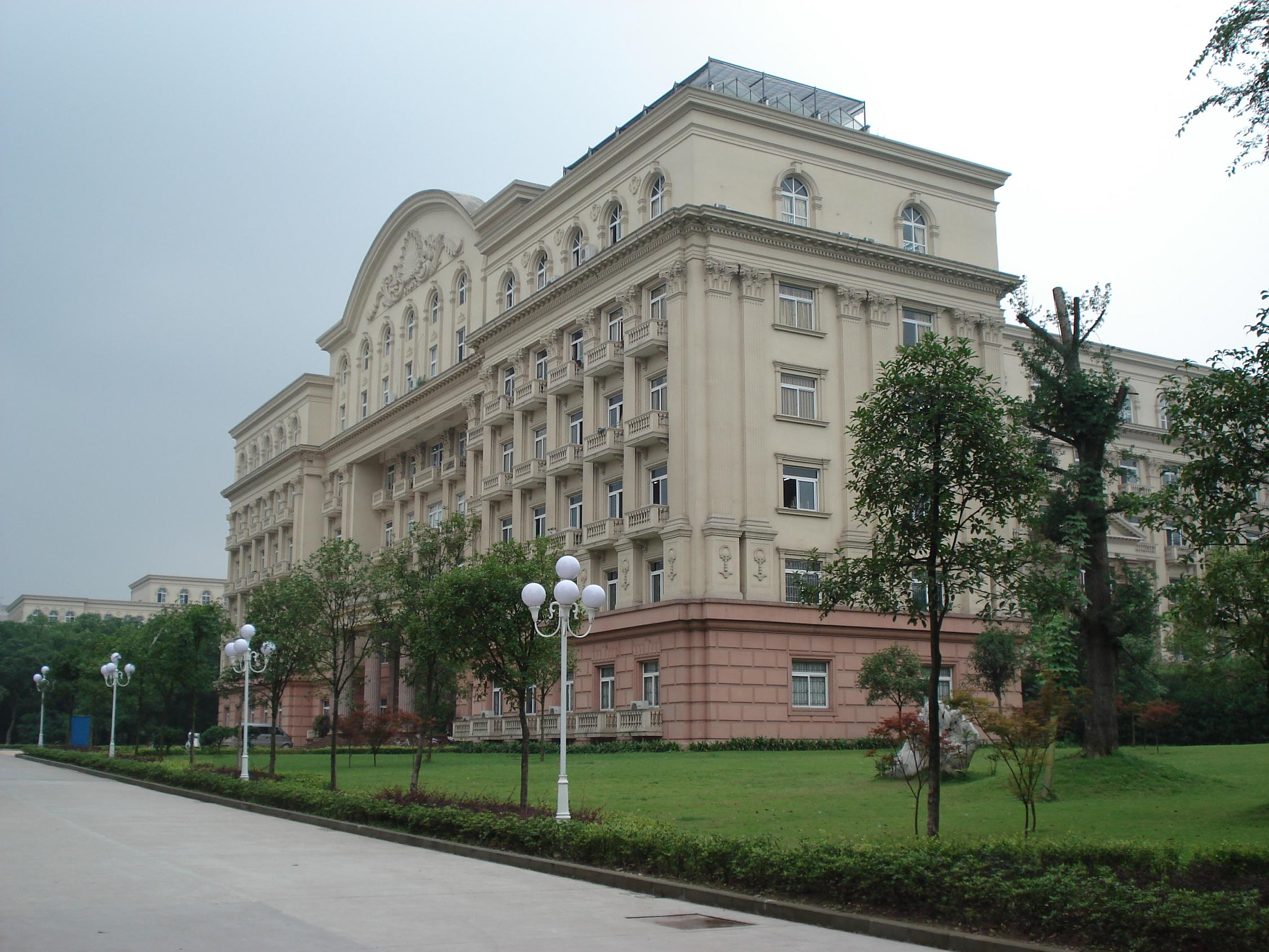
No. 33 Teaching Building

Southwest University (SWU) is a comprehensive university sponsored by the Ministry of Education of China. It was founded in July 2005 with the merger of Southwest Normal University and Southwest Agricultural University, both of whose histories are over 100 years. It is one of the "Double First Class University Plan" and abolished "211 Project" universities which get preferential support for their development and construction from the Central Government of China. The total number of the students at SWU is more than 80,000, of which 50,000 are full-time students. There are also many international students working for their bachelor's, master's or doctor's degrees and other advanced studies in SWU every year.

SWU is located in Chongqing municipality, which is the central city in the Western China Development Project. Southwest University began to enroll international students in the 1950s. It is also one of the universities designated by the Ministry of Education to enroll Chinese Government Scholarship students. Most of the international students in SWU are now majoring in Chinese language, Pedagogy, Psychology, Economics, Business in China, Chinese Minorities Studies, Life Sciences, Food Sciences, Agriculture, Fine Arts, and Chinese Martial Arts etc. The qualified international students in Southwest University have the chance to get Chongqing Mayor Scholarships and SWU Excellent Overseas Students Scholarship. In addition, SWU is donating a share of Integrative Insurance for Medical Care and Accidents for every long-term overseas student.

The university covers a broad range of academic disciplines including philosophy, economics, law, pedagogics, literature, history, science, engineering, agriculture and management. It offers 40 national key disciplines, 66 doctoral programs, 9 postdoctoral programs, 159 master's programs and 97 bachelor's programs. SWU is known nationwide for its teaching methodological and agricultural studies. Studies in Pedagogics, psychology and agriculture have distinguished predominance in China; The Research of Silkworm genome is top in the world. A great deal of creative research works have been achieved in the fields like Zero Tillage Cultivation, Silkworm Genome, Studies on the Education and Psychological Behavior of Minorities in Southwestern China, and the Research on Human Time Cognition.

== Colleges and departments ==
- School of Marxism Studies
- College of Political Science and Public Management
- School of Law
- College of Animal Science and Technology
- College of Plant Protection
- College of Agronomy and Biotechnology
- College of Horticulture and Landscaping
- College of Food Science
- College of Sericulture, Textile and Biomass Sciences (merged from the former College of Textiles and Garment& College of Biotechnology)
- College of Engineering and Technology
- College of Computer and Information Science and College of Software
- College of Resources and Environment
- School of Material Science and Engineering
- School of Geographical Science
- College of Life Sciences and Biological Technology
- College of Chemistry and Chemical Engineering
- College of Physics and Technology
- College of Electronic Information Engineering
- School of Mathematics and Statistics
- College of Historic Cultures and College of Nationalities
- School of Fine Arts
- College of Music
- College of International Studies
- College of Chinese Language and Literature
- College of Physical Education
- Department of Psychology
- Department of Education
- College of State Governance
- College of Economics and Management
- Business College
- School of Pharmaceutical Sciences
- School of Journalism and Communication
- Hanhong College

== History ==
=== Birth ===
Southwest University was originally established in 1906, during the Qing dynasty, as West China University. Much of its development occurred after the Republic of China was established.

=== Formal establishment ===
The modern university was established in July 2005, incorporating the former Southwest China Normal University and Southwest Agricultural University, with the approval of the Chinese Ministry of Education.

== Campus buildings ==
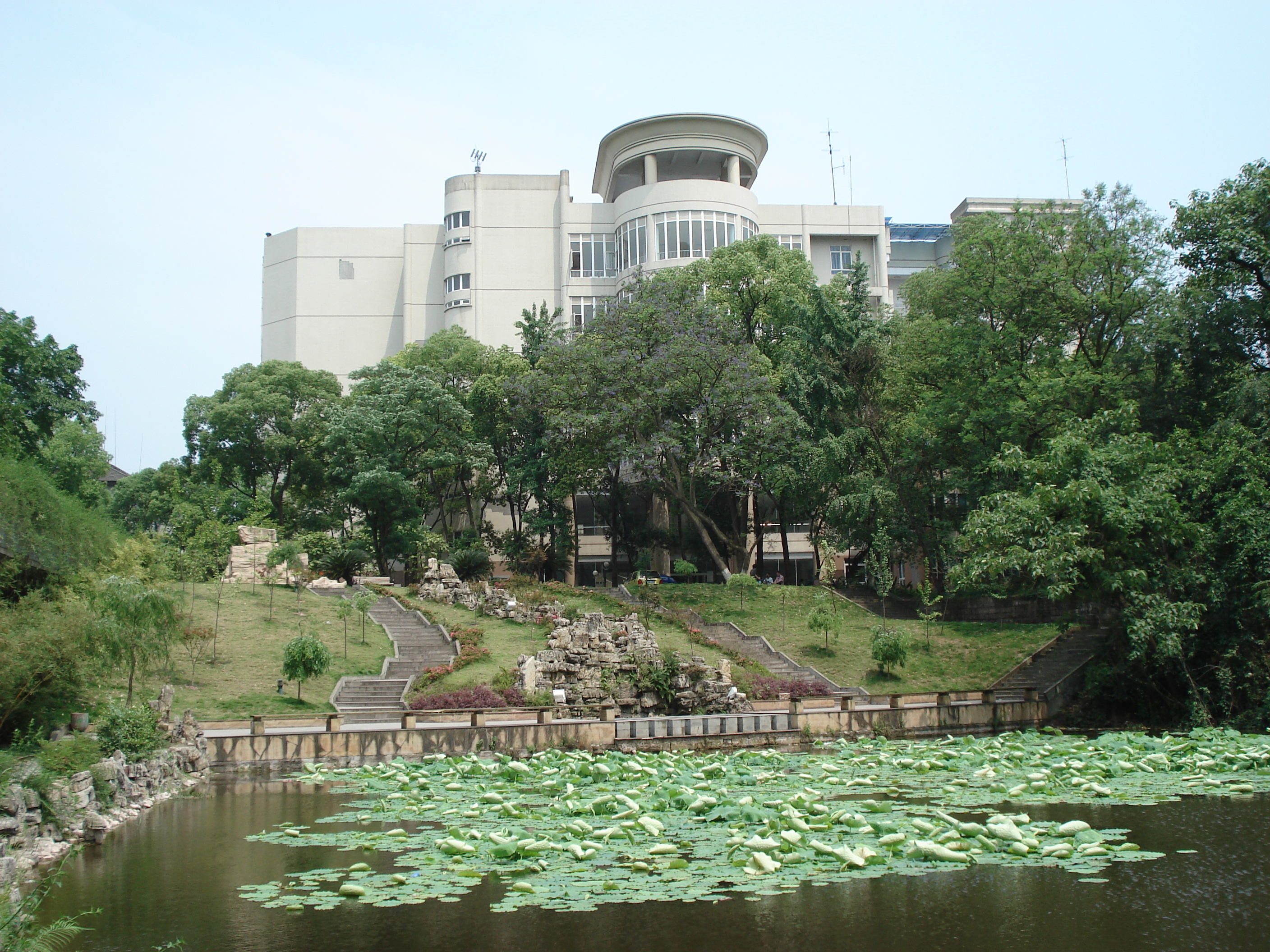
View of the SWU campus.

The following buildings are on the campus:

- Art Gallery
- Basketball Building
- Soccer Court
- The Eighth Teaching Building
- The Thirty-third Teaching Building
- Life Science Building

=== Southwest China Normal University ===
Southwest China Normal University was one of the key comprehensive universities under the administration of the Chinese Ministry of Education. Originally it was created as the Southwest Teachers College. The college was the result of several mergers of the former National Women's Teachers College and the Sichuan Provincial Educational College in 1950. It was then established as Southwest China Normal University in 1985.

=== Southwest Agricultural University ===
Southwest Agricultural University was created in 1950, as the Southwest Agricultural College. The college was the end result of several institutions which were Sichuan Provincial Educational College, the Western China University and Xianghui College.

In 1979, it was authorized by the State Council to be one of the national key universities. It was restructured as Southwest Agricultural College. In 1958, the college was upgraded as Southwest Agricultural University.

In 2001, Sichuan Animal Husbandry and Veterinary College and the Citrus Research Institute of Chinese Academy of Agriculture were absorbed into Southwest Agricultural University. This marked the beginning of a new Southwest Agricultural University which specializes from teaching, pedagogy, psychology, agronomy and agriculture.

Prior to the merger, Southwest China Normal University and Southwest Agricultural University were neighbors with only a wall separating the two universities. Both universities had a long historical relationship, which could be located back to their common origin, West China Union University, founded in 1906.

== Academics ==
=== Innovative Education^{［3］} ===
Hanhong College, whose name comes from the school motto of Southwest University, is a specialized institution that implements the "Southwestern University Undergraduate Top Talent Training Plan". It was established in November 2011 and was incorporated into the School of Innovation and Entrepreneurship in July 2018.

Hanhong College integrates the superior educational resources of the whole school, adheres to the education philosophy of "Solid foundation, strong quality, promotion of individuality, and pursuit of innovation", and implements "one system and three modernizations" (tutorial system, globalization, personalization, and internationalization) to cultivate talents. The training model aims to cultivate top innovative talents with sound personalities, excellent physical fitness and pursuit of excellence.

There are about 400 students in Hanhong College, including the "Wu Mi Class" in liberal arts and the "Yuan Longping Class" in science and engineering, which were established in 2011 as a pilot class for the training program for top-notch talents in basic disciplines, and the experimental class for training outstanding agricultural and forestry talents established in 2014 Class "Shen Nong Class".

Hanhong College provides students with the best teachers and teaching conditions, creating a first-class learning environment and guaranteeing conditions for growth and success. The college has independent classrooms, libraries, and activity rooms. It has established the "Hanhong College Special Scholarship" and provides international exchange visiting programs. It encourages students to enter projects, laboratories, and teams early, and provides students with scientific research training. The college has set up special indicators for recommending and exempting master's degree students. The annual further study rate of graduates remains above 80%, and the number of students studying in first-class domestic and foreign universities is increasing year by year.

== Faculty and Student ==
Southwest University employs 2,650 full-time teachers, and 300 professional researchers, 349 professors (research fellows), and 739 associate professors (associate research fellows, 113 PhD supervisors, and 513 Master's degree tutors.

Southwest University has over 50,000 students.

== Library ==
There are three libraries in school: the central library, the north section library and the south section library. The central library which was built on 2005 is the newest and largest one. The university library holds 3,800,000 volumes of items in total by January 2014.
