= Beibei, Chongqing =

Coordinates: 29.8892°N 106.501°E

Beibei 北碚区
- District
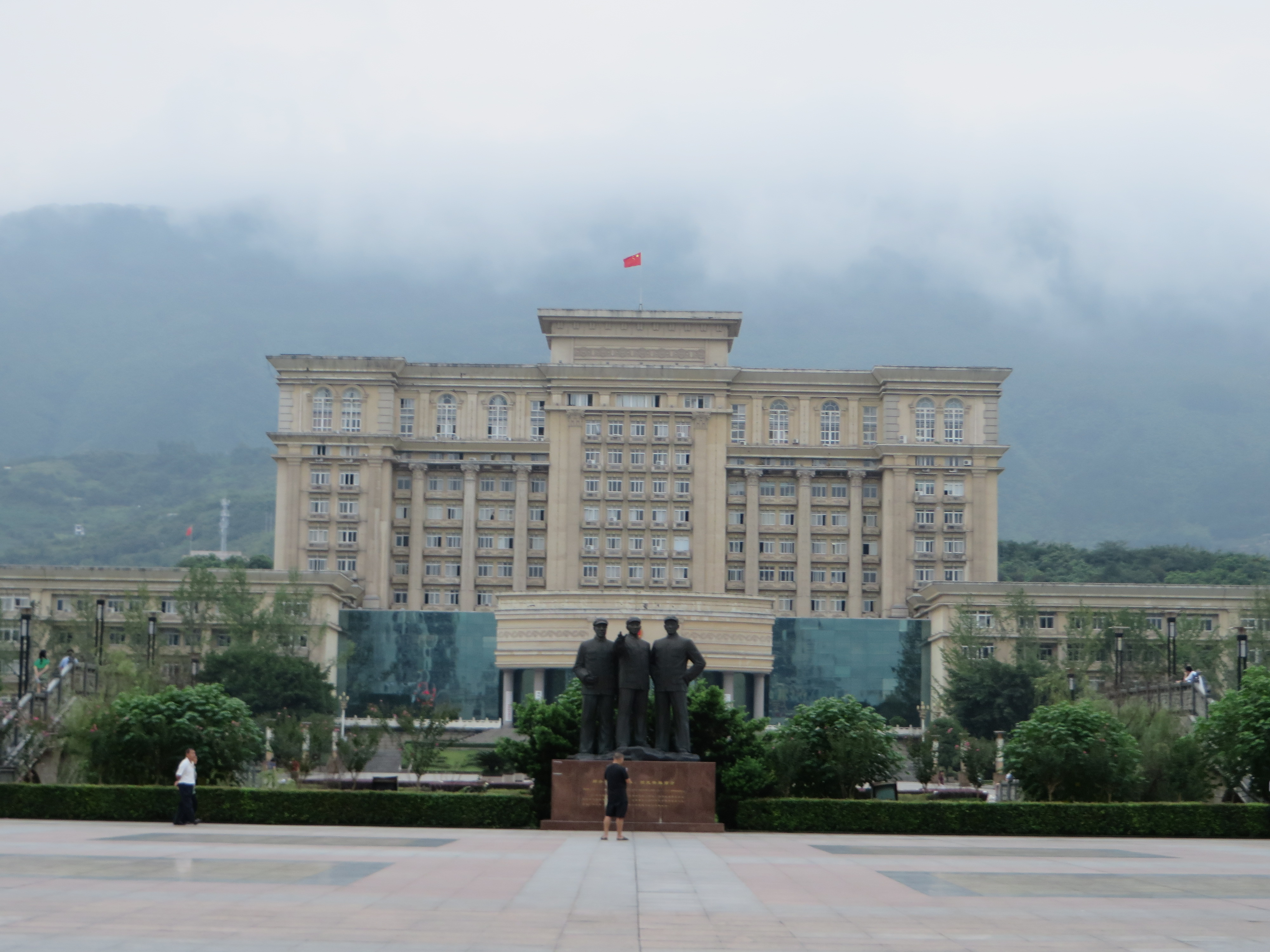
- Government building in Beibei.
- Interactive map of Beibei
- Country: People's Republic of China
- Municipality: Chongqing

Area
  - District: 751.5 km^{2} (290.2 sq mi)

Population (2020 census)
  - District: 834,887
  - Density: 1,111/km^{2} (2,877/sq mi)
  - Urban: 719,079 (86%)
  - Rural: 115,808 (14%)
- Time zone: UTC+8 (China Standard)
- Postal code: 400700
- Area code: 023

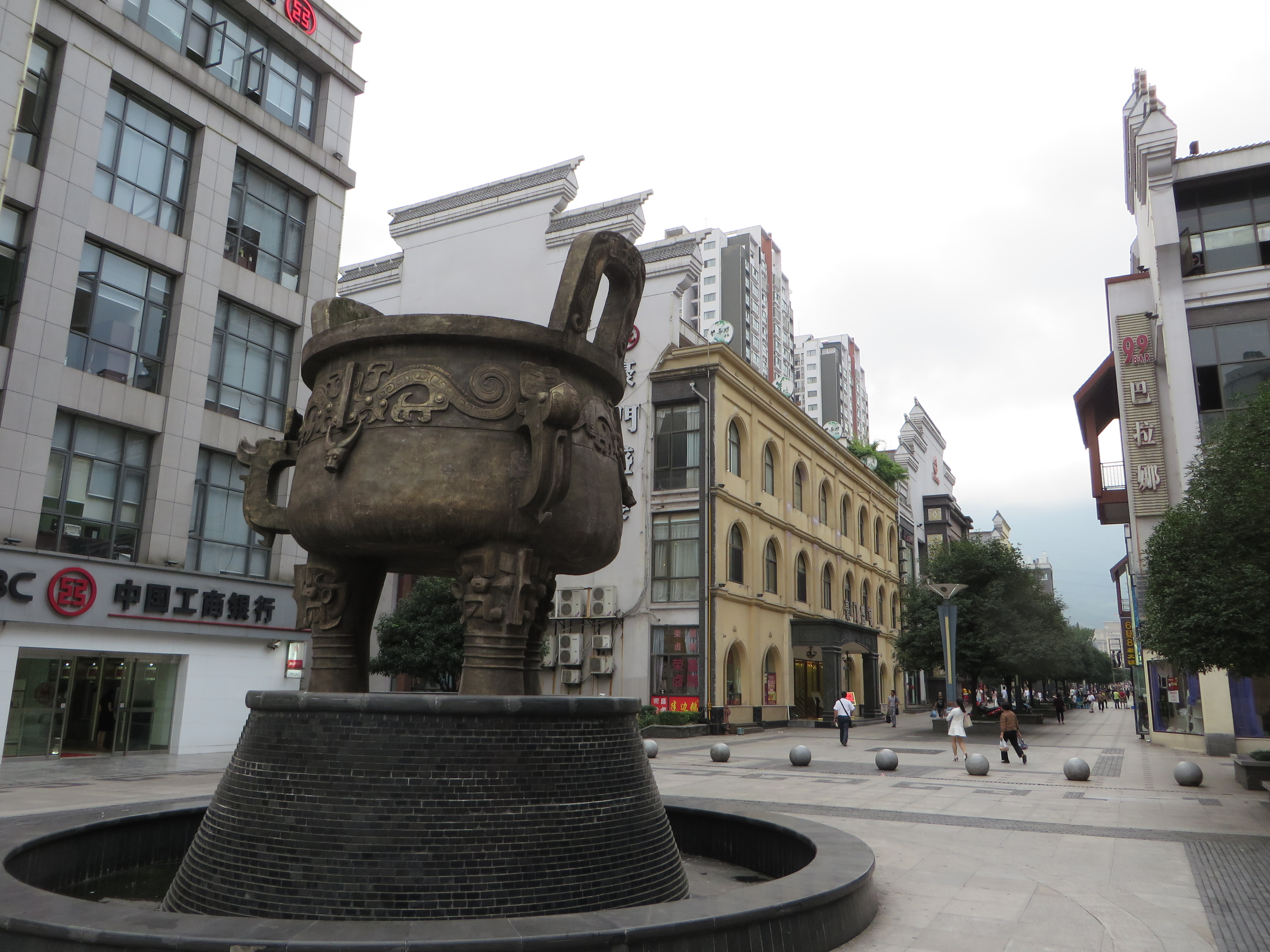
Pedestrianized shopping street in central Beibei.

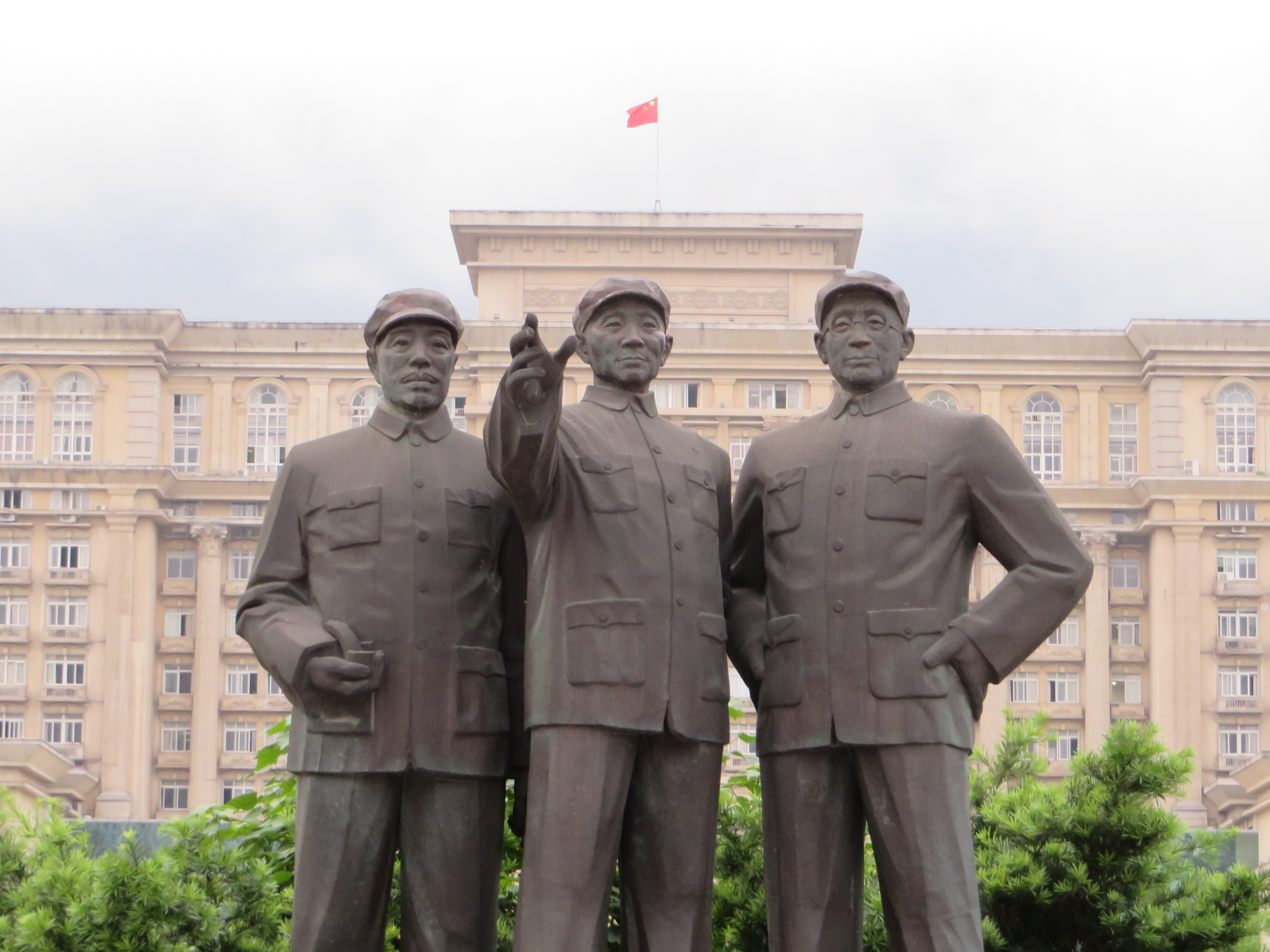
Statues in central Beibei.

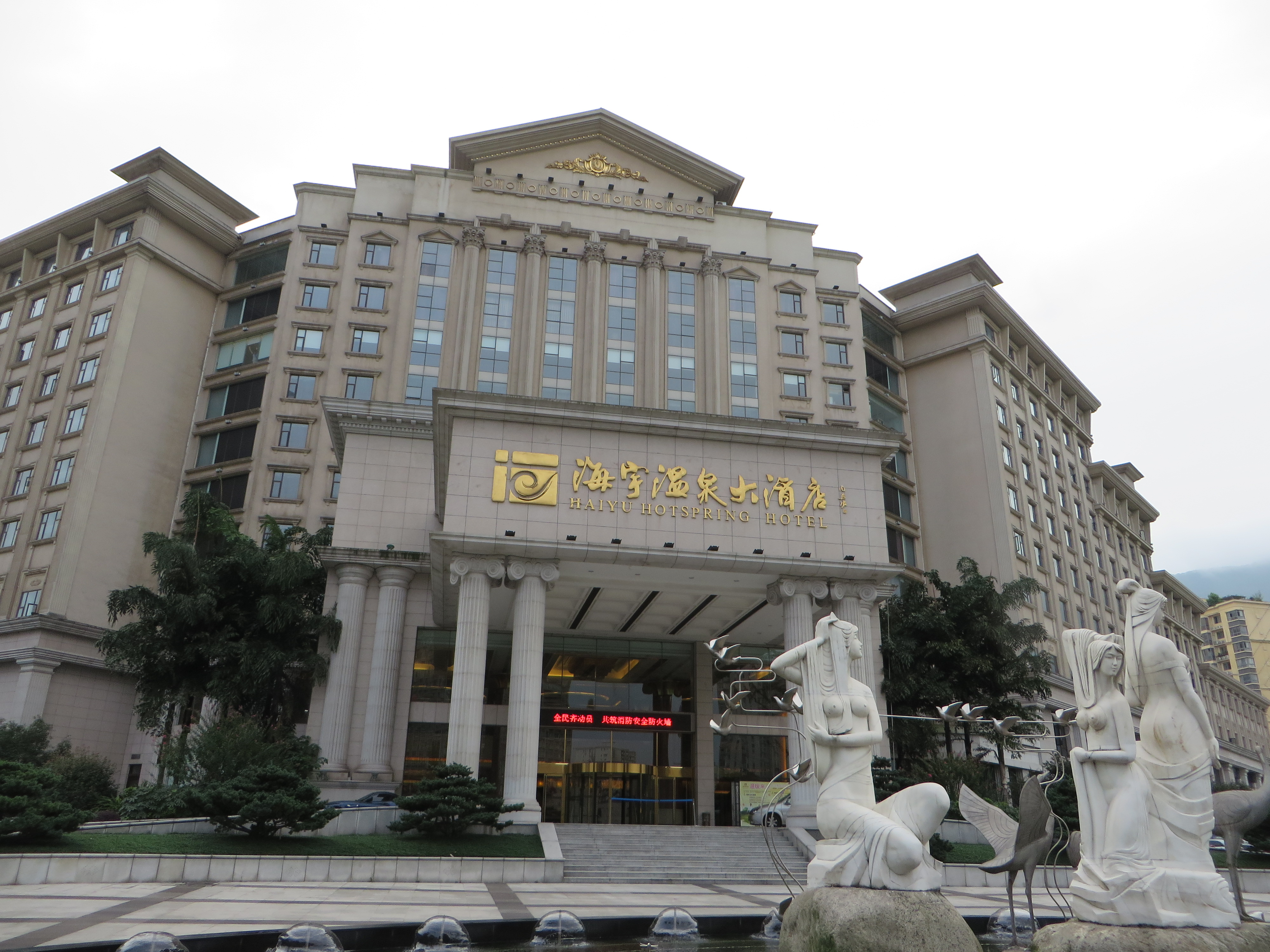
The Haiyu Hotspring Hotel in central Beibei.

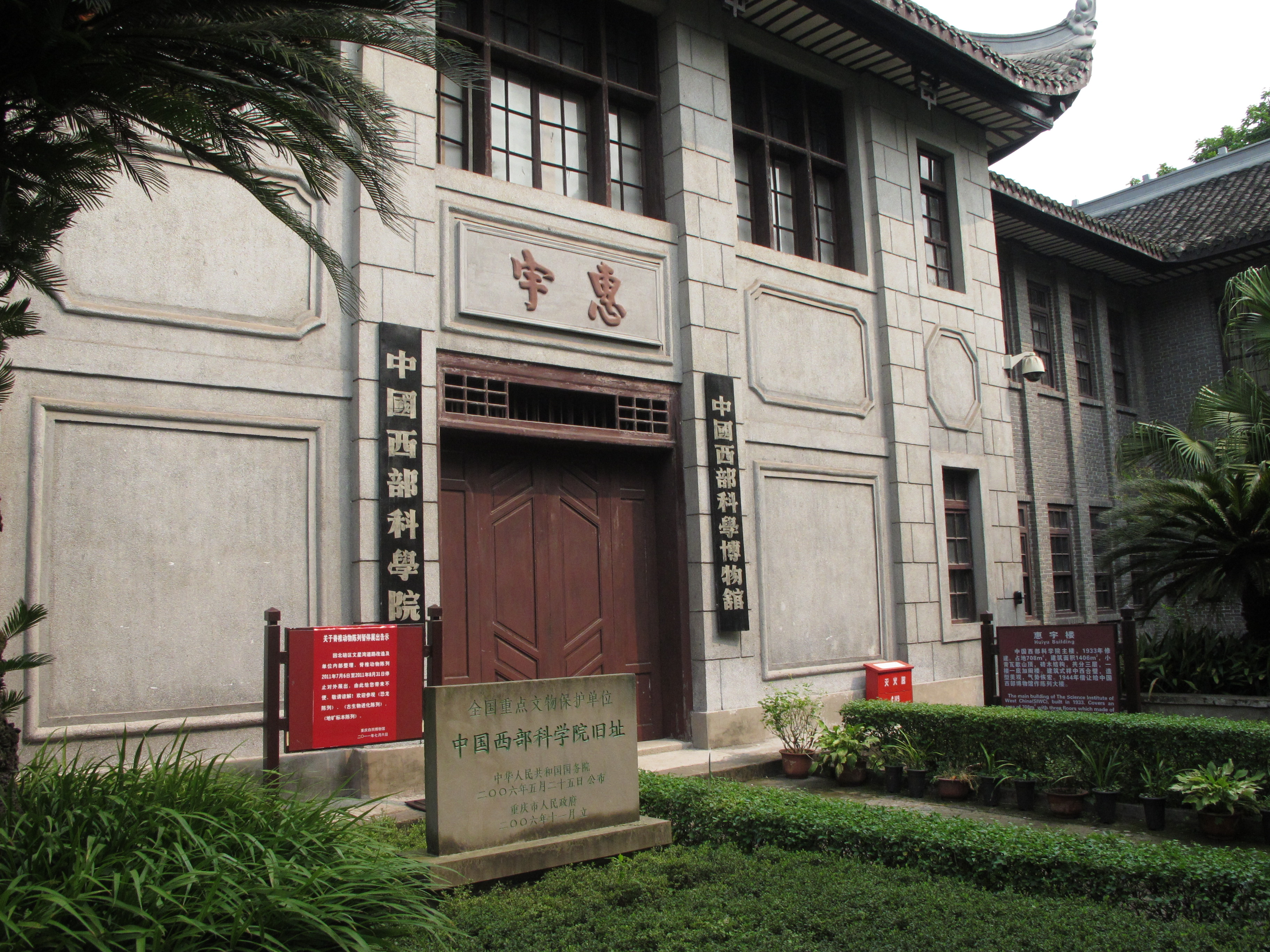
Beibei Museum.

Beibei District (Chinese: 北碚区; pinyin: Běibèi Qū) is a district in the Chongqing municipality, People's Republic of China. A satellite town in the north of central Chongqing, Beibei got its name because of the huge rock that extends to the middle of Jialing River, and is known for its historical culture in the period of the Republic of China. It covers around 755 square kilometers (292 sq mi) and has a population of about 834,887 (2020).

== Location and geography ==
Beibei is located at the outer side of the Chongqing Metropolitan Area. It shares borders with Shapingba (south), Bishan (west), Hechuan (north), and Yubei (east), on the west bank of Jialing River.

== Climate ==
Climate data for Beibei, elevation 241 m (791 ft), (1991–2020 normals, extremes 1981–present)
Month	Jan	Feb	Mar	Apr	May	Jun	Jul	Aug	Sep	Oct	Nov	Dec	Year
Record high °C (°F)	18.8 (65.8)	26.2 (79.2)	35.4 (95.7)	36.5 (97.7)	37.9 (100.2)	37.9 (100.2)	42.3 (108.1)	45.0 (113.0)	43.8 (110.8)	35.3 (95.5)	29.0 (84.2)	20.2 (68.4)	45.0 (113.0)
Mean daily maximum °C (°F)	10.6 (51.1)	13.8 (56.8)	18.8 (65.8)	24.1 (75.4)	27.4 (81.3)	29.8 (85.6)	33.6 (92.5)	33.9 (93.0)	28.5 (83.3)	22.1 (71.8)	17.6 (63.7)	11.8 (53.2)	22.7 (72.8)
Daily mean °C (°F)	7.7 (45.9)	10.1 (50.2)	14.1 (57.4)	19.0 (66.2)	22.4 (72.3)	25.2 (77.4)	28.6 (83.5)	28.5 (83.3)	24.1 (75.4)	18.7 (65.7)	14.1 (57.4)	9.1 (48.4)	18.5 (65.3)
Mean daily minimum °C (°F)	5.7 (42.3)	7.6 (45.7)	11.0 (51.8)	15.4 (59.7)	18.9 (66.0)	22.0 (71.6)	25.0 (77.0)	24.8 (76.6)	21.2 (70.2)	16.5 (61.7)	11.9 (53.4)	7.3 (45.1)	15.6 (60.1)
Record low °C (°F)	−1.8 (28.8)	0.2 (32.4)	0.6 (33.1)	5.8 (42.4)	10.1 (50.2)	14.9 (58.8)	18.9 (66.0)	18.0 (64.4)	14.0 (57.2)	6.6 (43.9)	2.0 (35.6)	−1.9 (28.6)	−1.9 (28.6)
Average precipitation mm (inches)	17.0 (0.67)	20.1 (0.79)	49.0 (1.93)	99.7 (3.93)	152.0 (5.98)	208.9 (8.22)	165.4 (6.51)	135.1 (5.32)	130.7 (5.15)	97.9 (3.85)	48.7 (1.92)	22.6 (0.89)	1,147.1 (45.16)
Average precipitation days (≥ 0.1 mm)	9.7	8.9	11.1	13.7	15.9	16.4	11.7	12.1	13.6	16.6	11.8	10.5	152
Average snowy days	0.4	0.1	0	0	0	0	0	0	0	0	0	0.1	0.6
Average relative humidity (%)	84	80	77	77	78	82	77	74	80	87	87	87	81
Mean monthly sunshine hours	21.8	35.0	76.0	107.6	109.3	96.8	167.3	167.6	101.6	48.8	39.8	22.2	993.8
Percentage possible sunshine	7	11	20	28	26	23	39	41	28	14	13	7	21
Source: China Meteorological Administrationall-time extreme temperatureall-time July high

== Administrative divisions ==
Name	Chinese (S)	Hanyu Pinyin	Population (2010)	Area (km^{2})
Tiansheng Subdistrict	天生街道	Tiānshēng Jiēdào	124,728	7.3
Chaoyang Subdistrict	朝阳街道	Cháoyáng Jiēdào	38,127	2.3
Beiwenquan Subdistrict	北温泉街道	Běiwēnquán Jiēdào	8,4847	24.8
Dongyang Subdistrict	东阳街道	Dōngyáng Jiēdào	40,143	48.79
Longfengqiao Subdistrict	龙凤桥街道	Lóngfèngqiáo Jiēdào	33,981	31.6
Xiema town	歇马镇	Xiēmǎ Zhèn	60,933	
Chengjiang town	澄江镇	Chéngjiāng Zhèn	28,056	72
Tianfu town	天府镇	Tiānfǔ Zhèn	30,980	54
Jingguan town	静观镇	Jìngguān Zhèn	43,674	72.5
Liuyin town	柳荫镇	Liǔyīn Zhèn	17,505	63.83
Sansheng town	三圣镇	Sānshèng Zhèn	19,305	59.22
Jindaoxia town	金刀峡镇	Jīndāoxiá Zhèn	13,752	
Tongjing town	统景镇	Tǒngjǐng Zhèn	30,673	112.3
Dawan town	大湾镇	Dàwān Zhèn	22,484	60.2
Xinglong town	兴隆镇	Xīnglóng Zhèn	20,333	93.5
Cizhu town	茨竹镇	Cízhú Zhèn	22,996	60.25
Dasheng town	大盛镇	Dàshèng Zhèn	21,850	50.5

== Colleges and universities ==
- Southwest University (西南大學) (formed by a 2005 merger of the former Southwest China Normal University and Southwest Agricultural University, founded in 1906 and 1950 respectively)

== High schools ==
- High School Affiliated to Southwest University (西南大学附中)
- Chongqing Chaoyang High School (重庆朝阳中学)
- Chongqing Jianshan High School (重庆兼善中学)
- Chongqing Jiangbei High School (重庆江北中学)

== Transportation ==
- Yuhe Expressway (Chongqing–Hechuan District; 渝合高速)
- Xiangyu Railway (Xiangfan–Chongqing; 襄渝铁路)
- Suiyu Railway (Suining–Chongqing; 遂渝铁路)
- China National Highway 212

=== Metro ===
Beibei is served by one metro line operated by Chongqing Rail Transit:

- Line 6- Caojiawan, Caijia, Xiangjiagang, Longfengxi, Tiansheng, Beibei

== Industry ==
Beibei is one of the three national industry bases for measuring instrument.

== Tourism ==
- The North Spring (北温泉)
- Jinyun Mountain (缙云山)
- Golden Sword Gorge (金刀峡)
- Three Gorges of Jialing River (嘉陵江小三峡)
- Tomb of General Zhang Zizhong (抗日名将张自忠将军墓)
- Former residences of Lao She and Liang Shih-Chiu (民国时期老舍旧居,梁实秋“雅舍”旧址)
- Old campus of Fudan University during WW2 (抗战时期复旦大学旧址)

== Gallery ==
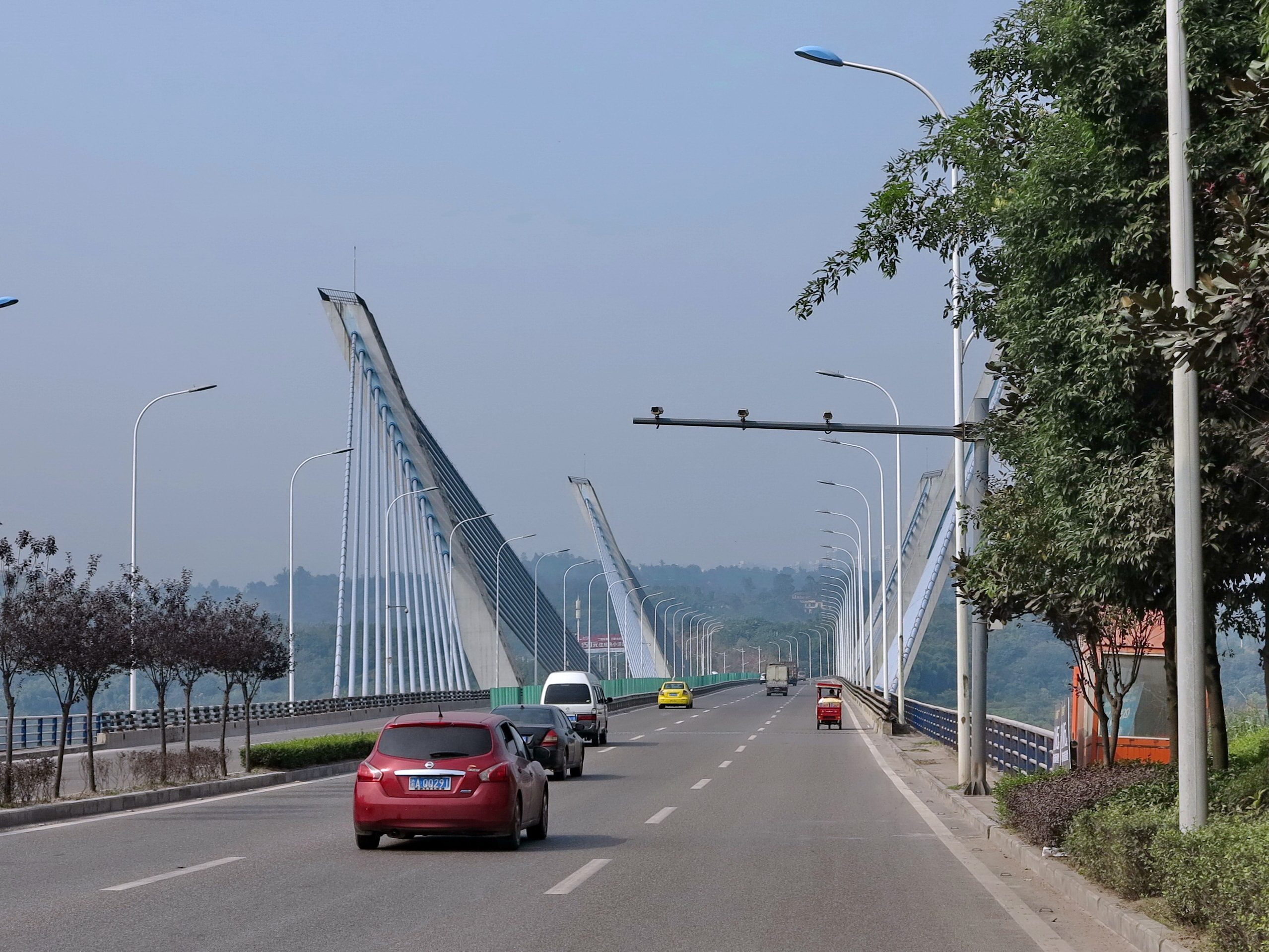
Bridge and cars in Beibei (2014)
