= Hejialiang station =

Chongqing Rail Transit station

Hejialiang 何家梁
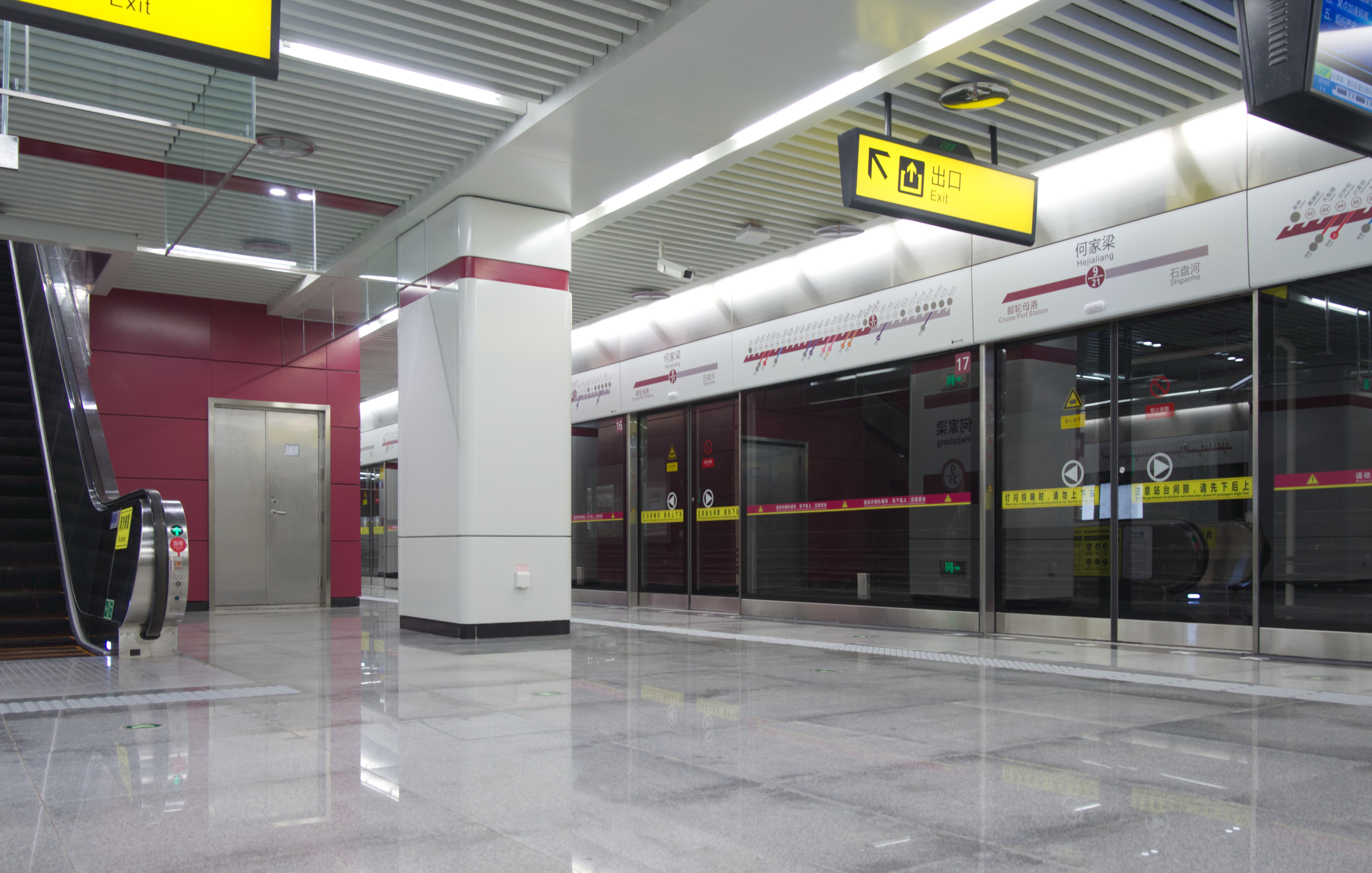
- Platform of Line 9

General information
- Location: Chongqing; China
- Operated by: Chongqing Rail Transit Corp., Ltd
- Line: Line 9
- Platforms: 2 (1 island platform)

Construction
- Structure type: Underground

Other information
- Station code: /

History
- Opened: 25 January 2022

Services
Preceding station	Chongqing Rail Transit	Following station
Baoshuigang towards Gaotanyan	Line 9	Shipanhe towards Huashigou
Location

Hejialiang Station is a station on Line 9 of Chongqing Rail Transit in Chongqing municipality, China, which opened in 2022. It is located in Jiangbei District.
