= Line 4 (Chongqing Rail Transit) =

Metro line of Chongqing Rail Transit

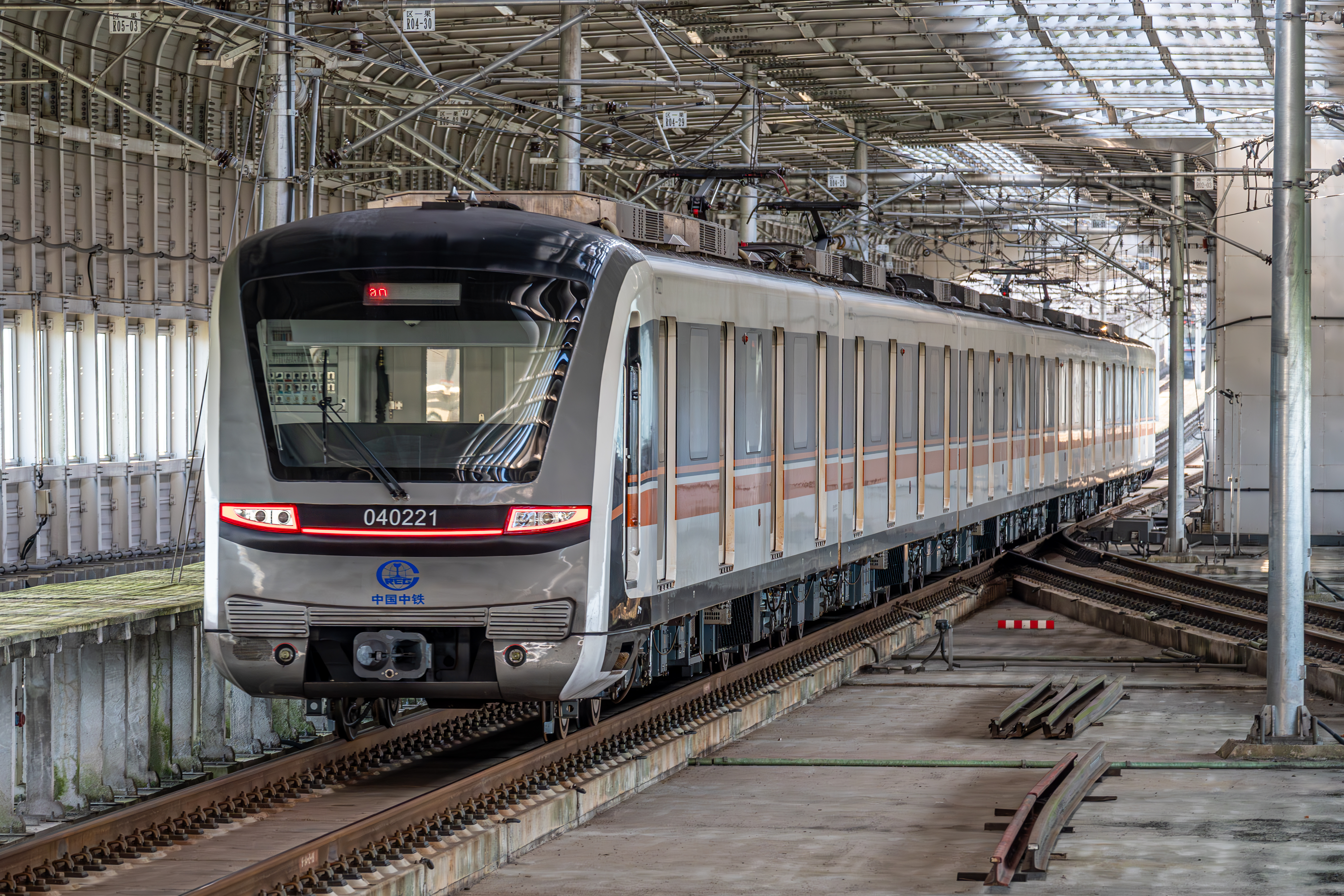
- A train of Line 4 at Luqi station

Overview
- Native name: 重庆轨道交通4号线
- Status: Operational
- Locale: Chongqing, China
- Termini: Shimahelijiao (Future: Shunshuisi Park); Huangling
- Stations: 33

Service
- Type: Rapid transit
- System: Chongqing Rail Transit
- Operator(s): Chongqing Rail Line 4 Construction Operation Co., Ltd.

History
- Opened: 28 December 2018; 7 years ago

Technical
- Line length: 59.5 km (37.0 miles) (58 km (36 miles) in operation)
- Num of tracks: 2
- Track gauge: 1,435 mm (4 ft 8 1/2 in)
- Electrification: 1500 V DC overhead line

Line 4 of Chongqing Rail Transit is a rapid transit line in Chongqing, China.

Since June 2020, some express trains through operate from Line 4 into the Loop line.

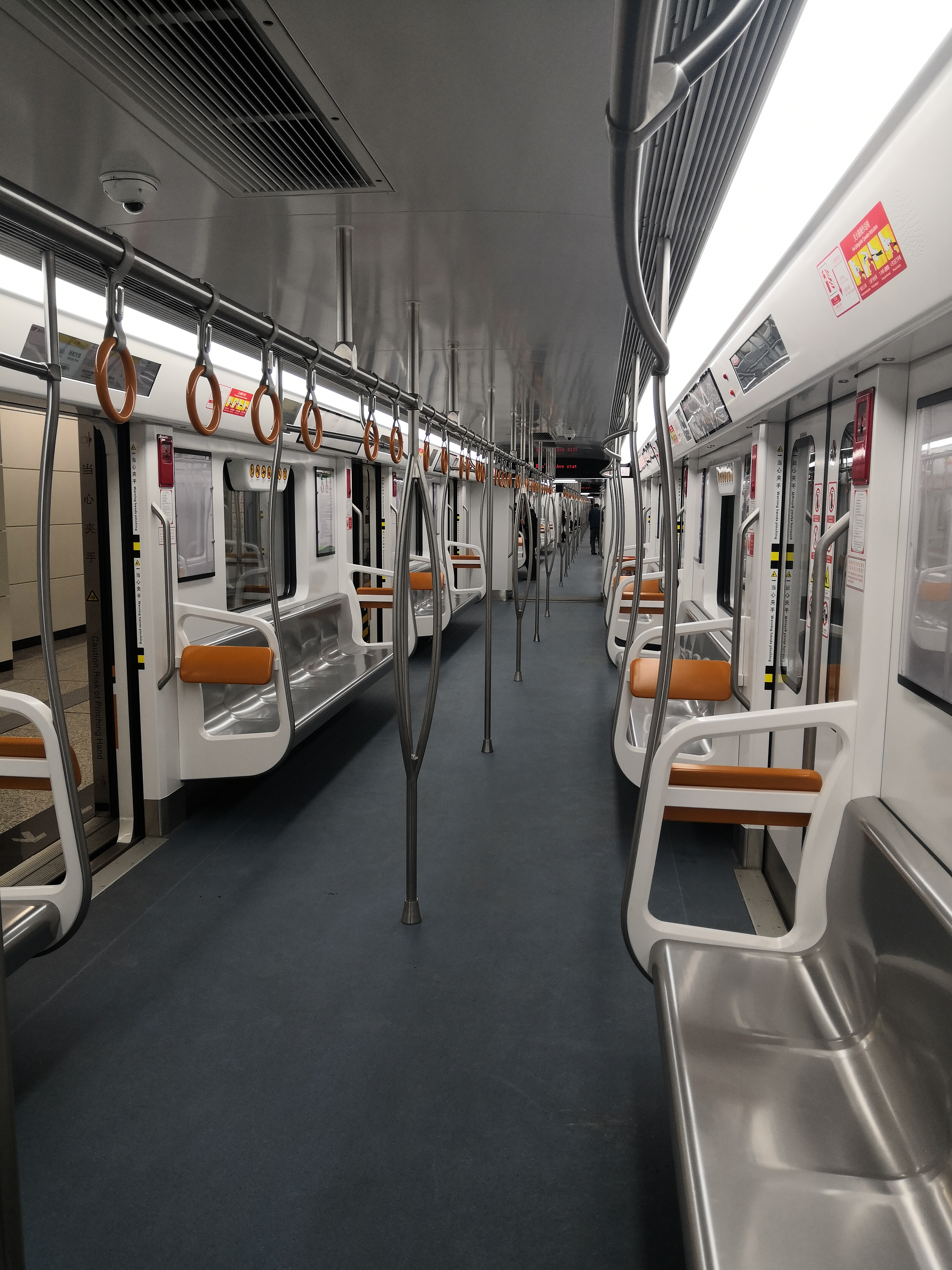
Interior of a Line 4 train

== Opening timeline ==
Segment	Commencement	Length	Station(s)	Name
Chongqing North Station North Square – Tangjiatuo	28 December 2018	15.7 km (9.8 mi)	7	Phase 1
Min'an Ave. – Chongqing North Station North Square	11 January 2019	15.7 km (9.8 mi)	1	Phase 1
Tangjiatuo – Huangling	18 June 2022	32.8 km (20.4 mi)	15	Phase 2
Gangcheng	7 October 2023	infill station	1	
Jiazhoulu – Shimahelijiao	10 February 2026	11 km (6.8 mi)	8	Western extension
Shimahelijiao – Shunshuisi Park	Late 2026 or Early 2027 (under construction)	11 km (6.8 mi)	1	Western extension

== Stations ==
Route of Line 4

=== Phases 1 and 2 ===
Phase 1 (Min'an Ave. – Tangjiatuo) is 15.754 km (9.789 mi) in length (underground section is 11.075 km (6.882 mi), elevated section is 4.679 km (2.907 mi)). In June 2018, debugging of the first segment of Phase I commenced. Phase 1 of Line 4 began operating on December 28, 2018.

Phase 2 (Tangjiatuo – Huangling) is 32.8 km (20.4 mi) in length (21.25 km (13.20 mi) underground and 11.55 km (7.18 mi) elevated) with 15 stations (10 underground stations and 5 elevated stations). In 2022, debugging of this segment commenced. The segment opened on June 18, 2022.

=== Western extension ===
Western extension (Shunshuisi Park – Jiazhoulu) is 11 km (6.8 mi) in length, all are underground with 9 stations (Shunshuisi Park station is not opened). Construction started on March 2, 2021 and begin operating on 10 February 2026 at 2:00 pm (Shunshuisi Park station is not opened).

=== Stations (West to East) ===
Service routes		Station No.	Station name		Connections	Distance km		Location
E	L	Station No.	English	Chinese	Connections	Distance km		Location
		/	Shunshuisi Park	顺水寺公园				Liangjiang
	●	/	Shimahelijiao	石马河立交				Liangjiang
	●	/	Yudaishan	玉带山	Loop line			Liangjiang
	●	/	Panxi	盘溪				Liangjiang
	●	/	Dashiba	大石坝	Line 5			Liangjiang
	●	/	Daqingcun	大庆村				Liangjiang
	●	/	Huahuiyuan	花卉园	Line 6			Liangjiang
	●	/	Longxi	龙溪				Liangjiang
	●	/	Jiazhoulu	嘉州路	Line 3			Liangjiang
↑		Express trains through service to/from Tiaodeng via Loop line and Line 5.						Liangjiang
●	●	/	Min'an Ave.	民安大道	Loop line	-	0.00	Liangjiang
●	●	/	Chongqing North Station North Square (Note: The former translation is North Square of Chongqingbei Railway Station, which has been replaced since the opening of Line 10's station)	重庆北站北广场	Line 10	2.27	2.27	Liangjiang
●	●	/	Toutang	头塘	Line 9	2.36	4.63	Liangjiang
｜	●	/	Baoshuigang	保税港	Line 9	1.36	5.99	Liangjiang
｜	●	/	Cuntan	寸滩		2.59	8.58	Liangjiang
｜	●	/	Heishizi	黑石子		1.53	10.11	Liangjiang
｜	●	/	Gangcheng	港城		1.29	11.4	Liangjiang
｜	●	/	Taipingchong	太平冲		2.13	13.53	Liangjiang
●	●	/	Tangjiatuo	唐家沱		1.82	15.35	Liangjiang
	●	/	Tieshanping	铁山坪		1.38	16.73	Liangjiang
	●	/	Luqi	鹿栖		5.30	22.03	Liangjiang
	●	/	Guoyuan Logistics Hub	果园物流枢纽		2.60	24.63	Liangjiang
	●	/	Yuzui	鱼嘴		2.73	27.36	Liangjiang
	●	/	Yanping	雁坪		1.45	28.81	Liangjiang
	●	/	Shiheqing	石河清		2.69	31.50	Liangjiang
	●	/	Fusheng	复盛	Fusheng 15	2.16	33.66	Liangjiang
	●	/	Sanbanxi	三板溪		1.32	34.98	Liangjiang
	●	/	Longyi Ave.	龙驿大道		2.52	37.50	Liangjiang
	●	/	Longxing	龙兴		1.56	39.06	Liangjiang
	●	/	Gaoshita	高石塔		1.13	40.19	Liangjiang
	●	/	Pufu	普福		1.96	42.15	Liangjiang
	●	/	Tongzilin	桐梓林		1.91	44.06	Liangjiang
	●	/	Shichuan	石船		2.64	46.70	Liangjiang
	●	/	Huangling	黄岭		1.57	48.27	Liangjiang

== Notable news ==
The line is nicknamed the "Basket Line" by some locals, as rural, mostly elderly, residents use the line to bring baskets of vegetables into the city to sell at marketplaces. Some people suggested to ban vegetable baskets on the line, which was rejected by the operator.
