= Tangjiatuo station =

Chongqing Rail Transit station

Tangjiatuo 唐家沱
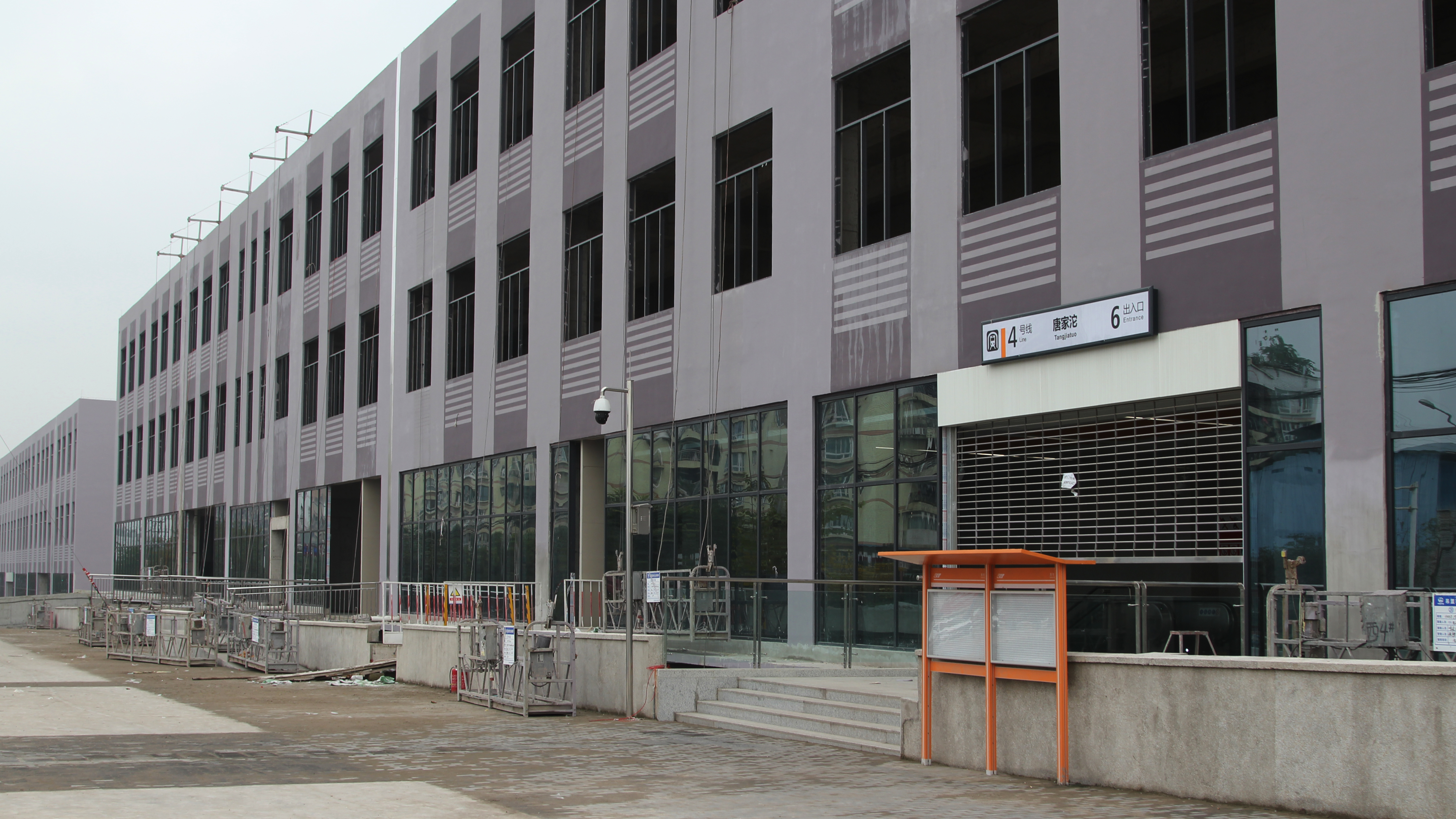

General information
- Location: Chongqing; China
- Coordinates: 29.6084651°N 106.6553344°E
- Operated by: Chongqing Rail Transit Corp., Ltd
- Line: Line 4

Construction
- Structure type: At-grade and underground

Other information
- Station code: /

History
- Opened: 28 December 2018; 7 years ago

Services
Preceding station	Chongqing Rail Transit	Following station
Taipingchong towards Shimahelijiao	Line 4	Tieshanping towards Huangling
Toutang towards Tiaodeng	Line 4 Express	Terminus
Location

Tangjiatuo Station is a station on Line 4 of Chongqing Rail Transit in Chongqing municipality, China, which opened in 2018. It is located in Liangjiang New Area.
