= Heishizi station =

Chongqing Rail Transit station

Heishizi 黑石子
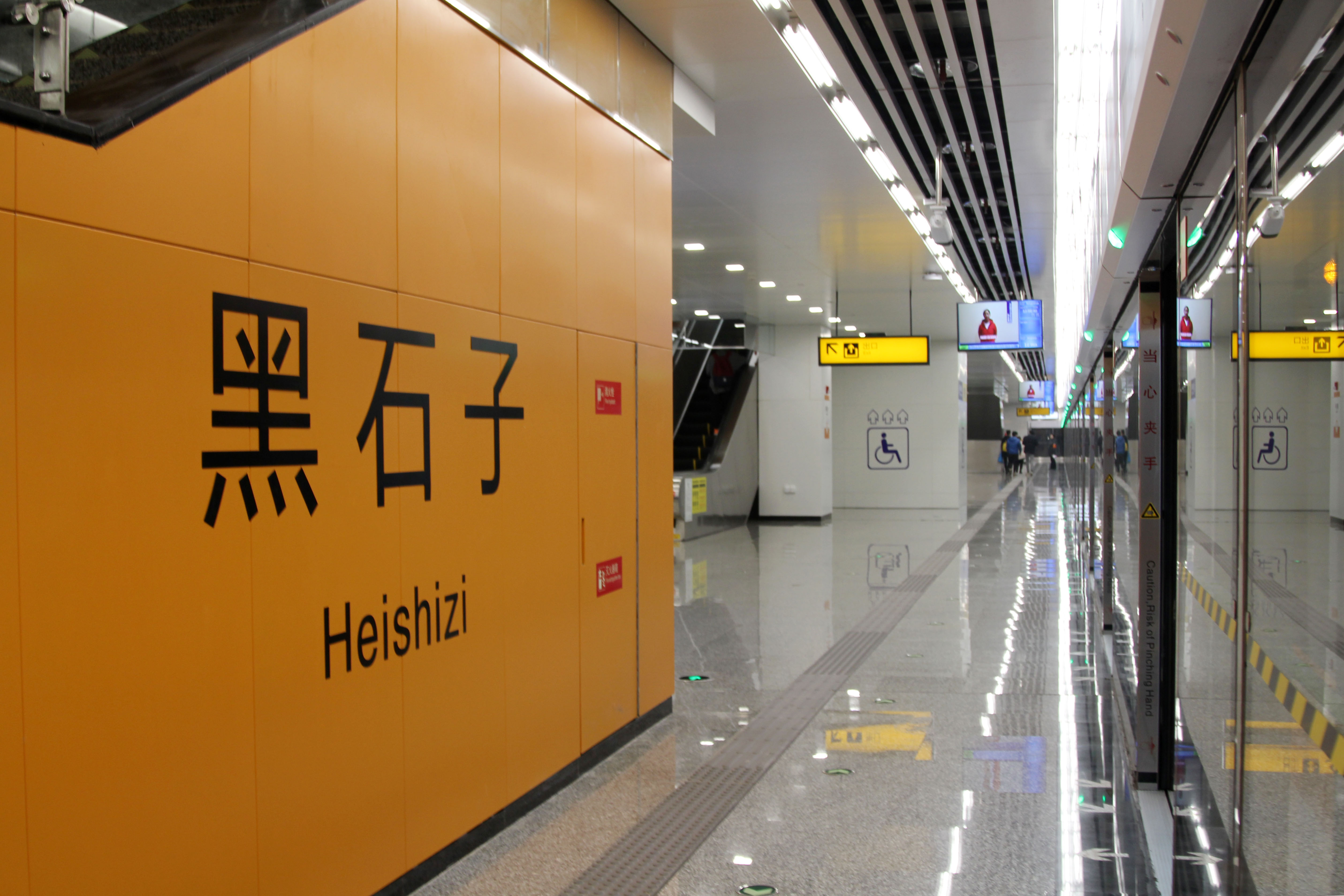

General information
- Location: Chongqing; China
- Coordinates: 29.6275°N 106.6170°E
- Operated by: Chongqing Rail Transit Corp., Ltd
- Line: Line 4
- Platforms: 4 (2 island platforms)

Construction
- Structure type: Underground

Other information
- Station code: /

History
- Opened: 28 December 2018; 7 years ago

Services
Preceding station	Chongqing Rail Transit	Following station
Cuntan towards Shimahelijiao	Line 4	Taipingchong towards Huangling
Location

Heishizi Station is a station on Line 4 of Chongqing Rail Transit in Chongqing municipality, China. It is located in Liangjiang New Area and opened in 2018.

== Station structure ==
There are 2 island platforms at this station, but only 2 outer platforms are used for Local trains to stop, with Express trains passing through the middle tracks.

1F; Concourse	Exits, Customer service, Vending machines
B1; Platforms	Line 4 to Shimahelijiao (Cuntan)
B1; Platforms	Island platform
B1; Platforms	Bypass track for Line 4 express trains
B1; Platforms	Bypass track for Line 4 express trains
B1; Platforms	Island platform
B1; Platforms	Line 4 to Huangling (Taipingchong)
