= Baoshuigang station =

Chongqing Rail Transit station

Baoshuigang 保税港
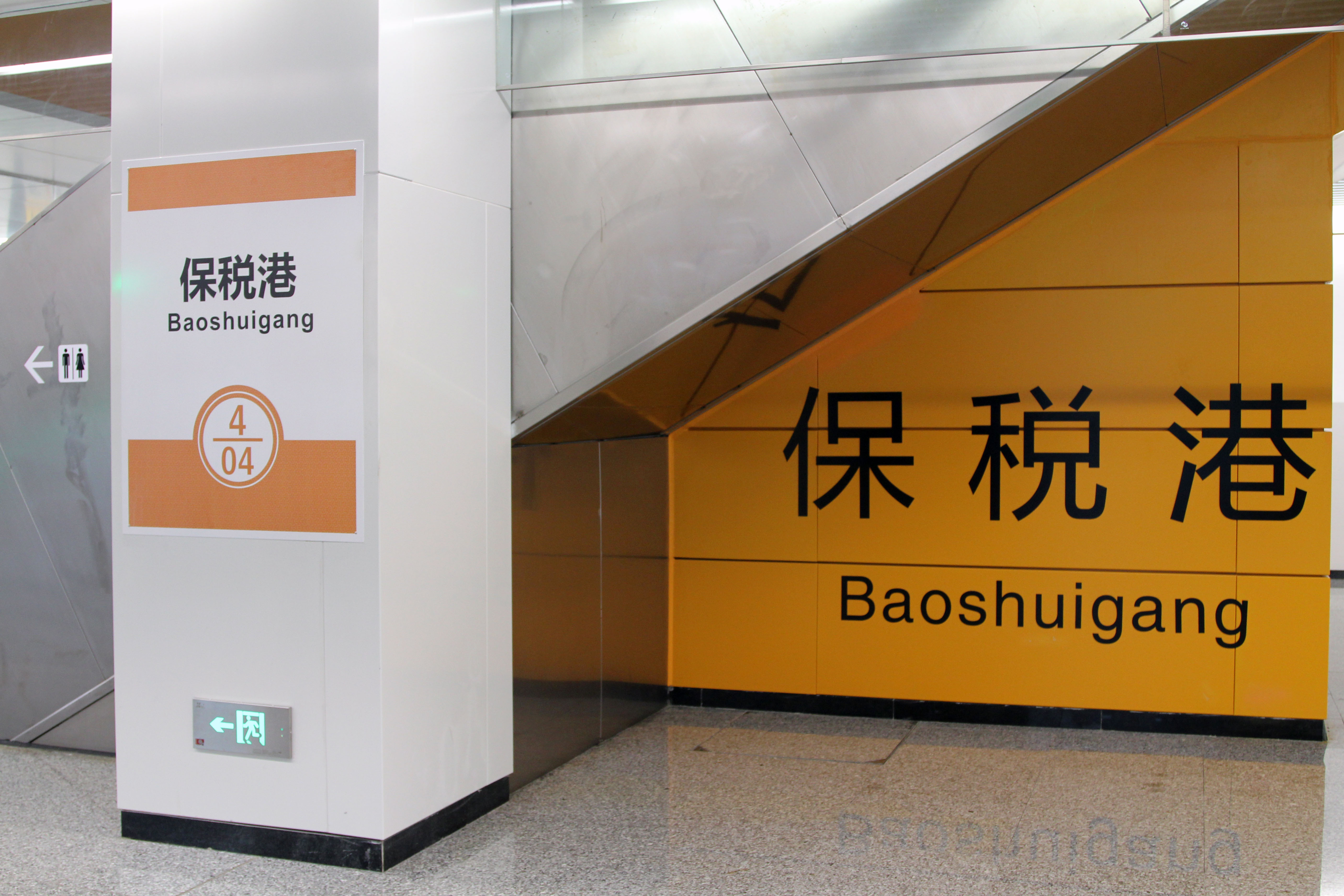

General information
- Location: Liangjiang New Area, Chongqing; China
- Coordinates: 29.61918°N 106.57876°E
- Operated by: Chongqing Rail Transit Corp., Ltd
- Lines: Line 4 Line 9
- Platforms: 4 (2 island platforms)

Construction
- Structure type: Underground

Other information
- Station code: / /

History
- Opened: 28 December 2018; 7 years ago (Line 4); 25 January 2022; 4 years ago (Line 9)

Services
Preceding station	Chongqing Rail Transit	Following station
Toutang towards Shimahelijiao	Line 4	Cuntan towards Huangling
Toutang towards Gaotanyan	Line 9	Hejialiang towards Huashigou
Location

Baoshuigang station (Chinese: 保税港站; pinyin: Bǎoshuìgǎng zhàn; lit. 'Bonded Port station'), is an interchange station between Line 4 and Line 9 of Chongqing Rail Transit in Chongqing municipality, China. It is located in Liangjiang New Area and opened in 2018. A cross-platform interchange is provided between Line 4 and Line 9.

== Station structure ==
There are 2 island platforms at this station. The two outer tracks are used for Line 4 trains, while the other two inner tracks are used for Line 9 trains. A same direction cross-platform interchange is provided between the two metro lines.

B1; Concourse	Exits, Customer service, Vending machines
B2; Platforms	Line 4 to Shimahelijiao (Toutang)
B2; Platforms	Island platform
B2; Platforms	Line 9 to Gaotanyan (Toutang)
B2; Platforms	Line 9 to Huashigou (Hejialiang)
B2; Platforms	Island platform
B2; Platforms	Line 4 to Huangling (Cuntan)
