= Toutang station =

Metro station in Chongqing, China

Toutang 头塘
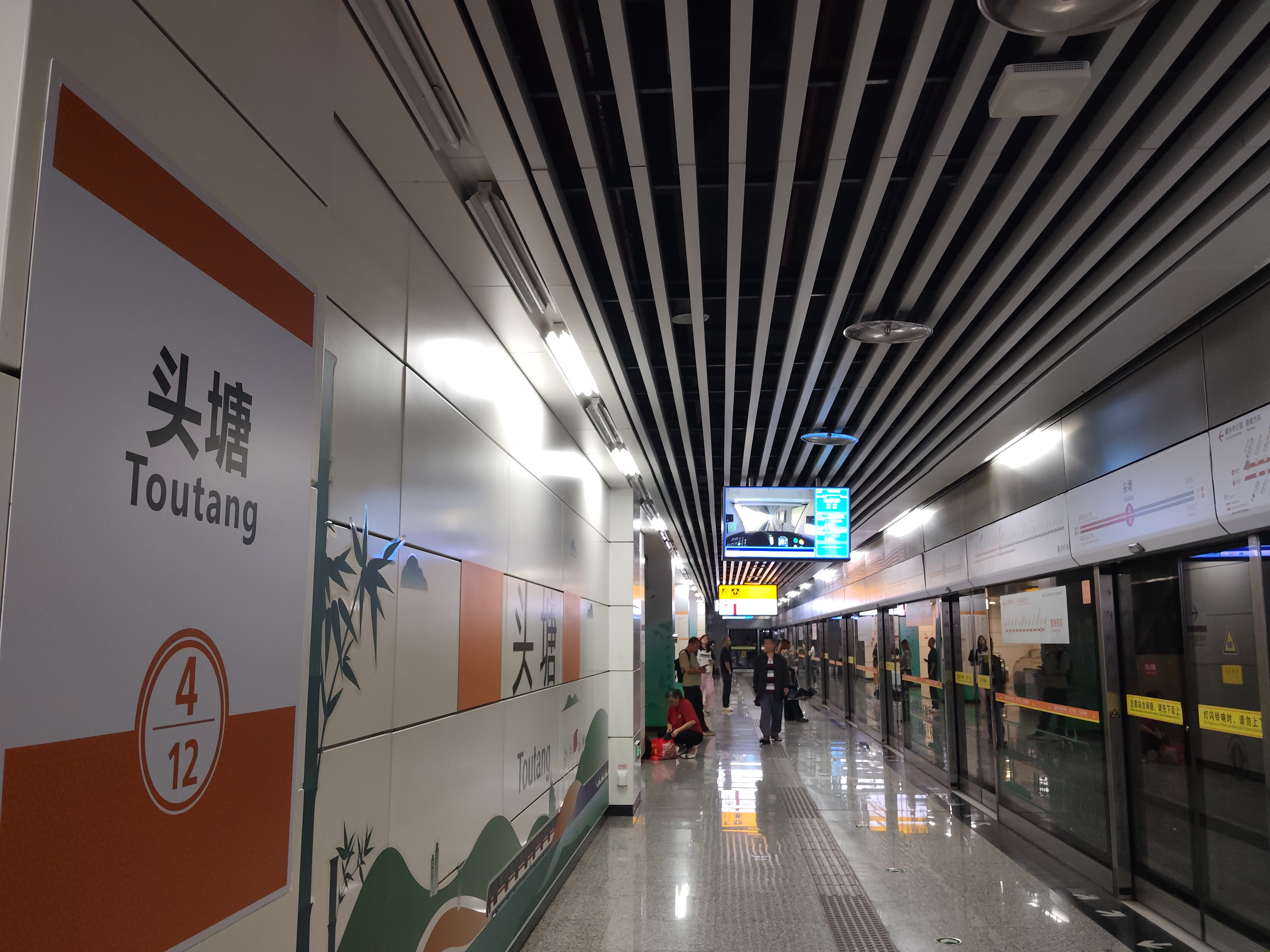
- Platform of Line 4

Chinese name
- Simplified Chinese: 头塘站
- Traditional Chinese: 頭塘站
Transcriptions
Standard Mandarin
- Hanyu Pinyin: Tóutáng Zhàn

General information
- Location: Hai'er Road (海尔路); Liangjiang New Area, Chongqing; China
- Coordinates: 29°36′40″N 106°34′14″E
- System: Chongqing Rail Transit
- Operator: Chongqing Rail Transit Operation Co., Ltd.
- Lines: Line 4 Line 9
- Platforms: 4 (2 island platforms)
- Tracks: 4

Construction
- Structure type: Underground
- Platform levels: 2
- Accessible: Yes

Other information
- Station code: / /

History
- Opened: 28 December 2018

Services
Preceding station	Chongqing Rail Transit	Following station
Chongqing N. Station N. Square towards Shimahelijiao	Line 4	Baoshuigang towards Huangling
Chongqing N. Station N. Square towards Tiaodeng	Line 4 Express	Tangjiatuo Terminus
Gailanxi towards Gaotanyan	Line 9	Baoshuigang towards Huashigou
Location

Toutang Station is an interchange station between Line 4 and Line 9 of Chongqing Rail Transit in Chongqing municipality, China. It is located in Liangjiang New Area, adjacent to the People's Government of Chongqing, Jiangbei District. It opened in 2018.

== Station structure ==
B1	Concourse	Customer service, Vending machines
B2		Line 4 to Shimahelijiao (Chongqing North Station North Square)
B2	Island platform
B2		Line 4 to Huangling (Baoshuigang)
B3		Line 9 to Gaotanyan (Gailanxi)
B3	Island platform
B3		Line 9 to Huashigou (Baoshuigang)
