= Taipingchong station =

Chongqing Rail Transit station

Taipingchong 太平冲
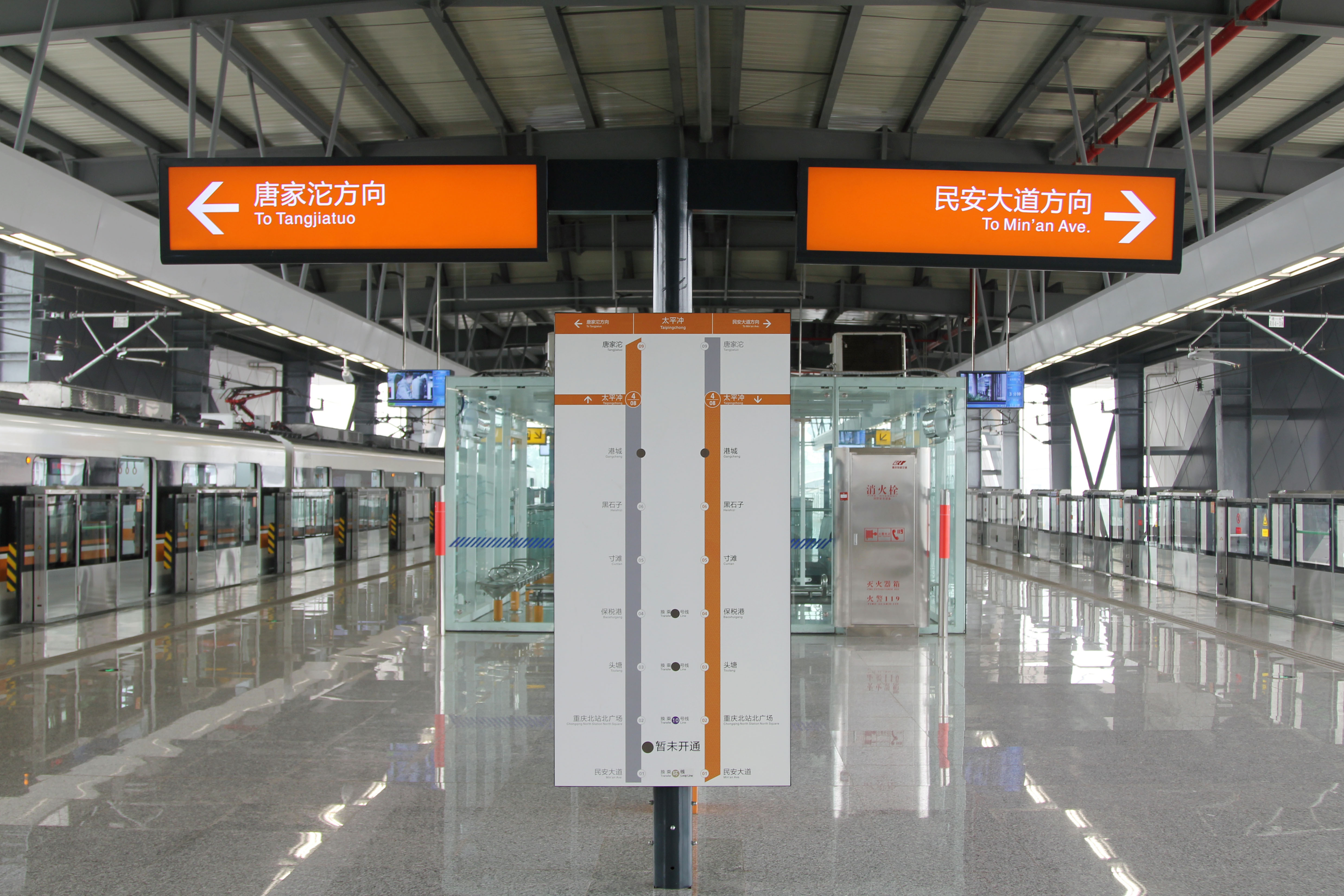

General information
- Location: Chongqing; China
- Coordinates: 29.6086°N 106.6378°E
- Operated by: Chongqing Rail Transit Corp., Ltd
- Line: Line 4
- Platforms: 2 (1 island platform)

Construction
- Structure type: Elevated

Other information
- Station code: /

History
- Opened: 28 December 2018; 7 years ago

Services
Preceding station	Chongqing Rail Transit	Following station
Heishizi towards Shimahelijiao	Line 4	Tangjiatuo towards Huangling
Location

Taipingchong Station is a station on Line 4 of Chongqing Rail Transit in Chongqing municipality, China. It is located in Liangjiang New Area and opened in 2018.

== Station structure ==
There are 2 island platforms at this station, located separately on two floors. The one of Line 4 is on the upper floor, while the other one on the lower floor is reserved for Phase III of Line 18, which is currently under planning.

4F; Platforms	Line 4 to Shimahelijiao (Heishizi)
4F; Platforms	Island platform
4F; Platforms	Line 4 to Huangling (Tangjiatuo)
3F; Platforms	Reserved for Line 18
3F; Platforms	Island platform
3F; Platforms	Reserved for Line 18
2F; Concourse	Exits, Customer service, Vending machines, Toilets
1F	Exits
