= Gailanxi station =

Chongqing Rail Transit station

Gailanxi 溉澜溪
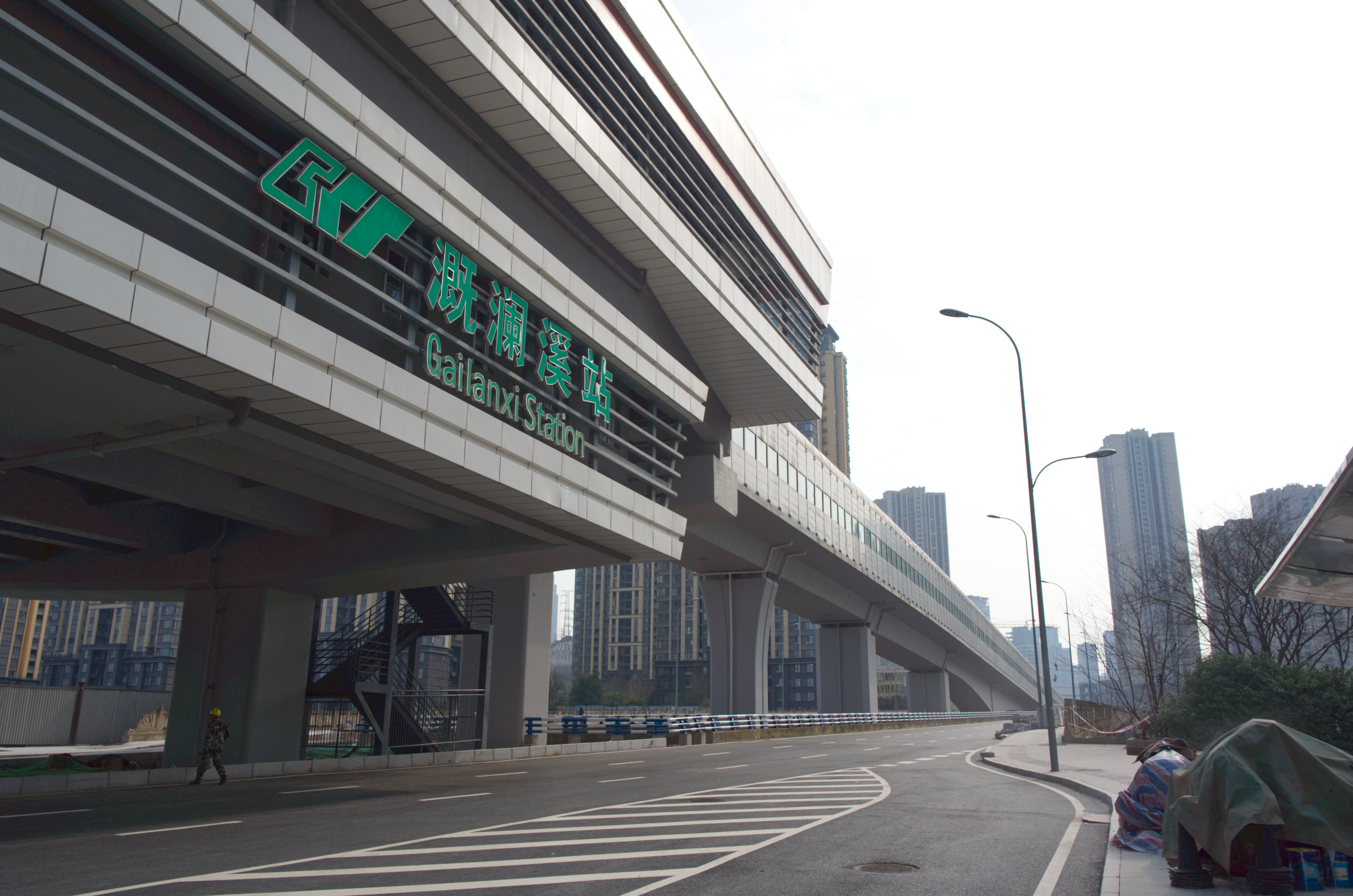
- Station exterior

General information
- Location: Chongqing; China
- Operated by: Chongqing Rail Transit Corp., Ltd
- Line: Line 9
- Platforms: 2 side platforms

Construction
- Structure type: Elevated

Other information
- Station code: /

History
- Opened: 25 January 2022

Services
Preceding station	Chongqing Rail Transit	Following station
Wulidian towards Gaotanyan	Line 9	Toutang towards Huashigou
Location

Gailanxi station (Chinese: 溉澜溪站; pinyin: Gàilǎnxī zhàn) is a station on Line 9 of Chongqing Rail Transit in Chongqing municipality, China, which opened in 2022. It is located in Jiangbei District.
