= Cuntan station =

Chongqing Rail Transit station

Cuntan 寸滩
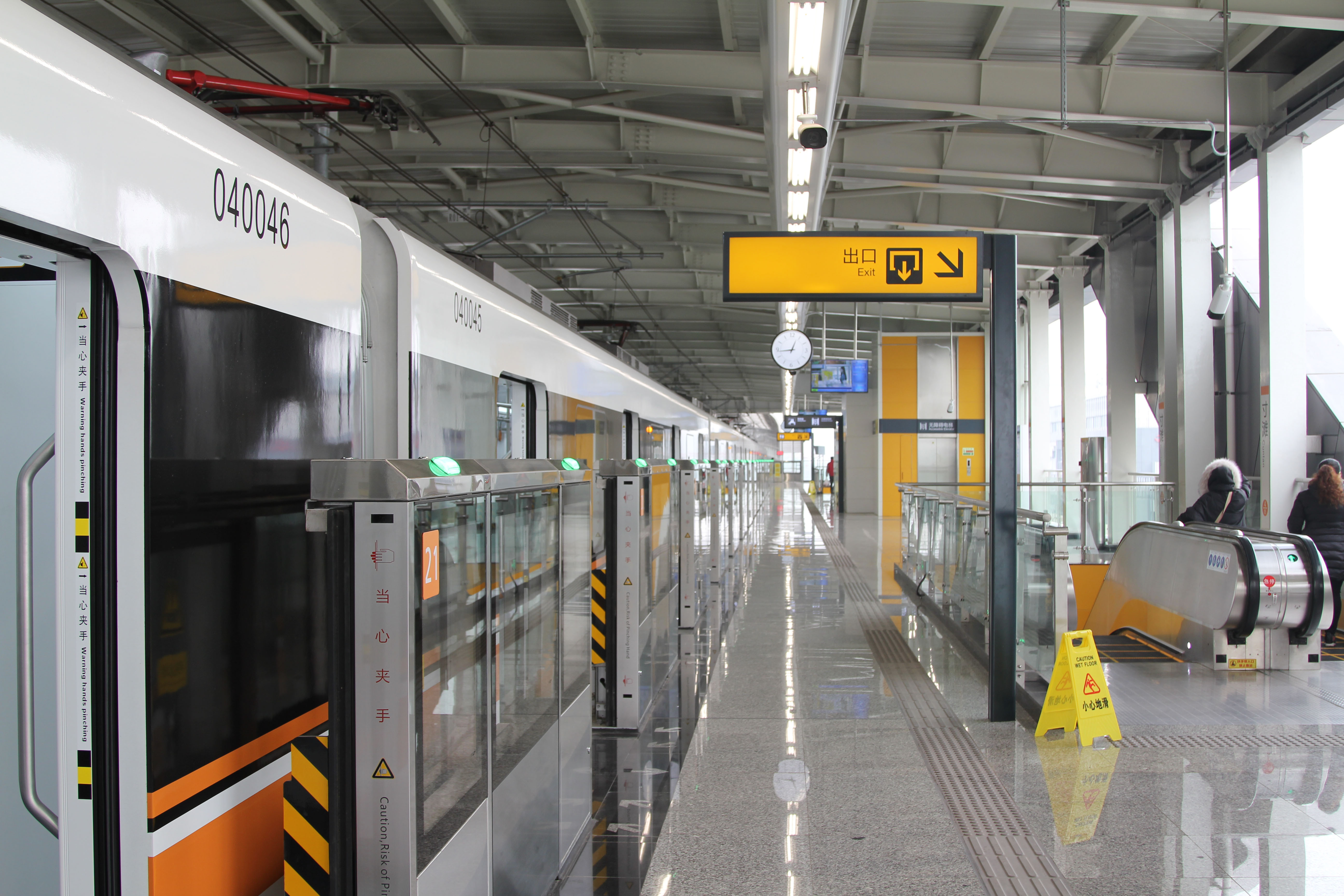

General information
- Location: Chongqing; China
- Coordinates: 29.6247°N 106.6026°E
- Operated by: Chongqing Rail Transit Corp., Ltd
- Line: Line 4

Construction
- Structure type: Elevated

Other information
- Station code: /

History
- Opened: 28 December 2018; 7 years ago

Services
Preceding station	Chongqing Rail Transit	Following station
Baoshuigang towards Shimahelijiao	Line 4	Heishizi towards Huangling
Location

Cuntan Station is a station on Line 4 of Chongqing Rail Transit in Chongqing municipality, China. It is located in Liangjiang New Area and opened in 2018.
