= Sanjiang, Daozhen County =

Sanjiang 三江镇
- Town
- Location in Guizhou
- Coordinates: 28°40′40″N 107°28′46″E
- Country: People's Republic of China
- Province: Guizhou
- Prefecture-level city: Zunyi
- Autonomous county: Daozhen Gelao and Miao Autonomous County
- Village-level divisions: 4 villages

Area
  - Total: 74.95 km^{2} (28.94 sq mi)
- Elevation: 530 m (1,740 ft)

Population (2018)
  - Total: 15,000
  - Density: 200/km^{2} (520/sq mi)
- Time zone: UTC+08:00 (China Standard)
- Postal code: 553600
- Area code: 0852

Sanjiang (simplified Chinese: 三江镇; traditional Chinese: 三江鎮; pinyin: Sānjiāng Zhèn; lit. 'three rivers') is a town of Daozhen Gelao and Miao Autonomous County, in northern Guizhou province, China, located 25 kilometres (16 mi) south-southwest of the county seat. As of 2011, it has four villages under its administration. As of the 2018, census it had a population of 15,000 and an area of 74.95-square-kilometre (28.94 sq mi).

== Administrative division ==
As of 2016, the town is divided into four villages:

- Sanjiang (三江村)
- Yunfeng (云峰村)
- Qunxin (群心村)
- Qunle (群乐村)

== Geography ==
The town is situated at southern Daozhen Gelao and Miao Autonomous County. It borders Shangba Tujia Ethnic Township in the northeast, Pingmu Town in the northwest, Longxing Town in the east, and Zheng'an County in the west and south.

== Economy ==
The principal industries in the town are agriculture, forestry and mineral resources. Commercial crops include peach and orange. The region abounds with coal, iron and asbestos.

== Tourist attractions ==
The Fairy Cave (仙女洞) is a popular attraction in the town.

The Dreamland Stone Forest (梦幻天城石林) is a well known tourist spot, famous for its strange stones.

== Transportation ==
The G69 Yinchuan–Baise Expressway passes across the town north to south.

== See also ==
- List of township-level divisions of Guizhou
