= List of township-level divisions of Guizhou =

Location of Guizhou province in China

This is a list of township-level divisions of the province of Guizhou, People's Republic of China. After province, prefecture, and county-level divisions, township-level divisions constitute the formal fourth-level administrative divisions of the PRC. This list is divided first into the prefecture-level then the county-level divisions. The six prefecture-level divisions of Guizhou are subdivided into 107 county-level divisions (15 districts, 7 county-level cities, 54 counties, 11 autonomous counties and 1 special district). Those are in turn divided into 1785 township-level divisions (691 towns (镇), 506 townships (乡), 252 ethnic townships (民族乡) and 94 subdistricts(街道)).

== Administrative divisions ==
All of these administrative divisions are explained in greater detail at Administrative divisions of the People's Republic of China. This chart lists only prefecture-level (街道) and county-level divisions of Guizhou.

== Guiyang (贵阳) ==
=== Nanming District (贵阳市) ===
Subdistrict (街道)

- Shifulu Subdistrict (市府路街道), Zhonghua South Road Subdistrict (中华南路街道), Youzhajie Subdistrict (油榨街街道), Xinhualu Subdistrict (新华路街道), Ergezhai Subdistrict (二戈寨街道), Big South Gate Subdistrict (大南门街道), Longdongbao Subdistrict (龙洞堡街道), Hebing Subdistrict (河滨街道), Taiciqiao Subdistrict (太慈桥街道), Xihulu Subdistrict (西湖路街道), Zhongcao Subdistrict (中曹街道), Zunyilu Subdistrict (遵义路街道)Xingguang Subdistrict (兴关街道), Shachong Subdistrict (沙冲街道)

Township (鄉)

- Yunguan (云关乡), Houchao (后巢乡), Yongyue (永乐乡)

Ethnic Minority Township (民族乡)

- Xiaobi Buyi Ethnic Minority Township (小碧布依族苗族乡)

=== Yunyan District (云岩区) ===
Subdistrict (街道)

- Zhonghua Central Road Subdistrict (中华中路街道), Zhongshan Eastern Road (中山东路街道), Zhongshan Western Road (中山西路街道), Zhonghua Northern Road (中华北路街道), Beijinglu Subdistrict (北京路街道), Yan'an Central Road Subdistrict (延安中路街道), Western City Road Subdistrict (市西路街道), Putuolu Subdistrict (普陀路街道), Huaichengbeilu (环城北路街道), Guiwulu Subdistrict (贵乌路街道), Qianlingdong Road Subdistrict (黔灵东路街道), Chengqinglu Subdistrict (威清路街道), Touqiao Subdistrict (头桥街道), Three bridges subdistrict (三桥街道), Zhaijilu (宅吉路街道), Jinguan Subdistrict (金关街道), Jinya Subdistrict (金鸭街道), Jinhui Subdistrict (金惠街道)

Town (镇)

- Qianling (黔灵镇)

=== Huaxi District (花溪区) ===
Subdistrict (街道)

- Guizhu (贵筑街道), Xibei (溪北街道)

Town (镇)

- Qingyan (青岩镇), Shiban (石板镇)

Township (鄉)

- Dangwu (党武乡), Jiu'an (久安乡), Maiping (麦坪乡), Yanlou (燕楼乡)

Other 其他

- Qingxishequ (清溪社区服务中心)

Miao Ethnic Minority Township (民族乡)

- Mengguan Miao Ethnic Minority Township (孟关苗族布依族乡), Huchao (湖潮苗族布依族乡), Gaopu (高坡苗族乡), Qiaopao (黔陶布依族苗族乡), Maling (马铃布依族苗族乡)

=== Wudang District (乌当区) ===
Subdistrict (街道)

- Xintian Subdistrict (新添街道), Gaoxinglu (高新路街道), Jinyang (金阳街道)

Town (镇)

- Zhuchang (朱昌镇), Dongfeng (东风镇), Shuitian (水田镇), Yangchang (羊昌镇), Jinhua (金华镇)

Township (鄉)

- Xiaba (下坝乡), Xinyang (新场乡), Baiyi (百宜乡)

County-Equivalent Region 类似乡级单位

- Sanjia Far (贵阳市三江农场)

Buyi Ethnic Minority Township (民族乡)

- Xinbaopu (新堡布依族乡), Pianpu (偏坡布依族乡)

=== Baiyun District (白云区) ===
Subdistrict (街道)

- Dashanhe (大山洞街道), Gongjiazhai (龚家寨街道), Yanshanhong (艳山红街道), Dulaying (都拉营街道)

Town (镇)

- Yanshanhong (艳山红镇), Maijia (麦架镇), Shawen (沙文镇)

Buyi Ethnic Minority Township (民族乡)

- Dula (都拉布依族乡), Niuyang (牛场布依族乡)

=== Guanshanhu District (观山湖区) ===
Subdistrict (街道)

- Jinyang Subdistrict (金阳街道)

Town (镇)

- Jinhua (金华镇), Zhuchang (朱昌镇)

Township (鄉)

- Baihua (百花湖乡)

=== Kaiyang County (开阳县) ===
Town (镇)

- Chengguan (城关镇), Shuangliu (双流镇), Jinzhong (金中镇), Fengsan (冯三镇), Nanmudu (楠木渡镇), Longyan (龙岗镇)

Township (鄉)

- Nanlong (南龙乡), Yongwen (|永温乡), Zhaiji (宅吉乡), Huali (花梨乡), Longshui (龙水乡), Miping (米坪乡), Maoyun (毛云乡)

Buyi and Miao Ethnic Minority Township (民族乡)

- Hefeng (禾丰布依族苗族乡), Nanjiang (南江布依族苗族乡), Gaozhai (高寨苗族布依族乡)

=== Xifeng County (息烽县) ===
Town (镇)

- Yongqing (永靖镇), Wenyuan (温泉镇), Jiuzhuang (九庄镇), Xiaozhaiba (小寨坝镇)

Township (鄉)

- Xishan (西山乡), Yanglongsi (养龙司乡), Shidong (石硐乡), Luwo (鹿窝乡), Liuchang (流长乡)

Miao Ethnic Minority Township (民族乡)

Qingshan, Xifeng (青山苗族乡)

=== Xiuwen County (修文县) ===
Town (镇)

- Longyang (龙场镇), Zhazuo (扎佐镇), Jiuchang (久长镇), Liuchang (六广镇)

Township (鄉)

- Gupao (谷堡乡), Liutun (六屯乡), Xiaoqing (小箐乡), Xiping (洒坪乡), Liutong (六桶乡)

Ethnic Minority Township (民族乡)

Dashi (大石布依族乡)

=== Qingzhen City (清镇市) ===
Subdistrict (街道)

- Qinglong Subdistrict (青龙街道)

Town (镇)

- Hongfenghu (红枫湖镇), Zhan (站街镇), Weicheng (卫城镇), Xindian (新店镇)

Township (鄉)

- Baihuahu (百花湖乡), Anliu (暗流乡), Liwo (犁倭乡)

Buyi and Miao Ethnic Minority Township (民族乡)

Maige (麦格苗族布依族乡), Wangzhuang (王庄布依族苗族乡), Liuchang (流长苗族乡)

== Liupanshui (六盘水) ==
=== Liuzhi Special District (六枝特区) ===
Town (镇)

- Pingzhai (平寨镇), Langdai (郎岱镇), Yanjiao (岩脚镇), Muyan (木岗镇), Dayong (大用镇)

Township (鄉)

- Xinyao (新窑乡), Xinyang (新场乡), Duoque (堕却乡), Longyang (龙场乡), Xinhua (新华乡)

Ethnic Minority Township (民族乡)

- Labie (落别布依族彝族乡), Zhexi (折溪彝族乡), Niuyang (牛场苗族彝族乡), Zhongzhai (中寨苗族彝族布依族乡), Qingkou (箐口彝族仡佬族布依族乡), Sazhi (洒志彝族布依族苗族乡), Maokou (毛口布依族苗族乡), Suojia (梭戛苗族彝族回族乡), Longjiao (陇脚布依族乡)

=== Pan County (盘县) ===
Town (镇)

- Hongguo (红果镇), Chengguan (城关镇), Panqiao (板桥镇), Shuitang (水塘镇), Mingzhu (民主镇), Dashan (大山镇), Baotian (保田镇), Laochang (老厂镇), Mayi (玛依镇), Shiqiao (石桥镇), Pingguan (平关镇), Xiangshui (响水镇), Huopu (火铺镇), Yueming (乐民镇), Xichong (西冲镇), Duanjiang (断江镇), Panjiang (盘江镇), Paiguo (柏果镇), Saji (洒基镇), Liuguan (刘官镇)

Township (鄉)

- Zhongyi (忠义乡), Xinmin (新民乡), Zhudong (珠东乡), Lianghe (两河乡), Huashi (滑石乡), Yingwu (英武乡)

Miao, Yi, and Bai Ethnic Minority Township (民族乡)

- Putian (普田回族乡), Jichangping (鸡场坪彝族乡), Songhe (松河彝族乡), Pingdi (坪地彝族乡), Sige (四格彝族乡), Yuni (淤泥彝族乡), Pugu (普古彝族苗族乡), Jiuying (旧营白族彝族苗族乡), Yangchang (羊场布依族白族苗族乡), Baoji (保基苗族彝族乡), Machang (马场彝族苗族乡)

=== Shuicheng County (水城县) ===
Town (镇)

- Lanba (滥坝镇)

Township (鄉)

- Ajia (阿戛乡), Yanjing (盐井乡), Panlong (蟠龙乡)

Miao, Hui, and Yi Ethnic Minority Township (民族乡)

- Dongde (董地苗族彝族乡), Douqing (陡箐苗族彝族乡), Bide (比德苗族彝族乡), Huale (化乐苗族彝族乡), Nankai (南开苗族彝族乡), Qinglin (青林苗族彝族乡), Baohua (保华苗族彝族乡), Jinpen (金盆苗族彝族乡), Muguo (木果彝族苗族乡), Faqing (发箐苗族彝族乡), Shuangjia (双戛彝族乡), Yushe (玉舍彝族苗族乡) Shaomi (勺米彝族苗族乡), Zhichang (纸厂彝族乡), Pingzhai (坪寨彝族乡), Fa'er (发耳布依族苗族彝族乡), Duge (都格布依族苗族彝族乡), Jichang (鸡场布依族彝族苗族乡), Longchang (龙场苗族白族彝族乡), Yingpan (营盘苗族彝族白族乡), Shunchang (顺场苗族彝族布依族乡), Huaga (花嘎苗族布依族彝族乡), Changhai (杨梅彝族苗族回族乡), Xinjie (新街彝族苗族布依族乡), Yezhong (野钟苗族彝族布依族乡), Guobu (果布嘎彝族苗族布依族乡), Miluo (米箩布依族苗族彝族乡), Houchang (猴场苗族布依族乡), Hongyan (红岩布依族彝族苗族乡)

=== Zhongshan District (钟山区) ===
Subdistrict (街道)

- Huangtudu (黄土坡街道), Hecheng (荷城街道), Fenghuang (凤凰街道), Dewu (德坞街道)

Township (鄉)

- Laoyingshan (老鹰山镇), Dahe (大河镇), Wangjiazhai (汪家寨镇), Dawan (大湾镇)

Ethnic Minority Township (民族乡)

- Yuezhao (月照彝族回族苗族乡)

== Zunyi (遵义) ==
=== Honghuagang District (红花岗区) ===
Subdistrict (街道)

- Laochen Subdistrict (老城街道), Wanli Road Subdistrict (万里路街道), Zhonghua Road subdistrict (中华路街道), Nanmenguan Subdistrict (南门关街道), Yan'an Road subdistrict (延安路街道), Zhoushuiqiao Subdistrict (舟水桥街道), Central Mountain Road Subdistrict (中山路街道), Beijinglu Subdistrict (北京路街道)

Town (镇)

- Changzheng (长征镇), Gangkou (巷口镇), Nanguan (南关镇), Zhongzhuan (忠庄镇), Hailong (海龙镇), Liangxi (深溪镇), Jindingshan (金鼎山镇), Xinpu (新蒲镇)

=== Huichuan District (汇川区) ===
Subdistrict (街道)

- Shanghailu Subdistrict (上海路街道), Ximalu Subdistrict (洗马路街道), Dalianlu Subdistrict (大连路街道)

Town (镇)

- Gaoqiao (高桥镇), Donggongsi (董公寺镇), Tuanze (团泽镇), Gaoping (高坪镇), Panqiao (板桥镇), Sidu (泗渡镇)

=== Bozhou District (播州区) ===
Town (镇)

- Nanbai (南白镇), Longkeng (龙坑镇), Sancha (三岔镇), Goujiang (苟江镇), Sanhe (三合镇), Wujiang (乌江镇), Xiazi (虾子镇), Sanpu (三渡镇), Xinzhou (新舟镇), Yongle (永乐镇), Longping (龙坪镇), Laba (喇叭镇), Tuanxi (团溪镇), Tiechang (铁厂镇), Xiping (西坪镇), Shangji (尚嵇镇), Maoli (茅栗镇), XinMin (新民镇), Yaxi (鸭溪镇), Shiban (石板镇), Yongshan (乐山镇), Fengxiang (枫香镇), Panshui (泮水镇), Mati (马蹄镇), Shawan (沙湾镇), Songlin (松林镇), Maoshi (毛石镇), Shanshen (山盆镇), Zhima (芝麻镇)

Ethnic Minority Township (民族乡)

Pingzheng (平正仡佬族乡), Hongguan (洪关苗族乡)

=== Tongzi County (桐梓县) ===
Town (镇)

=== Daozhen County (道真仡佬族 苗族自治县) ===
Subdistrict (街道)

- Yinzhen Subdistrict

Town (镇)

- Yuxi, Sanjiang, Longxing, Jiucheng, Zhongxin, Luolong, Yangxi, Sanqiao, Daqian, Pingmu, Hekou,

Township (鄉)

- Zongping Township, Taoyuan Township

Ethnic Minority Township (民族乡)

- Shangba Tujia Ethnic Township

=== Fenggang County (凤冈县) ===
Town (镇)

Township (鄉)

=== Meitan County (湄潭县) ===
Town (镇)

Township (鄉)

=== Renhuai City (仁怀市) ===
Town (镇)

Township (鄉)
