= Zunyi rapid transit system =

The Zunyi rapid transit system is a planned metro system in Zunyi, China.

== Project introduction ==
The system is planned as a monorail, and has already been examined and approved by the Ministry of Environmental Protection.

== Construction and plans ==
In 2013, the city of Zunyi began pushing for the acceptance of a mass transit plan.

The planning committee's 2019-2024 construction plan was evaluated and approved by the Ministry of Environmental Protection in July 2019.

=== Lines and operation ===
Line 1 of the system is expected to have 19 stations on a 22.86 kilometre long line running from the Guangjingnan Tunnel in Honghuagang District to Xinpudong station in the Xinpu New District.

Line 2 of the system is expected to be 27 kilometres long with 22 stations running from Zunyi Railway Station in the Huichuan District to Nanbai Secondary School in the Bozhou District. The line will reuse the old urban alignment of the Sichuan–Guizhou railway which was realigned east of the city.

The two lines will meet at Yingbin Avenue.
