= Sanqiao =

Sanqiao may refer to:

- Sanqiao language, a Hmongic language spoken in Liping County and Jinping County, Guizhou, China

== Places in China ==
- Sanqiao, Anhui (三桥), town in Huaining County, Anhui
- Sanqiao, Daozhen County (三桥), town in Daozhen Gelao and Miao Autonomous County, Guizhou
- Sanqiao Township, Henan (三桥乡), township in Runan County, Henan
- Sanqiao Township, Hunan (三锹乡), township in Jingzhou Miao and Dong Autonomous County, Hunan
- Sanqiao Subdistrict, Guiyang (三桥街道), subdistrict in Yunyan District, Guiyang, Guizhou
- Sanqiao Subdistrict, Taiyuan (三桥街道), subdistrict in Xinghualing District, Taiyuan, Shanxi
- Sanqiao Subdistrict, Xi'an (三桥街道), subdistrict in Weiyang District, Xi'an, Shaanxi
  - Sanqiao station
