= 播州 =

播州 may refer to:

- Bozhou District, a district of the city of Zunyi, Guizhou, China
- Harima Province, abbreviated name was following Banshū (播州), province of Japan located in what is today the southwestern part of Hyōgo Prefecture
