= Hekou, Daozhen County =

Hekou Town 河口镇
- Town
- Location in Guizhou
- Coordinates: 28°58′54″N 107°38′33″E
- Country: China
- Province: Guizhou
- Prefecture: Zunyi
- Autonomous county: Daozhen Gelao and Miao Autonomous County

Area
  - Total: 138.16 km^{2} (53.34 sq mi)

Population (2016)
  - Total: 15,000
  - Density: 110/km^{2} (280/sq mi)
- Time zone: UTC+08:00 (China Standard)
- Postal code: 563518
- Area code: 0851

Hekou (simplified Chinese: 河口镇; traditional Chinese: 河口鎮; pinyin: Hékǒu Zhèn) is a town in Daozhen Gelao and Miao Autonomous County, Guizhou, China. As of the 2016 census it had a population of 15,000 and an area of 138.16-square-kilometre (53.34 sq mi).

== Administrative division ==
As of 2016, the town is divided into seven villages:

- Shiqiao (石桥村)
- Xingmin (幸民村)
- Chetian (车田村)
- Meijiang (梅江村)
- Datian (大田村)
- Saba (三坝村)
- Zhulintang (竹林塘村)

== History ==
On January 14, 2016, it was upgraded to a town.

== Economy ==
The economy of the town is supported primarily by farming and ranching.

== See also ==
- List of township-level divisions of Guizhou
