= Zongping Township =

Zongping Township 棕坪乡
- Township
- Location in Guizhou
- Coordinates: 28°40′23″N 107°39′15″E
- Country: China
- Province: Guizhou
- Prefecture: Zunyi
- Autonomous county: Daozhen Gelao and Miao Autonomous County

Area
  - Total: 77.12 km^{2} (29.78 sq mi)

Population (2016)
  - Total: 14,000
  - Density: 180/km^{2} (470/sq mi)
- Time zone: UTC+08:00 (China Standard)
- Postal code: 563513
- Area code: 0851

Zongping Township (simplified Chinese: 棕坪乡; traditional Chinese: 棕坪鄉; pinyin: Zōngpíng Xiāng) is a township in Daozhen Gelao and Miao Autonomous County, Guizhou, China. As of the 2016 census it had a population of 14,000 and an area of 77.12-square-kilometre (29.78 sq mi).

== Administrative division ==
As of 2016, the township is divided into five villages:

- Shengli (胜利村)
- Cangpuxi (苍蒲溪村)
- Zhaoshan (照山村)
- Wenlian (文联村)
- Sili (斯里村)

== Economy ==
The economy of the township is supported primarily by farming, ranching and mineral resources. There are 4 million tons of coal resources in the township. Marble reserves reach 300,000,000-cubic-metre (1.1×10^{10} cu ft).

== See also ==
- List of township-level divisions of Guizhou
