= List of mountains in Daozhen Gelao and Miao Autonomous County =

Mountains in Guizhou county

The following is a list of mountains in Daozhen Gelao and Miao Autonomous County, Guizhou, China:

== List ==
Name (English)	Name (Chinese)	High (m)
Piaoguangliangzi	瓢广梁子	1440.9
Mazhuayan	麻抓岩	1939.9
Mount Leida	雷打山	1709.5
Niubixian	牛鼻纤	1675.5
Feishayan	飞沙岩	1921.5
Shisunya	石笋垭	1755.8
Mount Jilong	鸡笼山	1830.5
Mopanshi	磨盘石	1934.1
Mount Shiren	石人山	1403
Mount Pingmu	平模山	1730
Huajianzi	花尖子	1411.7
Shuibayan	水巴岩	1354
Gaofengsi	高峰寺	1017
Mount Fan	翻山	1301
Mount Chaqi	插旗山	1301
Mount Xiaohe	小河山	1634.6
Cishangai	磁山盖	1583
Maobiliang	猫鼻梁	1713
Manaojing	马脑箐	1688.7
Sunzigai	笋子盖	1086.9
Yingzui	鹰嘴	1562.8
Mount Jinzhu	金竹山	1450
Mount Yunding	云顶山	1575
Mount Niuxin	牛心山	991.5
Mount Douba	豆巴山	1419
Baimayan	白马岩	1745.7
Dabaoliangzi	大堡梁子	1569.5
Heishanliangzi	黑山梁子	1563
