= Daqian, Daozhen County =

Daqian Town 大磏镇
- Town
- Location in Guizhou
- Coordinates: 28°59′16″N 107°28′09″E
- Country: China
- Province: Guizhou
- Prefecture: Zunyi
- Autonomous county: Daozhen Gelao and Miao Autonomous County

Area
  - Total: 192.8 km^{2} (74.4 sq mi)

Population (2016)
  - Total: 25,000
  - Density: 130/km^{2} (340/sq mi)
- Time zone: UTC+08:00 (China Standard)
- Postal code: 563523
- Area code: 0851

Daqian (simplified Chinese: 大磏镇; traditional Chinese: 大磏鎮; pinyin: Dàqiān Zhèn) is a town in Daozhen Gelao and Miao Autonomous County, Guizhou, China. As of the 2016 census it had a population of 25,000 and an area of 192.8-square-kilometre (74.4 sq mi).

== Administrative division ==
As of 2016, the town is divided into six villages:

- Daqian (大磏村)
- Qianba (磏坝村)
- Fuxing (福星村)
- Wenjiaba (文家坝村)
- Sanyuan (三元村)

== Geography ==
The highest point in the town stands 1,500 metres (4,900 ft) above sea level. The lowest point is at 600 metres (2,000 ft) above sea level.

The town enjoys a subtropical humid monsoon climate, with an average annual temperature of 16 °C (61 °F) to 19 °C (66 °F) and total annual rainfall of 1,120-millimetre (44 in).

== See also ==
- List of township-level divisions of Guizhou
