= Zhongguan =

Zhongguan could refer to the following towns in China:

- Zhongguan, Guizhou (中观), in Zheng'an County, Guizhou
- Zhongguan, Hebei (中关), in Longhua County, Hebei
- Zhongguan, Jiangxi (中馆), in Duchang County, Jiangxi
- Zhongguan, Zhejiang (钟管), in Deqing County, Zhejiang

== See also ==
- Zhongguancun, a neighborhood and technology hub in Haidian District, Beijing, China
