= Jiucheng, Daozhen County =

Jiucheng Town 旧城镇
- Town
- Location in Guizhou
- Coordinates: 28°44′27″N 107°40′37″E
- Country: China
- Province: Guizhou
- Prefecture: Zunyi
- Autonomous county: Daozhen Gelao and Miao Autonomous County

Area
  - Total: 167 km^{2} (64 sq mi)

Population (2016)
  - Total: 26,000
  - Density: 160/km^{2} (400/sq mi)
- Time zone: UTC+08:00 (China Standard)
- Postal code: 563509
- Area code: 0851

Jiucheng (simplified Chinese: 旧城镇; traditional Chinese: 舊城鎮; pinyin: Jiùchéng Zhèn) is a town in Daozhen Gelao and Miao Autonomous County, Guizhou, China. As of the 2016 census it had a population of 26,000 and an area of 167-square-kilometre (64 sq mi). It has been hailed as "Hometown of Nuo opera".

== Etymology ==
The town was the capital of Zhen'an Zhou. After the relocation of the capital, it hence the name of "Jiucheng", which means "Old city".

== Administrative division ==
As of 2016, the town is divided into six villages:

- Jiucheng (旧城村)
- Hexi (河西村)
- Changba (长坝村)
- Huaiping (槐坪村)
- Guanba (关坝村)
- Yongcheng (永城村)

== Geography ==
=== Climate ===
The town has a subtropical humid monsoon climate with an average annual temperature of 22.5 °C (72.5 °F) and a maximum temperature of 335 °C (635 °F); the annual average rainfall is 1,200 millimetres (47 in).

== Economy ==
The main industries in and around the town are breading industry and farming.

== See also ==
- List of township-level divisions of Guizhou
