= Taoyuan Township, Daozhen County =

Taoyuan Township 桃源乡
- Township
- Location in Guizhou
- Coordinates: 28°53′04″N 107°45′15″E
- Country: China
- Province: Guizhou
- Prefecture: Zunyi
- Autonomous county: Daozhen Gelao and Miao Autonomous County

Area
  - Total: 106.15 km^{2} (40.98 sq mi)
- Elevation: 880 m (2,890 ft)

Population (2016)
  - Total: 10,000
  - Density: 94/km^{2} (240/sq mi)
- Time zone: UTC+08:00 (China Standard)
- Postal code: 563516
- Area code: 0851

Taoyuan Township (simplified Chinese: 桃源乡; traditional Chinese: 桃源鄉; pinyin: Táoyuán Xiāng) is a township in Daozhen Gelao and Miao Autonomous County, Guizhou, China. As of the 2016 census it had a population of 10,000 and an area of 106.15-square-kilometre (40.98 sq mi). There are four minorities live in the town, Gelao, Miao, Tujia and Mongolian.

== History ==
In history, it came under the jurisdiction of Zhongxin Town. It was incorporated as a town in 1993.

== Administrative division ==
As of 2016, the township is divided into three villages:

- Taoyuan (桃源村)
- Qunyi (群益村)
- Qingxi (清溪村)

== Geography ==
The highest point in the township stands 1,713 metres (5,620 ft) above sea level. The lowest point is at 360 metres (1,180 ft) above sea level.

The Furong River (芙蓉江) flow through the township.

The township is in the subtropical monsoon climate zone, with an average annual temperature of 21 °C (70 °F), total annual rainfall of 1,100-millimetre (43 in), and a frost-free period of 248 days.

== Economy ==
The township's economy is based on nearby mineral resources and agricultural resources. There are more than 4 million tons of aluminum ore here. Other mineral resources are: iron, lead, copper, and silver.

== See also ==
- List of township-level divisions of Guizhou
