= Zhongguan, Guizhou =

Zhongguan 中观镇
- Town
- Location in China
- Coordinates: 28°25′55″N 107°36′5″E
- Country: People's Republic of China
- Province: Guizhou
- Prefecture-level city: Zunyi
- County: Zheng'an County
- Time zone: UTC+8 (China Standard)

Zhongguan (simplified Chinese: 中观; traditional Chinese: 中觀) is a town in Zheng'an County, in Guizhou province, China. As of 2018, it has one residential community and 6 villages under its administration.

== See also ==
- List of township-level divisions of Guizhou
