= Yinzhen (disambiguation) =

Yinzhen usually refers to the name of Yongzheng Emperor (Aisin Gioro Yinzhen).

Yinzhen may also refer to:

- Yinzhen Subdistrict (Zunyi) in Zunyi, Guizhou Province.
- Yinzhen Subdistrict (Xi'an) in Chang'an District, Xi'an, Shaanxi Province.
- Baihao Yinzhen, a white tea
- Junshan Yinzhen, a yellow tea
- Yinzhen railway station in Yinzhen Subdistrict, Chang'an District, Xi'an, Shaanxi Province
