= Yuxi, Daozhen County =

Yuxi Town 玉溪镇
- Town
- Location in Guizhou
- Coordinates: 28°51′57″N 107°36′20″E
- Country: China
- Province: Guizhou
- Prefecture: Zunyi
- Autonomous county: Daozhen Gelao and Miao Autonomous County

Area
  - Total: 245.89 km^{2} (94.94 sq mi)

Population (2016)
  - Total: 76,379
  - Density: 310.62/km^{2} (804.51/sq mi)
- Time zone: UTC+08:00 (China Standard)
- Postal code: 563502
- Area code: 0851

Yuxi (simplified Chinese: 玉溪镇; traditional Chinese: 玉溪鎮; pinyin: Yùxī Zhèn) is a town in Daozhen Gelao and Miao Autonomous County, Guizhou, China. As of the 2016 census it had a population of 76,379 and an area of 245.89-square-kilometre (94.94 sq mi).

== Administrative division ==
As of 2016, the town is divided into eight villages:

- Chengguan (城关村)
- Bayu (巴渔村)
- Chi (池村)
- Songjiang (淞江村)
- Dalu (大路村)
- Panxi (蟠溪村)
- Wuba (五八村)
- Tuchengba (土城坝村)

== Geography ==
The highest point in the town stands 1,625.2 metres (5,332 ft) above sea level. The lowest point is at 376 metres (1,234 ft) above sea level.

Furong River (芙蓉江), Mei River (梅江), Bayu Stream (巴渔溪), Yu Stream (玉溪), Pan Stream (蟠溪), Shuicun Stream (水村河) flow through the town.

=== Climate ===
Yuxi is in the subtropical humid monsoon climate zone, with an average annual temperature of 15.6 °C (60.1 °F), total annual rainfall of 1,070-millimetre (42 in), a frost-free period of 250 days and annual average sunshine hours about 1000 to 1100 hours. The highest temperature is 26.1 °C (79.0 °F), and the lowest temperature is 4.6 °C (40.3 °F).

== Economy ==
The economy is supported primarily by farming, ranching and mineral resources. Mineral resources include phosphate iron, hematite, coal line, glass, granite, calcite, silica, manganese, etc. In 2022, Yuxi accomplished a regional GDP of 252.06 billion yuan, with a growth of 4.3% at comparable prices. Among them, the added value of the primary industry was 24.73 billion yuan, an increase of 5.0%; the added value of the secondary industry was 113.03 billion yuan, an increase of 6.7%; and the added value of the tertiary industry was 114.30 billion yuan, an increase of 2.0%.

== Tourist attractions ==
The main attractions are the Yundingshan Scenic Spot (云顶山风景区), Shaba Reservoir (沙坝水库), Songjiang Rafting (淞江漂流), and Songjiang Hot Spring (淞江温泉).

Panxi Temple (蟠溪寺) is a Buddhist temple located in the town, which was originally built in the Yuan dynasty (1271–1368).

Wantian Palace (万天宫) is a Taoist temple built in the Daoguang period (1821–1850) of the Qing dynasty (1644–1911), which has been designated as a provincial key cultural unit.

== See also ==
- List of township-level divisions of Guizhou
