= Yangxi =

Yangxi may refer to:

- Yangxi County (阳西县), a county in Guangdong, China

== Towns ==
- Yangxi, Anhui (扬溪), in Jixi County, Anhui, China
- Yangxi, Fujian (洋溪), in Meilie District, Sanming, Fujian, China
- Yangxi, Daozhen County (阳溪), in Daozhen Gelao and Miao Autonomous County, Guizhou, China
- Yangxi, Yinjiang County (洋溪), in Yinjiang Tujia and Miao Autonomous County, Guizhou, China
- Yangxi, Hunan (洋溪), in Xinhua County, Hunan, China
- Yangxi, Anfu County (洋溪), in Anfu County, Jiangxi, China
- Yangxi, Sichuan (洋溪), in Shehong County, Sichuan, China

== Townships ==
- Yangxi Township, Guangxi (洋溪乡), in Sanjiang Dong Autonomous County, Guangxi, China
- Yangxi Township, Guangchang County (杨溪乡), in Guangchang County, Jiangxi, China
- Yangxi Township, Yujiang County (杨溪乡), in Yujiang County, Jiangxi, China

== See also ==
- Yang Xi (disambiguation)
