= Zhongxin =

Zhongxin may refer to:

- Zhongxin, Daozhen County, a town in Daozhen County, Guizhou, China
- Zhongxin, Huaping County, a town in Huaping County, Yunnan, China
