= Luolong, Daozhen County =

Luolong Town 洛龙镇
- Town
- Location in Guizhou
- Coordinates: 29°03′52″N 107°42′25″E
- Country: China
- Province: Guizhou
- Prefecture: Zunyi
- Autonomous county: Daozhen Gelao and Miao Autonomous County

Area
  - Total: 226.36 km^{2} (87.40 sq mi)

Population (2016)
  - Total: 20,000
  - Density: 88/km^{2} (230/sq mi)
- Time zone: UTC+08:00 (China Standard)
- Postal code: 563517
- Area code: 0851

Luolong (simplified Chinese: 洛龙镇; traditional Chinese: 洛龍鎮; pinyin: Luòlóng Zhèn) is a town in Daozhen Gelao and Miao Autonomous County, Guizhou, China. As of the 2016 census it had a population of 20,000 and an area of 226.36-square-kilometre (87.40 sq mi). There are four ethnic groups living in the town, including Han, Gelao, Miao, Tujia and Yi.

== Administrative division ==
As of 2016, the town is divided into five villages and one community:

- Dingshiba Community (丁氏坝社区)
- Luolong (洛龙村)
- Wuyi (五一村)
- Sanyuan (三院村)
- Yingzui (鹰咀村)
- Datang (大塘村)
- Longqiao (龙桥村)

== Geography ==
The highest point in the town stands 1,964 metres (6,444 ft) above sea level. The lowest point is at 530 metres (1,740 ft) above sea level.

The town is in the subtropical humid monsoon climate, with an average annual temperature of 22 °C (72 °F), total annual rainfall of 1,170-millimetre (46 in), and a frost-free period of 240 days.

The Luolong River (洛龙河), also known as "Flower Stream" (花溪), flows through the town.

== Economy ==
The town's economy is based on nearby mineral resources and agricultural resources. The main mineral resources are iron and coal.

== Tourist attractions ==
The Mopanshan Scenic Spot (磨盘山风景区) is a famous scenic spot.

Guanyin Rock (观音岩) is a Buddhist temple in the town, which was originally built in the Yuan dynasty (1271–1368).

Ox Horn Village (牛角寨) is a tourism resort in the town.

== See also ==
- List of township-level divisions of Guizhou
