= Sanhe, Bozhou District =

Sanhe 三合镇
- Town
- Location relative to Sichuan
- Coordinates: 27°25′03″N 106°45′58″E
- Country: People's Republic of China
- Province: Guizhou
- Prefecture-level city: Zunyi
- District: Bozhou District
- Village-level divisions: 4 residential communities 8 villages
- Elevation: 975 m (3,199 ft)
- Time zone: UTC+8 (China Standard)
- Area code: 0832

Sanhe (Chinese: 三合; pinyin: Sānhé) is a town of Bozhou District, Zunyi in northern Guizhou, People's Republic of China, located 14 kilometres (8.7 mi) south-southwest of the county seat. As of 2018, it has 4 residential communities and 8 villages under its administration. The town is situated along China National Highway 210 and G75 Lanzhou–Haikou Expressway.

== See also ==
- List of township-level divisions of Guizhou
