= Shizi Bridge =

Bridge in China

Shizi Bridge 狮子桥
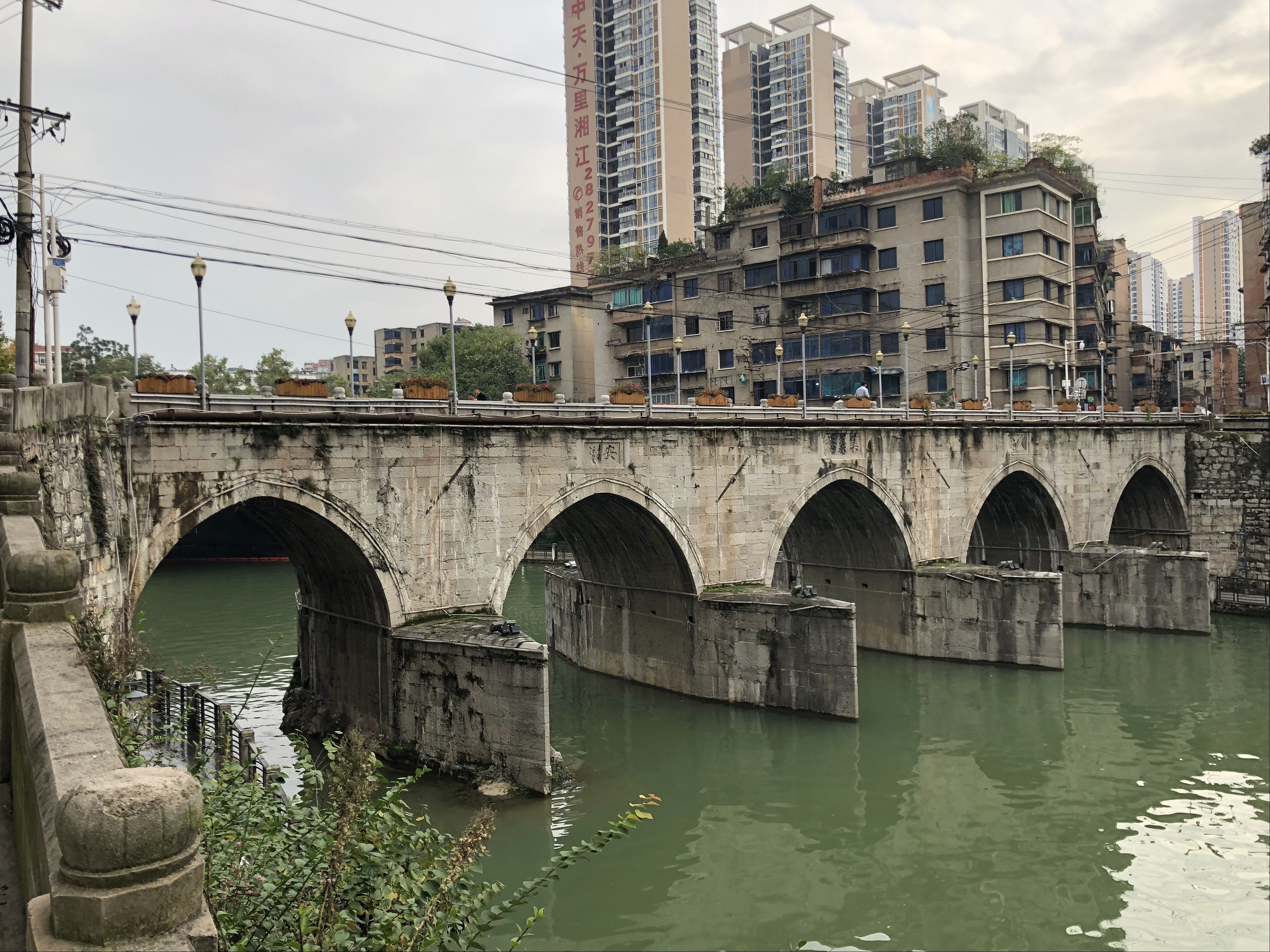
- Shizi Bridge.
- Coordinates: 27°40′50″N 106°55′28″E
- Crosses: Xiang River
- Locale: Honghuagang District, Zunyi, Guizhou, China

Characteristics
- Design: Arch Bridge
- Material: Stone
- Total length: 52.6 metres (173 ft)
- Width: 7.2 metres (24 ft)
- Height: 12 metres (39 ft)

History
- Construction start: 1368
- Construction end: 1917 (reconstruction)

Location
- Interactive map of Shizi Bridge

The Guanyin Bridge (simplified Chinese: 狮子桥; traditional Chinese: 獅子橋; pinyin: Shīzǐ Qiáo; lit. 'Lion Bridge'), formerly known as Tongyuan Bridge (Chinese: 通远桥), Sizi Bridge (Chinese: 嗣子桥) or Jiyi Bridge (Chinese: 集义桥), is a historic stone arch bridge over the Xiang River in Honghuagang District of Zunyi, Guizhou, China.

== History ==
The bridge was originally built as "Tongyuan Bridge" (Chinese: 通远桥; lit. 'Bridge of leading to the distance') in 1368, at the dawn of the Ming dynasty (1368–1644). It was one of the "Eight Views of Zunyi" (遵义八景) during that time.

In 1796, in the reign of Jiaqing Emperor of the Qing dynasty (1644–1911), the bridge was destroyed by a catastrophic flood. A local magnate donated property to rebuild it for asking the god to bless him to have a son. After completion, the bridge was renamed "Sizi Bridge" (Chinese: 嗣子桥). The pronunciation of the characters "Sizi" (嗣子) and "Shizi" (狮子) are similar, so the local people called it "Shizi Bridge".

In 1916, the bridge was devastated by a devastating flood again. The reconstruction project of the bridge was launched in the autumn of that same year and was completed in spring of the next year. The name was changed to "Jiyi Bridge" (集义桥). Tang Jiyao, the then Military Governor of Yunnan, attended the opening ceremony.

During the ten-year Cultural Revolution, the stone sculptures on the bridge was demolished by the Red Guards. In May 1986, Zunyi Municipal Government appropriated a large sum of money for redecorating. In December 2003, it was designated as a municipal level cultural relic preservation organ by the local government.

== Architecture ==
The bridge measures 52.6 metres (173 ft) long, 7.2 metres (24 ft) wide, and approximately 12 metres (39 ft) high. There are stone lions, stone arhats, stone drums and other stone carvings on the bridge.
