= Pingmu =

Pingmu Town 平模镇
- Town
- Location in Guizhou
- Coordinates: 28°48′41″N 107°26′29″E
- Country: China
- Province: Guizhou
- Prefecture: Zunyi
- Autonomous county: Daozhen Gelao and Miao Autonomous County

Area
  - Total: 90.6 km^{2} (35.0 sq mi)

Population (2016)
  - Total: 20,000
  - Density: 220/km^{2} (570/sq mi)
- Time zone: UTC+08:00 (China Standard)
- Postal code: 563526
- Area code: 0851

Pingmu (simplified Chinese: 平模镇; traditional Chinese: 平模鎮; pinyin: Píngmú Zhèn) is a town in Daozhen Gelao and Miao Autonomous County, Guizhou, China. As of the 2016 census it had a population of 20,000 and an area of 90.6-square-kilometre (35.0 sq mi).

== Administrative division ==
As of 2016, the town is divided into three villages:

- Pingmu (平模村)
- Xingbao (兴宝村)
- Shunhe (顺河村)

== Geography ==
The highest point in the town stands 1,782.4 metres (5,848 ft) above sea level. The lowest point is at 548.6 metres (1,800 ft) above sea level.

The town is in the subtropical humid monsoon climate, with an average annual temperature of 15.6 °C (60.1 °F), total annual rainfall of 1,070-millimetre (42 in), and a frost-free period of 260 days.

== Economy ==
The town's economy is based on nearby mineral resources and agricultural resources. It is rich in limestone, silica, refractory clay and asbestos. The main cash crops are medicinal materials and tobacco.

== See also ==
- List of township-level divisions of Guizhou
