= Sanqiao, Daozhen County =

Sanqiao Town 三桥镇
- Town
- Location in Guizhou
- Coordinates: 29°03′38″N 107°30′17″E
- Country: China
- Province: Guizhou
- Prefecture: Zunyi
- Autonomous county: Daozhen Gelao and Miao Autonomous County

Area
  - Total: 229.2 km^{2} (88.5 sq mi)

Population (2016)
  - Total: 30,000
  - Density: 130/km^{2} (340/sq mi)
- Time zone: UTC+08:00 (China Standard)
- Postal code: 563521
- Area code: 0851

Sanqiao (simplified Chinese: 三桥镇; traditional Chinese: 三橋鎮; pinyin: Sānqiáo Zhèn) is a town in Daozhen Gelao and Miao Autonomous County, Guizhou, China. As of the 2016 census it had a population of 30,000 and an area of 229.2-square-kilometre (88.5 sq mi).

== Administrative division ==
As of 2016, the town is divided into eight villages:

- Qiaotang (桥塘村)
- Xiajiagou (夏家沟村)
- Tang (塘村)
- Fengshan (凤山村)
- Xinsheng (新生村)
- Beiyuan (北园村)
- Chengjiaba (程家坝村)
- Jielong (接龙村)

== Geography ==
The highest point in the town stands 1,939.9 metres (6,365 ft) above sea level. The lowest point is at 450 metres (1,480 ft) above sea level.

The town is in the subtropical humid monsoon climate, with an average annual temperature of 16 °C (61 °F), total annual rainfall of 900-millimetre (35 in) to 1,100-millimetre (43 in), and a frost-free period of 240 days.

== See also ==
- List of township-level divisions of Guizhou
