= Yangxi, Daozhen County =

Yangxi Town 阳溪镇
- Town
- Location in Guizhou
- Coordinates: 29°03′52″N 107°42′25″E
- Country: China
- Province: Guizhou
- Prefecture: Zunyi
- Autonomous county: Daozhen Gelao and Miao Autonomous County

Area
  - Total: 185.4 km^{2} (71.6 sq mi)
- Elevation: 1,300 m (4,300 ft)

Population (2016)
  - Total: 13,000
  - Density: 70/km^{2} (180/sq mi)
- Time zone: UTC+08:00 (China Standard)
- Postal code: 563519
- Area code: 0851

Yangxi (simplified Chinese: 阳溪镇; traditional Chinese: 陽溪鎮; pinyin: Yángxī Zhèn) is a town in Daozhen Gelao and Miao Autonomous County, Guizhou, China. As of the 2016 census it had a population of 13,000 and an area of 185.4-square-kilometre (71.6 sq mi).

== Administrative division ==
As of 2016, the town is divided into four villages:

- Yangxi (阳溪村)
- Siping (四坪村)
- Longtai (龙台村)
- Yangba (阳坝村)

== Geography ==
The highest point in the town stands 1,900 metres (6,200 ft) above sea level.

The town is in the subtropical humid monsoon climate, with an average annual temperature of 20 °C (68 °F), total annual rainfall of 1,100-millimetre (43 in), and a frost-free period of 220 days.

== Economy ==
The economy is supported primarily by farming and ranching. The main cash crop is medicinal materials.

== See also ==
- List of township-level divisions of Guizhou
