= Yinzhen Subdistrict (Zunyi) =

Yinzhen Subdistrict 尹珍街道
- Subdistrict
- Location in Guizhou
- Coordinates: 28°53′28″N 107°36′27″E
- Country: China
- Province: Guizhou
- Prefecture-level city: Zunyi
- Autonomous county: Daozhen Gelao and Miao Autonomous County
- Time zone: UTC+08:00 (China Standard)
- Postal code: 563502
- Area code: 0851

Yinzhen Subdistrict (Chinese: 尹珍街道; pinyin: Yǐnzhēn Jiēdào) is a subdistrict in Daozhen Gelao and Miao Autonomous County, Zunyi, Guizhou, China.

== Etymology ==
The name of "Yinzhen" is named after Yin Zhen, a Confucian scholar who lived during the Eastern Han dynasty (25–220) and was one of "Three Sages of Han in Guizhou", the other two were She Ren (舍人) and Sheng Lan (盛览). The name of "Daozhen (Gelao and Miao Autonomous County)" is also named after his courtesy name "Daozhen" (道真).

== Administrative division ==
As of 2016, the subdistrict is divided into one village and three communities:

- Xincheng Community (新城社区)
- Yongcheng Community (永城社区)
- East Street Community (东街社区)
- Sangmuba (桑木坝村)

== Economy ==
The town's economy is based on business.

== See also ==
- List of township-level divisions of Guizhou
