= Longxing, Daozhen County =

Longxing Town 隆兴镇
- Town
- Location in Guizhou
- Coordinates: 28°40′35″N 107°32′44″E
- Country: China
- Province: Guizhou
- Prefecture: Zunyi
- Autonomous county: Daozhen Gelao and Miao Autonomous County

Area
  - Total: 167.52 km^{2} (64.68 sq mi)

Population (2016)
  - Total: 32,100
  - Density: 192/km^{2} (496/sq mi)
- Time zone: UTC+08:00 (China Standard)
- Postal code: 563500
- Area code: 0851

Longxing (simplified Chinese: 隆兴镇; traditional Chinese: 隆興鎮; pinyin: Lóngxīng Zhèn) is a town in Daozhen Gelao and Miao Autonomous County, Guizhou, China. As of the 2016 census it had a population of 32,100 and an area of 167.52-square-kilometre (64.68 sq mi).

== Administrative division ==
As of 2016, the town is divided into nine villages:

- Aiguo (爱国村)
- Lianxing (联兴村)
- Qianjin (前进村)
- Sanlong (三龙村)
- Dalian (大联村)
- Lianchi (莲池村)
- Wanxi (浣溪村)
- Yonghong (永红村)
- Shamu (杉木村)

== Economy ==
The town's main industries are agriculture, breading industry, and mining service. Tobacco is the main source of local income.

== Tourist attractions ==
Mopan Mountain (磨盘山) is a famous scenic spot in the town.

The main attraction is the Huangni Cave (黄泥洞).

== See also ==
- List of township-level divisions of Guizhou
