= Zhongxin, Daozhen County =

Zhongxin Town 忠信镇
- Town
- Location in Guizhou
- Coordinates: 28°56′21″N 107°42′26″E
- Country: China
- Province: Guizhou
- Prefecture: Zunyi
- Autonomous county: Daozhen Gelao and Miao Autonomous County

Area
  - Total: 155.66 km^{2} (60.10 sq mi)

Population (2016)
  - Total: 22,000
  - Density: 140/km^{2} (370/sq mi)
- Time zone: UTC+08:00 (China Standard)
- Postal code: 563514
- Area code: 0851

Zhongxin (simplified Chinese: 忠信镇; traditional Chinese: 忠信鎮; pinyin: Zhōngxìn Zhèn) is a town in Daozhen Gelao and Miao Autonomous County, Guizhou, China. As of the 2016 census it had a population of 22,000 and an area of 155.66-square-kilometre (60.10 sq mi).

== Administrative division ==
As of 2016, the town is divided into seven villages:

- Xinhua (新华村)
- Minxing (民星村)
- Shisun (石笋村)
- Xinmin (新民村)
- Ganshuwan (甘树湾村)
- Shuishijiao (水石脚村)
- Shanyan (山岩村)

== Geography ==
The Furong River (芙蓉江) flows through the town.

The town enjoys a subtropical humid monsoon climate, enjoying four distinct seasons and abundant precipitation. The average annual temperature is 13.6 °C (56.5 °F) and total annual rainfall is about 1,000-millimetre (39 in) to 1,200-millimetre (47 in).

== Economy ==
The town's economy is based on nearby mineral resources and agricultural resources. The main mineral resources are lead-zinc, pyrite and bauxite. Medicinal materials and tobacco are the main economic crops.

== See also ==
- List of township-level divisions of Guizhou
