= Houweizhai station =

Underground Train Station

Coordinates: 34.3016°N 108.8088°E

Houweizhai 后卫寨
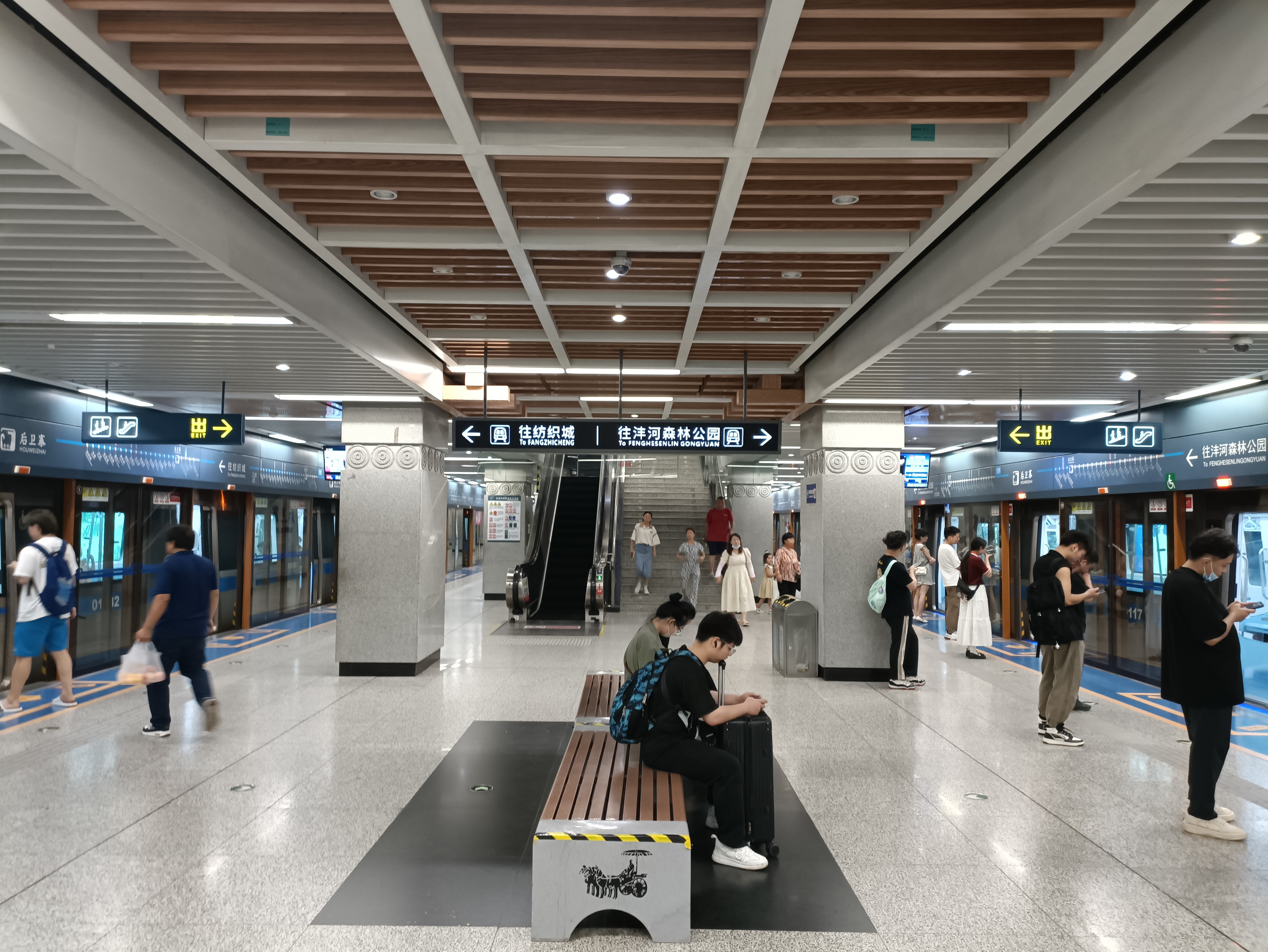

General information
- Location: Weiyang District, Xi'an, Shaanxi; China
- Operated by: Xi'an Metro Co. Ltd.
- Line: Line 1
- Platforms: 2 (1 island platform)

Construction
- Structure type: Underground

History
- Opened: 15 September 2013

Services
Preceding station	Xi'an Metro	Following station
Fengdongzimaoyuan towards Xianyangxizhan	Line 1	Sanqiao towards Fangzhicheng
Location

Houweizhai station (Chinese: 后卫寨站) is a station of Line 1 of the Xi'an Metro. It started operations on 15 September 2013.
