= Shangba Tujia Ethnic Township =

Shangba Tujia Ethnic Township 上坝土家族乡
- Ethnic township
- Location in Guizhou
- Coordinates: 28°49′29″N 107°34′40″E
- Country: China
- Province: Guizhou
- Prefecture: Zunyi
- Autonomous county: Daozhen Gelao and Miao Autonomous County

Area
  - Total: 99.67 km^{2} (38.48 sq mi)

Population (2016)
  - Total: 18,000
  - Density: 180/km^{2} (470/sq mi)
- Time zone: UTC+08:00 (China Standard)
- Postal code: 563501
- Area code: 0851

Shangba Tujia Ethnic Township (simplified Chinese: 上坝土家族乡; traditional Chinese: 上壩土家族鄉; pinyin: Shàngbà Tǔjiāzú Xiāng) is a township in Daozhen Gelao and Miao Autonomous County, Guizhou, China. As of the 2016 census it had a population of 18,000 and an area of 99.67-square-kilometre (38.48 sq mi).

== Administrative division ==
As of 2016, the township is divided into three villages:

- Bayi (八一村)
- Xintianba (新田坝村)
- Shuanghe (双河村)

== Economy ==
The town's economy is based on nearby mineral resources and agricultural resources. Mineral resources in the township are coal, iron, and silicate. Economic crops include Kiwifruit and medicinal materials.

== Tourist attractions ==
The main attraction is a karst cave named "Xianmi Cave" (仙米洞).

== See also ==
- List of township-level divisions of Guizhou
