= Yang Xi =

Yang Xi may refer to:

- Yang Xi (Three Kingdoms) (died 261), Shu Han politician and writer
- Yang Xi (mystic) (330–c. 386), Taoist mystic, writer, and calligrapher of the Jin period
- Yang Xi (volleyball) (born 1956), Chinese volleyball player
- Alex Yang (born 2005), Spanish-born Chinese footballer

== See also ==
- Yangxi (disambiguation)
