= Sanqiao station =

Metro station in Xi'an, China

Sanqiao 三桥
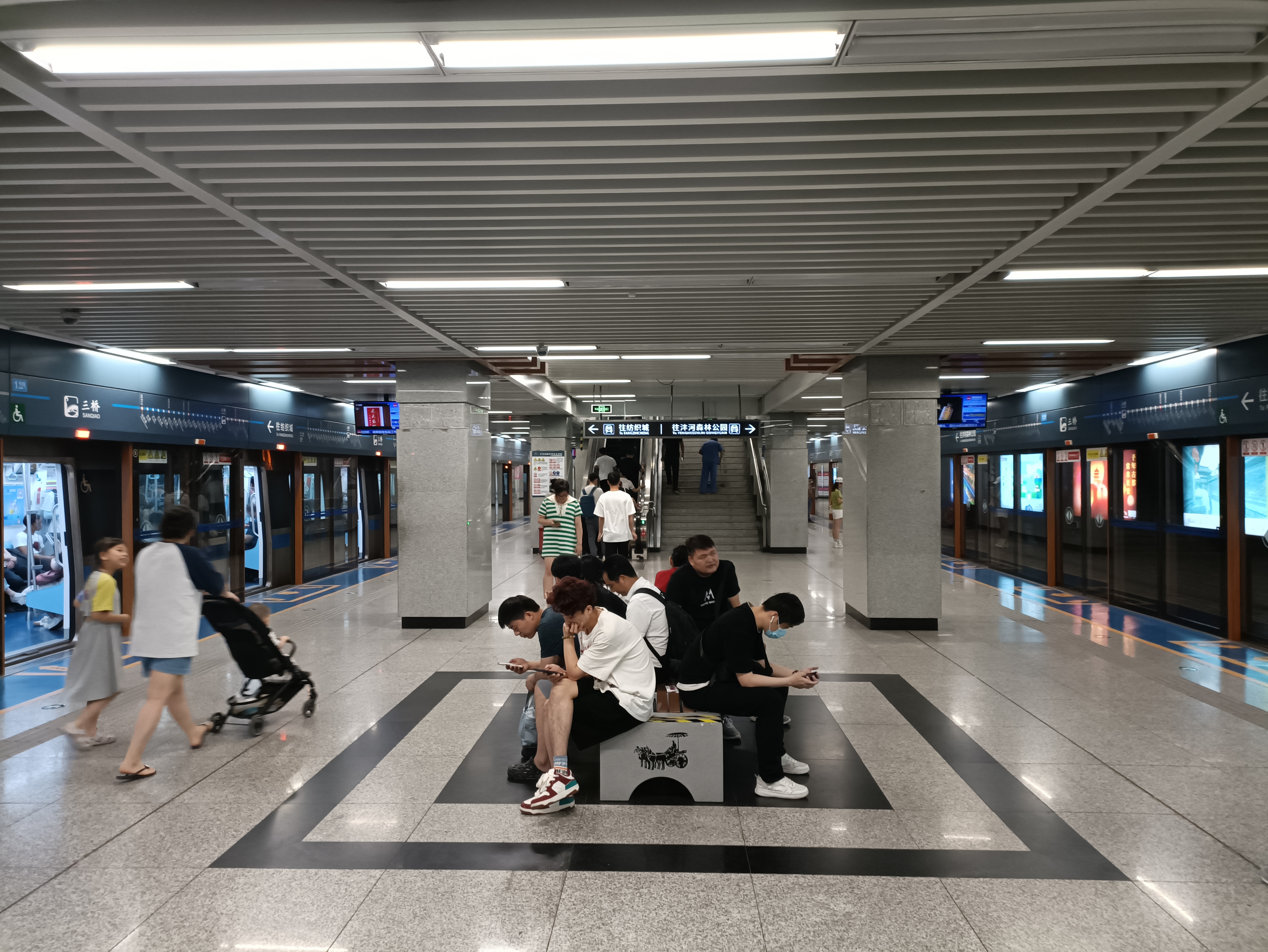

General information
- Location: Weiyang District, Xi'an, Shaanxi; China
- Coordinates: 34.2915°N 108.82758°E
- Operated by: Xi'an Metro Co. Ltd.
- Line: Line 1
- Platforms: 2 (1 island platform)

Construction
- Structure type: Underground

History
- Opened: 15 September 2013

Services
Preceding station	Xi'an Metro	Following station
Houweizhai towards Xianyangxizhan	Line 1	Zaohe towards Fangzhicheng
Location

Sanqiao station (Chinese: 三桥站) is a station on Line 1 of the Xi'an Metro. It started operations on 15 September 2013.
