= Huichuan, Zunyi =

Huichuan 汇川区
- District
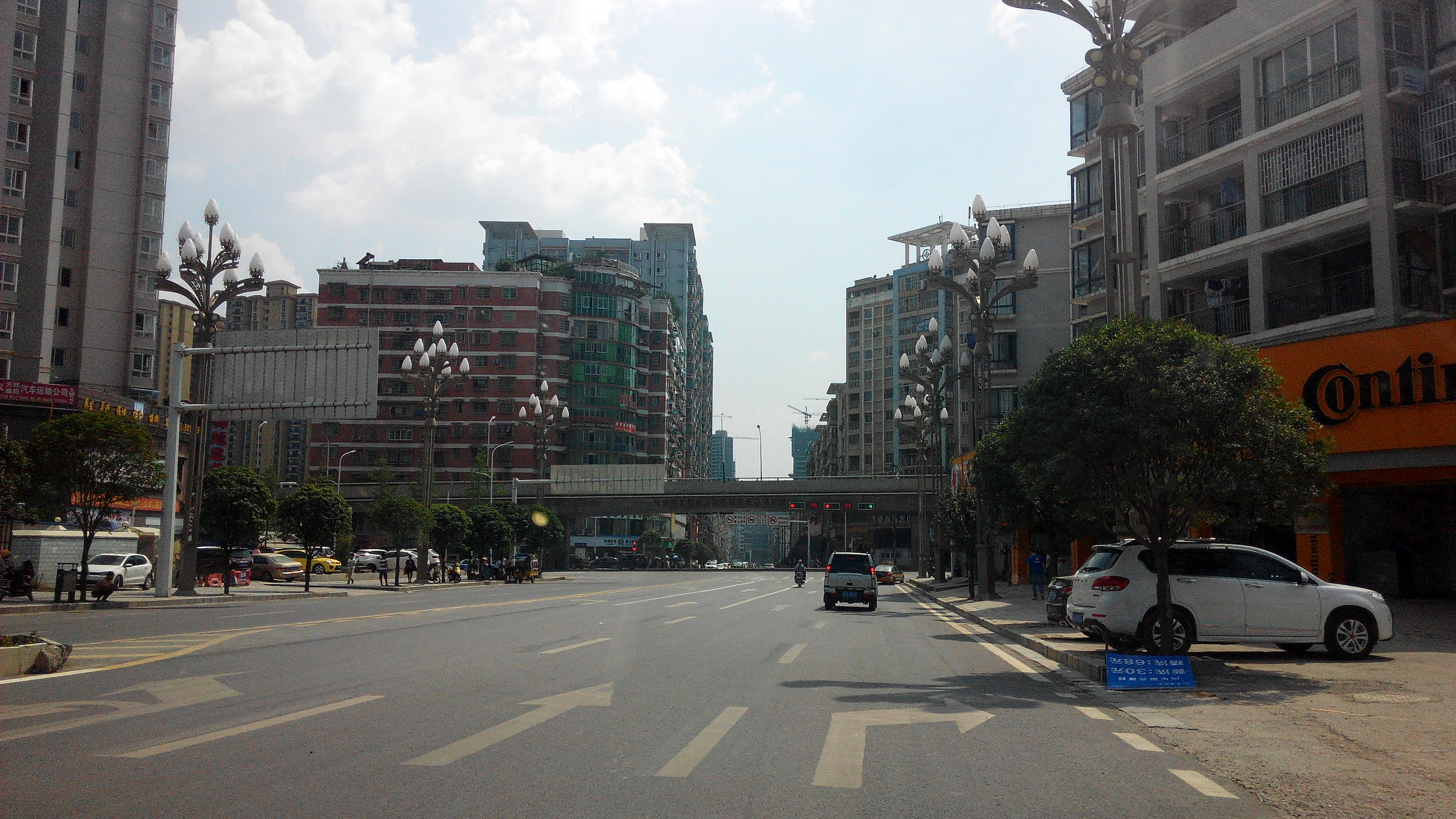

- Location of the seat in Guizhou Huichuan (Southwest China)
- Coordinates (Huichuan District government): 27°45′00″N 106°56′03″E
- Country: China
- Province: Guizhou
- Prefecture-level city: Zunyi

Area
  - Total: 611.23 km^{2} (236.00 sq mi)

Population (2020)
  - Total: 627,721
  - Density: 1,027.0/km^{2} (2,659.9/sq mi)
- Time zone: UTC+8 (China Standard)

Huichuan District (simplified Chinese: 汇川区; traditional Chinese: 匯川區; pinyin: Huìchuān Qū) is a district of the city of Zunyi, Guizhou, China. The Huichuan Sports Center is located in the district.

== Administrative divisions ==
Huichuan District is divided into 6 subdistricts and 8 towns:

subdistricts

- Shanghailu 上海路街道
- Ximalu 洗马路街道
- Dalianlu 大连路街道
- Gaoqiao 高桥街道
- Donggongsi 董公寺街道
- Gaoping 高坪街道

towns

- Tuanze 团泽镇
- Banqiao 板桥镇
- Sidu 泗渡镇
- Shawan 沙湾镇
- Shanpen 山盆镇
- Zhima 芝麻镇
- Songlin 松林镇
- Maoshi 毛石镇

== Climate ==
Climate data for Huichuan, elevation 984 m (3,228 ft), (1991–2020 normals)
Month	Jan	Feb	Mar	Apr	May	Jun	Jul	Aug	Sep	Oct	Nov	Dec	Year
Mean daily maximum °C (°F)	6.9 (44.4)	10.3 (50.5)	15.7 (60.3)	21.2 (70.2)	24.7 (76.5)	26.8 (80.2)	30.4 (86.7)	30.8 (87.4)	26.2 (79.2)	19.9 (67.8)	15.1 (59.2)	8.7 (47.7)	19.7 (67.5)
Daily mean °C (°F)	4.0 (39.2)	6.4 (43.5)	11.0 (51.8)	15.9 (60.6)	19.6 (67.3)	22.3 (72.1)	25.1 (77.2)	24.8 (76.6)	21.2 (70.2)	16.0 (60.8)	11.4 (52.5)	5.7 (42.3)	15.3 (59.5)
Mean daily minimum °C (°F)	2.1 (35.8)	4.0 (39.2)	8.1 (46.6)	12.5 (54.5)	16.2 (61.2)	19.2 (66.6)	21.4 (70.5)	20.9 (69.6)	18.0 (64.4)	13.7 (56.7)	9.1 (48.4)	3.8 (38.8)	12.4 (54.4)
Average precipitation mm (inches)	25.0 (0.98)	20.9 (0.82)	47.7 (1.88)	75.4 (2.97)	119.1 (4.69)	187.9 (7.40)	132.5 (5.22)	112.4 (4.43)	96.6 (3.80)	91.3 (3.59)	37.3 (1.47)	23.8 (0.94)	969.9 (38.19)
Average precipitation days	16.1	14.4	16.4	15.6	18.0	16.7	11.9	11.3	12.5	16.5	13.9	15.1	178.4
Average snowy days	5.4	2.4	0.5	0	0	0	0	0	0	0	0.1	1.5	9.9
Average relative humidity (%)	83	82	79	78	78	82	75	74	78	84	83	82	80
Mean monthly sunshine hours	34.2	43.9	74.3	98.0	109.3	97.3	179.6	195.6	122.5	73.4	62.5	39.1	1,129.7
Percentage possible sunshine	11	14	20	25	26	24	43	49	34	21	20	12	25
Source: China Meteorological Administration
