= Daozhen Gelao and Miao Autonomous County =

Daozhen County 道真县
- Autonomous county
- 道真仡佬族苗族自治县; Daozhen Gelao and Miao Autonomous County
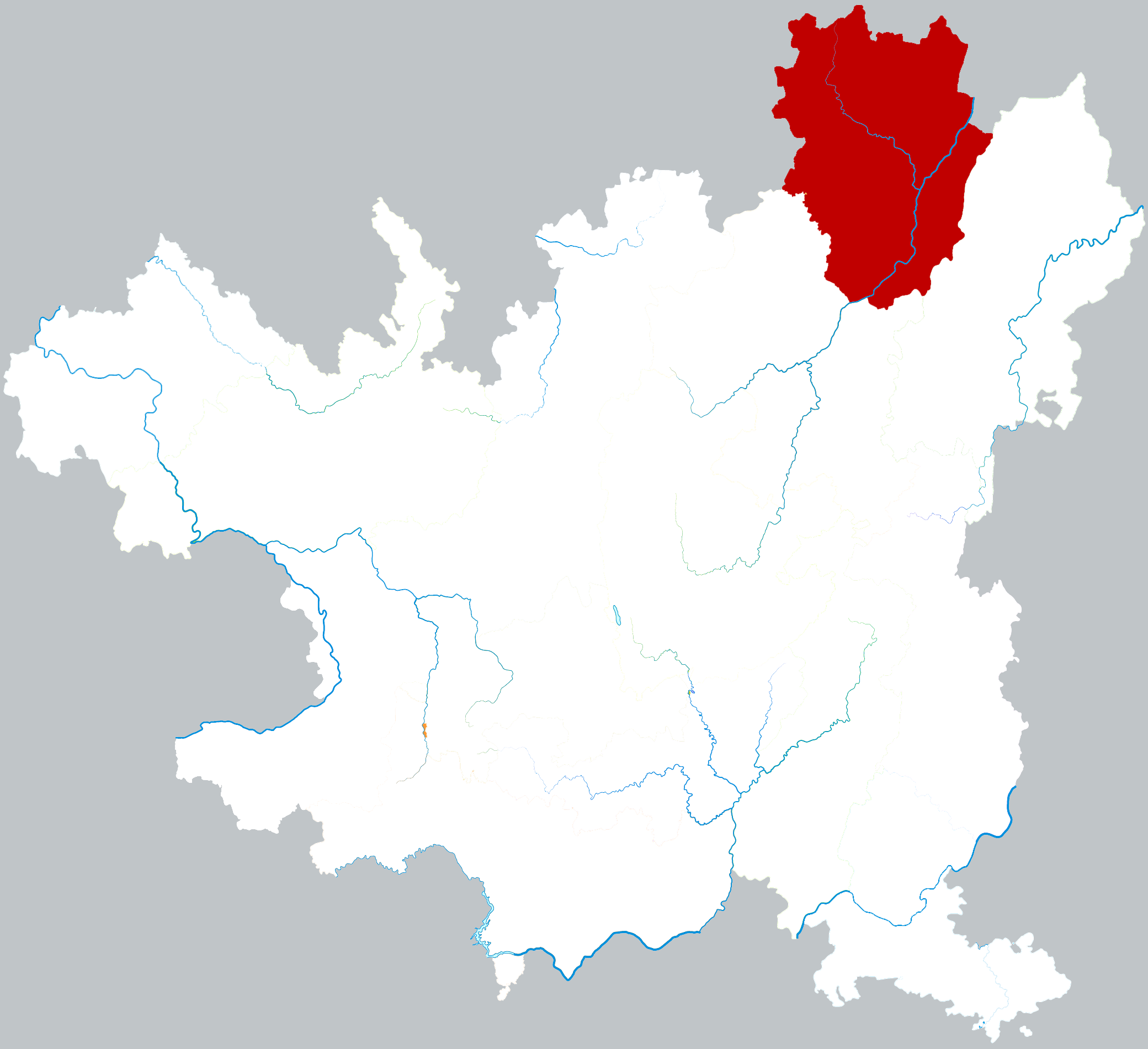
- Daozhen is the northernmost division in this map of Zunyi

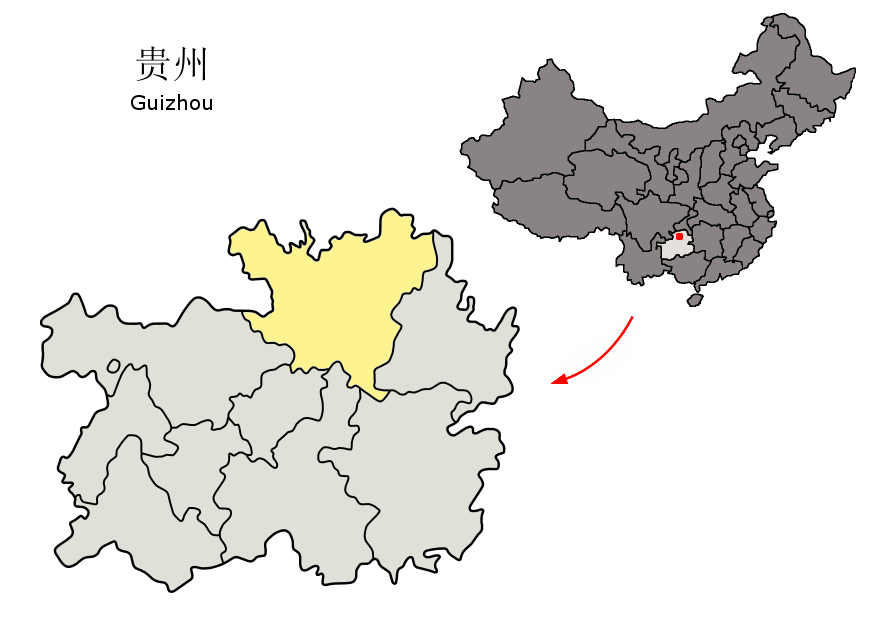
- Zunyi in Guizhou

- Location of the seat in Guizhou Daozhen (Southwest China)
- Coordinates (Daozhen County government): 28°51′45″N 107°36′47″E
- Country: China
- Province: Guizhou
- Prefecture-level city: Zunyi
- County seat: Yinzhen Subdistrict

Area
  - Total: 2,157.50 km^{2} (833.02 sq mi)

Population (2020 census)
  - Total: 243,846
  - Density: 113.022/km^{2} (292.727/sq mi)
- Time zone: UTC+08:00 (China Standard)
- Website: www.gzdaozhen.gov.cn

Daozhen Gelao and Miao Autonomous County (simplified Chinese: 道真仡佬族苗族自治县; traditional Chinese: 道真仡佬族苗族自治縣; pinyin: Dàozhēn Gēlǎozú Miáozú Zìzhìxiàn; usually referred to as "Daozhen County" (道真县; 道真縣), is a county in northernmost Guizhou province, China. It is under the administration of the prefecture-level city of Zunyi. Daozhen Gelao and Miao Autonomous County is surrounded by Chongqing on the north, Zheng'an County on the southwest, and Wuchuan Gelao and Miao Autonomous County on the southeast. The county covers 2,156 km^{2} (832 sq mi), as of 2018, it has a census registered population of 352,149. The county has one subdistrict, eleven towns, one ethnic township and two townships under its jurisdiction, the county seat is Yinzhen Subdistrict.

== Etymology ==
The name of "Yinzhen" is named after the courtesy name "Daozhen" (道真) of Yin Zhen (尹珍), a Confucian scholar who lived during the Eastern Han dynasty (25–220) and was one of "Three Sages of Han in Guizhou", the other two were She Ren (舍人) and Sheng Lan (盛览).

== History ==
After conquering all the states, Emperor Qin Shi Huang implemented the system of prefectures and counties in 221 BC. Daozhen Gelao and Miao Autonomous County came under the jurisdiction of Ba Commandery (巴郡).

In the Western Han dynasty (206 BC–8 AD), it belonged to Fuling County (涪陵县).

In 221, the county under the control of Shu Han (221–263).

After the Disaster of Yongjia in 311, local ethnic groups resisted full subjugation and the central government lost its jurisdiction.

In 564, Feng Zhou (奉州) was formed after the native ruler Tian Sihe (田思鹤) made agreements with the Northern Zhou Empire (557–581). Ten years later it was renamed "Qian Zhou" (黔州).

After China was reunified during the Sui dynasty (589–618), Xin'an County (信安县) was formed and under the administration of Mingyang Commandery (明阳郡).

Under the Tang dynasty (618–907), its name was replaced by "Xinning County" (信宁县) and under the administration of Yi Zhou (义州). It came under the jurisdiction of Qian Zhou (黔州) in 673, Zhen Zhou (珍州) in 642 and later Zhen Zhou (溱州) in 807. After the fall of Tang dynasty, the central government lost its jurisdiction again.

In 965, the native leader Tian Jingqian (田景迁) paid allegiance to the Emperor Taizong, who declared the new Qiande period of the Song dynasty (960–1279) five years ago. Its name was changed to Gao Zhou () in 968 and restored the former name "Zhen Zhou" (珍州) in 1108. In 1274, it was under jurisdiction of Bo Zhou (播州).

In 1363, Ming Yuzhen founded the Ming Xia in southwest China during the chaotic late Yuan dynasty (1271–1368), the name was changed to "Zhen Zhou" (真州).

In 1372, Yang Keng (杨铿), the top local official, paid allegiance to Hongwu Emperor, who set up the Ming dynasty (1368–1644) four years ago. It came under the jurisdiction of Sichuan Buzhengshisi (四川布政使司) and later Guizhou Buzhengshisi (贵州布政使司) in 1382. In 1600, local government known as "Bozhou Xuanweisi" (播州宣慰司) rose in rebellion against the central government. Wanli Emperor sent troops to pacify the rebellion. Zhen'an Zhou (真安州) was split from "Bozhou Xuanweisi" after the rebellion was suppressed.

In 1724, in the ruling of Yongzheng Emperor of the Qing dynasty (1644–1911), it was renamed "Zheng'an Zhou" (正安州).

In July 1914, Zheng'an Zhou was revoked and Daozhen County was set up.

On December 21, 1949, the Communists took over Daozhen County. It came under the jurisdiction of Zunyi Special District (遵义专区). In December 1958, Daozhen County was revoked and merged into Zheng'an County. Daozhen County was restored in August 1961. In November 1987 it became an autonomous county known as "Daozhen Gelao and Miao Autonomous County" approved by the State Council of China.

== Administrative division ==
Daozhen Gelao and Miao Autonomous County has one subdistrict, eleven towns, one ethnic township and two townships under its jurisdiction. The county seat is Yinzhen Subdistrict.

Name	Chinese character	Area (Km2)	Population (2015)	Notes
Yinzhen Subdistrict	尹珍街道			
Yuxi	玉溪镇	245.89	76,000	
Sanjiang	三江镇	74.95	15,000	
Longxing	隆兴镇	167.52	32,100	
Jiucheng	旧城镇	167	26,000	
Zhongxin	忠信镇	155.66	22,000	
Luolong	洛龙镇	226.36	20,000	
Yangxi	阳溪镇	185.4	13,000	
Sanqiao	三桥镇	229.2	30,000	
Daqian	大磏镇	192.8	25,000	
Pingmu	平模镇	90.6	20,000	
Hekou	河口镇	138.16	15,000	
Zongping Township	棕坪乡	77.12	14,000	
Taoyuan Township	桃源乡	106.15	10,000	
Shangba Tujia Ethnic Township	上坝土家族乡	99.67	18,000	

== Geography ==
Daozhen Gelao and Miao Autonomous County is located in northern Guizhou province. Daozhen Gelao and Miao Autonomous County shares a border with Chongqing on the north, Zheng'an County on the southwest, and Wuchuan Gelao and Miao Autonomous County on the southeast. The county has a combined area of 2,156-square-kilometre (832 sq mi), of which 2,111-square-kilometre (815 sq mi) is land and 45-square-kilometre (17 sq mi) is covered by water.

=== Climate ===
Daozhen Gelao and Miao Autonomous County is in the subtropical humid monsoon climate zone, with an average annual temperature of 16.9 °C (62.4 °F), total annual rainfall of 926.8-millimetre (36.49 in), a frost-free period of 270 days and annual average sunshine hours in 1059.9 hours.

Climate data for Daozhen, elevation 686 m (2,251 ft), (1991–2020 normals, extremes 1981–2010)
Month	Jan	Feb	Mar	Apr	May	Jun	Jul	Aug	Sep	Oct	Nov	Dec	Year
Record high °C (°F)	20.8 (69.4)	30.6 (87.1)	33.3 (91.9)	34.4 (93.9)	35.4 (95.7)	35.8 (96.4)	38.2 (100.8)	38.7 (101.7)	37.5 (99.5)	33.4 (92.1)	26.6 (79.9)	20.1 (68.2)	38.7 (101.7)
Mean daily maximum °C (°F)	8.4 (47.1)	11.1 (52.0)	16.0 (60.8)	21.6 (70.9)	25.2 (77.4)	27.9 (82.2)	31.3 (88.3)	31.4 (88.5)	26.9 (80.4)	20.7 (69.3)	16.0 (60.8)	10.3 (50.5)	20.6 (69.0)
Daily mean °C (°F)	5.4 (41.7)	7.5 (45.5)	11.5 (52.7)	16.5 (61.7)	20.2 (68.4)	23.3 (73.9)	26.2 (79.2)	25.8 (78.4)	21.9 (71.4)	16.7 (62.1)	12.0 (53.6)	7.0 (44.6)	16.2 (61.1)
Mean daily minimum °C (°F)	3.2 (37.8)	5.0 (41.0)	8.5 (47.3)	13.0 (55.4)	16.6 (61.9)	20.0 (68.0)	22.4 (72.3)	21.8 (71.2)	18.5 (65.3)	14.2 (57.6)	9.5 (49.1)	4.7 (40.5)	13.1 (55.6)
Record low °C (°F)	−4.3 (24.3)	−3.4 (25.9)	−3.9 (25.0)	3.9 (39.0)	8.5 (47.3)	13.1 (55.6)	15.0 (59.0)	14.9 (58.8)	10.6 (51.1)	4.0 (39.2)	−1.3 (29.7)	−5.0 (23.0)	−5.0 (23.0)
Average precipitation mm (inches)	16.5 (0.65)	21.9 (0.86)	46.7 (1.84)	105.2 (4.14)	158.8 (6.25)	192.5 (7.58)	147.8 (5.82)	126.2 (4.97)	97.7 (3.85)	96.1 (3.78)	45.6 (1.80)	15.3 (0.60)	1,070.3 (42.14)
Average precipitation days (≥ 0.1 mm)	10.7	10.4	13.4	15.1	17.2	16.4	13.3	12.4	11.5	16.1	11.9	10.7	159.1
Average snowy days	3.5	1.3	0.3	0	0	0	0	0	0	0	0	1.2	6.3
Average relative humidity (%)	79	77	76	78	79	80	77	76	79	83	82	80	79
Mean monthly sunshine hours	29.4	33.1	61.4	87.0	98.6	92.4	157.5	176.7	111.5	62.7	55.6	36.3	1,002.2
Percentage possible sunshine	9	10	16	22	23	22	37	44	30	18	17	11	22
Source: China Meteorological Administration

=== Rivers ===
There are 45 rivers and streams in the county. The major rivers are Furong River (芙蓉江), Mei River (梅江), Sanjiang River (三江), and Luolong River (洛龙河).

=== Mountains ===
There are more than 26 mountains over 1,000 metres (3,300 ft) above sea level in Daozhen Gelao and Miao Autonomous County. Mazhuayan (麻抓岩) is the highest point in the county, which, at 1,939.9 metres (6,365 ft) above sea level. The second highest point in the county is Mopanshi (磨盘石) which stands 1,934.1 metres (6,345 ft) above sea level.

== Natural resources ==
Daozhen Gelao and Miao Autonomous County is rich in natural resources. There are nearly 20 kinds of mineral resources, such as coal, oil shale, aluminium, iron, lead, zinc, silver, gypsum, calcite, etc. Coal reserves reached 116 million tons, making it became one of the "four coal fields in Zunyi".

=== Fauna ===
There are more than 400 species of terrestrial vertebrates in Daozhen Gelao and Miao Autonomous County. Among them, there are four kinds of national first-class protected wild animals, including françois' langur, musk deer, leopard, and clouded leopard, and more than 30 kinds of national second-class protected wild animals, such as macaque, Tibetan macaque, large Indian civet, pangolin and golden pheasant.

=== Flora ===
Daozhen Gelao and Miao Autonomous County has more than 100 species of wild plants of which 30 have state protection, such as Cathaya, Davidia involucrata, Ginkgo biloba, Taxus chinensis, Cunninghamia lanceolata, Cinnamomum camphora, etc.

== Demographics ==
=== Population ===
As of 2018, there were 352,149 people, including 234,678 rural population and 117,471 urban population.

=== Language ===
Mandarin is the official language.

=== Religion ===
The Gelao and Miao people believe in animism and worship ancestors. Buddhism and Taoism was introduced into Daozhen Gelao and Miao Autonomous County after the conquest of Song dynasty (960–1279).

== Tourism ==
Daozhen Gelao and Miao Autonomous County touts many attractions, including the Fairy Cave (仙女洞), Dashahe Provincial Nature Reserve (大沙河省级自然保护区) and Luolong National Ecological Park (洛龙国家生态公园).

== Notable people ==
- Liu Jiahua (刘家华), politician.
- Xiong Xianyu (熊先煜), PLA military officer.
