= Zheng'an County =

Zheng'an County 正安县
- County
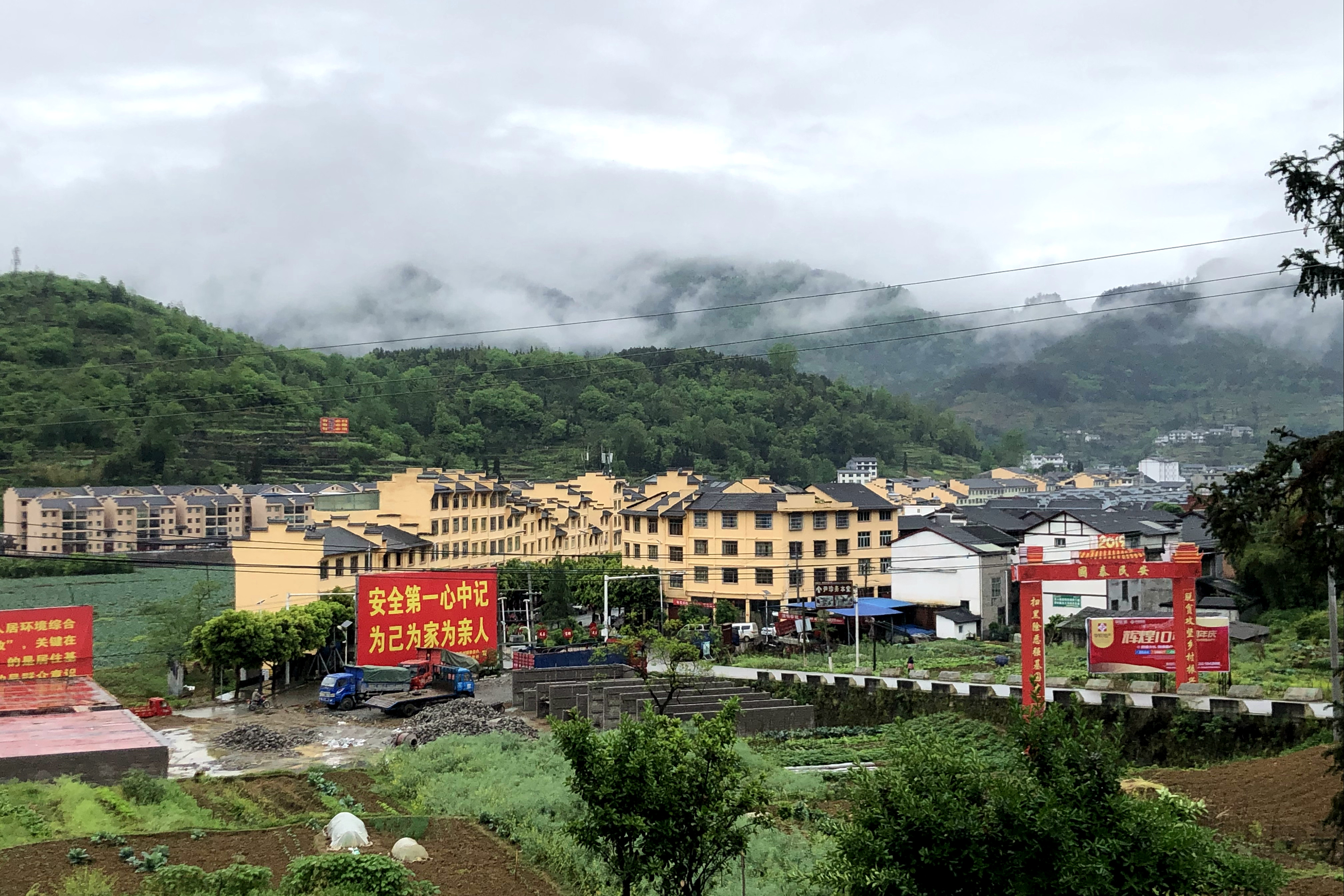
- Xinzhou Town, Zheng'an County

- Location of the seat in Guizhou Zheng'an (Southwest China)
- Coordinates (Zheng'an County government): 28°33′13″N 107°27′16″E
- Country: China
- Province: Guizhou
- Prefecture-level city: Zunyi
- County seat: Fengyi Subdistrict

Area
  - Total: 2,595.24 km^{2} (1,002.03 sq mi)

Population (2010)
  - Total: 389,434
  - Density: 150.057/km^{2} (388.646/sq mi)
- Time zone: UTC+8 (China Standard)

Zheng'an County (Chinese: 正安县; pinyin: Zhèng'ān Xiàn) is a county in the north of Guizhou province, China, bordering Chongqing to the north. It is under the administration of the prefecture-level city of Zunyi.

== Administrative divisions ==
Zheng'an County is divided into 2 subdistricts, 16 towns and 2 ethnic townships:

subdistricts

- Fengyi Subdistrict 凤仪街道
- Ruihao Subdistrict 瑞濠街道

towns

- Ruixi Town 瑞溪镇
- Hexi Town 和溪镇
- Anchang Town 安场镇
- Tuping Town 土坪镇
- Liudu Town 流渡镇
- Gelin Town 格林镇
- Xinzhou Town 新州镇
- Miaotang Town 庙塘镇
- Xiaoya Town 小雅镇
- Zhongguan Town 中观镇
- Furongjiang Town 芙蓉江镇
- Banzhu Town 班竹镇
- Bifeng Town 碧峰镇
- Lejian Town 乐俭镇
- Yangxing Town 杨兴镇
- Fuhen Town 桴㯊镇

ethnic townships

- Xieba Gelao and Miao Ethnic Township 谢坝仡佬族苗族乡
- Shiping Miao and Gelao Ethnic Township 市坪苗族仡佬族乡

== Climate ==
Climate data for Zheng'an, elevation 680 m (2,230 ft), (1991–2020 normals, extremes 1981–2010)
Month	Jan	Feb	Mar	Apr	May	Jun	Jul	Aug	Sep	Oct	Nov	Dec	Year
Record high °C (°F)	22.2 (72.0)	30.9 (87.6)	33.3 (91.9)	33.5 (92.3)	36.6 (97.9)	36.0 (96.8)	37.9 (100.2)	38.9 (102.0)	37.3 (99.1)	33.2 (91.8)	27.6 (81.7)	19.5 (67.1)	38.9 (102.0)
Mean daily maximum °C (°F)	8.3 (46.9)	11.1 (52.0)	16.0 (60.8)	21.4 (70.5)	25.1 (77.2)	27.8 (82.0)	31.1 (88.0)	31.1 (88.0)	27.0 (80.6)	20.8 (69.4)	15.9 (60.6)	10.1 (50.2)	20.5 (68.9)
Daily mean °C (°F)	5.4 (41.7)	7.8 (46.0)	11.8 (53.2)	16.7 (62.1)	20.4 (68.7)	23.4 (74.1)	26.3 (79.3)	25.9 (78.6)	22.4 (72.3)	17.1 (62.8)	12.4 (54.3)	7.2 (45.0)	16.4 (61.5)
Mean daily minimum °C (°F)	3.4 (38.1)	5.5 (41.9)	8.8 (47.8)	13.4 (56.1)	17 (63)	20.3 (68.5)	22.8 (73.0)	22.1 (71.8)	19.0 (66.2)	14.5 (58.1)	10.0 (50.0)	5.1 (41.2)	13.5 (56.3)
Record low °C (°F)	−3.6 (25.5)	−2.6 (27.3)	−1.5 (29.3)	3.9 (39.0)	9.6 (49.3)	13.4 (56.1)	15.7 (60.3)	16.9 (62.4)	11.7 (53.1)	5.5 (41.9)	−0.4 (31.3)	−3.3 (26.1)	−3.6 (25.5)
Average precipitation mm (inches)	17.4 (0.69)	20.0 (0.79)	44.9 (1.77)	99.5 (3.92)	157.0 (6.18)	194.7 (7.67)	152.2 (5.99)	128.0 (5.04)	87.6 (3.45)	99.1 (3.90)	47.2 (1.86)	16.9 (0.67)	1,064.5 (41.93)
Average precipitation days (≥ 0.1 mm)	11.8	11.2	14.4	16.3	17.6	16.6	12.9	13.2	11.6	16.5	12.7	11.2	166
Average snowy days	4.4	2.2	0.3	0	0	0	0	0	0	0	0	1.3	8.2
Average relative humidity (%)	78	75	75	77	77	80	75	74	76	82	81	80	78
Mean monthly sunshine hours	25.8	31.3	59.6	81.4	93.6	91.7	159.3	166.5	111.5	60.9	48.2	31.2	961
Percentage possible sunshine	8	10	16	21	22	22	38	41	30	17	15	10	21
Source: China Meteorological Administration
