= Honghuagang, Zunyi =

Honghuagang 红花岗区
- District
- Location in Guizhou Honghuagang (Southwest China)
- Coordinates (Honghuagang District government): 27°38′41″N 106°53′37″E
- Country: China
- Province: Guizhou
- Prefecture-level city: Zunyi
- District seat: Zhongzhuang Subdistrict

Area
  - Total: 705.49 km^{2} (272.39 sq mi)

Population (2020 census)
  - Total: 971,337
  - Density: 1,376.8/km^{2} (3,566.0/sq mi)
- Time zone: UTC+8 (China Standard)
- Website: www.zyhhg.gov.cn

Honghuagang District (simplified Chinese: 红花岗区; traditional Chinese: 紅花崗區; pinyin: Hónghuāgǎng Qū) is a district of the city of Zunyi, Guizhou province, China. It is under the administration of Zunyi city. Its population as of 2002 was 470,000.

== Administrative divisions ==
Honghuagang District is divided into 14 subdistricts and 9 towns:

- Laocheng Subdistrict (老城街道)
- Wanlilu Subdistrict (万里路街道)
- Zhonghualu Subdistrict (中华路街道)
- Nanmenguan Subdistrict (南门关街道)
- Yan'anlu Subdistrict (延安路街道)
- Zhoushuiqiao Subdistrict (舟水桥街道)
- Zhongshanlu Subdistrict (中山路街道)
- Beijinglu Subdistrict (北京路街道)
- Changzheng Subdistrict (长征街道)
- Liyi Subdistrict (礼仪街道)
- Nanguan Subdistrict (南关街道)
- Zhongzhuang Subdistrict (忠庄街道)
- Xinpu Subdistrict (新蒲街道)
- Xinzhong Subdistrict (新中街道)
- Xiangkou Town (巷口镇)
- Hailong Town (海龙镇)
- Shenxi Town (深溪镇)
- Jindingshan Town (金鼎山镇)
- Xinzhou Town (新舟镇)
- Xiazi Town (虾子镇)
- Sandu Town (三渡镇)
- Yongle Town (永乐镇)
- Laba Town (喇叭镇)
