= Bozhou, Zunyi =

Bozhou 播州区
- District
- Location of the district seat in Guizhou Bozhou (Southwest China)
- Coordinates (Bozhou District government): 27°32′11″N 106°49′47″E
- Country: China
- Province: Guizhou
- Prefecture-level city: Zunyi
- District seat: Nanbai

Area
  - Total: 1,513 km^{2} (584 sq mi)

Population (2020)
  - Total: 761,491
  - Density: 503.3/km^{2} (1,304/sq mi)
- Time zone: UTC+8 (China Standard)

Bozhou District (Chinese: 播州区; pinyin: Bōzhōu Qū), formerly Zunyi County, is a district of the city of Zunyi, Guizhou, China.

== Administrative divisions ==
Bozhou District is divided into 5 subdistricts, 17 towns and 2 ethnic townships:

subdistricts

- Nanbai Subdistrict 南白街道
- Bonan Subdistrict 播南街道
- Yingshanhu Subdistrict 影山湖街道
- Guihuaqiao Subdistrict 桂花桥街道
- Longkeng Subdistrict 龙坑街道

towns

- Sancha Town 三岔镇
- Goujiang Town 苟江镇
- Sanhe Town 三合镇
- Wujiang Town 乌江镇
- Longping Town 龙坪镇
- Tuanxi Town 团溪镇
- Tiechang Town 铁厂镇
- Xiping Town 西坪镇
- Shangji Town 尚嵇镇
- Maoli Town 茅栗镇
- Xinmin Town 新民镇
- Yaxi Town 鸭溪镇
- Shiban Town 石板镇
- Leshan Town 乐山镇
- Fengxiang Town 枫香镇
- Panshui Town 泮水镇
- Mati Town 马蹄镇

ethnic townships

- Pingzheng Gelao Ethnic Township 平正仡佬族乡
- Hongguan Miao Ethnic Township 洪关苗族乡

== Climate ==
Climate data for Bozhou, elevation 974 m (3,196 ft), (1991–2020 normals)
Month	Jan	Feb	Mar	Apr	May	Jun	Jul	Aug	Sep	Oct	Nov	Dec	Year
Mean daily maximum °C (°F)	6.7 (44.1)	9.9 (49.8)	14.8 (58.6)	20.4 (68.7)	24.0 (75.2)	26.2 (79.2)	29.2 (84.6)	29.4 (84.9)	25.5 (77.9)	19.3 (66.7)	14.8 (58.6)	8.9 (48.0)	19.1 (66.4)
Daily mean °C (°F)	4.1 (39.4)	6.4 (43.5)	10.6 (51.1)	15.8 (60.4)	19.5 (67.1)	22.2 (72.0)	24.8 (76.6)	24.5 (76.1)	21.0 (69.8)	15.8 (60.4)	11.3 (52.3)	6.0 (42.8)	15.2 (59.3)
Mean daily minimum °C (°F)	2.2 (36.0)	4.1 (39.4)	7.8 (46.0)	12.6 (54.7)	16.2 (61.2)	19.3 (66.7)	21.4 (70.5)	20.9 (69.6)	17.8 (64.0)	13.5 (56.3)	8.9 (48.0)	3.9 (39.0)	12.4 (54.3)
Average precipitation mm (inches)	29.8 (1.17)	25.8 (1.02)	42.1 (1.66)	76.9 (3.03)	139.9 (5.51)	182.4 (7.18)	166.0 (6.54)	107.0 (4.21)	93.3 (3.67)	96.0 (3.78)	39.3 (1.55)	25.2 (0.99)	1,023.7 (40.31)
Average precipitation days	16.4	14.8	17.4	16.2	18.0	17.5	12.9	11.4	12.3	16.8	13.4	14.5	181.6
Average snowy days	5.9	2.9	0.5	0	0	0	0	0	0	0	0.1	2.0	11.4
Average relative humidity (%)	84	81	80	78	78	81	77	75	77	83	82	82	80
Mean monthly sunshine hours	28.7	40.2	66.4	90.5	105.6	94.7	171.6	175.1	118.5	66.1	63.5	40.3	1,061.2
Percentage possible sunshine	9	13	18	23	25	23	41	44	32	19	20	13	23
Source: China Meteorological Administration

== Education ==
Secondary schools in Bozhou District include:

- Zunyi City Bozhou District New People's Secondary School (遵义市播州区新民中学)
- Zunyi City Bozhou District Baizhen Houba Secondary School (遵义市播州区南白镇后坝中学)
- Zunyi City No. 53 Secondary School (遵义市第五十三中学)
- Zunyi City Bozhou District Hongguan Miao Township Heyan School (遵义市播州区洪关苗族乡河堰学校)
- Zunyi City Bozhou District Shangji Secondary School (遵义市播州区尚嵇中学)
- Zunyi City Bozhou District Yaxi Secondary School (遵义市播州区鸭溪中学)
- Zunyi City Bozhou District Nanfeng School (遵义市播州区南锋学校)
- Zunyi City Nanbai Secondary School (遵义市南白中学)
- Zunyi City Bozhou District Tuanxi Secondary School (遵义市播州区团溪中学)
- Zunyi City No. 21 Secondary School (遵义市第二十一中学)
- Zunyi City No. 22 Secondary School (遵义市第二十二中学)
- Zunyi city No. 23 Secondary School (遵义市第二十三中学)
