= Zunyi =

Zunyi 遵义市 Tsunyi, Tsun-i
- Prefecture-level city
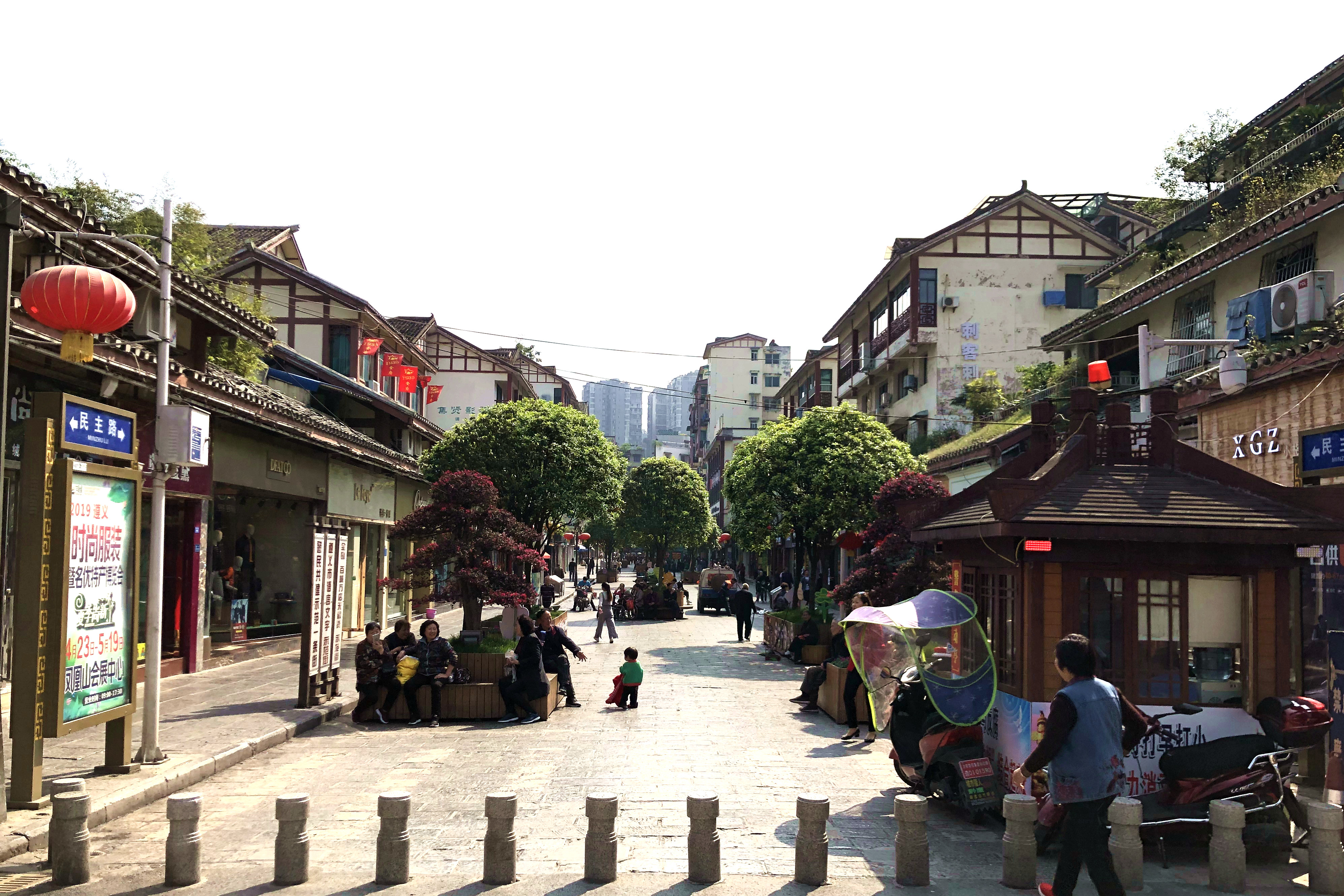
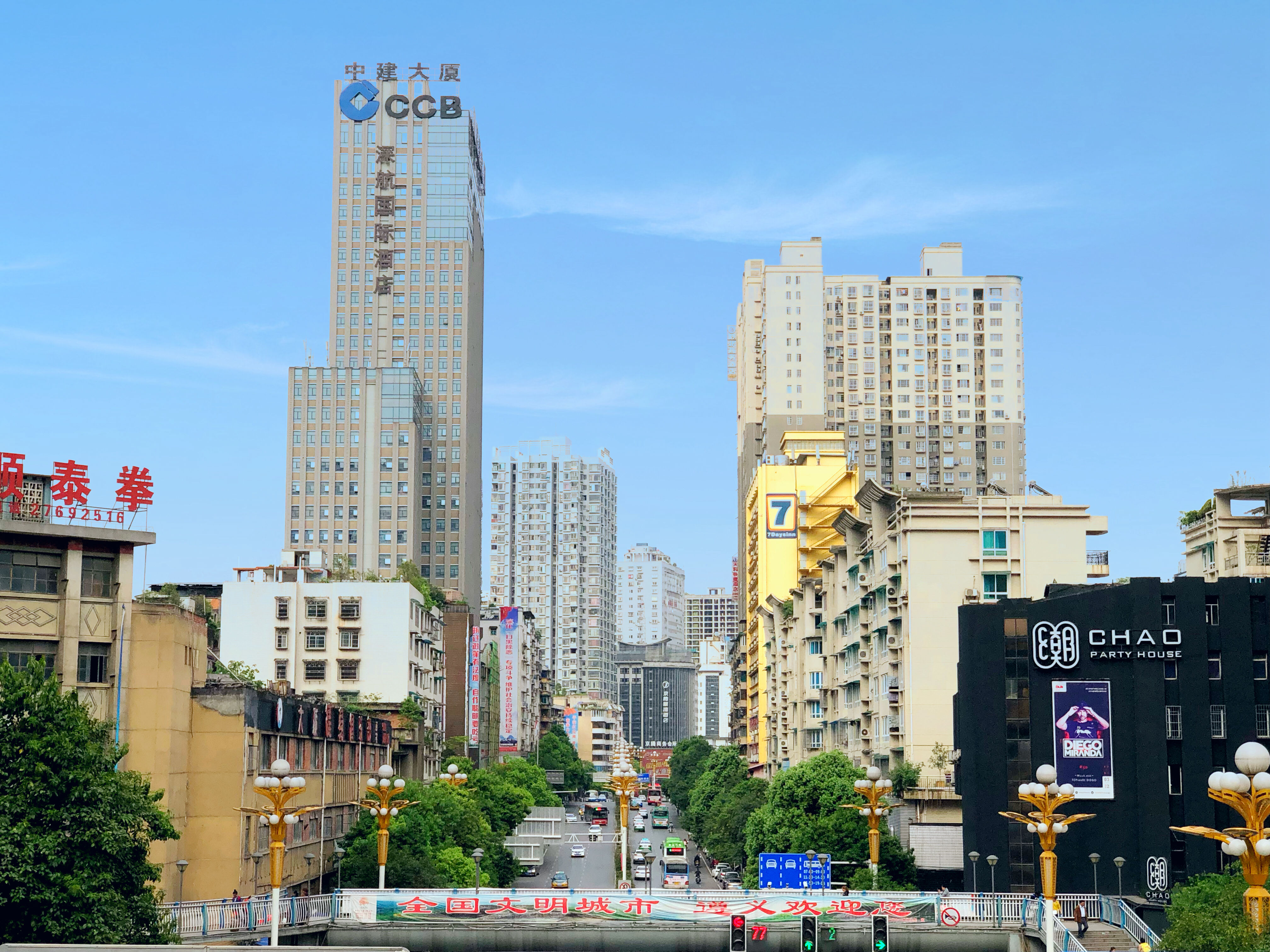
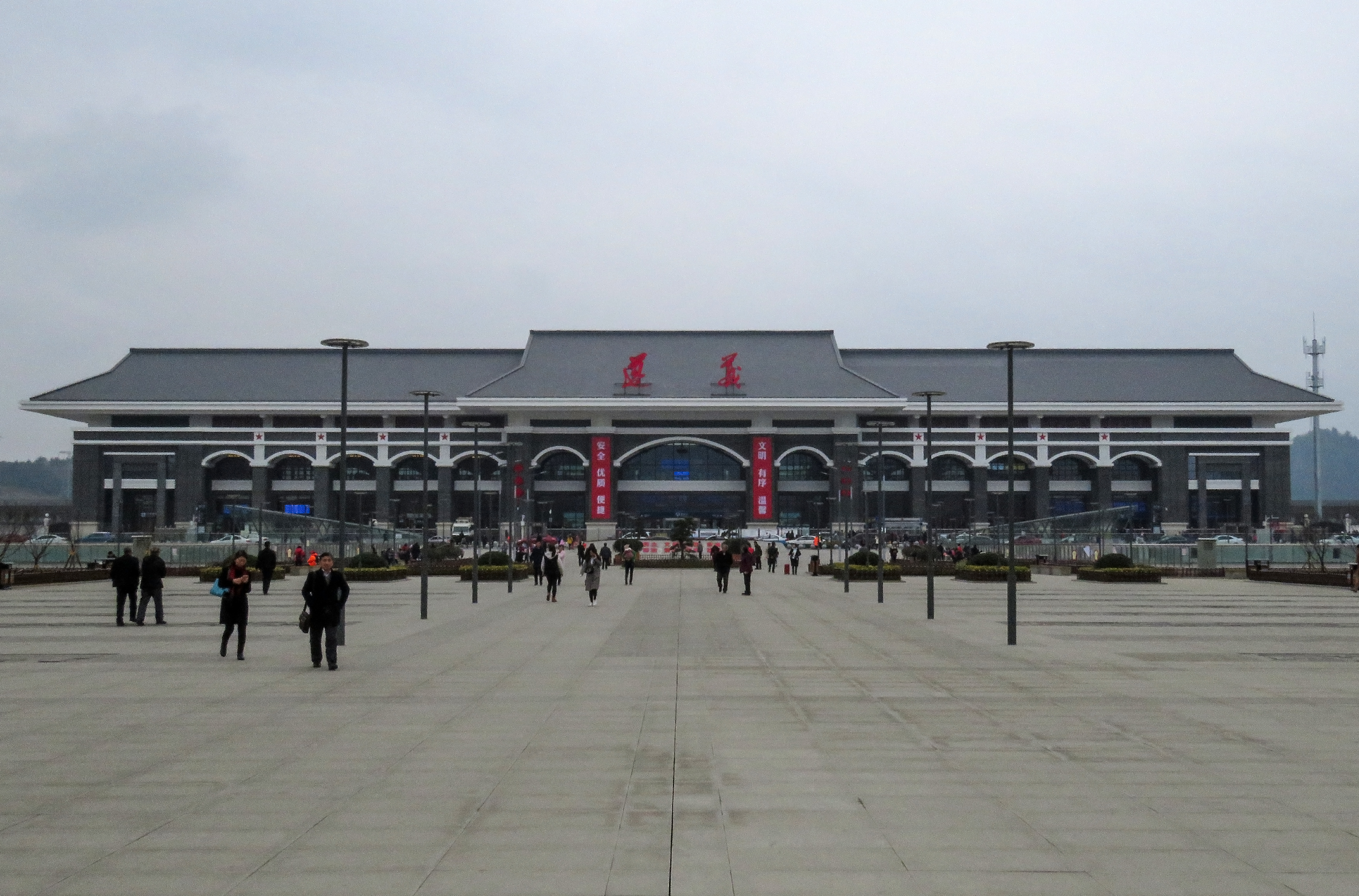
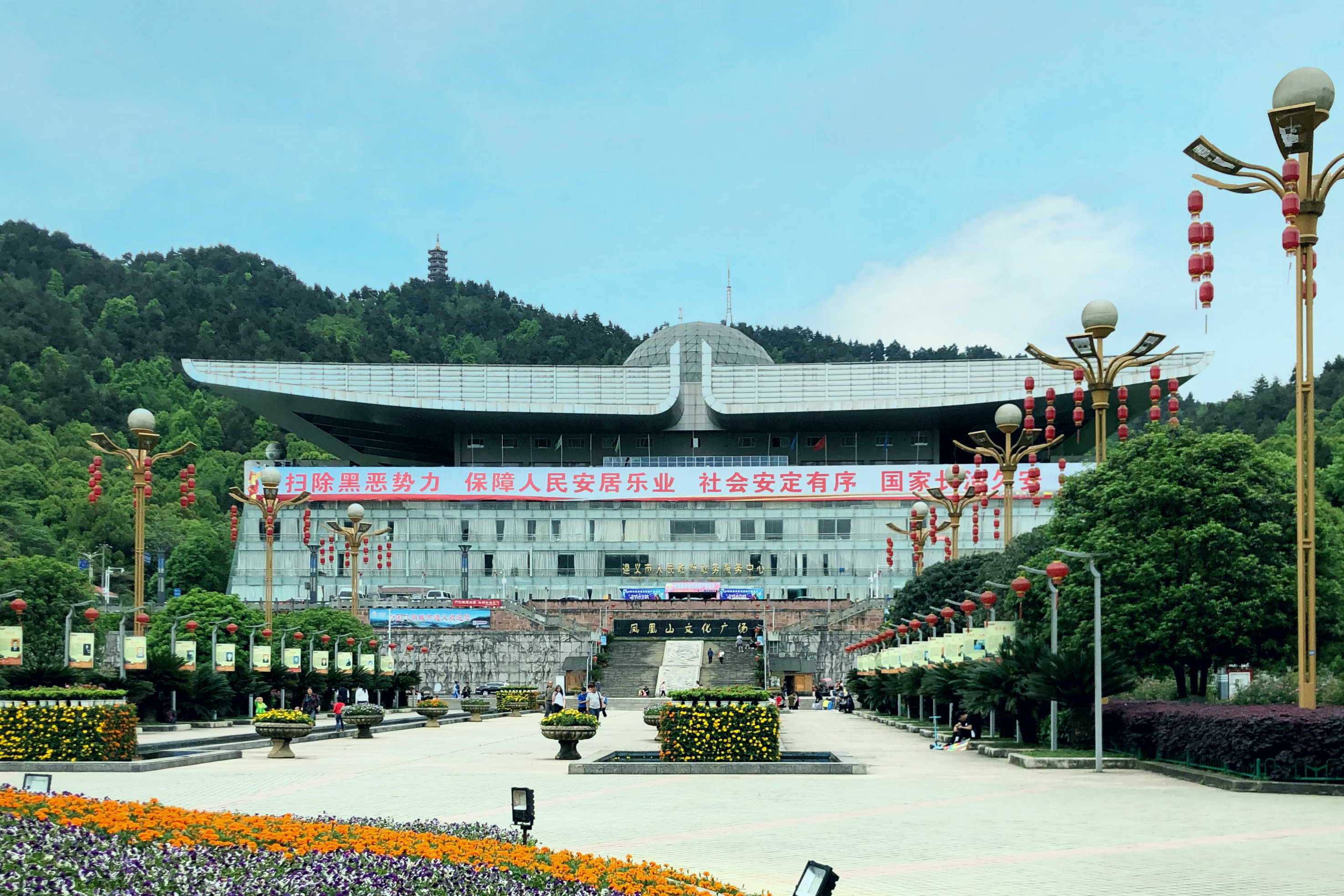
- From top, left to right: Minzhu Road, Beijing Road, Zunyi Station, Fenghuangshan Square

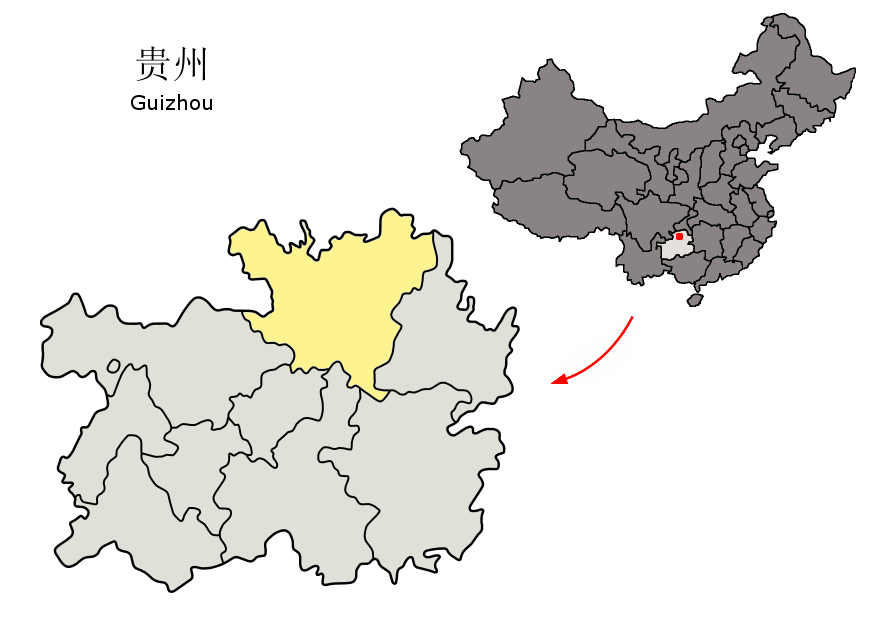
- Location of Zunyi City jurisdiction in Guizhou

- Location of the city center in Guizhou Zunyi (Southwest China) Zunyi (China)
- Coordinates (Huichuan Sports Park (汇川体育公园)): 27°42′48″N 106°55′12″E
- Country: People's Republic of China
- Province: Guizhou
- Municipal seat: Honghuagang District

Government
  - Party Secretary: Wei Shuwang
  - Mayor: Huang Wei

Area
  - Prefecture-level city: 30,763 km^{2} (11,878 sq mi)
  - Urban: 1,304 km^{2} (503 sq mi)
  - Metro: 1,304 km^{2} (503 sq mi)
- Elevation: 865 m (2,838 ft)

Population (2020 census)
  - Prefecture-level city: 6,606,675
  - Density: 214.76/km^{2} (556.23/sq mi)
  - Urban: 2,360,549
  - Urban density: 1,810/km^{2} (4,688/sq mi)
  - Metro: 2,360,549
  - Metro density: 1,810/km^{2} (4,688/sq mi)

GDP
  - Prefecture-level city: CN¥ 372 billion US$ 53.9 billion
  - Per capita: CN¥ 56,334; US$ 8,167
- Time zone: UTC+8 (China Standard)
- Postal code: 563000
- Area code: 0851
- ISO 3166 code: CN-GZ-03
- Licence plate prefixes: 贵C
- Website: www.zunyi.gov.cn

Zunyi (simplified Chinese: 遵义; traditional Chinese: 遵義; pinyin: Zūnyì) is a prefecture-level city in northern Guizhou province, People's Republic of China, situated between the provincial capital Guiyang to the south and Chongqing to the north, also bordering Sichuan to the northwest. Along with Guiyang and Liupanshui, it is one of the most important cities of the province. The metro area is made of three urban districts of the city, Huichuan, Honghuagang, and Bozhou, which had a population of 2,360,549 people. The whole prefecture, including 14 county-level administrative areas, had a population of 6,606,675 at the 2020 census.

Zunyi is known for being the location of the Zunyi Conference in 1935, where Mao Zedong was first elected to the leadership of the Chinese Communist Party during the Long March.

== History ==
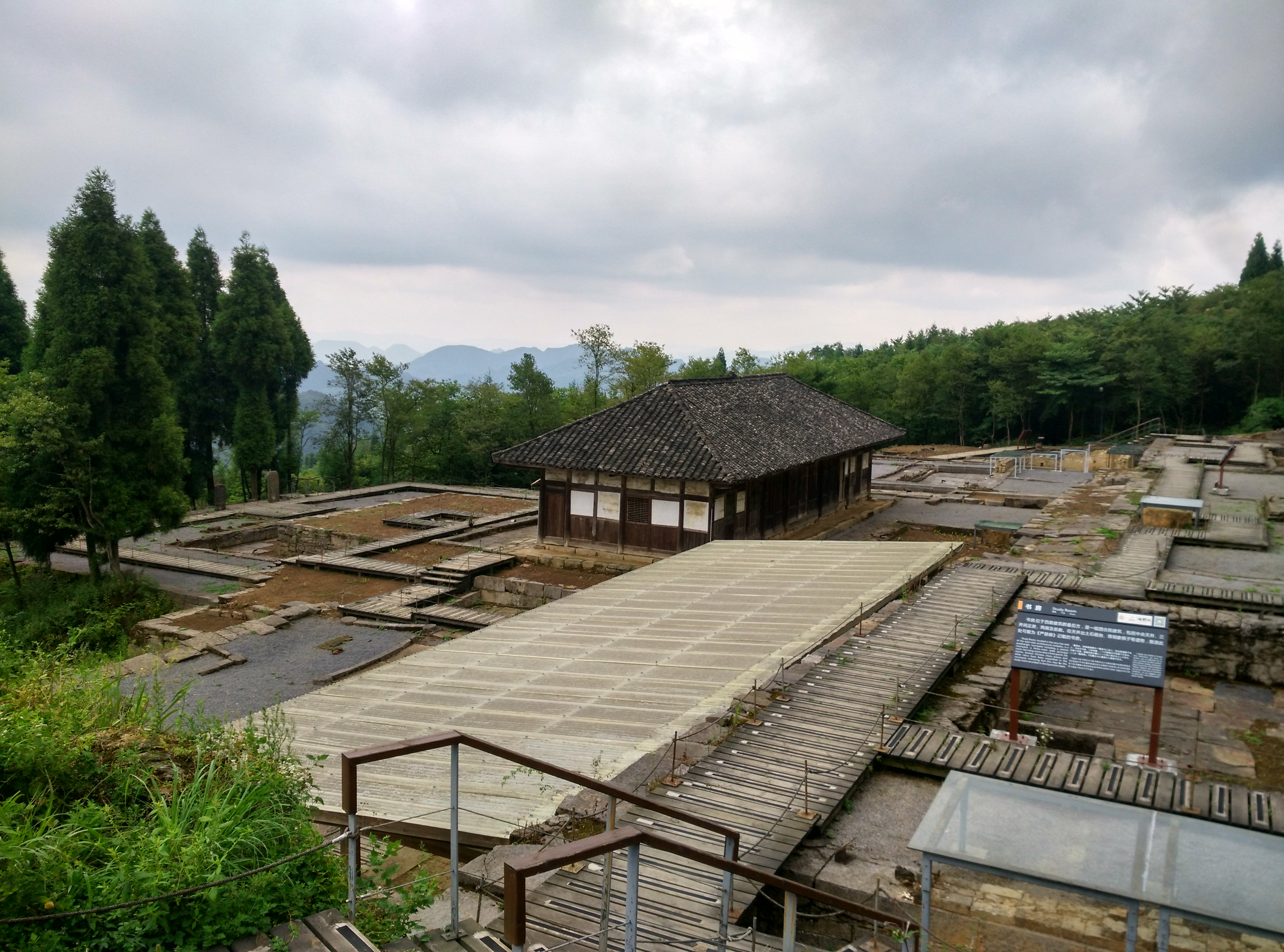
The World Heritage Site of Hailongtun fortress, the last rebel holdout during the Bozhou Rebellion in 1600.

The area of Zunyi was originally inhabited by the Tongzi people during the Paleolithic. Later, its territory was a part of several kingdoms. Zunyi was considered to be the center of the Yelang kingdom. The region around Zunyi first came under Chinese rule during Han dynasty, during the reign of Emperor Wu of Han. After the Han dynasty collapsed, the area remained under nominal Chinese control, but much of the administration was left to local, non-Han chiefs. In the 7th century CE, the area came under regular Chinese administration during the Tang dynasty, Zunyi was placed under the new Bo Prefecture (Bozhou).

Towards the end of the Tang, Bozhou was conquered by the Nanzhao Kingdom. However, it soon gained independence as the Chiefdom of Bozhou in AD 876. The chiefdom became an autonomous prefecture of the Song and subsequent dynasties, while the ruling Yang family held power in Zunyi for more than seven centuries. Bozhou rebelled against the Ming dynasty in 1589, resisting the Ming for more than a decade before its eventual destruction in 1600. Subsequently, Zunyi Prefecture was established, with the present-day city of Zunyi becoming the prefectural seat. Zunyi retained its status as a prefectural seat through the Qing dynasty. After the Xinhai Revolution, Zunyi was redesignated as a county in 1914.

In 1935, the Zunyi Conference took place in the city during the Long March and elevated Mao Zedong to a dominant position within the Chinese Communist Party.

During the country's First Five-Year Plan, Zunyi was redesignated as a city, and experienced considerable growth and transformation.

== Geography ==
Zunyi is located in northern Guizhou at an elevation of 865 m (2,838 ft); it is situated in the transition from the Yunnan–Guizhou Plateau to the Sichuan Basin and hill country of Hunan.

=== Climate ===
Zunyi has a four-season, monsoon-influenced humid subtropical climate (Köppen Cfa), slightly modified by elevation. It has fairly mild winters and hot, humid summers; close to 60% of the year's 1,022 mm (40 in) of precipitation occurs from May to August. The monthly 24-hour average temperature ranges from 4.7 °C (40.5 °F) in January to 25.4 °C (77.7 °F) in July, while the annual mean is 15.8 °C (60.4 °F). Rain is common throughout the year, with 176 days annually precipitation, though it does not actually accumulate to much in winter, the cloudiest time of year; summer, in contrast, is the sunniest. With monthly percent possible sunshine ranging from around 9% in January and February to 42% in August, the city receives only 1,028 hours of bright sunshine annually; only a few locations in neighbouring Sichuan receive less sunshine on average.

Climate data for Zunyi, elevation 844 m (2,769 ft), (1991–2020 normals, extremes 1951–2020)
Month	Jan	Feb	Mar	Apr	May	Jun	Jul	Aug	Sep	Oct	Nov	Dec	Year
Record high °C (°F)	26.4 (79.5)	31.6 (88.9)	33.0 (91.4)	37.6 (99.7)	37.2 (99.0)	35.1 (95.2)	37.6 (99.7)	38.7 (101.7)	37.5 (99.5)	33.2 (91.8)	28.0 (82.4)	24.7 (76.5)	38.7 (101.7)
Mean daily maximum °C (°F)	7.5 (45.5)	10.6 (51.1)	15.5 (59.9)	21.1 (70.0)	24.8 (76.6)	27.1 (80.8)	30.1 (86.2)	30.3 (86.5)	26.7 (80.1)	20.2 (68.4)	15.7 (60.3)	9.9 (49.8)	20.0 (67.9)
Daily mean °C (°F)	4.7 (40.5)	7.1 (44.8)	11.1 (52.0)	16.3 (61.3)	20.0 (68.0)	22.9 (73.2)	25.4 (77.7)	25.1 (77.2)	21.8 (71.2)	16.5 (61.7)	12.0 (53.6)	6.8 (44.2)	15.8 (60.5)
Mean daily minimum °C (°F)	2.8 (37.0)	4.9 (40.8)	8.2 (46.8)	13.0 (55.4)	16.6 (61.9)	19.8 (67.6)	22.0 (71.6)	21.4 (70.5)	18.4 (65.1)	14.1 (57.4)	9.6 (49.3)	4.7 (40.5)	13.0 (55.3)
Record low °C (°F)	−7.1 (19.2)	−5.4 (22.3)	−3.2 (26.2)	1.6 (34.9)	7.2 (45.0)	10.9 (51.6)	13.7 (56.7)	14.7 (58.5)	9.4 (48.9)	3.8 (38.8)	−1.2 (29.8)	−5.5 (22.1)	−7.1 (19.2)
Average precipitation mm (inches)	24.8 (0.98)	22.6 (0.89)	39.0 (1.54)	78.0 (3.07)	132.5 (5.22)	204.1 (8.04)	168.4 (6.63)	109.1 (4.30)	77.3 (3.04)	100.4 (3.95)	41.1 (1.62)	24.7 (0.97)	1,022 (40.25)
Average precipitation days (≥ 0.1 mm)	15.3	14.0	16.3	16.6	18.3	16.9	12.8	10.9	12.0	16.5	12.5	13.4	175.5
Average snowy days	5.9	2.5	0.4	0	0	0	0	0	0	0	0	1.7	10.5
Average relative humidity (%)	80	78	77	76	76	79	75	73	74	80	80	79	77
Mean monthly sunshine hours	28.8	36.5	64.8	88.6	104.1	93.6	155.6	170.1	122.9	66.0	59.0	37.9	1,027.9
Percentage possible sunshine	9	12	17	23	25	23	37	42	34	19	18	12	23
Source: China Meteorological Administration extremes

== Administration ==
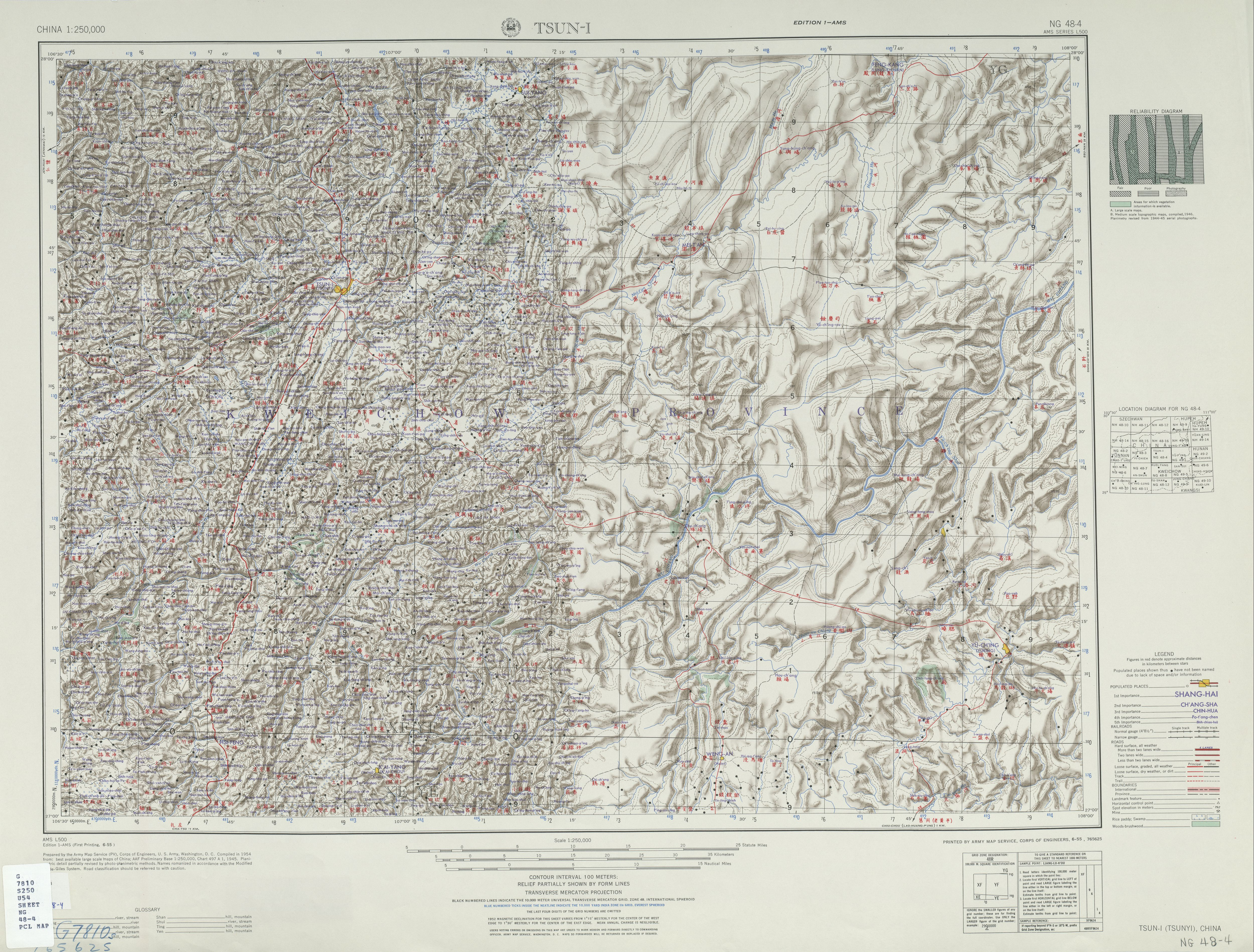
Map including Zunyi (labeled as TSUN-I (TSUNYI) (walled) 遵義) (AMS, 1954)

Administrative Map of Zunyi City
Name	Hanzi	Hanyu Pinyin	Area (square kilometers)	Administrative Seat	Postal Code
Zunyi City	遵义市	Zūnyì Shì	30780.73	Huichuan District	563000
Honghuagang District	红花岗区	Hónghuāgǎng Qū	705.49	Zhongzhuang Subdistrict	563000
Huichuan District	汇川区	Huìchuān Qū	611.23	Dalianlu Subdistrict	563000
Bozhou District	播州区	Bōzhōu Qū	4092.00	Nanbai Subdistrict	563100
Tongzi County	桐梓县	Tóngzǐ Xiàn	3193.54	Loushanguan	563200
Suiyang County	绥阳县	Suīyáng Xiàn	2544.52	Yangchuan	563300
Zheng'an County	正安县	Zhèng'ān Xiàn	2595.24	Fengyi	563400
Daozhen County	道真仡佬族 苗族自治县	Dàozhēn Gēlǎozú; Miáozú Zìzhìxiàn	2157.50	Yuxi	563500
Wuchuan County	务川仡佬族 苗族自治县	Wùchuān Gēlǎozú; Miáozú Zìzhìxiàn	2777.59	Duru	564300
Fenggang County	凤冈县	Fènggāng Xiàn	1885.43	Longquan	564200
Meitan County	湄潭县	Méitán Xiàn	1859.13	Meijiang	564100
Yuqing County	余庆县	Yúqìng Xiàn	1623.67	Baini	564400
Xishui County	习水县	Xíshuǐ Xiàn	3063.28	Donghuang	564600
Chishui City	赤水市	Chìshuǐ Shì	1882.57	Shizhong Subdistrict	564700
Renhuai City	仁怀市	Rénhuái Shì	1789.53	Yanjin Subdistrict	564500
Note: Honghuagang figures contain the San Po New Area under the jurisdiction of the town.

== Ethnic groups ==
The 1999 Zunyi Prefecture Almanac lists the following ethnic groups.

- Gelao
- Miao
  - m̥uŋ˥˧ sa˥ ("Blue-Skirted Miao"): most populous, found in western Zunyi Prefecture
  - m̥uŋ˥˧ la˥˧ ("Red-Skirted Miao"): central Zunyi Prefecture
  - m̥uŋ˥˧ tleu˥˧ ("White-Skirted Miao"): least populous, found in central Zunyi Prefecture
  - m̥uɑ˥˧ ʂuɑ˥ ("Chinese Miao"; clothing similar to that of the m̥uŋ˥˧ tleu˥˧): northwestern Zunyi Prefecture
- Tujia
- Buyi
- Yi
- Dong
- Hui
- Manchu

== Transportation ==
- China National Highway 210
- China National Highway 306
- Chongqing–Guiyang high-speed railway
- G4215 Rongzun Expressway
- G56 Hangzhou–Ruili Expressway
- G75 Lanzhou-Haikou Expressway
- Shizi Bridge
- Sichuan–Guizhou Railway
- Zunyi Xinzhou Airport

A rapid transit system is in the planning stages for Zunyi.

== Economy ==
Zunyi is the economic and commercial hub of the North Guizhou Province. In 2019, Zunyi's GDP was CN¥348.3 billion (US$53 billion).

== Culture ==
Being known as the "home of culture" of Guizhou province, Zunyi, or the North-Guizhou area, is the education and economic centre of the province.

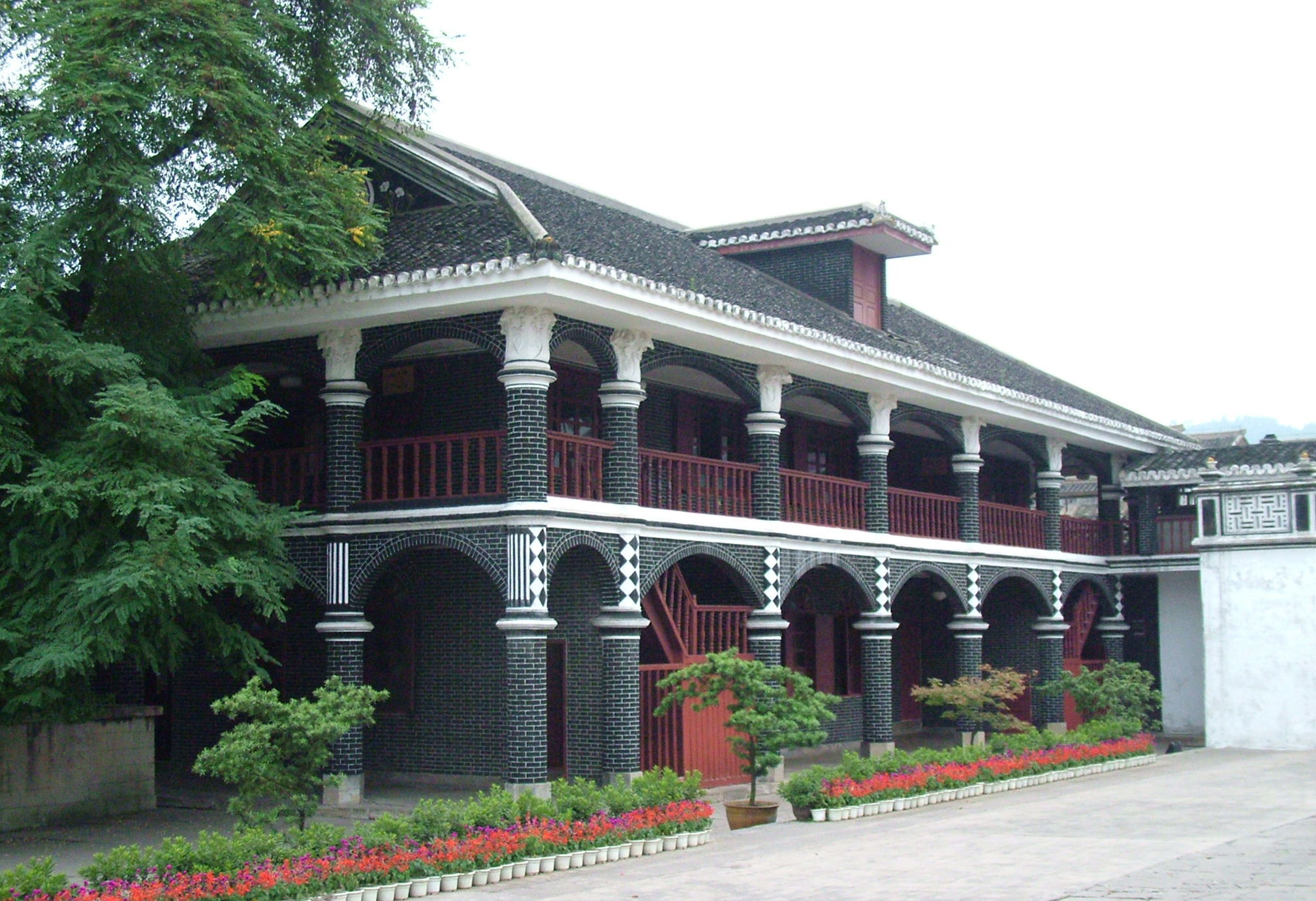
Site of the Zunyi Conference

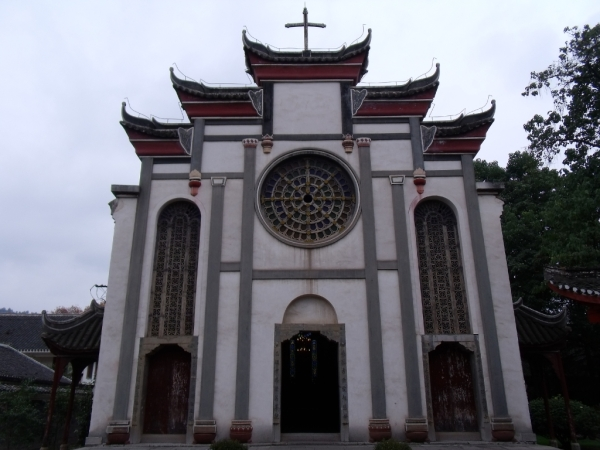
Yangliujie Catholic Church, a church used by the Red Army during the Zunyi Conference.

=== Museums & tourism ===
The Zunyi Conference Memorial Museum is located in Honghuagang District, and consists of several sites related to the historical Zunyi Conference.

=== Institutions of higher learning ===
Zunyi is home to the Zunyi Medical College (ZMC), which was formerly the Dalian Medical College founded in 1947. The college was moved from Dalian to Zunyi and renamed to the Zunyi Medical College with the approval of the State Council in 1969. Another college-level institution of in the city is the Zunyi Normal College (遵义师范学院).

=== Food and liquor ===
The rice liquor Maotai is produced in the town of Maotai, known as the "national liquor of China." Zunyi is home to much chili pepper cultivation, and red sorghum is also grown in Zunyi, a key ingredient for baijiu in China.

== Cuisine ==
Zunyi Lamb Rice Noodles: Lamb rice noodles are a traditional snack in Guizhou Province and a staple breakfast food for many Guizhou people today.

Douhua noodles: With its unique combination of "tender tofu, chewy noodles, and spicy dipping sauce", it has become a representative of Guizhou's breakfast culture.

Yaxi Liangfen (Duck Creek Jelly): It is made from high-quality peas. After soaking, grinding, filtering, cooking and cooling, it is cut into thin strips.

Zunyi Red Oil Rice Noodles: It is described as tangy, spicy, refreshing, soft, and chewy.

Chicken cake: It is made from high-quality eggs, flour, cream and other ingredients, and is processed and baked with care.

== Demographics ==
According to the Seventh National Census in 2020, the city's Permanent Population (hukou) was 6,606,675. Compared with the 6,127,082 people in Sixth National Census, the total number of people increased by 479,593 in ten years, an increase of 7.83%, and the average annual growth rate was 0.76%. Among the permanent resident population, the male population is 3,341,799, accounting for 50.58%; The female population was 3,264,876 (49.42%). The Seventh National Census (100 females, male to female ratio) was 102.36, down 1.17 percentage points from 103.53 in 2010.
