= Huxiajie station =

Chongqing Rail Transit station

Huxiajie 湖霞街
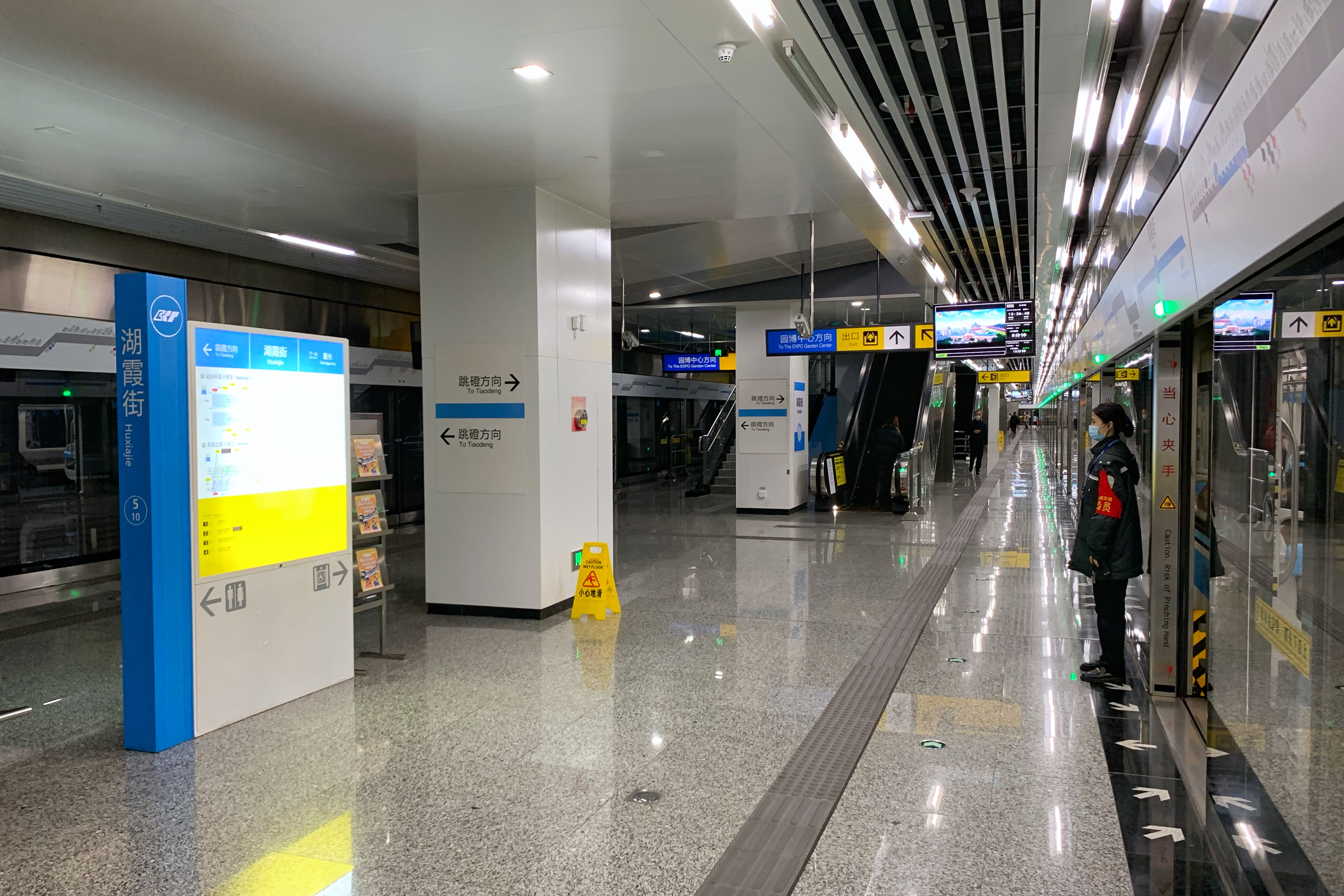

General information
- Location: Chongqing; China
- Operator: Chongqing Rail Transit Corp., Ltd
- Line: Line 5
- Platforms: 4 (2 island platforms)

Construction
- Structure type: Underground

Other information
- Station code: /

History
- Opened: 28 December 2017; 8 years ago

Services
Preceding station	Chongqing Rail Transit	Following station
Danhe towards Yuegangbeilu	Line 5	Chongguang towards Tiaodeng
Location

Huxiajie, meaning Huxia Street, is a station on Line 5 of Chongqing Rail Transit in Chongqing municipality, China. It is located in Yubei District and opened in 2017.

== Station structure ==
There are two island platforms at this station, but only two inner ones are currently in use, while the other two outer ones are reserved.

B1; Concourse	Exits, Customer service, Vending machines
B2; Platforms	No regular service
B2; Platforms	Island platform
B2; Platforms	Line 5 to Yuegangbeilu (Danhe)
B2; Platforms	Line 5 to Tiaodeng (Chongguang)
B2; Platforms	Island platform
B2; Platforms	No regular service
