= Zhongliangshan station =

Chongqing Rail Transit station

Zhongliangshan 中梁山
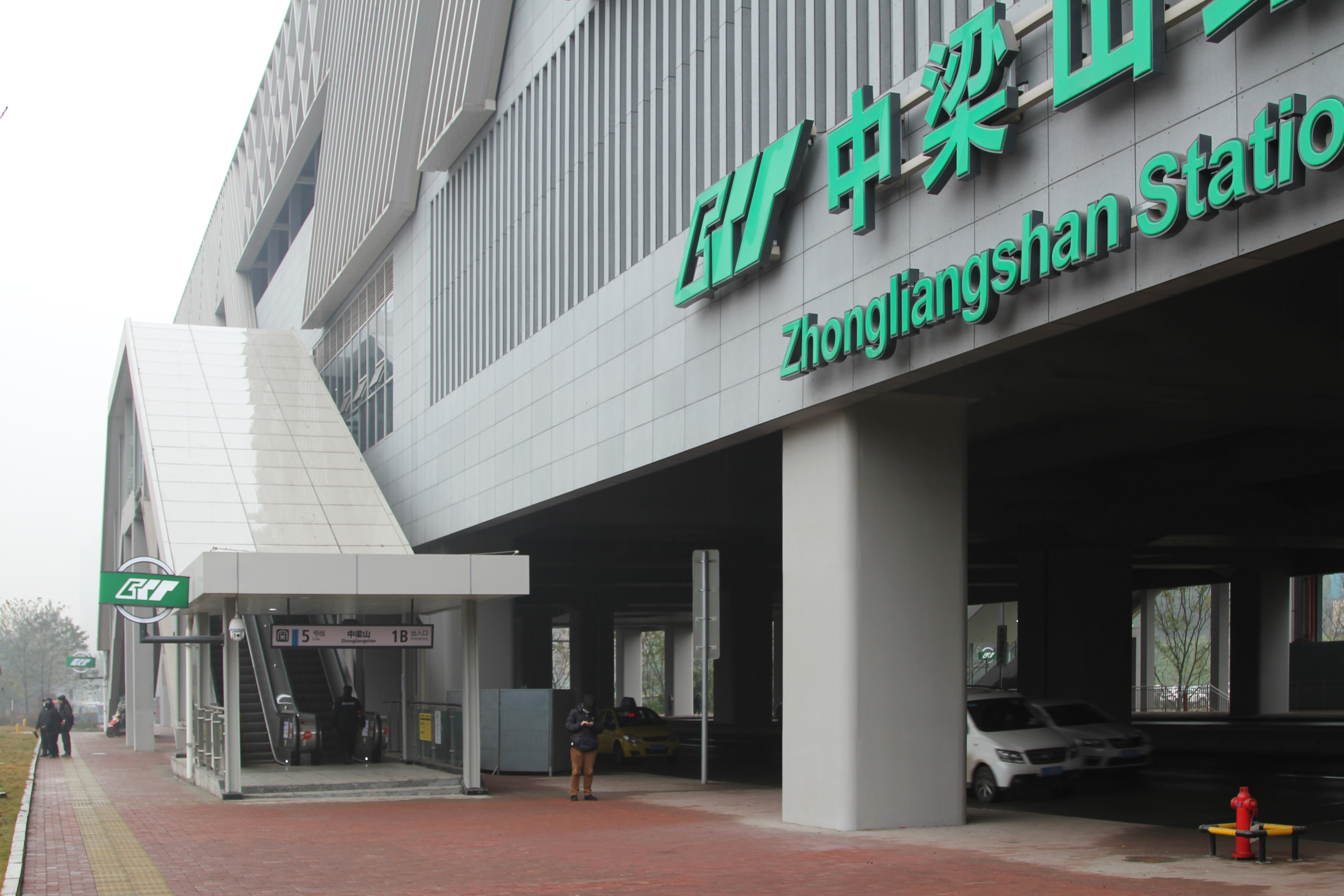

General information
- Location: Chongqing; China
- Coordinates: 29.46198°N 106.44209°E
- Operated by: Chongqing Rail Transit Corp., Ltd
- Line: Line 5
- Platforms: 4 (2 island platforms)

Construction
- Structure type: Elevated

Other information
- Station code: /

History
- Opened: 20 January 2021; 5 years ago

Services
Preceding station	Chongqing Rail Transit	Following station
Banshan towards Yuegangbeilu	Line 5	Jinjianlu towards Tiaodeng
Location

Zhongliangshan Station is a station on Line 5 of Chongqing Rail Transit in Chongqing municipality, China. It is located in Jiulongpo District and opened in 2021.

== Station structure ==
There are 2 island platforms at this station. Two outer ones are used for local trains to stop, while express trains passing through the inner tracks.

3F; Platforms	Line 5 to Tiaodeng (Jinjianlu)
3F; Platforms	Island platform
3F; Platforms	Bypass track for Line 5 express trains
3F; Platforms	Bypass track for Line 5 express trains
3F; Platforms	Island platform
3F; Platforms	Line 5 to Yuegangbeilu (Banshan)
2F; Concourse	Exits, Customer service, Vending machines, Toilets
