= Huayan Temple station =

Chongqing Rail Transit station

Huayan Temple 华岩寺
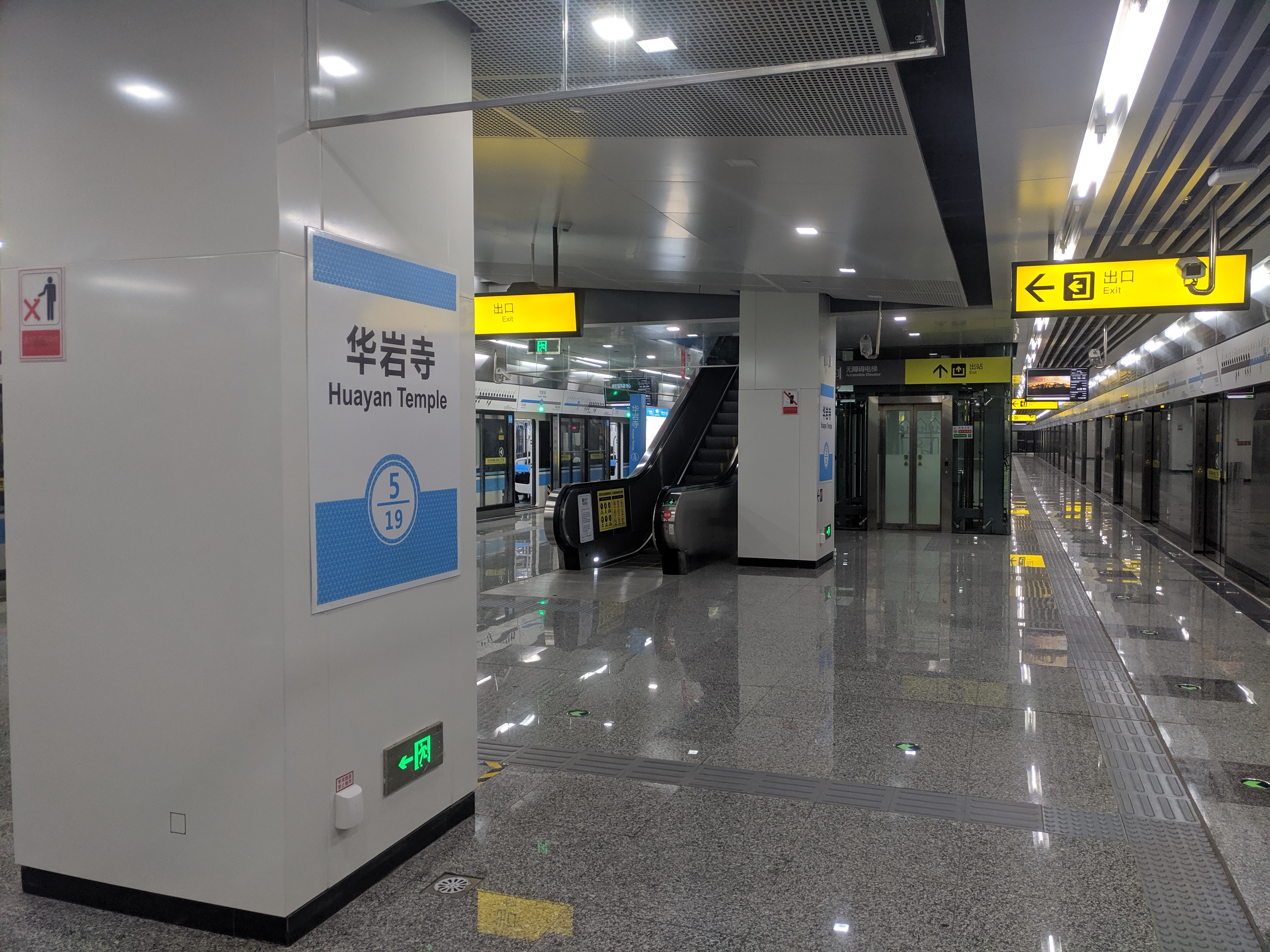

Chinese name
- Traditional Chinese: 華岩寺
- Simplified Chinese: 华岩寺
- Hanyu Pinyin: Huáyánsì
- Literal meaning: 'Elegant Rock Temple'
Transcriptions
Standard Mandarin
- Hanyu Pinyin: Huáyánsì
- Wade–Giles: Hua^{2}-yen^{2}-szŭ^{4}
- IPA: [xwǎ.jɛ̌n.sɨ̂]
Yue: Cantonese
- Yale Romanization: Wàh'ngàahmjih
- Jyutping: waa4 ngaam4 zi6
- IPA: [wa˩.ŋam˩.tsi˨]

General information
- Location: Chongqing; China
- Coordinates: 29.4965°N 106.4418°E
- Operated by: Chongqing Rail Transit Corp., Ltd
- Line: Line 5
- Platforms: 2 (1 island platform)

Construction
- Structure type: Underground

Other information
- Station code: /

History
- Opened: 20 January 2021; 5 years ago

Services
Preceding station	Chongqing Rail Transit	Following station
Chongqing West Station towards Yuegangbeilu	Line 5	Huachenglu towards Tiaodeng
Location

Huayan Temple is a station on Line 5 of Chongqing Rail Transit in Chongqing municipality, China. It is located in Jiulongpo District and opened in 2021.

== Station structure ==
B1; Concourse	Exits, Customer service, Vending machines
B2; Platforms	Line 5 to Yuegangbeilu (Chongqing West Station)
B2; Platforms	Island platform
B2; Platforms	Line 5 to Tiaodeng (Huachenglu)
