= The EXPO Garden Center station =

Metro station in Chongqing, China

The EXPO Garden Center 园博中心
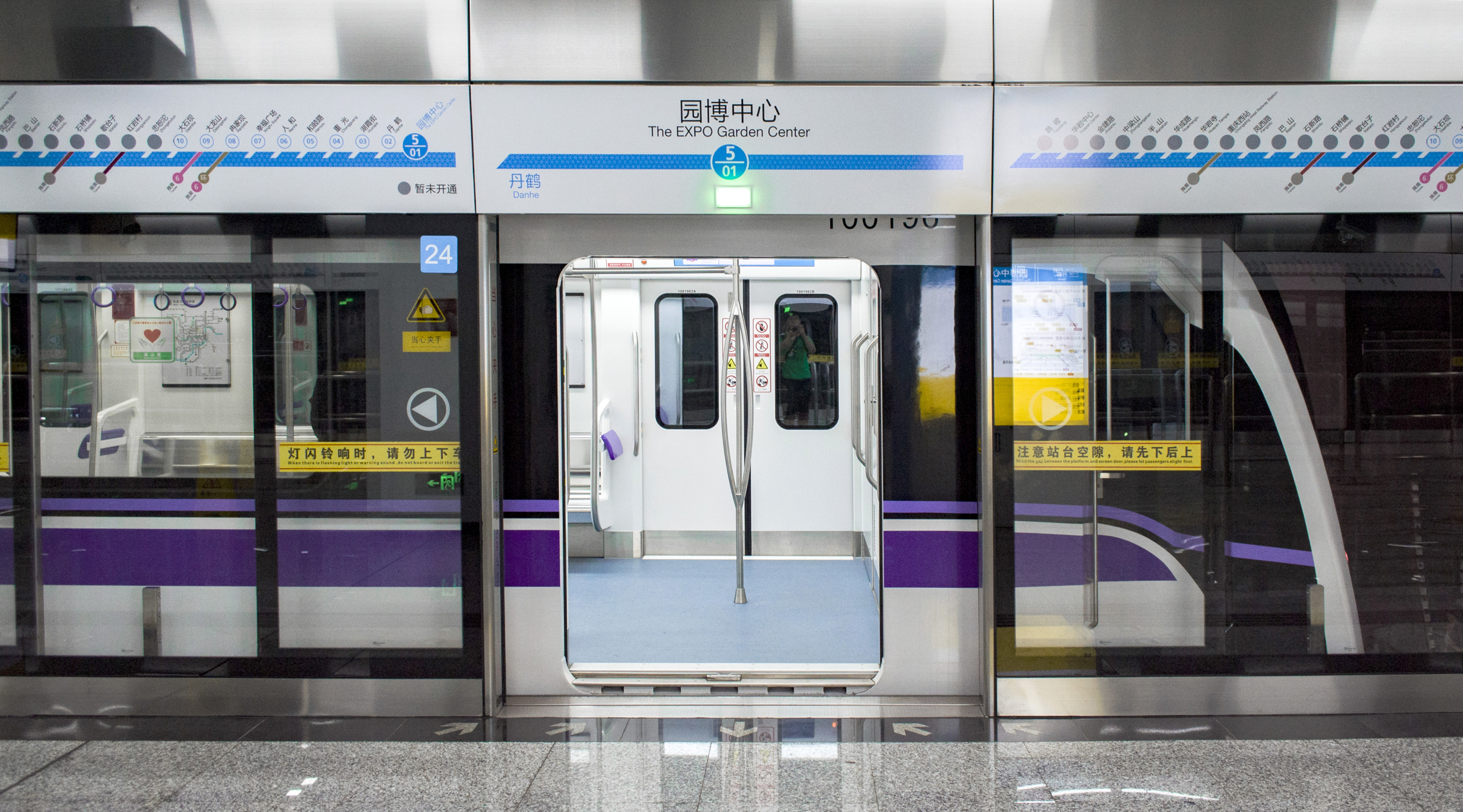
- Platform

Chinese name
- Simplified Chinese: 园博中心站
- Traditional Chinese: 園博中心站
Transcriptions
Standard Mandarin
- Hanyu Pinyin: Yuánbó Zhōngxīn Zhàn

General information
- Location: Longjing Road (龙景路); Liangjiang New Area, Chongqing; China
- Coordinates: 29°40′45″N 106°33′27″E
- System: Chongqing Rail Transit
- Operator: Chongqing Rail Transit Operation Co., Ltd.
- Line: Line 5
- Platforms: 2 (1 island platform)
- Tracks: 2

Construction
- Structure type: Underground
- Accessible: Yes

Other information
- Station code: /

History
- Opened: 28 December 2017

Services
Preceding station	Chongqing Rail Transit	Following station
Yuhegou towards Yuegangbeilu	Line 5	Danhe towards Tiaodeng
Location

The EXPO Garden Center (Chinese: 园博中心) is a station on Line 5 of Chongqing Rail Transit in Chongqing Municipality, China. It is located in Liangjiang New Area and opened in 2017.

== Station structure ==
B1	Concourse	Customer service, vending machines
B2		Line 5 to Yuegangbeilu (Yuhegou)
B2	Island platform
B2		Line 5 to Tiaodeng (Danhe)

=== Entrances/exits ===
- 1: Longjing Road, Chongqing Garden Expo Park
- 3A: Longjing Road, The EXPO Garden station
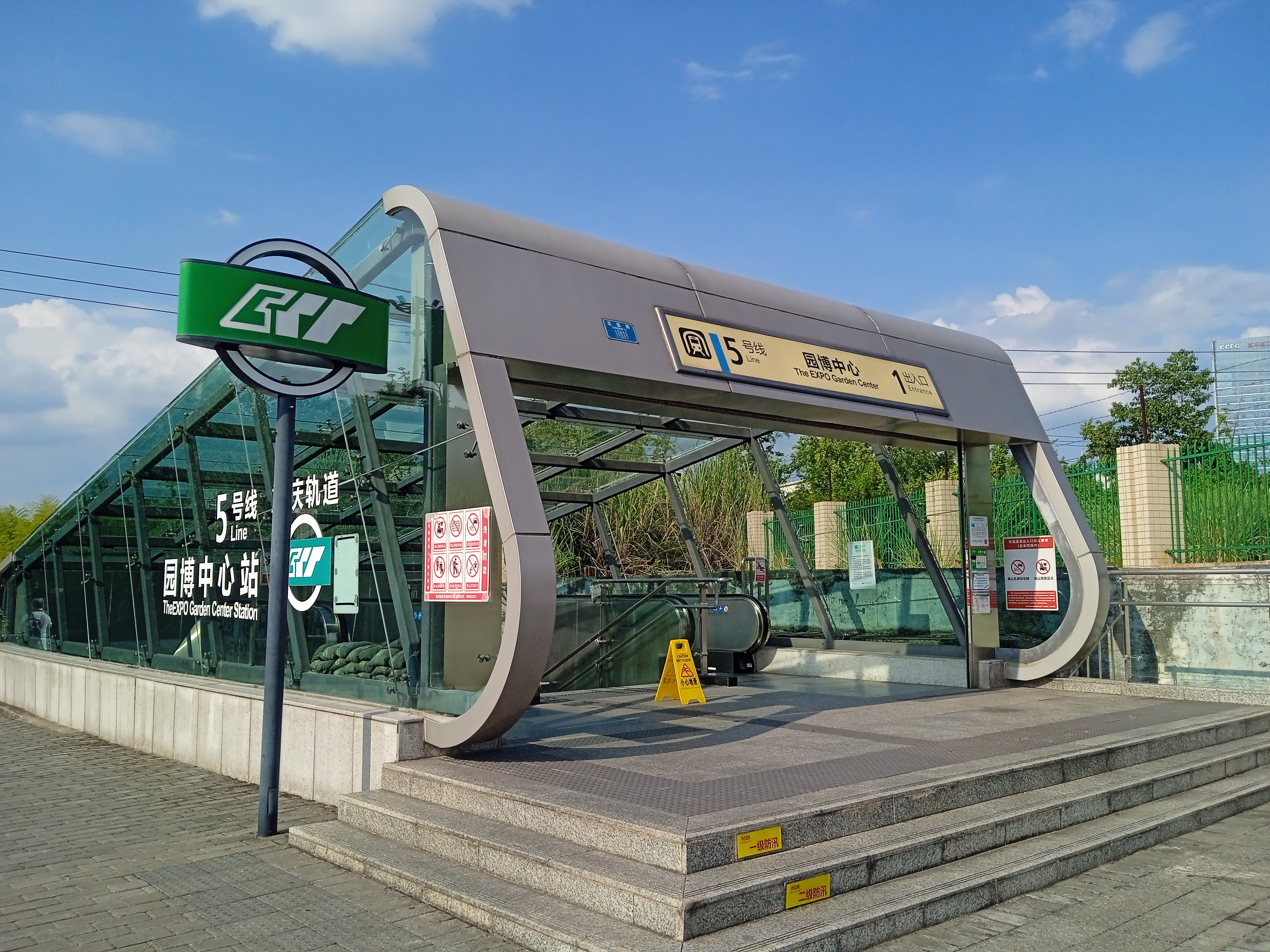
Entrance 1

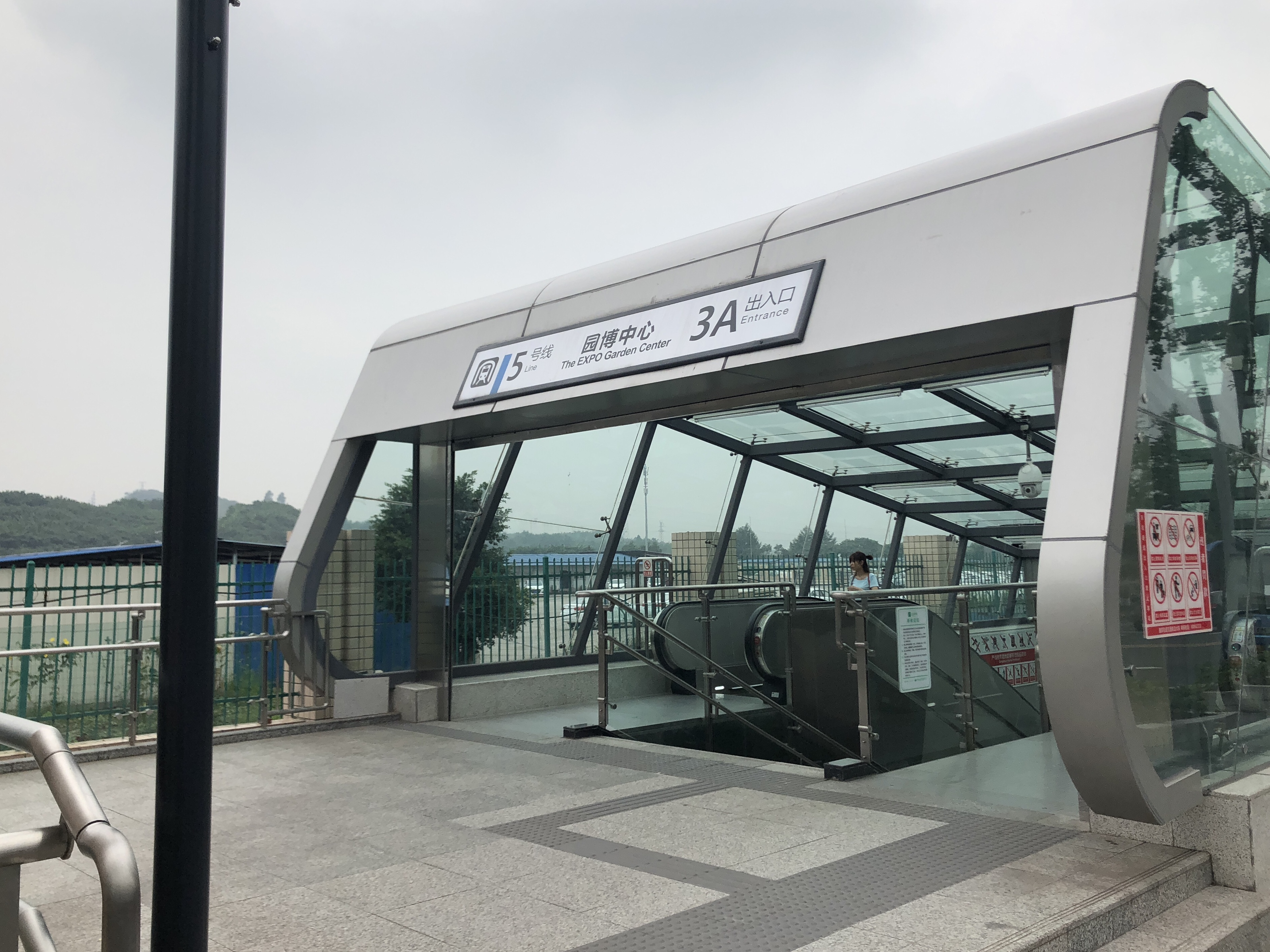
Entrance 3A
