= Zhongshutuo station =

Metro station in Chongqing, China

Zhongshutuo 忠恕沱
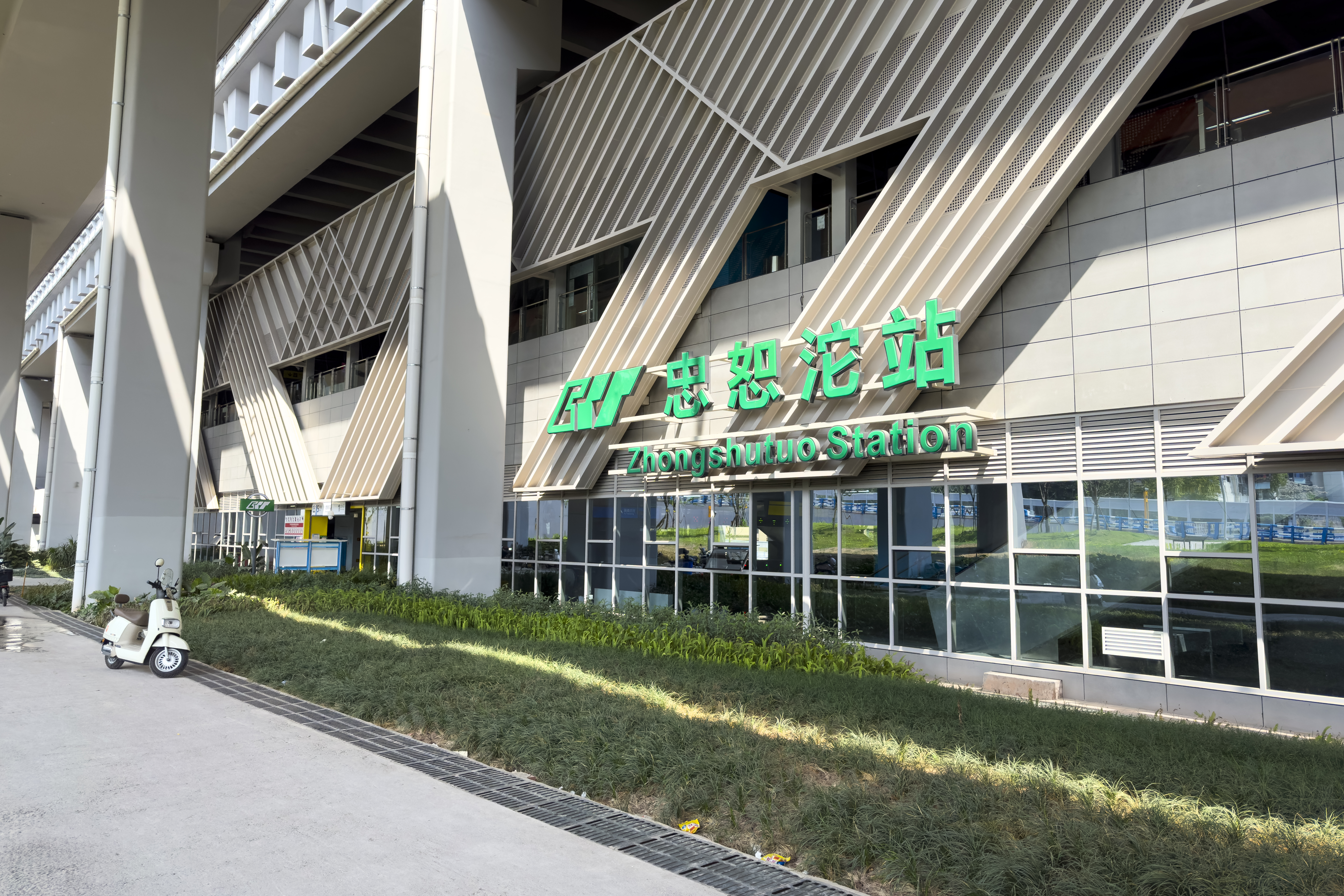
- Exterior of the station

Chinese name
- Chinese: 忠恕沱
- Hanyu Pinyin: Zhōngshùtuó
Transcriptions
Standard Mandarin
- Hanyu Pinyin: Zhōngshùtuó
- Wade–Giles: Chung^{1}-shu^{4}-t‘o^{2}
- IPA: [ʈʂʊ́ŋ.ʂû.tʰwǒ]
Yue: Cantonese
- Yale Romanization: Jūngsyutòh
- Jyutping: zung1 syu3 to4
- IPA: [tsʊŋ˥.sy˧.tʰɔ˩]

General information
- Location: Xusong Road; Dashiba Subdistrict, Liangjiang New Area, Chongqing; China
- System: Chongqing Rail Transit
- Operator: Chongqing Rail Transit Corp., Ltd
- Line: Line 5
- Platforms: 2 side platforms
- Tracks: 2

Construction
- Structure type: Elevated
- Platform levels: 2

Other information
- Station code: /

History
- Opened: November 30, 2023

Services
Preceding station	Chongqing Rail Transit	Following station
Dashiba towards Yuegangbeilu	Line 5	Hongyancun towards Tiaodeng
Location

Zhongshutuo is a station on Line 5 of Chongqing Rail Transit in Chongqing Municipality, China. It is located in Liangjiang New Area. It opened on 30 November 2023.

== Station structure ==
2F

Platforms

Side platform
Line 5 to Yuegangbeilu (Dashiba)
Line 5 to Tiaodeng (Hongyancun)
Side platform
1F

Concourse

Exits, customer service, vending machines, toilets
