= Chongqing West railway station =

China Railway and Chongqing Rail Transit station

Chongqingxi 重庆西
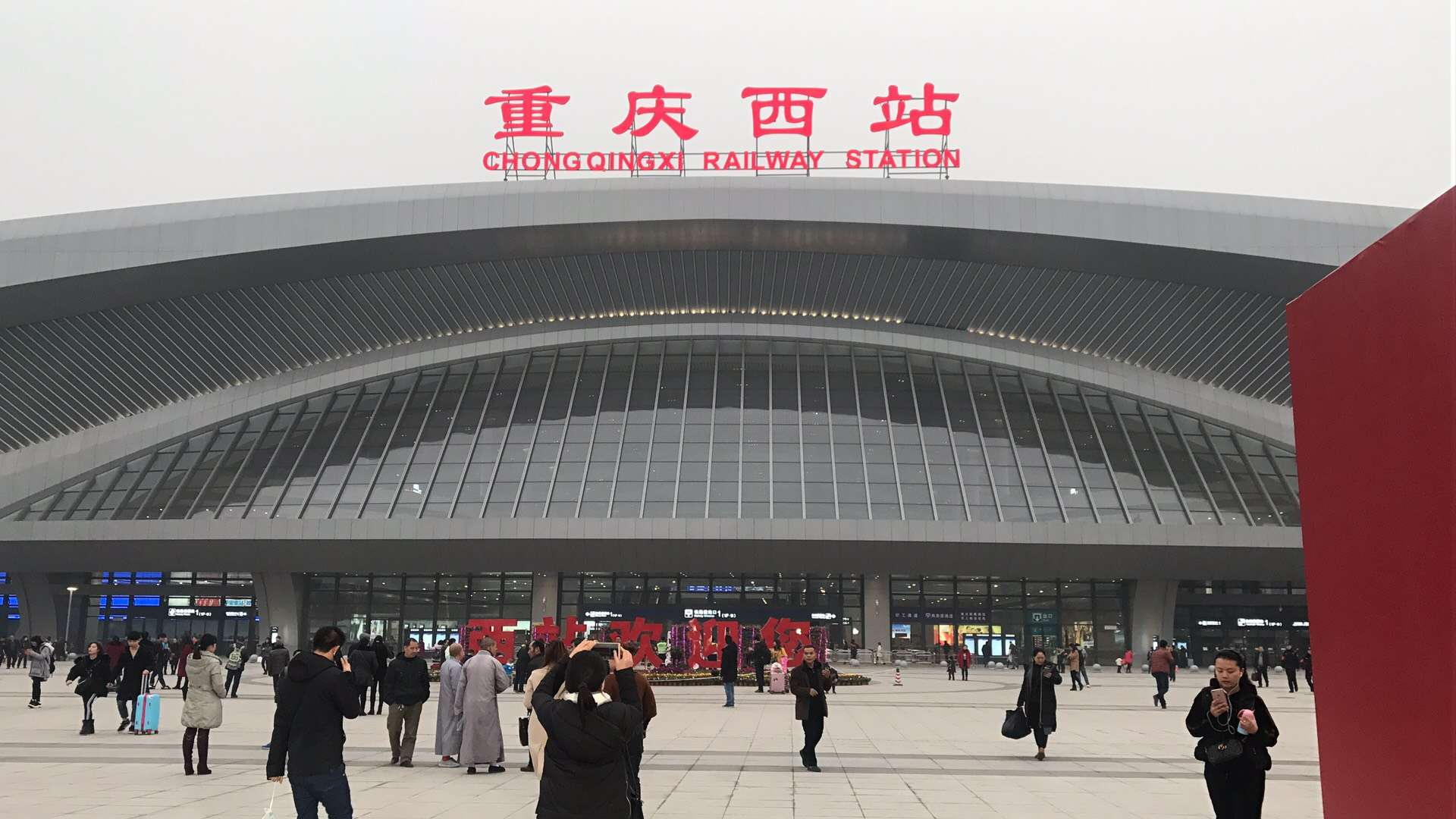
- Facade of Chongqing West railway station

General information
- Location: Shapingba District, Chongqing; China
- Coordinates: 29°30′10″N 106°26′0″E
- Operated by: Chengdu Railway Bureau; China Railway Corporation
- Lines: Sichuan–Guizhou railway Chengdu–Chongqing railway Xiangyang–Chongqing railway Chongqing–Xi'an high-speed railway (planned)

Other information
- Station code: CXW

History
- Opened: January 25, 2018; 8 years ago
Location

The Chongqing West railway station is a railway station of Chengyu Passenger Railway that is located in Shapingba District of Chongqing, People's Republic of China. It is the second largest railway station, after Xi'an North, in South Western China when opened on 25 January 2018. It will serve as Chongqing's connection with many destinations across south-western and north-western China. Situated in Shangqiao area of Shapingba, near the intersections of the G93 Chengdu–Chongqing Ring Expressway and the G85 Chongqing–Kunming Expressways. This is the third major railway station to serve Chongqing, after Chongqing North and Chongqing Stations. It opened in conjunction with the smaller nearby Shapingba station on the same day.

It will serve as a stop on the Chongqing–Lanzhou High-Speed Railway, Xiangyang-Chongqing Railway, Chongqing–Guizhou High-Speed Railway, Chongqing-Kunming Railway and Chengdu–Chongqing Railway.

== History ==
- 4 June 2007, Chongqing Municipal government & mayor, with the Office of the Planning, announced the intent to construct a third passenger station with the site for a new Chongqing transport hub discussed.
- 5 June 2007, Chongqing Media reported that the railway station would be tentatively named "New Chongqing".
- 2009, Chongqing official stated that the "New Chongqing" name would change to "Chongqing West railway Station".
- 23 August 2010, The 79th session of the Chongqing municipal government announced the preliminary adoption of the Chongqing West railway station design scheme.
- December 2014, Chongqing West railway station officially started construction.
- 31 December 2017, Chongqing West railway station held a New Year's Eve light ceremony in the East Square.
- 25 January 2018, Chongqing West railway station opened to the public.

== Station structure ==
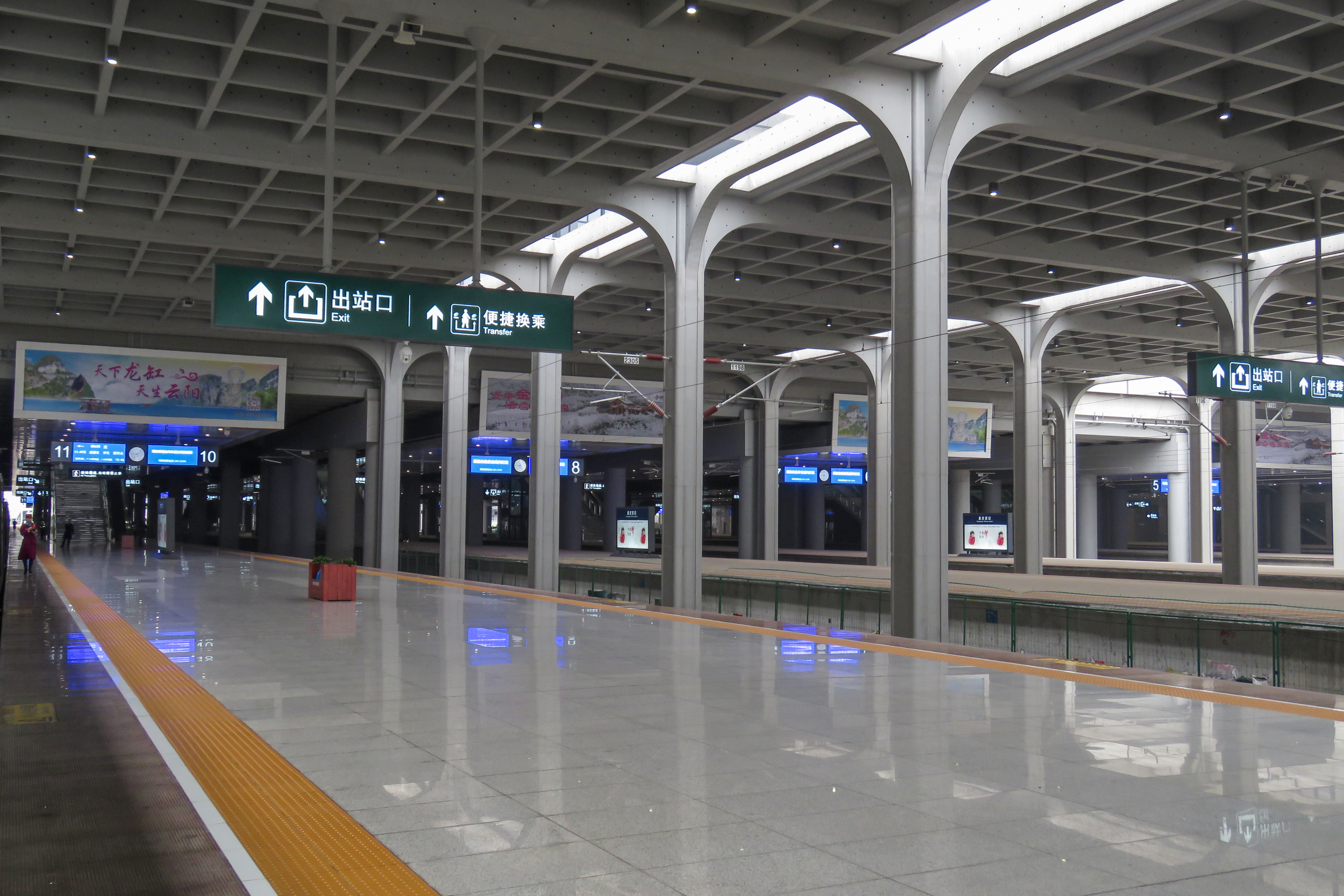
Platform of the station

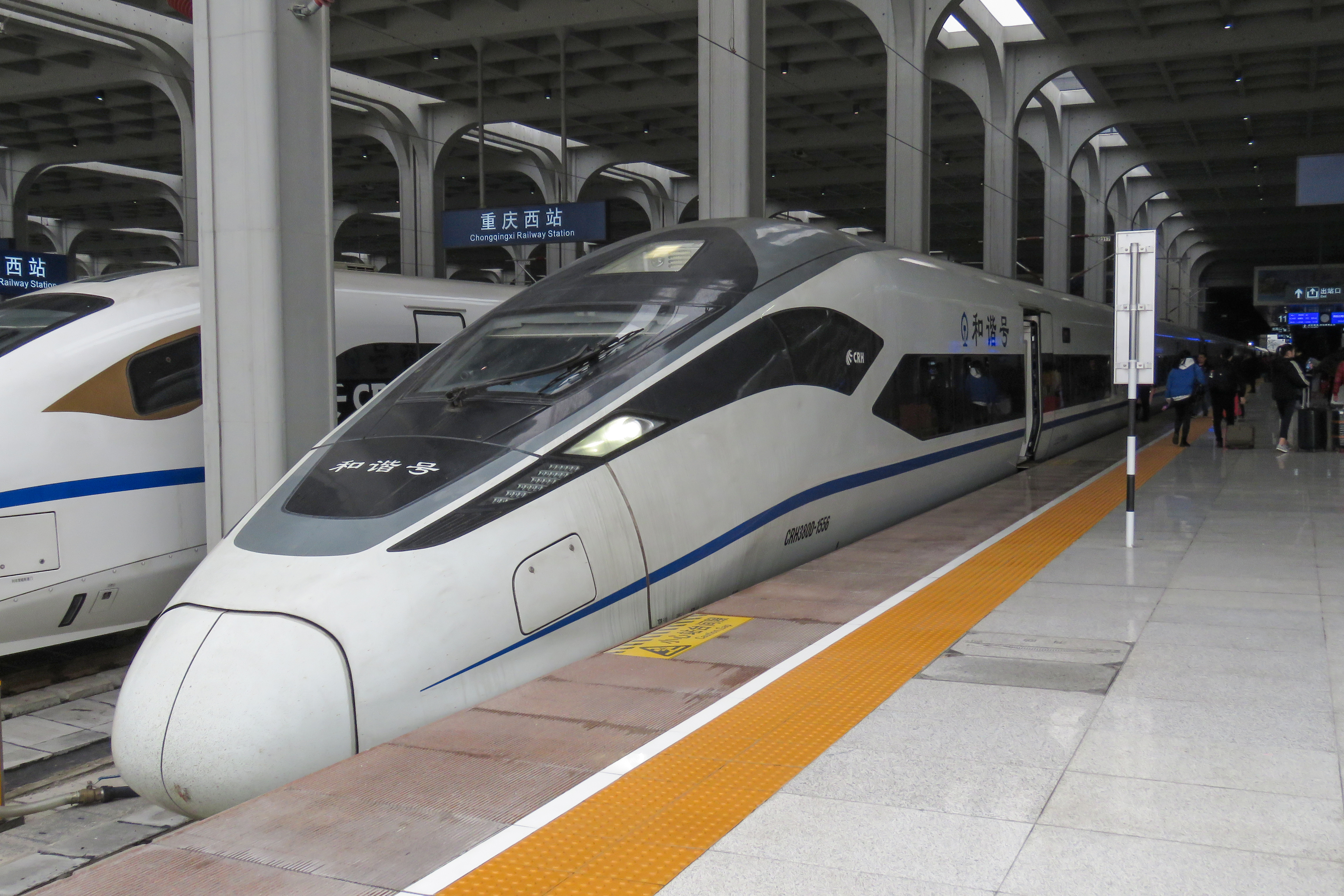
CRH380D EMU stops at the platform 11

=== Station hall ===
Chongqing West Station has been constructed as a national Principal station. Constructed over 3 years, starting in 2014, it covers an area of 120,000 square metres, with a T-shaped exterior facade. Consisting of 6 floors, 3 above and 3 below ground. It will be expected to handle 15,000 people at any single time within the main hall complex.

- The total building area of the station building is nearly 119600 square meters.
- The main Northern and Southern sides have a width of 276 meters, with the narrowest place being 150 meters.
- The Eastern and Western sides have a length of 420 meters.
- The total height of the station hall is 37 meters at an elevation of 33 meters.

Chongqing West Station adopts the modern Chinese practice with high speed railway stations with a "comprehensive traffic, three-dimensional layout". This refers to having the Waiting Hall, Platforms and Arrivals Halls on separate levels. The Station Hall has divided across five layers, with the main railway passenger station hall, a long-distance bus station, local city bus station, metro, taxi station, rental vehicles and private vehicle parking facilities.

- The top two floors above ground are fitted out as the main railway station Waiting Hall.
- Platforms are located on the middle level of the building at ground level. It also features the ticket hall, public squares on both sides, long-distance bus station and local city bus stop.
- Below ground level is the Arrivals Hall and Chongqing Rail Transit metro system Ticket Office.
- The underground Minus Two level provides transfer with the CRT Line 5 (Under Construction)
- The underground Minus Three level provides transfer with the CRT Loop Line (Under Construction)

=== Platform layout ===
Chongqing West Station consists of 15 platforms (1 side platform, 14 island platforms) that serve 29 tracks.

Platform Layout
Chengdu-Chongqing ICR↓	Track 31(Outgoing Line)
	29 Platform (High Level Island Platform)
	28 Platform (High Level Island Platform)
	30 Track
	29 Track
	27 Platform (High Level Island Platform)
	26 Platform (High Level Island Platform)
	28 Track
	27 Track
	25 Platform (High Level Island Platform)
	24 Platform (High Level Island Platform)
	26 Track
	25 Track
	23 Platform (High Level Island Platform)
	22 Platform (High Level Island Platform)
Chengdu-Chongqing ICR↑	24 Track
Chongqing–Lanzhou Railway↓	23 Track
	21 Platform (High Level Island Platform)
	20 Platform (High Level Island Platform)
	22 Track
	21 Track
	19 Platform (High Level Island Platform)
	18 Platform (High Level Island Platform)
	20 Track
	19 Track
	17 Platform (High Level Island Platform)
	16 Platform (High Level Island Platform)
	18 Track
	17 Track
	15 Platform (High Level Island Platform)
	14 Platform (High Level Island Platform)
	16 Track
	15 Track
	13 Platform (High Level Island Platform)
	12 Platform (High Level Island Platform)
	14 Track
	13 Track
	11 Platform (High Level Island Platform)
	10 Platform (High Level Island Platform)
Chongqing–Lanzhou Railway↑	12 Track
Chongqing-Guizhou HSR↓	11 Track
	9 Platform (High Level Island Platform)
	8 Platform (High Level Island Platform)
	10 Track
	9 Track
	7 Platform (High Level Island Platform)
	6 Platform (High Level Island Platform)
	8 Track
	7 Track
	6 Track
	5 Track
	5 Platform (High Level Island Platform)
	4 Platform (High Level Island Platform)
	4 Track
	3 Track
	3 Platform (High Level Island Platform)
	2 Platform (High Level Island Platform)
	2 Track
	1 Track
Chongqing-Guizhou HSR↑	1 Platform (High Level Side Platform)

== Naming confusion ==
This station should not be confused with the nearby Shapingba railway station in the same district of Chongqing. This is an existing station renovated for Chengdu–Chongqing Intercity Railway services and opened on the same day, 25 January 2018. During the planning phases, there were discussions about combining Shapingba Station and the proposed Chongqing West into one large station either on the existing Shapingba Station site or a new site where the current Chongqing West Station was constructed. This has led to the name "Chongqing West Station" or "Shapingba" being applied to both proposed station locations at various times during planning, leading to some confusion between the two sites. It was later determined that there was enough rail traffic for both stations to co-exist.

== Metro station ==
Chongqing West Station 重庆西站
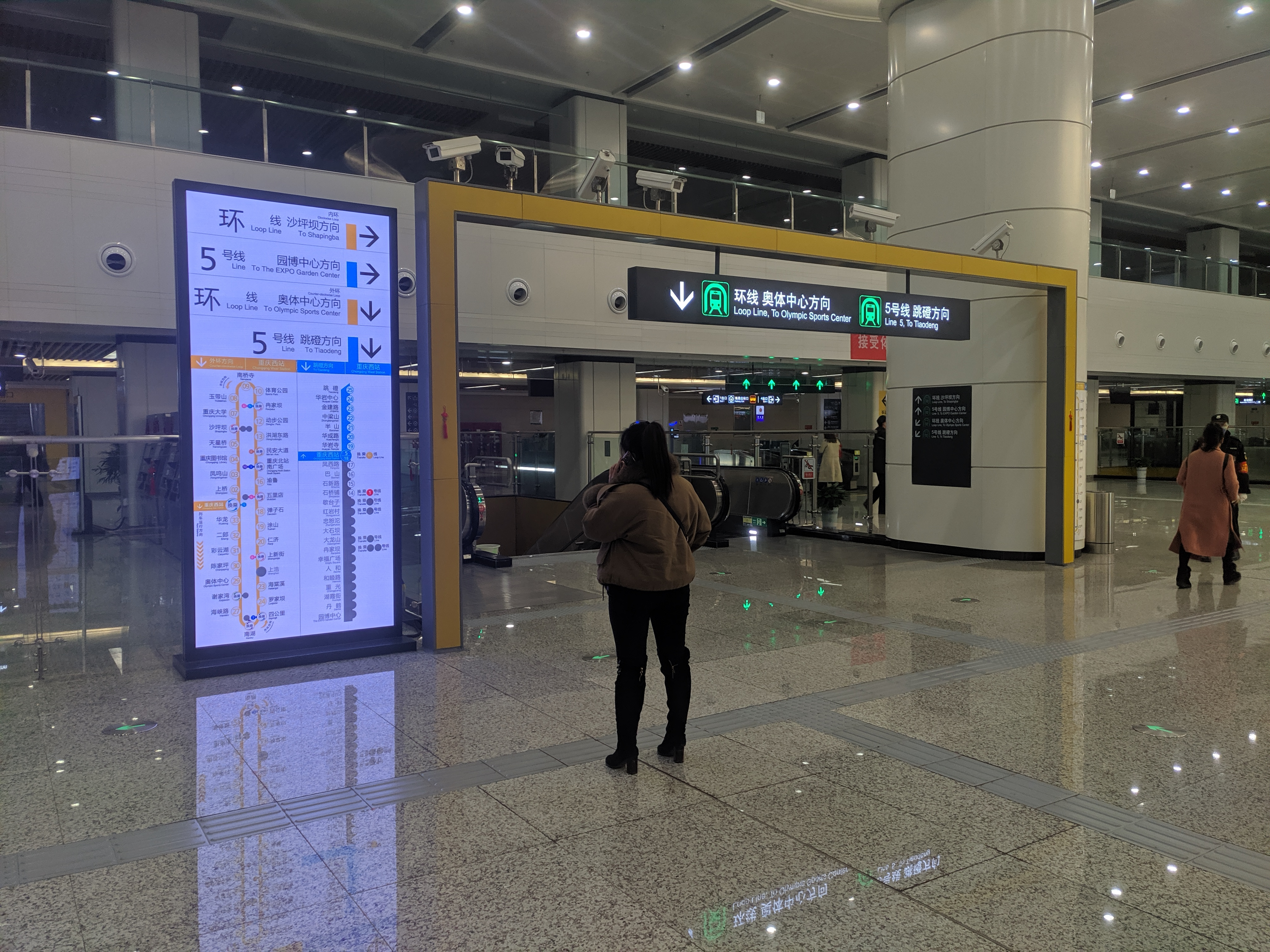
- The metro station

General information
- Location: Shapingba District, Chongqing; China
- Operated by: Chongqing Rail Transit Corp., Ltd
- Lines: Line 5 Loop line
- Platforms: 4 (2 island platforms)
- Connections: Chongqing West railway station

Construction
- Structure type: Underground
- Accessible: Accessible Elevators

Other information
- Station code: / /

History
- Opened: 20 January 2021

Services
Preceding station	Chongqing Rail Transit	Following station
Fengxilu towards Yuegangbeilu	Line 5	Huayan Temple towards Tiaodeng
Shangqiao towards Tangjiatuo	Line 5 Express	Jinjianlu towards Tiaodeng
Hualong Counter-clockwise	Loop line	Shangqiao Clockwise
Location

It is served by Line 5 (Southern section) and Loop line, which opened on 20 January 2021.

=== Station structure ===
There are 2 island platforms at this station. The two outer ones are used for Line 5 trains and through service Express trains from/to Loop line, while the other two inner ones are used for Loop line trains only. Same direction cross-platform interchange is provided between the two metro lines.

B2; Concourse	Exits, Customer service, Vending machines
B3; Platforms	Line 5 to Tiaodeng (Huayan Temple); Express trains to Tiaodeng (Jinjianlu)
B3; Platforms	Island platform
B3; Platforms	Loop line counterclockwise loop (Hualong)
B3; Platforms	Loop line clockwise loop (Shangqiao)
B3; Platforms	Island platform
B3; Platforms	Line 5 to Yuegangbeilu (Fengxilu); Express trains to Tangjiatuo (Shangqiao) via Loop line
