= Dashiba station =

Metro station in Chongqing, China

Dashiba 大石坝
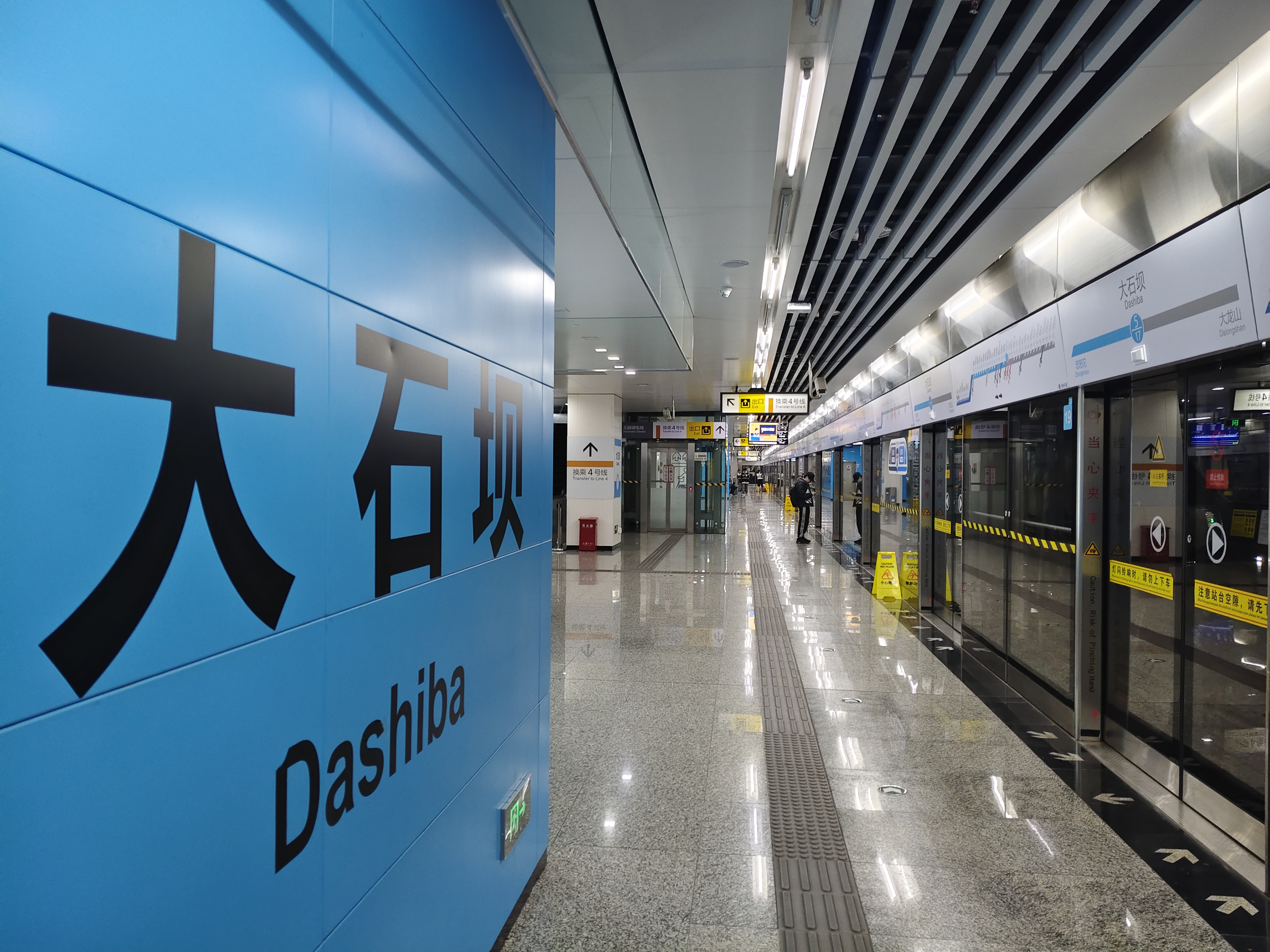
- Line 5 platform

General information
- Location: Hongshi Road; Liangjiang New Area, Chongqing; China
- Coordinates: 29°34′21.79″N 106°29′28.25″E
- System: Chongqing Rail Transit
- Operator: Chongqing Rail Transit Corp., Ltd
- Lines: Line 4 Line 5
- Platforms: 4 (2 island platforms)
- Tracks: 4

Construction
- Structure type: Underground
- Platform levels: 2
- Accessible: Yes

Other information
- Station code: / /

History
- Opened: 24 December 2018 (Line 5); 10 February 2026 (Line 4)

Services
Preceding station	Chongqing Rail Transit	Following station
Panxi towards Shimahelijiao	Line 4	Daqingcun towards Huangling
Dalongshan towards Yuegangbeilu	Line 5	Zhongshutuo towards Tiaodeng
Location

Dashiba Station is a station on Line 4 and Line 5 of Chongqing Rail Transit in Chongqing municipality, China, which is located in Liangjiang New Area. Line 5 began its service on 2018 and Line 4 began on 2026.

== Station structure ==
=== Line 4 ===
1F	Ground level	Exits
B1	Concourse	Tickets, Service Center
B2		← Line 4 towards Shimahelijiao (Panxi)
B2	Island platform, doors open on the left
B2		Line 4 towards Huangling (Daqingcun) →

=== Line 5 ===
1F	Ground level	Exits
B1	Concourse	Tickets, Service Center
B2		← Line 5 towards Yuegangbeilu (Dalongshan)
B2	Island platform, doors open on the left
B2		Line 5 towards Tiaodeng (Zhongshutuo) →
