= Huayan Center station =

Chongqing Rail Transit station

Huayan Center 华岩中心
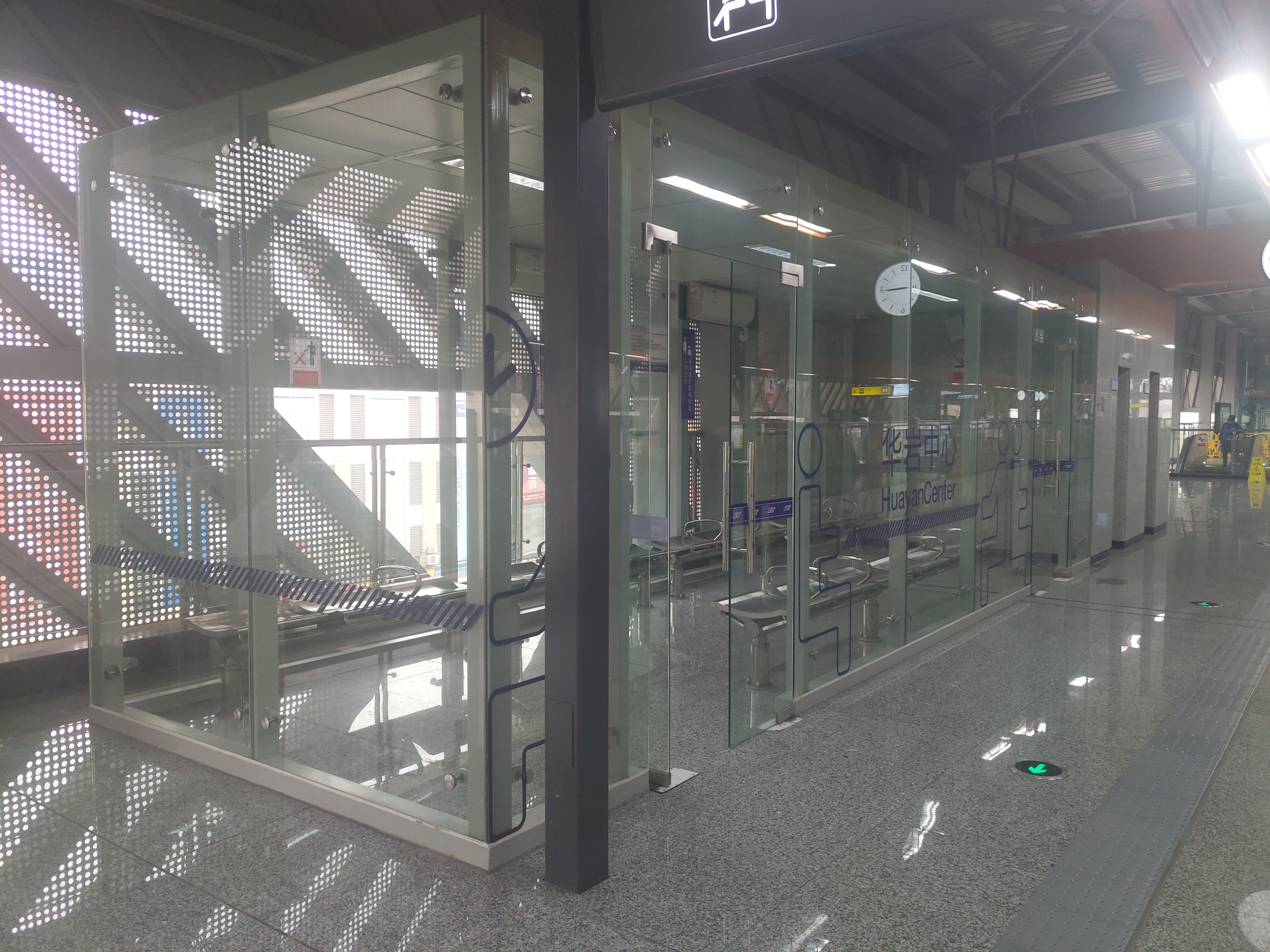

General information
- Location: Chongqing; China
- Coordinates: 29.4317°N 106.4364°E
- Operated by: Chongqing Rail Transit Corp., Ltd
- Line: Line 5
- Platforms: 2 side platforms

Construction
- Structure type: Elevated

Other information
- Station code: /

History
- Opened: 20 January 2021; 5 years ago

Services
Preceding station	Chongqing Rail Transit	Following station
Jinjianlu towards Yuegangbeilu	Line 5	Tiaodeng Terminus
Jinjianlu towards Tangjiatuo	Line 5 Express	Tiaodeng Terminus
Location

Huayan Center Station is a station on Line 5 of Chongqing Rail Transit in Chongqing municipality, China. It is located in Jiulongpo District and opened in 2021.

== Station structure ==
3F; Platforms	Side platform
3F; Platforms	Line 5 to Yuegangbeilu (Jinjianlu)
3F; Platforms	Line 5 to Tiaodeng (Terminus)
3F; Platforms	Side platform
2F; Concourse	Exits, Customer service, Vending machines, Toilets
