= Renhe station =

Renhe station may refer to:

- Renhe station (Chongqing Rail Transit), a station on the Chongqing Rail Transit in Chongqing
- Renhe station (Guangzhou Metro), a station on the Guangzhou Metro in Guangzhou, Guangdong
- Renhe station (Hangzhou Metro), a station on the Hangzhou Metro in Hangzhou, Zhejiang
