= Huachenglu station =

Huachenglu station may refer to:

- Huachenglu station (Guangzhou Metro) (Chinese: 花城路站), station of Line 9 (Guangzhou Metro)
- Huachenglu station (Chongqing Rail Transit) (Chinese: 华成路站), station of Line 5 (Chongqing Rail Transit)
