= Huachenglu station (Chongqing Rail Transit) =

Chongqing Rail Transit station

Huachenglu 华成路
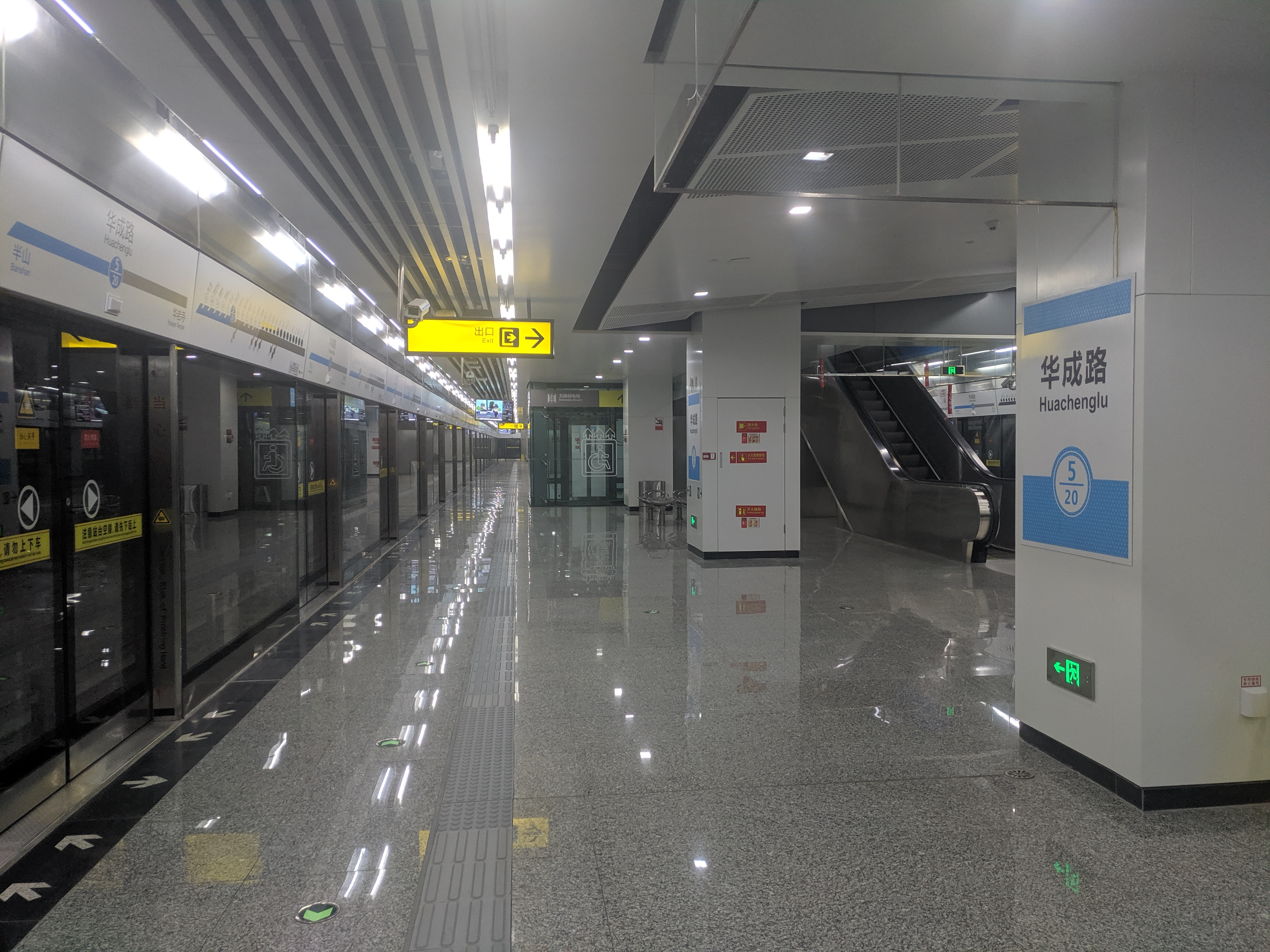

General information
- Location: Chongqing; China
- Coordinates: 29.4831°N 106.4496°E
- Operated by: Chongqing Rail Transit Corp., Ltd
- Line: Line 5
- Platforms: 2 (1 island platform)

Construction
- Structure type: Underground

Other information
- Station code: /

History
- Opened: 20 January 2021; 5 years ago

Services
Preceding station	Chongqing Rail Transit	Following station
Huayan Temple towards Yuegangbeilu	Line 5	Banshan towards Tiaodeng
Location

Huachenglu station (Chinese: 华成路站; pinyin: Huáchénglù zhàn; lit. 'Huacheng Road station') is a station on Line 5 of Chongqing Rail Transit in Chongqing municipality, China. It is located in Jiulongpo District and opened in 2021.

== Station structure ==
B1; Concourse	Exits, Customer service, Vending machines
B2; Platforms	Line 5 to Yuegangbeilu (Huayan Temple)
B2; Platforms	Island platform
B2; Platforms	Line 5 to Tiaodeng (Banshan)
