= Renhe station (Chongqing Rail Transit) =

Chongqing Rail Transit station

Renhe 人和
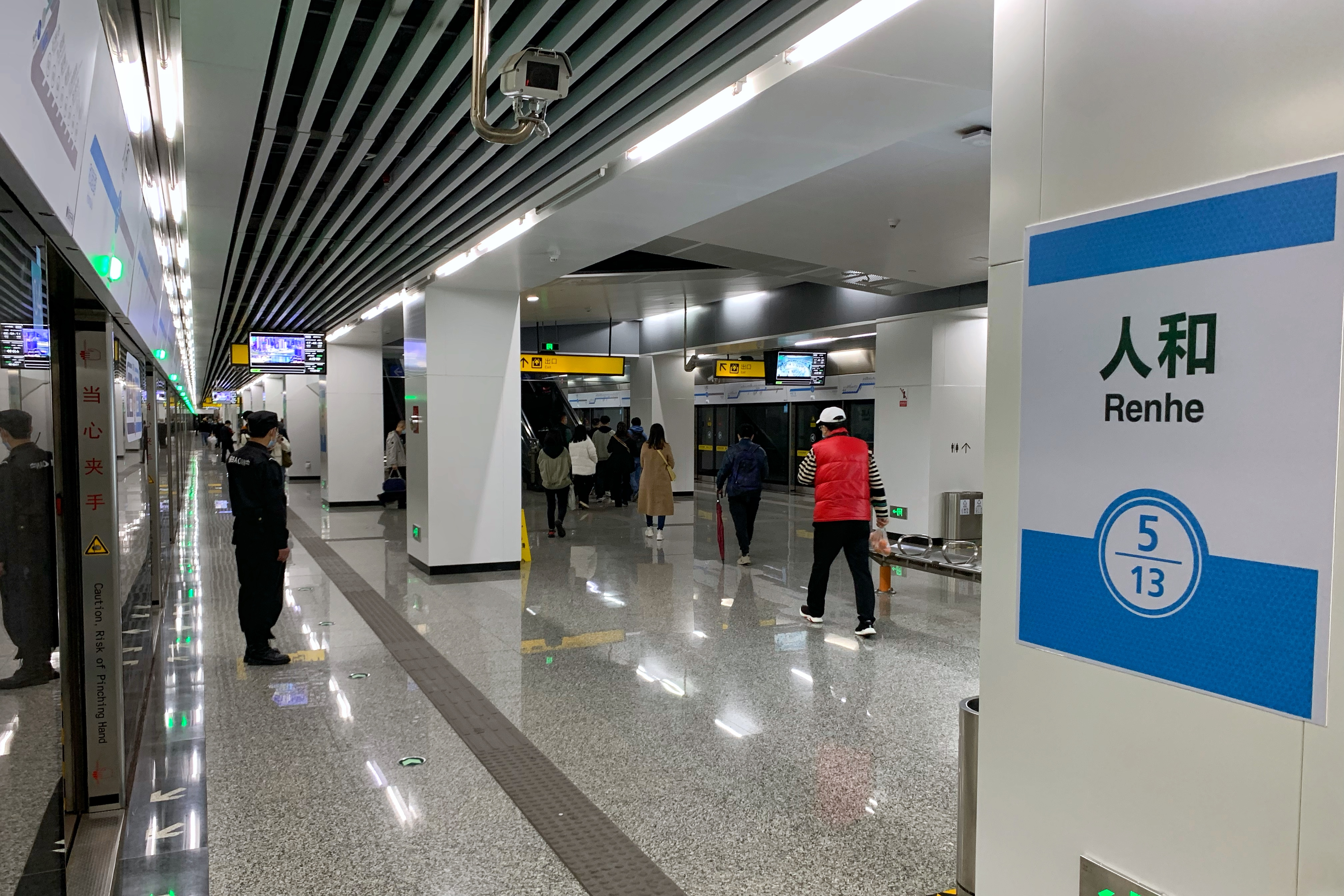

General information
- Location: Chongqing; China
- Operator: Chongqing Rail Transit Corp., Ltd
- Line: Line 5
- Platforms: 2 (1 island platform)

Construction
- Structure type: Underground

Other information
- Station code: /

History
- Opened: 28 December 2017; 8 years ago

Services
Preceding station	Chongqing Rail Transit	Following station
Hemulu towards Yuegangbeilu	Line 5	Xingfu Square towards Tiaodeng
Location

Renhe Station is a station on Line 5 of Chongqing Rail Transit in Chongqing municipality, China. It is located in Yubei District and opened in 2017.

== Station structure ==
B1; Concourse	Exits, Customer service, Vending machines
B2; Platforms	Line 5 to Yuegangbeilu (Hemulu)
B2; Platforms	Island platform
B2; Platforms	Line 5 to Tiaodeng (Xingfu Square)
