= Line 5 (Chongqing Rail Transit) =

Metro line of Chongqing Rail Transit

- 5
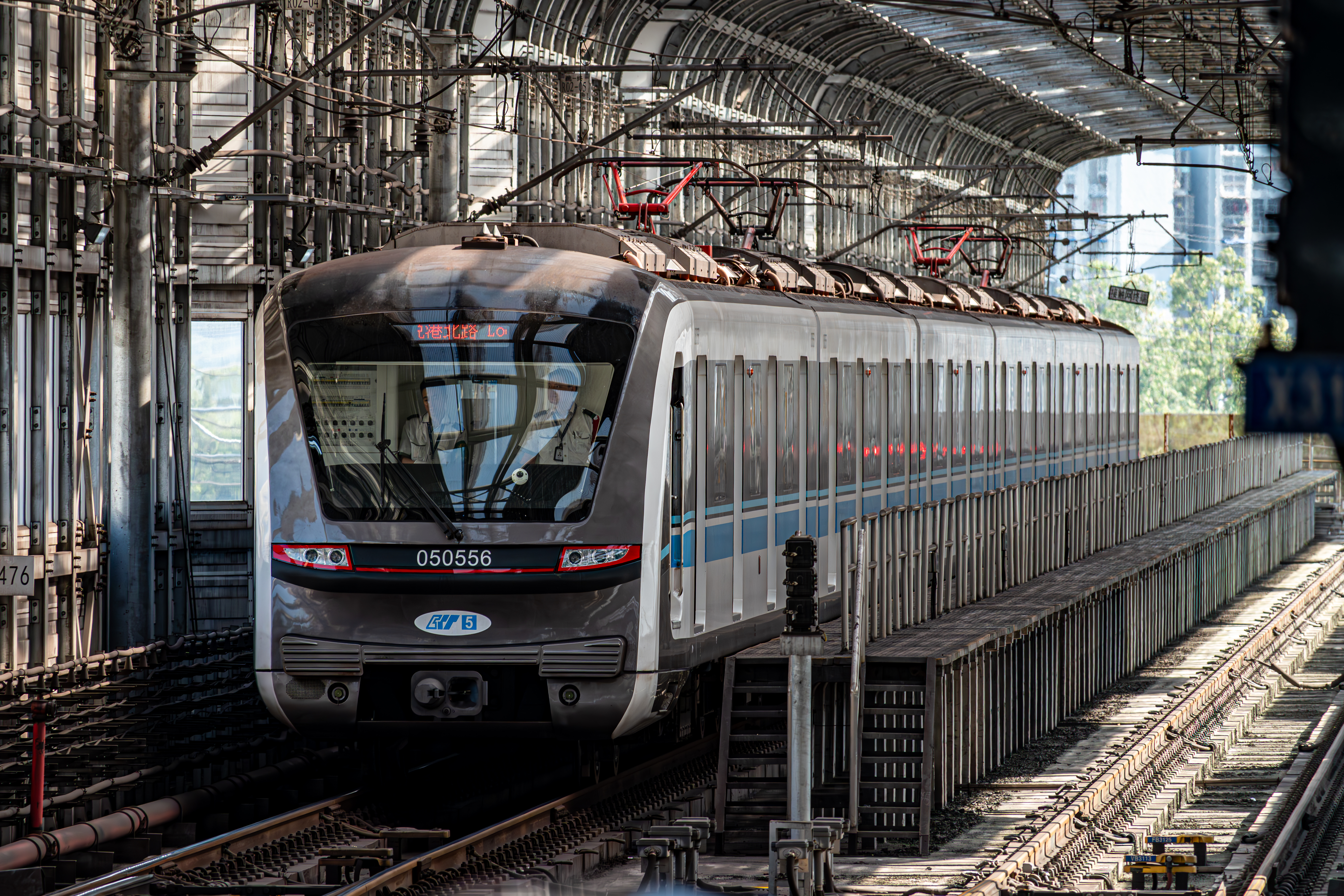
- A train of Line 5 at Tiaodeng station

Overview
- Native name: 重庆轨道交通5号线
- Status: Operational
- Owner: Chongqing City Transportation Development & Investment Group
- Line number: 5
- Locale: Chongqing, China
- Termini: Yuegangbeilu; Tiaodeng
- Stations: 32

Service
- Type: Rapid transit
- System: Chongqing Rail Transit
- Operator: Chongqing Rail Transit Operation Co., Ltd.

History
- Opened: 28 December 2017

Technical
- Line length: 48.36 km (30.05 mi)
- Num of tracks: 2
- Track gauge: 1,435 mm (4 ft 8 1/2 in)
- Electrification: 1500 V DC overhead line
- Operating speed: 100 km/h (62 mph)

Line 5 of CRT is a rapid transit line in Chongqing, China, which opened on 28 December 2017.. Line 5 is the first metro line in China which uses A-type rolling stock for steep slopes and sharp curves.

== History ==
=== Phase 1 ===
Phase 1 of the line (from The EXPO Garden Center station to Tiaodeng station) began construction on 3 December 2013.

The north section from The EXPO Garden Center to Dalongshan started operation on 28 December 2017, and it extended to Dashiba on 24 December 2018. The south section from Shiqiaopu to Tiaodeng started operation on 20 January 2021. Due to difficults on bridge building, the central section from Dashiba to Shiqiaopu is opened several years later, on 30 November 2023.

=== Northern extension ===
The northern extension of this line began construction on 25 January 2019. The extension is 8.95 km (5.56 mi) in length with 7 new stations. The extension opened on 27 February 2023.

== Opening timeline ==
Segment	Commencement	Length	Station(s)	Name
The EXPO Garden Center – Dalongshan	28 December 2017	16.42 km (10.20 mi)	9	Phase 1 (North Section)
Dalongshan – Dashiba	24 December 2018	16.42 km (10.20 mi)	1	Phase 1 (North Section)
Shiqiaopu – Tiaodeng	20 January 2021	18.34 km (11.40 mi)	12	Phase 1 (South Section)
The EXPO Garden Center – Yuegangbeilu	27 February 2023	8.95 km (5.56 mi)	6	Northern Extension
Dashiba – Shiqiaopu	30 November 2023	4.95 km (3.08 mi)	3	Phase 1 (Central Section)
Yuhegou	15 July 2025	—	1	Infill station

== Stations ==
=== Route map ===
Route of Line 5

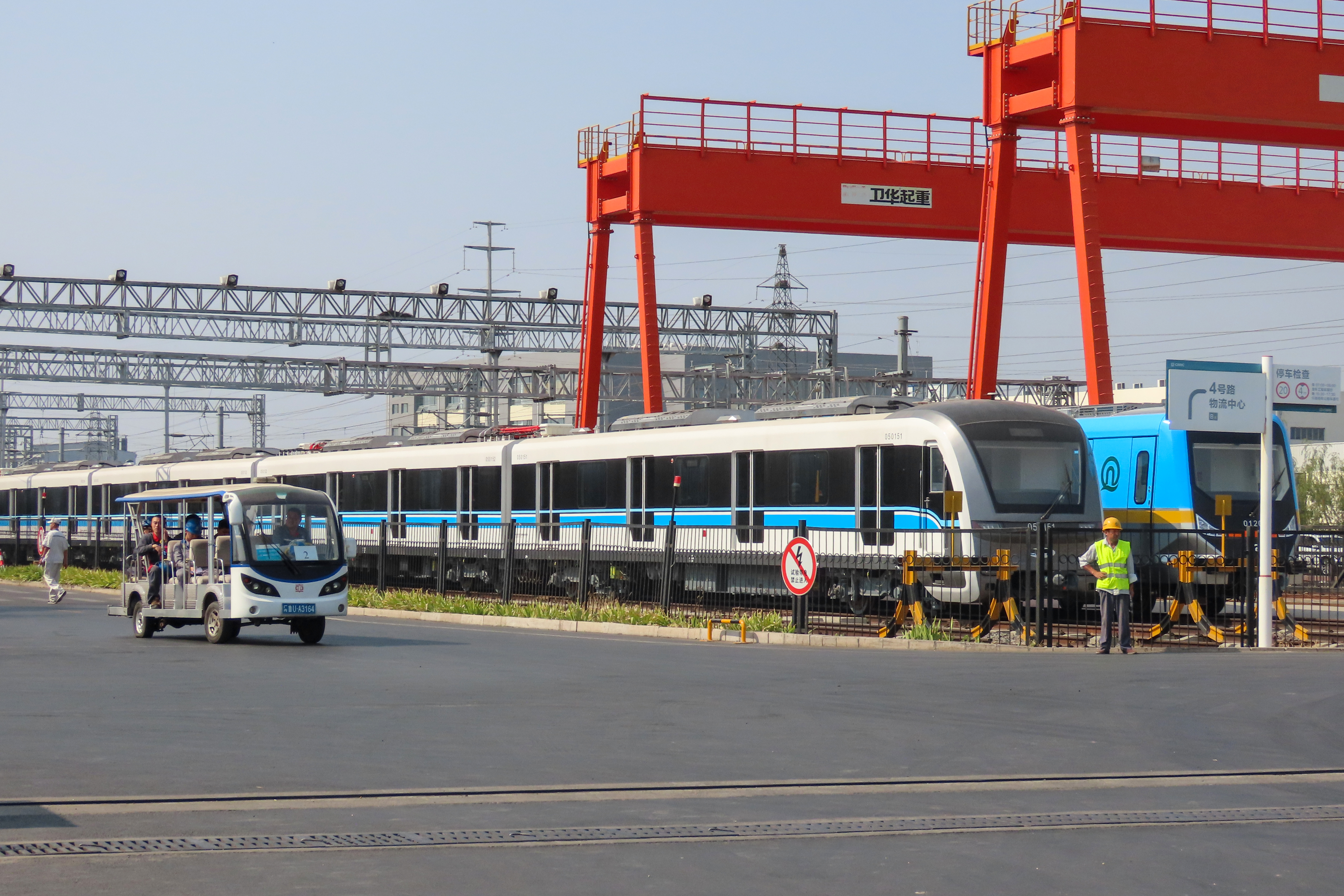
Line 5 train at CRRC Qingdao Sifang

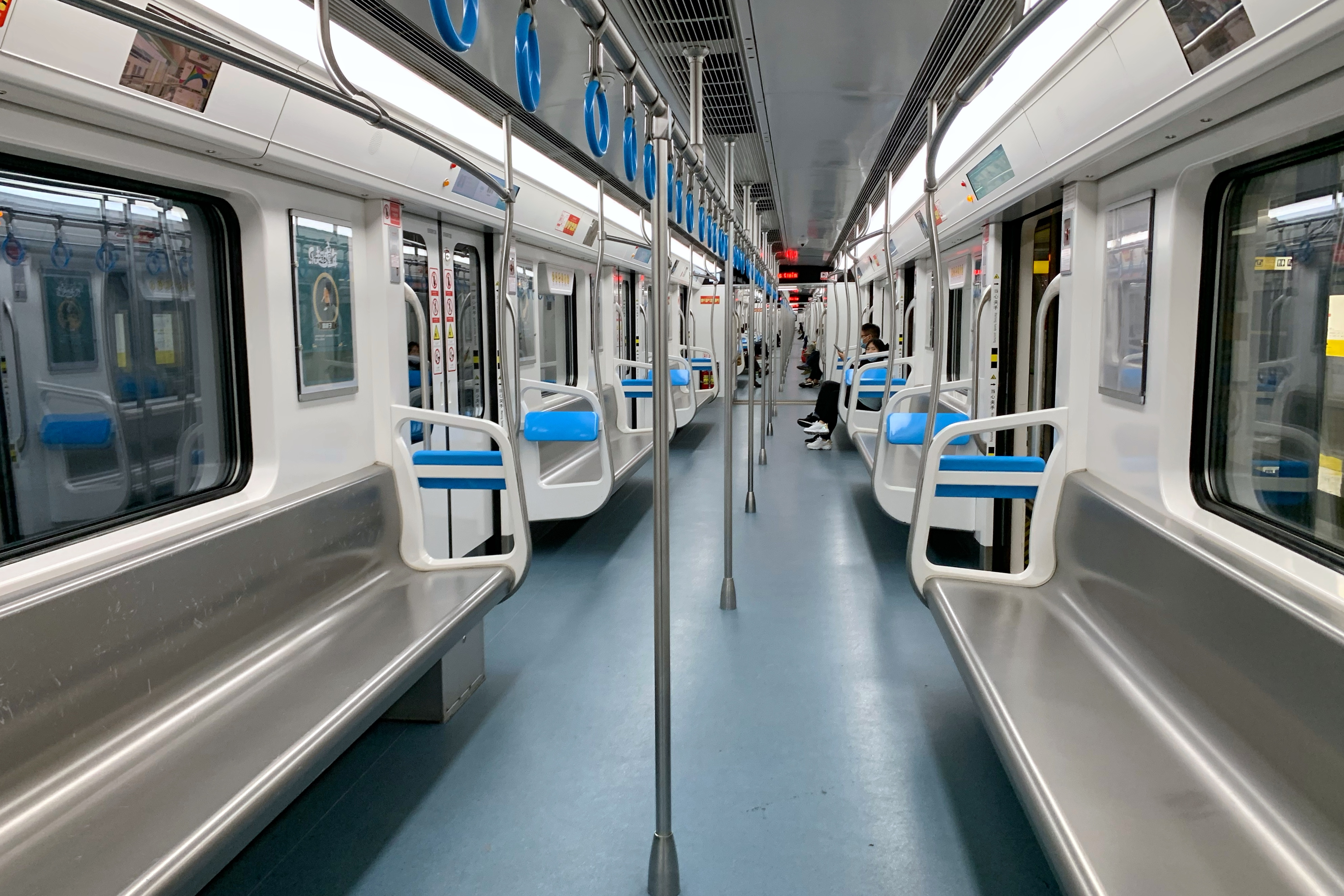
Interior of a Line 5 train

=== Line 5 ===
Service routes				Station №	Station name		Connections	Distance km		Location
E	Local			Station №	English	Chinese	Connections	Distance km		Location
	●			/	Yuegangbeilu	悦港北路		–	0	Liangjiang
	●			/	Yuegang Ave.	悦港大道		0.94	0.94	Liangjiang
	●			/	Chunxuan Ave.	椿萱大道		1.22	2.16	Liangjiang
	●			/	Central Park West	中央公园西	Line 10	1.28	3.44	Liangjiang
	●			/	Lujiagou	鲁家沟		1.27	4.71	Liangjiang
	●			/	Ganyue Ave.	甘悦大道		0.92	5.63	Liangjiang
	●			/	Yuhegou	玉河沟		0.96	6.59	Liangjiang
	●	●		/	The EXPO Garden Center	园博中心		2.35	8.94	Liangjiang
	●	●		/	Danhe	丹鹤		1.37	10.31	Liangjiang
	●	●		/	Huxiajie	湖霞街		1.47	11.78	Liangjiang
	●	●		/	Chongguang	重光	15	1.49	13.27	Liangjiang
	●	●		/	Hemulu	和睦路		2.41	15.68	Liangjiang
	●	●		/	Renhe	人和		1.40	17.08	Liangjiang
	●	●		/	Xingfu Square	幸福广场		1.94	19.02	Liangjiang
	●	●		/	Ranjiaba	冉家坝	Line 6 Loop line	2.55	21.57	Liangjiang
	●	●		/	Dalongshan	大龙山	Line 6	1.01	22.58	Liangjiang
	●	●		/	Dashiba	大石坝	Line 4	2.47	25.05	Liangjiang
	●	●		/	Zhongshutuo	忠恕沱		0.86	25.91	Liangjiang
	●	●		/	Hongyancun	红岩村	Line 9	1.28	27.19	Yuzhong
	●	●		/	Xietaizi	歇台子	Line 1 Line 18	1.66	28.85	Jiulongpo
	●	●	●	/	Shiqiaopu	石桥铺	Line 1 27	1.56	30.41	Jiulongpo
	●	●	●	/	Shixinlu	石新路		1.11	31.52	Jiulongpo
	●	●	●	/	Bashan	巴山		1.02	32.54	Jiulongpo
	●	●	●	/	Fengxilu	凤西路		1.81	34.35	Shapingba
↑				Through-service to/from Tangjiatuo via Loop line						
●	●	●	●	/	Chongqing West Station	重庆西站	Loop line CXW	2.75	37.10	Shapingba
｜	●	●	●	/	Huayan Temple	华岩寺		0.97	38.07	Jiulongpo
｜	●	●	●	/	Huachenglu	华成路		2.02	40.09	Jiulongpo
｜	●	●	●	/	Banshan	半山		0.86	40.95	Jiulongpo
｜	●	●	●	/	Zhongliangshan	中梁山		1.58	42.53	Jiulongpo
●	●	●	●	/	Jinjianlu	金建路		1.91	44.44	Jiulongpo
●	●	●	●	/	Huayan Center	华岩中心		1.50	45.94	Jiulongpo
●	●	●	●	/	Tiaodeng	跳磴	Jiangtiao line Line 18	2.38	48.32	Dadukou
			↓	Through-service to/from Shengquansi via Tiaodeng via Jiangtiao line						

=== Jiangtiao line ===
Jiangtiao line (Chinese: 江跳线) had been formerly known as the extension of Line 5. The section from Tiaodeng to Shengquansi (28.22 km (17.54 mi) in length) opened in August 2022. The section from Shengquansi to Dingshan (4.524 km (2.811 mi) in length) is currently under construction.
