= Jiangtiao line =

Suburban railway line in Chongqing, China

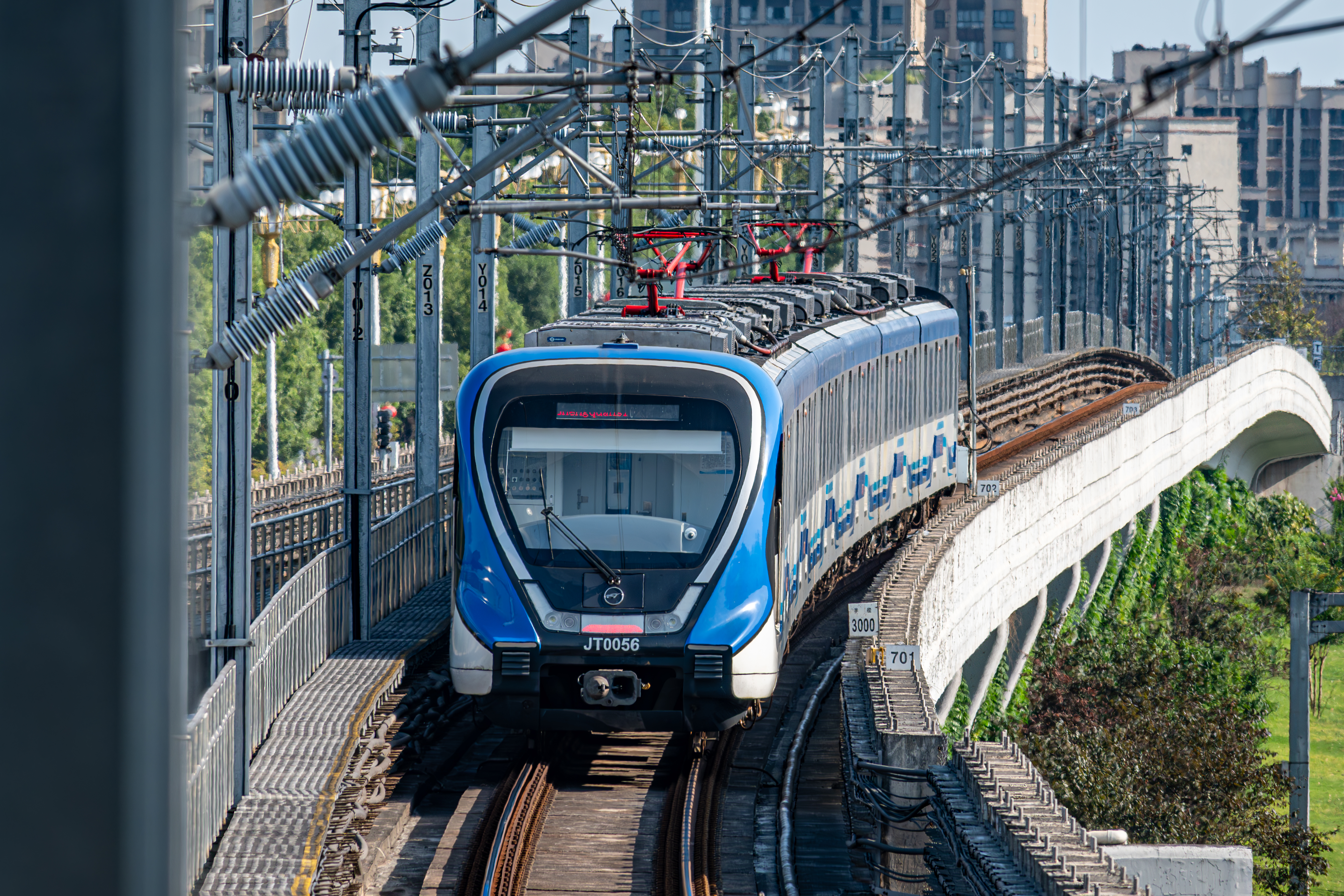
- A Jiangtiao Line train at Jiangjin High-Speed Railway station

Overview
- Other name: Tiaodeng-Jiangjin Line
- Native name: 重庆市郊铁路江跳线
- Status: Operational
- Locale: Chongqing, China
- Termini: Tiaodeng; Shengquansi
- Stations: 7

Service
- Type: Rapid transit
- System: Chongqing Rail Transit; Chongqing Suburban Railway
- Operator(s): Chongqing Jiangtiao Line Rail Transit Operation Management Co., Ltd.

History
- Opened: 6 August 2022; 4 years ago

Technical
- Line length: 28.22 km (17.54 mi) (Tiaodeng – Shengquansi); 4.6 km (2.9 mi) (Shengquansi – Dingshan, under planning)
- Num of tracks: 2
- Track gauge: 1,435 mm (4 ft 8 1/2 in) standard gauge
- Electrification: Overhead line with Multiple systems; 25 kV 50 Hz AC (Jiulongyuan – Shengquansi); 1,500 V DC (Tiaodeng – Shilinsi)
- Operating speed: 120 km/h (75 mph) (Peak)

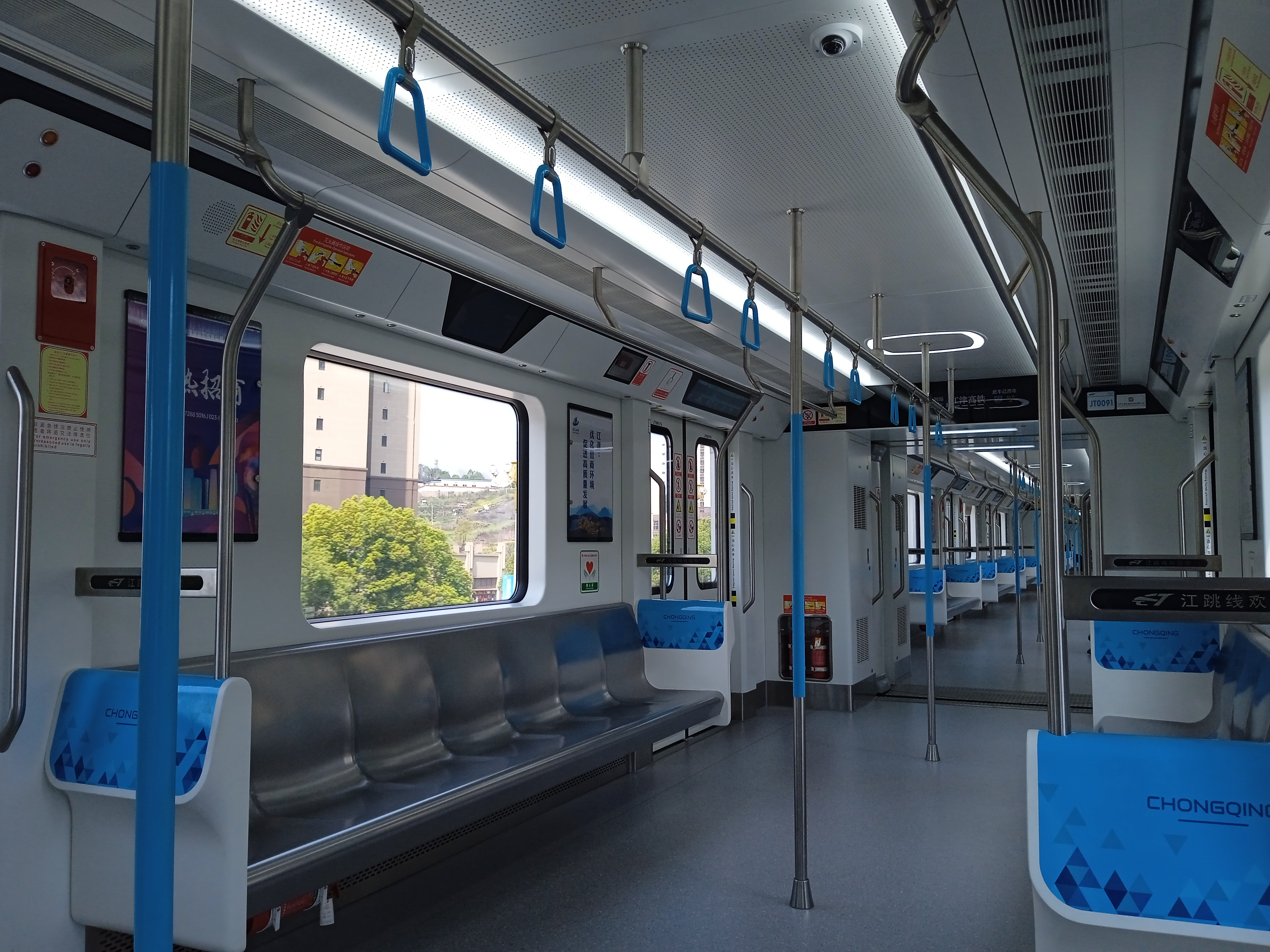
Interior of a Jiangtiao Line train

Jiangtiao line of Chongqing Suburban Railway is a suburban rapid transit line in Chongqing, China. The initial section of Jiangtiao line from Tiaodeng to Shengquansi opened on 6 August 2022.

This line had been known as the extension of Line 5 during its construction. Nevertheless, by the time it started operation, the color, train numbers and station codes of this line had all been separated from Line 5. Since November 30th, 2023, through operation between Line 5 and this line came into service.

Jiangtiao line is also the first rapid transit line in China that supports auto-switching between AC and DC sections without dropping pantographs down. Switch actions are performed at a dead section east of Zhongliangshan Tunnel.

== Sections ==
=== Tiaodeng – Shengquansi ===
The initial section from Tiaodeng to Shengquansi began construction in 2015. The initial section is about 28.22 km (17.54 mi) in length, including 5.8 km (3.6 mi) underground section and 22.42 km (13.93 mi) elevated or at-grade. The section opened on 6 August 2022.

=== Shengquansi – Dingshan ===
The remaining section from Shengquansi to Dingshan is currently under construction. Construction started on 28 December 2022. The section will be 4.524 km (2.811 mi) in length with 2 stations.

== Opening timeline ==
Segment	Commencement	Length	Station(s)	Name
Tiaodeng – Shengquansi	6 August 2022	28.22 km (17.54 mi)	7	Initial section

== Stations ==
Route of Jiangtiao line

Legend

- In operation
- Under planning

Service routes		Station No.	Station name		Connections	Distance km		Power supply	Location
Service routes		Station No.	English	Chinese	Connections	Distance km		Power supply	Location
	↑	Through-service to/from Shiqiaopu via Tiaodeng via Line 5							
●	●	/	Tiaodeng	跳磴	Line 5 Line 18	-	0	1500 V DC	Dadukou
●	●	/	Shilinsi	石林寺		0.97	0.97	1500 V DC	Dadukou
●	●	/	Jiulongyuan	九龙园		7.36	8.33	25 kV 50 Hz AC	Jiulongpo
●	●	/	Shuangfu	双福		4.32	12.65	25 kV 50 Hz AC	Jiangjin
●	●	/	Xiangtang	享堂		5.32	17.97	25 kV 50 Hz AC	Jiangjin
●	●	/	Jiangjin High-Speed Railway	江津高铁	Jiangjinbei	4.37	22.34	25 kV 50 Hz AC	Jiangjin
●	●	/	Shengquansi	圣泉寺		3.99	26.33	25 kV 50 Hz AC	Jiangjin
		/	Jijiang	几江				25 kV 50 Hz AC	Jiangjin
		/	Dingshan	鼎山				25 kV 50 Hz AC	Jiangjin
