= Tiaodeng station =

Chongqing Rail Transit station

Tiaodeng 跳磴
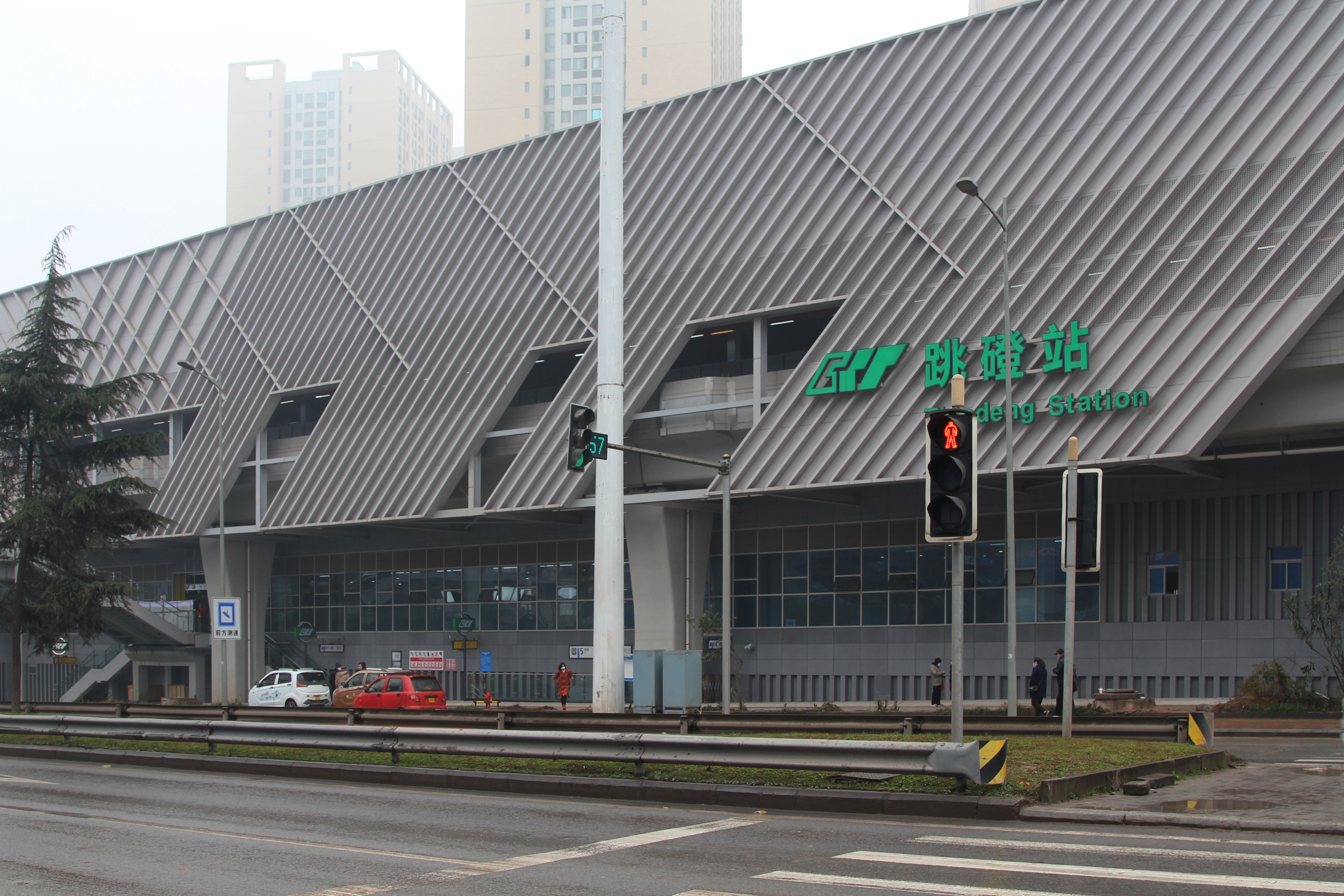

General information
- Location: Dadukou District, Chongqing; China
- Coordinates: 29.4109°N 106.4336°E
- Operated by: Chongqing Rail Transit Corp., Ltd
- Lines: Line 5 Line 18; Jiangtiao line
- Platforms: 4 (2 island platforms)

Construction
- Structure type: Elevated

Other information
- Station code: / / /

History
- Opened: 20 January 2021; 5 years ago (Line 5); 6 August 2022; 3 years ago (Jiangtiao line)

Services
Preceding station	Chongqing Rail Transit	Following station
Huayan Center towards Yuegangbeilu	Line 5	Terminus
Huayan Center towards Tangjiatuo	Line 5 Express	Terminus
Jin'aoshan towards Fuhualu	Line 18	Tiaodengnan Terminus
Terminus	Jiangtiao line	Shilinsi towards Shengquansi
Huayan Center towards Shiqiaopu via Tiaodeng	Jiangtiao line Thru. to Line 5	Shilinsi towards Shengquansi
Location

Tiaodeng station is an interchange station on Line 5, Line 18 and the Jiangtiao line of Chongqing Rail Transit in Chongqing municipality, China. It is located in Dadukou District and opened in 2021. This station serves as the southern terminus of Line 5 and the northern terminus of Jiangtiao line.

== Station structure ==
=== Line 5 and Jiangtiao line ===
Line 5 and Jiangtiao line form a cross-platform interchange. The two inner ones are used for Line 5 trains, while the other two outer ones are used for Jiangtiao line trains.

3F; Platforms	Jiangtiao line termination platform
3F; Platforms	Island platform
3F; Platforms	Line 5 to Yuegangbeilu (Huayan Center)
3F; Platforms	Line 5 termination platform
3F; Platforms	Island platform
3F; Platforms	Jiangtiao line to Shengquansi (Shilinsi)
2F; Concourse	Exits, Customer service, Vending machines, Toilets
1F	Exits

=== Line 18 Platforms ===
F2; Platforms	Line 18 to Fuhualu (Jin'aoshan)
F2; Platforms	Island platform
F2; Platforms	Line 18 to Tiaodengnan)
