= Yuegangbeilu station =

Metro station in Chongqing, China

Yuegangbeilu 悦港北路
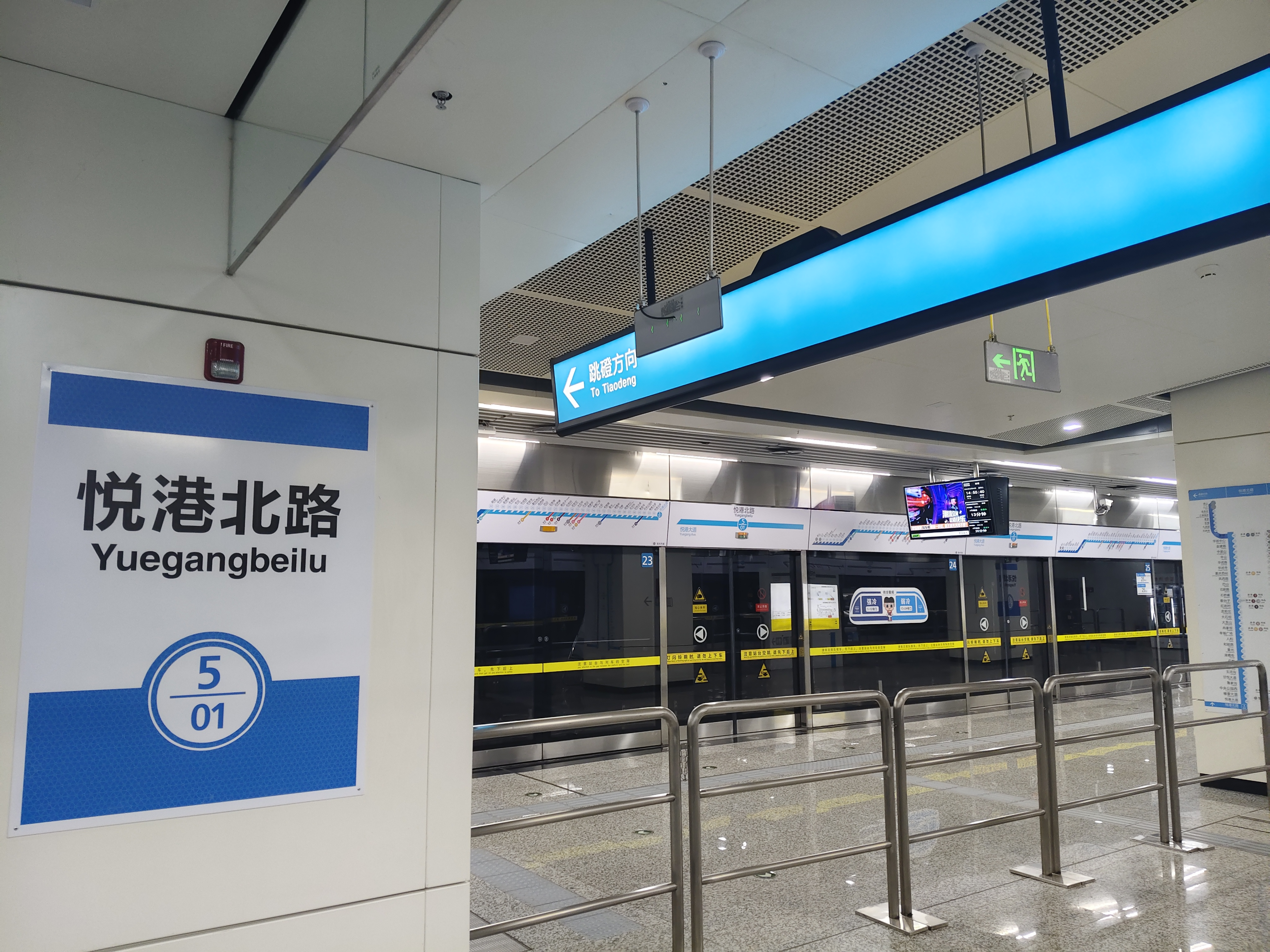
- Station platform

Chinese name
- Chinese: 悦港北路
- Hanyu Pinyin: Yuègǎng běi lù
- Literal meaning: 'Yuegang North Road'
Transcriptions
Standard Mandarin
- Hanyu Pinyin: Yuègǎng běi lù
- Wade–Giles: Yüeh^{4}-kang^{3} pei^{3} lu^{4}
- IPA: [ɥê.kǎŋ pèɪ lû]
Yue: Cantonese
- Yale Romanization: Yuhtgóng bāk louh
- Jyutping: jyut6 gong2 bak1 lou6
- IPA: [jyt̚˨.kɔŋ˧ pɐk̚˥ lɔw˨]

General information
- Location: Qiucheng Avenue & Yuegang North Road; Xiantao Subdistrict, Liangjiang New Area, Chongqing; China
- System: Chongqing Rail Transit
- Operator: Chongqing Rail Transit Corp., Ltd
- Line: Line 5
- Platforms: 1 island platform
- Tracks: 2

Construction
- Structure type: Underground
- Platform levels: 2

Other information
- Status: Operational
- Station code: /

History
- Opened: February 27, 2023

Services
Preceding station	Chongqing Rail Transit	Following station
Terminus	Line 5	Yuegang Ave. towards Tiaodeng
Location

Yuegangbeilu is a station on Line 5 of Chongqing Rail Transit in Chongqing Municipality, China. It is located in Xiantao Subdistrict, Liangjiang New Area, under the intersection of Qiucheng Avenue (秋成大道) and Yuegang North Road (悦港北路). It opened on 27 February 2023.

== Station structure ==
B1; Concourse	Exits, Customer service, Vending machines
B2; Platforms	Line 5 termination platform
B2; Platforms	Island platform
B2; Platforms	Line 5 to Tiaodeng (Yuegang Ave.)
