= Consumption Daily =

Chinese daily newspaper

- Native name: 消费日报
- Type: Daily newspaper
- Publisher: Consumption Daily Agency
- Founded: January 3, 1985
- Political alignment: Communism; Socialism with Chinese characteristics
- Language: Chinese
- Headquarters: Beijing, China
- OCLC number: 222431062
- Website: xfrb.com.cn

Consumption Daily (Chinese: 消费日报), also known as Xiaofei Ribao or Consumer Daily, is a national daily newspaper focusing on the areas of life and consumption published in the People's Republic of China. It is supervised and sponsored by the China National Light Industry Council. The paper was first published on January 3, 1985, and its predecessor was China Light Industry News (中国轻工业报).

== Controversies ==
In 2012, Yuan Renguo, former chairman of Kweichow Moutai was exposed as holding a press pass from Consumption Daily by some Chinese language media. After the incident, the press cards of Yuan Renguo and others were cancelled. The Consumption Daily explained that Yuan Ringuo had been a special correspondent for the newspaper many years ago.
