= Zunyi Maotai Airport =

Airport in Renhuai, Guizhou, China

Zunyi Maotai Airport 遵义茅台机场
- IATA: WMT; ICAO: ZUMT

Summary
- Airport type: Public
- Serves: Zunyi
- Location: Yinshui Village, Gaodaping Town, Renhuai, Guizhou, China
- Opened: 31 October 2017; 8 years ago
- Elevation AMSL: 1,240 m (4,070 ft)
- Coordinates: 27°58′05″N 106°26′20″E

Map
- Location of airport in Guizhou

Runways
| Direction | Length | | Surface |
| Direction | m | ft | Surface |
|---|---|---|---|
| 17/35 | 2,600 | 8,530 |

Statistics (2025)
- Passengers: 1,221,929
- Aircraft movements: 13,030
- Cargo (metric tons): 2,354.0

Zunyi Maotai Airport
- Simplified Chinese: 遵义茅台机场
- Traditional Chinese: 遵義茅台機場
Transcriptions
Standard Mandarin
- Hanyu Pinyin: Zūnyì Máotái Jīchǎng

Zunyi Maotai Airport (IATA: WMT, ICAO: ZUMT) is an airport in Renhuai city, which is under the administration of the prefecture-level city of Zunyi in Guizhou Province, China. It is located in Yinshui Village, Gaodaping Town, 16 kilometres (9.9 mi) from downtown Renhuai. The airport is named after the famous Maotai liquor produced in the nearby town of the same name. It is the second airport in Zunyi, after Zunyi Xinzhou Airport.

== History ==
On December 29, 1999, Fu Chuanyao, the mayor of Zunyi Municipal People's Government, first proposed the topic of "building the Renhuai Maotai branch airport" when he attended the provincial governor's office meeting. It was later supported by the Guizhou Provincial Committee of the Chinese Communist Party and the Guizhou Provincial People's Government. Qian Yunlu, the governor of Guizhou Province, made it clear: "Zunyi Maotai branch airport will be proposed by Zunyi City based on the needs of the city's economic and social development, in conjunction with relevant experts, after a comprehensive demonstration, and then submitted according to procedures." In December 1999, the preliminary application work for the Renhuai Maotai Airport project was launched.

In January 2000, Zunyi City and Renhuai City established the Maotai Airport Leading Group to carry out preliminary work and the site was chosen in 2003. In September 2005, the design unit completed the airport's "Preliminary Feasibility Study Report", which was submitted by the Zunyi Municipal People's Government to the Guizhou Provincial People's Government in October of the same year, and then forwarded to the State Council and the Central Military Commission. Subsequently, the Chengdu Military Region Air Force of the Chinese People's Liberation Army agreed to build a new Maotai civil airport, and the Civil Aviation Administration of China approved the Yinshui site as the site of Maotai Airport. As a result, Zunyi Maotai Airport was included in the national civil airport planning layout and was included in the national "Eleventh Five-Year Plan" construction projects. However, due to the adjustment of the branch airport layout plan and the impact of county economic development, Maotai Airport was removed from the list of 244 airports planned for construction nationwide and 64 airports to be newly built during the national "Twelfth Five-Year Plan" period. The Maotai Airport construction project was shelved from then on. It was not until 2011 that the project began to see the light of day.

In April 2011, Li Zhanshu, then Secretary of the Guizhou Provincial Party Committee, and Zhao Kezhi, then Governor of Guizhou Province, inspected Renhuai and convened a special meeting to support the accelerated development of the Maotai Distillery, deciding to restart the application process for the Renhuai Maotai Airport. Subsequently, the Zunyi and Renhuai municipal party committees and governments established an airport construction leading group to carry out relevant application and construction work. At the end of December, the airport expressway project commenced construction.

In 2012, the Guizhou Provincial People's Government submitted a request for approval of the construction of Renhuai Moutai Airport to the State Council and the Central Military Commission, and the site selection was re-approved. The Air Force of the Chengdu Military Region and the Civil Aviation Southwest Regional Administration also agreed with the recommended site for the Renhuai Moutai Civil Airport. On May 4, 2012, the National Development and Reform Commission commissioned China International Engineering Consulting Company to comprehensively evaluate and pass the "Guizhou Renhuai Moutai Airport Pre-Feasibility Study Report". Moutai Group and the Renhuai Municipal People's Government jointly invested 110 million yuan in a ratio of 7:3 to start the construction of the airport expressway. Moutai Group and the Renhuai Municipal People's Government jointly invested 200 million yuan in a ratio of 7:3 to establish Moutai Airport Co., Ltd., which is fully responsible for the on-site construction tasks and preliminary work of the airport.

In January 2013, the State Council and the Central Military Commission officially approved the construction of the new Renhuai Civil Airport in Guizhou. With the full support of the central, provincial, and municipal governments and departments, ten key documents were successively completed, including the feasibility study and evaluation report of the Renhuai Airport project by China International Engineering Consulting Corporation, the land pre-approval by the Ministry of Land and Resources, the environmental impact assessment approval by the Ministry of Environmental Protection, the energy conservation registration and filing by the National Development and Reform Commission, the bidding plan by the Provincial Development and Reform Commission, and the site selection opinion by the Provincial Department of Housing and Urban-Rural Development.

In October 2014, the National Development and Reform Commission approved the feasibility study report for the Renhuai Airport project. In 2014, the Southwest Regional Administration of Civil Aviation and the Guizhou Provincial Development and Reform Commission jointly approved the overall plan, preliminary design and budget of the Guizhou Renhuai Civil Airport with documents No. 276 and No. 316 of the Southwest Regional Administration of Civil Aviation. In December 2014, the Chengdu Military Region Air Force approved the airspace plan for Renhuai Airport.

In March 2015, the earthwork and foundation treatment projects in the flight area of Renhuai Moutai Airport and the off-site airport connection road projects were fully started. By the end of the year, fixed asset investment of 823 million yuan had been completed, with a total investment of 1.283 billion yuan.

On August 31, 2017, the construction of Zunyi Maotai Airport was completed. After five years of construction, Zunyi Maotai Airport has a 2,600-meter runway, a 3,100-square-meter apron, a 15,000-square-meter terminal building, and four parking stands. It is equipped with supporting facilities such as fuel supply, water supply, power supply, heating, ventilation, meteorology, communication and navigation, and auxiliary production facilities. On October 31, 2017, Zunyi Maotai Airport officially opened to traffic. A Boeing aircraft from Beijing landed at Zunyi Maotai Airport, which was the first passenger aircraft of Zunyi Maotai Airport. At the same time, the first VIP lounge for military personnel to wait at an airport in the country was also opened to the public at Zunyi Maotai Airport. Flights to Chengdu, Haikou, Beijing, Tianjin and other cities took off and landed on the same day. Flights to Shanghai, Sanya, Zhengzhou, Changsha, Jinan and Guiyang were opened from November 1, 2017. In the future, Zunyi Maotai Airport will strive to open some international flights.

On December 29, 2018, the annual passenger throughput of Maotai Airport exceeded 1 million, becoming the first regional airport in the history of China's civil aviation to achieve a passenger volume of more than one million in its first year of operation. On November 28, 2019, the annual passenger throughput of Maotai Airport exceeded 1.5 million.

== Facilities ==
The airport has a runway that is 2,600 meters long and 45 meters wide (class 4C), a 15,000-square-meter terminal building, and 4 aircraft parking aprons.

== Airlines and destinations ==
| Airlines | Destinations |
|---|---|
| Air China | Beijing–Capital |
| China Eastern Airlines | Shanghai–Pudong |
| China Express Airlines | Chongqing, Guiyang, Yichang, Zhanjiang |
| China Southern Airlines | Guangzhou, Shenzhen |
| Lucky Air | Dali, Ningbo, Shijiazhuang, Xishuangbanna |
| Tianjin Airlines | Haikou, Xi'an |
| West Air | Lhasa, Lijiang, Zhengzhou |
| XiamenAir | Dalian, Hangzhou, Quanzhou, Wuhan, Xiamen |

== See also ==
- List of airports in China
- List of the busiest airports in China
