= Chishui City =

Chishui 赤水市
- County-level city
- Location of the city center in Guizhou Chishui (Southwest China)
- Coordinates (Chishui municipal government): 28°35′25″N 105°41′51″E
- Country: China
- Province: Guizhou
- Prefecture-level city: Zunyi
- Municipal seat: Shizhong

Area
  - Total: 1,882.57 km^{2} (726.86 sq mi)

Population (2020)
  - Total: 247,287
  - Density: 131.356/km^{2} (340.211/sq mi)
- Time zone: UTC+8 (China Standard)

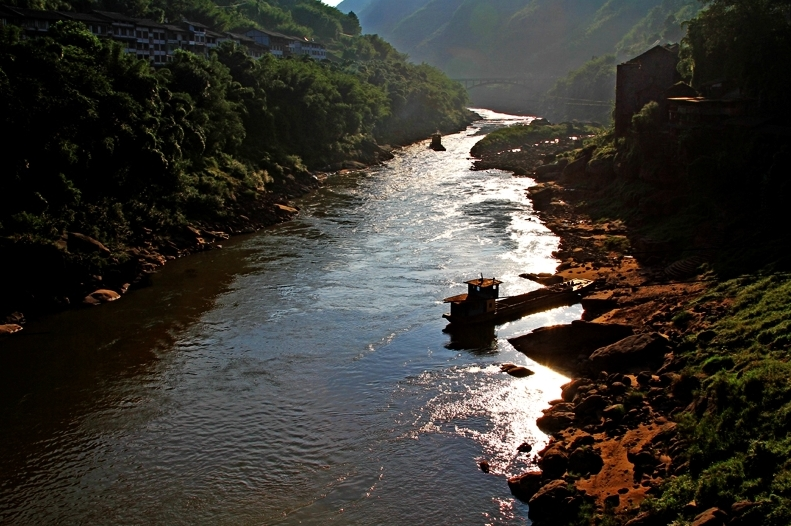
Chishui river in Guizhou, China.

Chishui (Chinese: 赤水; pinyin: Chìshǔi) is a county-level city of Guizhou Province, China, bordering Sichuan to the north and west. It is under the administration of the prefecture-level city of Zunyi.

The city has a total area of 1,801 km^{2}, and in 2020, it had a population of 247,287.

Chishui is famous for its bamboo forestry, the city has around 87,000 hectares (340 sq mi) of bamboo forest coverage. The bamboo is used for paper production and bamboo weaving among others.

In 1935 the Battle of Chishui River took place in the city.

== Administrative divisions ==
Chishui is divided into 3 subdistricts, 11 towns and 3 townships:

subdistricts

- Shizhong 市中街道
- Wenhua 文华街道
- Jinhua 金华街道

towns

- Tiantai 天台镇
- Fuxing 复兴镇
- Datong 大同镇
- Wanglong 旺隆镇
- Hushi 葫市镇
- Yuanhou 元厚镇
- Guandu 官渡镇
- Changqi 长期镇
- Changsha 长沙镇
- Lianghekou 两河口镇
- Bing'an 丙安镇

townships

- Baoyuan 宝源乡
- Shibao 石堡乡
- Baiyun 白云乡

== Climate ==
Climate data for Chishui, elevation 355 m (1,165 ft), (1991–2020 normals, extremes 1991–present)
| Month | Jan | Feb | Mar | Apr | May | Jun | Jul | Aug | Sep | Oct | Nov | Dec | Year |
|---|---|---|---|---|---|---|---|---|---|---|---|---|---|
| Record high °C (°F) | 19.3 (66.7) | 24.8 (76.6) | 35.2 (95.4) | 37.2 (99.0) | 40.4 (104.7) | 39.1 (102.4) | 41.8 (107.2) | 43.5 (110.3) | 42.1 (107.8) | 34.6 (94.3) | 27.2 (81.0) | 19.2 (66.6) | 43.5 (110.3) |
| Mean daily maximum °C (°F) | 10.5 (50.9) | 13.6 (56.5) | 18.5 (65.3) | 24.0 (75.2) | 27.1 (80.8) | 29.0 (84.2) | 32.7 (90.9) | 32.9 (91.2) | 27.8 (82.0) | 21.5 (70.7) | 17.2 (63.0) | 11.6 (52.9) | 22.2 (72.0) |
| Daily mean °C (°F) | 7.8 (46.0) | 10.2 (50.4) | 14.3 (57.7) | 19.0 (66.2) | 22.1 (71.8) | 24.5 (76.1) | 27.5 (81.5) | 27.4 (81.3) | 23.4 (74.1) | 18.3 (64.9) | 14.0 (57.2) | 9.2 (48.6) | 18.1 (64.7) |
| Mean daily minimum °C (°F) | 6.1 (43.0) | 7.9 (46.2) | 11.3 (52.3) | 15.5 (59.9) | 18.6 (65.5) | 21.3 (70.3) | 23.7 (74.7) | 23.5 (74.3) | 20.4 (68.7) | 16.2 (61.2) | 11.9 (53.4) | 7.5 (45.5) | 15.3 (59.6) |
| Record low °C (°F) | −0.7 (30.7) | −0.4 (31.3) | 3.4 (38.1) | 6.4 (43.5) | 9.8 (49.6) | 15.0 (59.0) | 17.8 (64.0) | 18.1 (64.6) | 13.5 (56.3) | 8.8 (47.8) | 2.8 (37.0) | −1.2 (29.8) | −1.2 (29.8) |
| Average precipitation mm (inches) | 35.9 (1.41) | 28.9 (1.14) | 55.2 (2.17) | 93.1 (3.67) | 145.3 (5.72) | 196.2 (7.72) | 186.0 (7.32) | 158.7 (6.25) | 126.6 (4.98) | 102.3 (4.03) | 52.5 (2.07) | 39.0 (1.54) | 1,219.7 (48.02) |
| Average precipitation days (≥ 0.1 mm) | 15.3 | 11.9 | 14.4 | 14.3 | 16.7 | 17.8 | 14.1 | 12.7 | 15.0 | 18.7 | 14.6 | 14.5 | 180 |
| Average snowy days | 0.3 | 0 | 0 | 0 | 0 | 0 | 0 | 0 | 0 | 0 | 0 | 0.1 | 0.4 |
| Average relative humidity (%) | 87 | 83 | 80 | 78 | 79 | 83 | 79 | 77 | 83 | 88 | 87 | 88 | 83 |
| Mean monthly sunshine hours | 33.0 | 47.0 | 87.1 | 121.7 | 126.2 | 111.0 | 190.2 | 192.2 | 112.9 | 59.2 | 56.2 | 35.6 | 1,172.3 |
| Percentage possible sunshine | 10 | 15 | 23 | 31 | 30 | 27 | 45 | 48 | 31 | 17 | 18 | 11 | 26 |
Source: China Meteorological Administrationall-time extreme temperatureall-time July high
