= Zhang Deqin =

Chinese politician

- 张德芹

Chairman of the Board of Kweichow Moutai
- In office 29 April 2024 – October 2025
- Preceded by: Ding Xiongjun
- Succeeded by: Chen Hua

Chairman of Guizhou Xijiu Investment Holding Group Co., Ltd.
- In office July 2022 – April 2024
- Preceded by: Zhong Fangda
- Succeeded by: Wang Diqiang (汪地强)

Chairman of Guizhou Xijiu Co., Ltd.
- In office May 2010 – August 2018
- Preceded by: New title
- Succeeded by: Position revoked

Personal details
- Born: September 1972 (age 54) Renhuai, Guizhou, China
- Party: Chinese Communist Party
- Education: Guizhou University

Chinese name
- Simplified Chinese: 张德芹
- Traditional Chinese: 張德芹
Transcriptions
Standard Mandarin
- Hanyu Pinyin: Zhāng Déqín

Zhang Deqin (Chinese: 张德芹; born September 1972) is a Chinese executive and politician, currently serving as deputy party secretary of the Guizhou Federation of Industry and Commerce. He was a delegate to the 13th National People's Congress and a member of the 13th Guizhou Provincial Committee of the Chinese People's Political Consultative Conference.

== Early life and education ==
Zhang was born in Renhuai, Guizhou, in September 1972. In 1991, he entered Guizhou Institute of Technology (now Guizhou University), where he majored in fermentation engineering.

== Career ==
After graduating in 1995, Zhang became a technician at Kweichow Moutai. There, he was in turn director of the No.2 Wine Making Workshop, assistant to the general manager, and finally deputy general manager. He also served as general manager, chairman and party secretary of Guizhou Xijiu Co., Ltd. between 2010 and 2018.

Zhang was deputy general manager of Guizhou Modern Logistics Industry (Group) Co., Ltd. in June 2019 and subsequently chairman and party secretary of Guizhou Xijiu Investment Holding Group Co., Ltd. in July 2022.

On 29 April 2024, Zhang was proposed as chairman and party secretary of the Board of Kweichow Moutai.

On 5 December 2025, Zhang was appointed as deputy party secretary of the Guizhou Federation of Industry and Commerce.

Business positions
New title	Chairman of Guizhou Xijiu Co., Ltd. 2010–2018	Succeeded by Position revoked
Preceded by Zhong Fangda	Chairman of Guizhou Xijiu Investment Holding Group Co., Ltd. 2022–2024	Succeeded by Wang Diqiang (汪地强)
Preceded by Ding Xiongjun	Chairman of the Board of Kweichow Moutai; 2024–2025	Succeeded by Chen Hua (陈华)
