= Gao Weidong =

Chinese business executive and politician

- 高卫东

Director of Guizhou Coalfield Geology Bureau
- In office August 2021 – May 2022
- Preceded by: Gao Di
- Succeeded by: TBA

Chairman of the Board of Kweichow Moutai
- In office March 2020 – August 2021
- Preceded by: Li Baofang
- Succeeded by: Ding Xiongjun

Director of Guizhou Provincial Transportation Department
- In office January 2018 – March 2020
- Preceded by: Wang Bingqing
- Succeeded by: Shao Xun

Personal details
- Born: November 1972 (age 53) Dengzhou, Henan, China
- Party: Chinese Communist Party (1997-2022, expelled)
- Education: Guizhou Institute of Technology

Chinese name
- Simplified Chinese: 高卫东
- Traditional Chinese: 高衛東
Transcriptions
Standard Mandarin
- Hanyu Pinyin: Gāo Wèidōng

Gao Weidong (Chinese: 高卫东; born November 1972) is a Chinese business executive and politician who served as chairman of the Board of Kweichow Moutai from 2020 to 2021. As of May 2022 he was under investigation by China's top anti-corruption agency. He is a delegate to the 13th National People's Congress.

== Biography ==
Gao was born in Dengzhou, Henan, in November 1972. In 1990, he entered Guizhou Institute of Technology (now Guizhou University), majoring in industrial and civilian buildings. After graduating in 1993, he was despatched to Guiyang Economic and Technological Development Zone as an official in the Environmental Protection Bureau. He joined the Chinese Communist Party (CCP) in December 1997. He was appointed deputy governor of Xiaohe District in October 2000, concurrently serving as deputy director of the Management Committee of Guiyang Economic and Technological Development Zone.

He was party secretary and chairman of Jinyang New Area Development and Construction Co., Ltd. in September 2006 and Jinyang Construction Investment (Group) Co., Ltd. in March 2009.

He became director of Guiyang Transportation Bureau in January 2010, but having held the position for only two years. He was promoted to vice mayor of Guiyang in February 2012, concurrently serving as deputy director and then director of Gui'an New Area Management Committee. In February 2017, he became the deputy director of Guizhou Provincial Transportation Department, rising to director the next year. In March 2020, he was made chairman of the Board of Kweichow Moutai, a position he held for a year and a half. In August 2021, he took office as director of Guizhou Coalfield Geology Bureau.

=== Downfall ===
On 13 May 2022, he was put under investigation for alleged "serious violations of discipline and laws" by the Central Commission for Discipline Inspection (CCDI), the party's internal disciplinary body, and the National Supervisory Commission, the highest anti-corruption agency of China. Yuan Renguo, another former chairman of the Board of Moutai, was also sacked for graft. Gao was expelled from the party and dismissed from the public office on 14 November 2022.

On 2 February 2024, Gao was sentenced to life in prison for bribery.

Government offices
Preceded by Wang Bingqing	Director of Guizhou Provincial Transportation Department; 2018–2020	Succeeded by Shao Xun
Preceded by Gao Di (高弟)	Director of Guizhou Coalfield Geology Bureau; 2021–2022	Succeeded by TBA
Business positions
Preceded by Li Baofang (李保芳)	Chairman of the Board of Kweichow Moutai; 2020–2021	Succeeded by Ding Xiongjun
