= Yuan Renguo =

Chinese business executive and politician (1956–2023)

- 袁仁国

Chairman of the Board of Maotai
- In office December 2000 – May 2018
- Preceded by: Ji Keliang
- Succeeded by: Li Baofang

Personal details
- Born: 1 October 1956 Renhuai County, Guizhou, China
- Died: 9 September 2023 (aged 66) Guiyang, Guizhou, China
- Party: Chinese Communist Party (1982–2019; expelled)
- Education: Central Party School of the Chinese Communist Party

Chinese name
- Simplified Chinese: 袁仁国
- Traditional Chinese: 袁仁國
Transcriptions
Standard Mandarin
- Hanyu Pinyin: Yuán Rénguó

Yuan Renguo (Chinese: 袁仁国; 1 October 1956 – 9 September 2023) was a Chinese business executive and politician who served as chairman of the Board of Maotai from 2000 to 2018. As of May 2019 he was under investigation by the People's Republic of China's top anti-corruption agency. He entered the workforce in April 1974, and joined the Chinese Communist Party (CCP) in July 1982. He was a delegate to the 10th and 12th National People's Congress. He was a representative of the 17th National Congress of the Chinese Communist Party.

== Biography ==
Yuan was born in Renhuai County, Guizhou, on 1 October 1956.

Yuan joined Maotai in 1975, where he assumed various posts, including secretary, director of the Office, workshop director, and assistant director. He was named a deputy general manager in January 1997. He moved up the ranks to become general manager in April 1998 and chairman of the board in December 2000.

On 6 January 2017, he was made a deputy director of the Financial and Economic Committee of the Guizhou Provincial Committee of the Chinese People's Political Consultative Conference. He was discharged from that position in May 2019.

=== Downfall ===
On 22 May 2019, Yuan was placed under investigation for "serious violations of laws and regulations" by the Central Commission for Discipline Inspection (CCDI), the party's internal disciplinary body, and the National Supervisory Commission, the highest anti-corruption agency of the People's Republic of China. He was expelled from the CCP and removed from public office. He was taken away on 23 May. On 27 June, he was indicted on suspicion of accepting bribes. On 6 September, the Intermediate People's Court of Guiyang held a public hearing of Yuan's bribery case.

On 23 September 2021, he was sentenced to life imprisonment by the Intermediate People's Court of Guiyang. He was also deprived of his political rights for life, and ordered by the court to have all his personal assets confiscated and turn over all illicit gains and their interests to the national treasury. He was found guilty of receiving bribes of 110 million yuan (US$16.2 million). Gao Weidong, another former chairman of the Board of Maotai, was also sacked for graft in May 2022.

=== Death ===
Yuan was hospitalized on 20 August 2023, and died, following a cerebral hemorrhage, on 9 September 2023, at the age of 66.

Business positions
Preceded by Ji Keliang	Chairman of the Board of Maotai; 2000–2018	Succeeded by Li Baofang
