= Ding Xiongjun =

Chinese politician

- 丁雄军

Director of Guizhou Provincial Administration for Market Regulation
- In office 30 April 2024 – 2 January 2025
- Preceded by: Yang Xiangdong

Chairman of the Board of Kweichow Moutai
- In office 30 August 2021 – 30 April 2024
- Preceded by: Gao Weidong
- Succeeded by: Zhang Deqin

Personal details
- Born: August 1974 (age 51) Chongyang County, Hubei, China
- Party: Chinese Communist Party
- Education: Wuhan University; Central Party School of the Chinese Communist Party

Chinese name
- Simplified Chinese: 丁雄军
- Traditional Chinese: 丁雄軍
Transcriptions
Standard Mandarin
- Hanyu Pinyin: Dīng Xióngjūn

Ding Xiongjun (Chinese: 丁雄军; born August 1974) is a Chinese executive and politician who is the current director of Guizhou Provincial Administration for Market Regulation. He previously served as chairman of the Board of Kweichow Moutai between 2021 and 2024. He is a delegate to the 14th National People's Congress. He is a representative of the 20th National Congress of the Chinese Communist Party.

== Early life and education ==
Ding was born in Chongyang County, Hubei, in August 1974. In 1991, he entered Wuhan University, where he majored in macromolecule. He joined the Chinese Communist Party (CCP) in June 1994.

== Career ==
After graduating in 2001, Ding became deputy director of the Science and Technology Bureau of Xiaohe District in Guiyang, capital of southwest China's Guizhou province. He was director of the Economic and Trade Bureau of Xiaohe District in February 2002, in addition to serving as assistant director of the Management Committee of Guiyang Economic and Technological Development Zone. He served as deputy governor of Xiaohe District and deputy director of the Management Committee of Guiyang Economic and Technological Development Zone which he held only from December 2004 to September 2006, although he remained director of the Economic and Trade Bureau of Xiaohe District until September 2006.

Ding was vice mayor of Qingzhen in September 2006 and subsequently director and party secretary of the Guiyang Two Lakes and One Warehouse Management Bureau in November 2007.

In November 2009, Ding became secretary-general of Guiyang Municipal People's Government, a post he kept until September 2012, when he was appointed party secretary of Guiyang National High-tech Industrial Development Zone and party secretary of Baiyun District.

In November 2013, Ding took office as deputy secretary-general of the Guizhou Provincial People's Government, a position he held for nearly three years.

Ding was admitted to member of the CCP Bijie Municipal Committee, the city's top authority, and was appointed vice mayor the next month.

In October 2018, Ding was chosen as director of Guizhou Provincial Energy Bureau, and served until August 2021.

Ding was proposed as chairman of the Board of Kweichow Moutai in August 2021, concurrently serving as party secretary.

In April 2024, Ding took up the post of director of Guizhou Provincial Administration for Market Regulation.

== Investigation ==
On 2 January 2025, Ding hwas suspected of "serious violations of laws and regulations" by the Central Commission for Discipline Inspection (CCDI), the party's internal disciplinary body, and the National Supervisory Commission, the highest anti-corruption agency of China.

Business positions
Preceded by Gao Weidong	Chairman of the Board of Kweichow Moutai; 2021–2024	Succeeded by Zhang Deqin
Government offices
Preceded by Yang Xiangdong	Director of Guizhou Provincial Administration for Market Regulation; 2024–2025	Succeeded by TBA
