= Battle of Chishui River =

1935 battle of the Chinese Civil War

- Part of the Chinese Civil War and the Long March
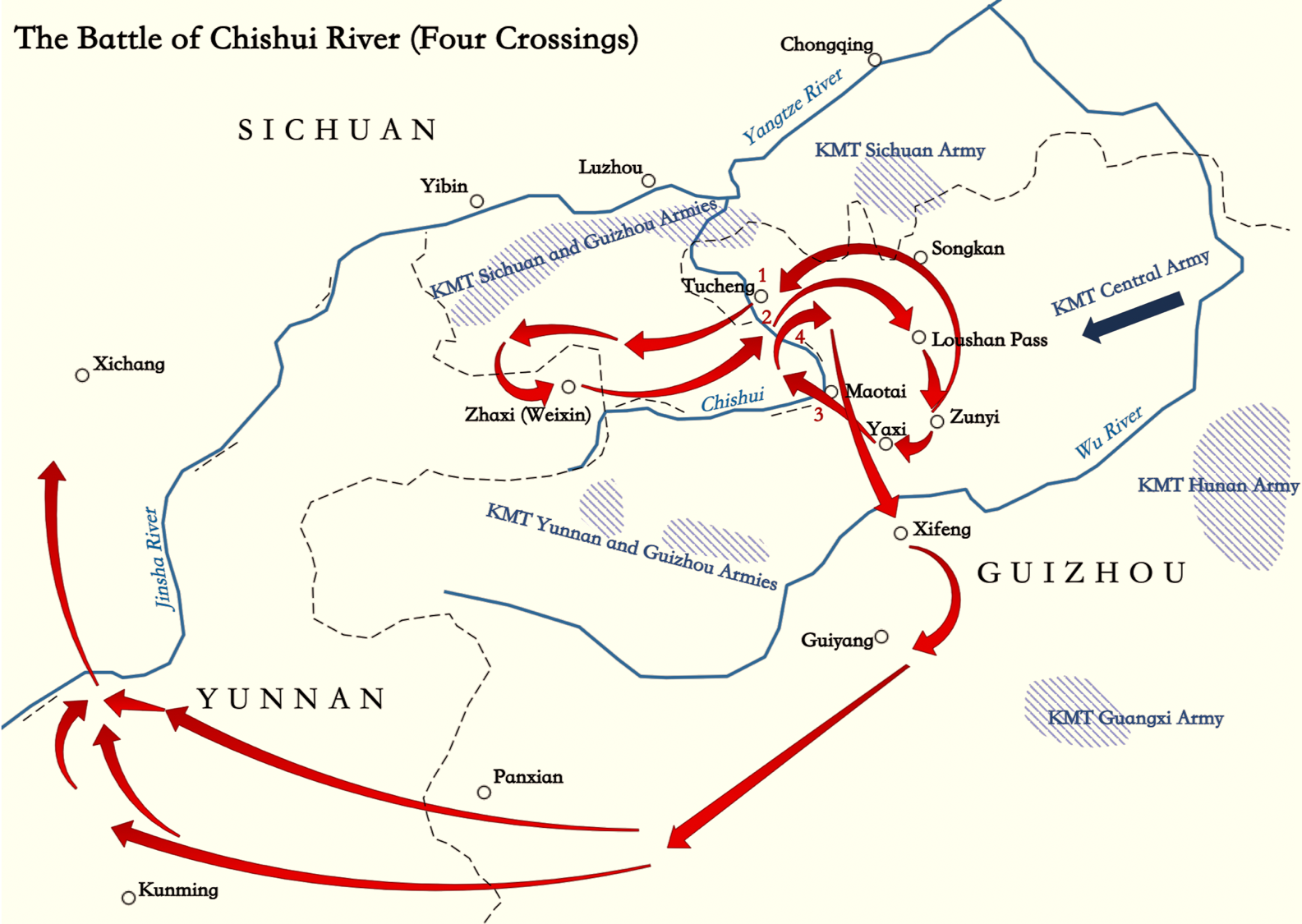
Date	19 January 1935 – 22 March 1935
Location	Chishui River, China
Result	Communist forces manage to maneuver out of the Nationalists' encirclement

Belligerents
Republic of China (Nationalists): National Revolutionary Army; Local warlords	Chinese Soviet Republic (Communists): Chinese Red Army

Commanders and leaders
Chiang Kai-shek; Xue Yue; Liu Xiang; He Jian; Wang Jialie; Long Yun; Bai Chongxi; Lu Daoyuan; Guo Xunqi; Wu Qiwei; Sun Du; Zhou Hunyuan	Mao Zedong; Zhu De; Zhou Enlai; Zhang Wentian; Wang Jiaxiang; Peng Dehuai; Liu Bocheng; Lin Biao; Nie Rongzhen; Chen Geng; Song Renqiong; Wang Yaonan

Strength
400,000	30,000

Casualties and losses
30,000 casualties 3,600 captured	Unknown

The Battle of Chishui River (simplified Chinese: 赤水战役; traditional Chinese: 赤水戰役), popularly known in mainland China as the Four Crossings of the Chishui River or "Crossing the Chishui River Four Times" (四渡赤水), was a major battle between the Chinese Communist Party (CCP) and the Chinese Nationalist Party (KMT) in 1935. It was the first major battle commanded by Mao Zedong during the Long March, and it is regarded as one of the most representative battles under Mao's command. This battle was a turning point in the first phase of Chinese Civil War. The Chinese Red Army jumped out of the encirclement of Kuomintang by unexpectedly crossing the Chishui River four times, and eventually survived the anti-communist military campaign of Chiang Kai-shek.

== Timeline ==
In January 1935, during the CCP's Zunyi Conference, Mao Zedong obtained the supreme military leadership of the Chinese Red Army. Aiming to meet the other branch of Red Army led by Zhang Guotao and Xu Xiangqian in Sichuan, Mao's Red Army left Zunyi on January 19 and moved northward. The Sichuan warlord Liu Xiang sent his troops to Songkan and Tucheng and managed to stop the vanguard of Red Army (the 1st Legion of Red Army led by Lin Biao and Nie Rongzhen). Knowing that the reinforcements of KMT army were approaching, Mao abandoned the original plan and then ordered the army to move westward. Zhu De, Chen Geng and Song Renqiong successfully covered the flank of Mao's main force and stopped the Sichuan KMT army at Tucheng. On January 29, the Red Army crossed over the Chishui River near Tucheng and continued marching west to enter Weixin County in northeastern Yunnan. When Mao learned that Chiang Kai-shek sent more troops from Sichuan, Guizhou, and Yunnan to Red Army's flanks, he turned eastward on February 18 and crossed over the Chishui River again at Taiping Ferry and Erlang Beach on February 21. The Red Army entered the northern Guizhou again. Peng Dehuai and Yang Shangkun led the 3rd Legion of Red Army marched south and occupied the Loushan Pass after the local KMT troops were mostly sent westward to the other side of the Chishui River. Deng Ping, the Chief of Staff in the 3rd Legion, was killed in action near Loushan Pass, and Ye Jianying took his commanding role. From March 16 to March 17, the Red Army crossed over Chishui River near Maotai for the third time, attempting to find a chance to cross the Yangtze River to the north. Chiang Kai-shek, again, ordered his troops to encircle the Red Army in the area between the Chishui and Yangtze Rivers. Mao sent out a regiment for a feigned attack and pinned the majority of KMT armies near the Yangtze River, and then had a sharp turn towards the Chishui River again with the main force. The Red Army crossed the Chishui River for the 4th time on March 22 at Taiping Ferry and then marched towards Guiyang. Until now, Mao's Red Army had successfully avoided the encirclement.

== Aftermath ==
On March 24, Chiang Kai-shek, Chen Cheng and Yan Daogang arrived at Guiyang and established a temporary military commanding center in this city. At the same time, Mao Zedong and Zhu De launched a feigned attack towards the east. Chiang Kai-shek and Xue Yue thought that Mao's men were trying to march back to western Hunan Province in order to meet with another branch of Red Army led by He Long and Xiao Ke, so they ordered KMT troops to assemble in northern Guizhou to stop the Red Army. However, the main force of the Red Army stealthily moved south. When Chiang realized the real move of Mao, the vanguard of Red Army led by Xiao Hua had already crossed the Wu River and approached the defenseless Guiyang. On April 2, while a group of Red Army was attacking Xifeng (the northern gateway of Guiyang), the main force of Red Army marched towards the Guiyang airport. Chiang Kai-shek was in shock. In order to defend the airport so that he could evacuate the KMT leadership group, Chiang dispatched Sun Du's troop, based in Dading, to reinforce Guiyang, leaving a wide-open path for Red Army to enter the northern Yunnan. On April 8, after Sun Du arrived at the Guiyang airport, Mao Zedong led the Red Army to rapidly march west and entered Yunnan on April 24. There, they would successfully cross the Jinsha River (the upper section of Yangtze River) and move north, and would eventually meet with Zhang Guotao's branch of Red Army in Sichuan, and other branches of Red Army in Shaanxi.

== Strengths ==
=== The Communists ===
The Chinese Red Army suffered a significant number of casualties during the Battle of Xiang River in 1934. When they left Ruijin and started the Long March, they had 80,000 troops as well as heavy weapons. After they crossed the Xiang River, however, only about 30,000 men left, and they lost almost all heavy weapons. The group of leadership of the party was basically unharmed after the Battle of Xiang River. After the Zunyi Conference, Mao Zedong replaced Bo Gu and Otto Braun as the chief commander of the army, and then started the Battle of Chishui River. In addition to Mao, Zhou Enlai, Wang Jiaxiang and Zhang Wentian played critical roles in the party and military leadership during this battle, while 7 out of the future Ten Marshals took part in this battle as legion or division leaders of the Red Army. Other notable figures took part in this battle include Liu Shaoqi and Deng Xiaoping.

- Mao Zedong: chairman of the military commission
- Zhu De: commander in chief
- Zhou Enlai: chief political commissar
- Liu Bocheng: chief of the general staff
- Ye Jianying: chief of the general staff
- Wang Jiaxiang: director of politics
- Zhang Yunyi: deputy chief of the general staff
- Luo Ronghuan: general political inspector
- Yang Shangkun: director of the political department
- Lin Biao: commander of 1st Legion
- Nie Rongzhen: political commissar of the 1st Legion
- Peng Dehuai: commander of 3rd Legion
- Yang Shangkun: political commissar of the 3rd Legion
- Deng Ping: chief of staff of the 3rd Legion
- Chen Geng: commander of the CMC Cadres Group
- Song Renqiong: political commissar of the CMC Cadres Group

=== Kuomintang ===
Chiang Kai-shek assembled more than 400,000 men to encircle and suppress the Red Army in this battle. His troops were equipped with heavy weapons and bombers. Chiang's subordinate Xue Yue led eight divisions of the National Revolutionary Army as the "Central Army", while local warlords of southwestern provinces, who nominally regard Chiang as the sole rightful leader of China, also sent out their troops to fight communists. In Chiang's proposal, Xue Yue's Central Army would crack down the communists, and then they would take this chance to also suppress the warlords and actually unify the southwestern provinces.

- Chiang Kai-shek's Central Army: 8 divisions led by Xue Yue, Zhou Hunyuan and Wu Qiwei
- Liu Xiang's Sichuan Army: 12 brigades
- Bai Chongxi's Guangxi Army: 3 divisions
- Long Yun's Yunnan Army: 3 brigades
- Wang Jialie's Guizhou Army: 3 divisions
- He Jian's Hunan Army: 3 divisions

== See also ==
- Outline of the Chinese Civil War
