= Yelang, Guizhou =

Yelang 夜郎镇
- Town
- Location in China
- Coordinates: 28°024′06″N 106°47′08″E
- Country: People's Republic of China
- Province: Guizhou
- Prefecture-level city: Zunyi
- County: Tongzi
- Time zone: UTC+8 (China Standard)

Yelang (Chinese: 夜郎; pinyin: Yèláng) is a town in Tongzi County located to the north of the downtown Tongzi, Zunyi, Guizhou, People's Republic of China.

== Transportation ==
- Chongqing–Guiyang high-speed railway
- Sichuan–Guizhou railway

== See also ==
- List of township-level divisions of Guizhou
