= Sanhe, Renhuai =

Sanhe 三合镇
- Town
- Location relative to Sichuan
- Coordinates: 28°04′43″N 106°21′01″E
- Country: People's Republic of China
- Province: Guizhou
- Prefecture-level city: Zunyi
- County-level city: Renhuai
- Village-level divisions: 1 residential community 8 villages
- Elevation: 910 m (2,990 ft)
- Time zone: UTC+8 (China Standard)
- Area code: 0832

Sanhe (Chinese: 三合; pinyin: Sānhé) is a town under the administration of Renhuai City in northern Guizhou, People's Republic of China, located 32 kilometres (20 mi) north-northwest of downtown Renhuai and 8.6 km (5.3 mi) east of the border with Sichuan. As of 2018, it has one residential community (社区) and 8 villages under its administration.

== See also ==
- List of township-level divisions of Guizhou
