= Erlang station =

Chongqing Rail Transit station

Erlang 二郎
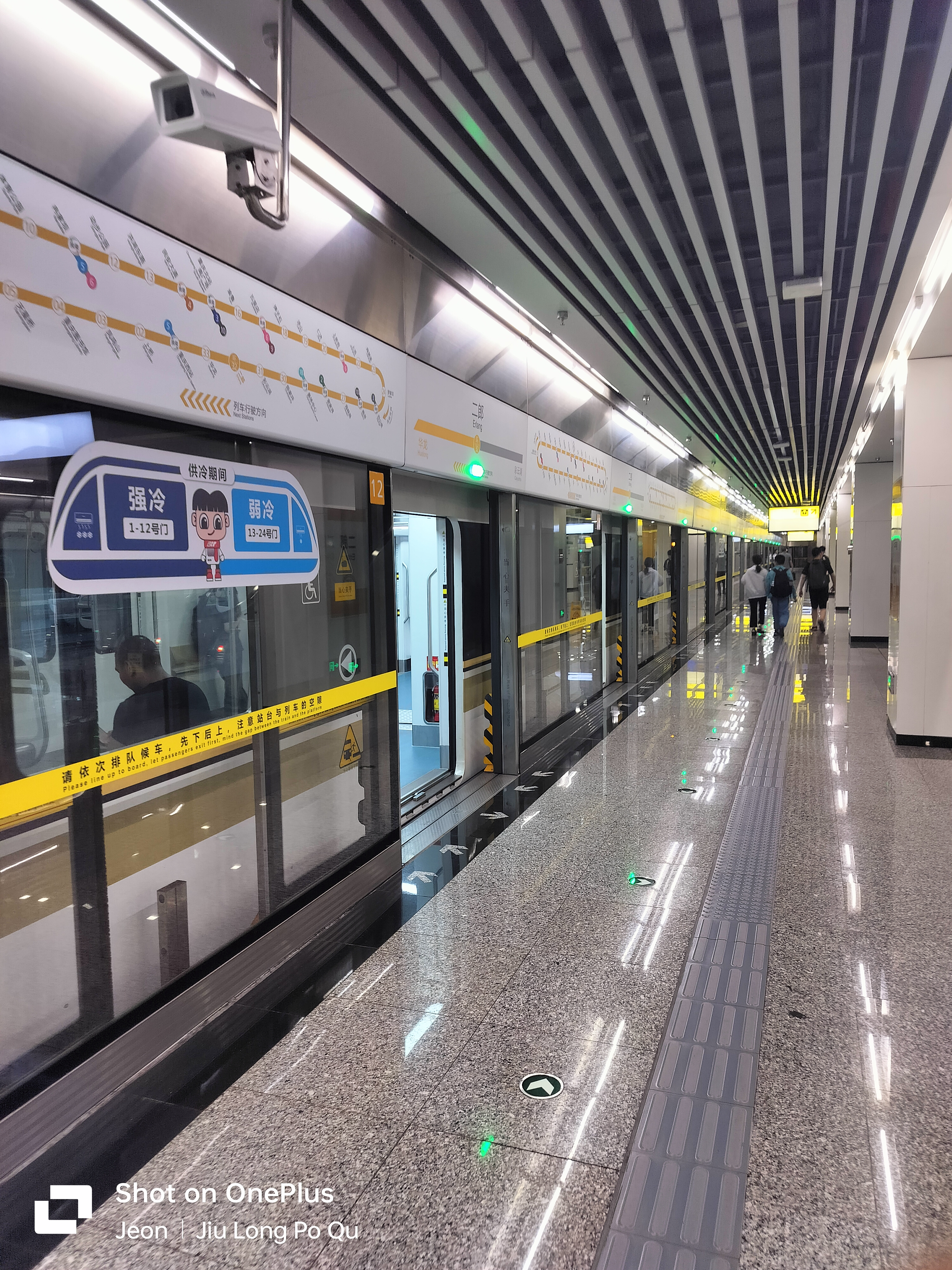
- Platform

General information
- Location: Chongqing; China
- Operated by: Chongqing Rail Transit Corp., Ltd
- Line: Loop line
- Platforms: 2 (1 island platform)

Construction
- Structure type: Underground

Other information
- Station code: 环/32

History
- Opened: 30 December 2019; 6 years ago

Services
| Preceding station | Chongqing Rail Transit | Following station |
|---|---|---|
| Caiyunhu Counter-clockwise | Loop line | Hualong Clockwise |
Location

Erlang Station is a station on Loop line of Chongqing Rail Transit in Chongqing municipality, China. It is located in Jiulongpo District and opened in 2019.
