= Chongzun Expressway =

Road in Guizhou, China

Chongzun Expressway (Chinese: 崇遵高速公路) connects Chongxihe, Tongzi County and Zunyi City in the Chinese province of Guizhou. It is part of Lanhai Expressway.
