= Daba, Guizhou =

Daba 大坝镇
- Town
- Location in China
- Coordinates: 28°1′33″N 106°24′48″E
- Country: People's Republic of China
- Province: Guizhou
- Prefecture-level city: Zunyi
- County-level city: Renhuai
- Time zone: UTC+8 (China Standard)

Daba (simplified Chinese: 大坝; traditional Chinese: 大垻; pinyin: Dàbà) is a town under the administration of Renhuai, Guizhou, China.

As of 2020, it has Daba Residential Neighborhood and the following six villages under its administration:

- Bojiba Village (簸箕坝村)
- Hongyang Village (红阳村)
- Wucha Village (五岔村)
- Xiao'ergou Village (小耳沟村)
- Yanping Village (岩坪村)
- Xintian Village (新田村)

== See also ==
- List of township-level divisions of Guizhou
