= Hualong station =

Chongqing Rail Transit station

Hualong 华龙
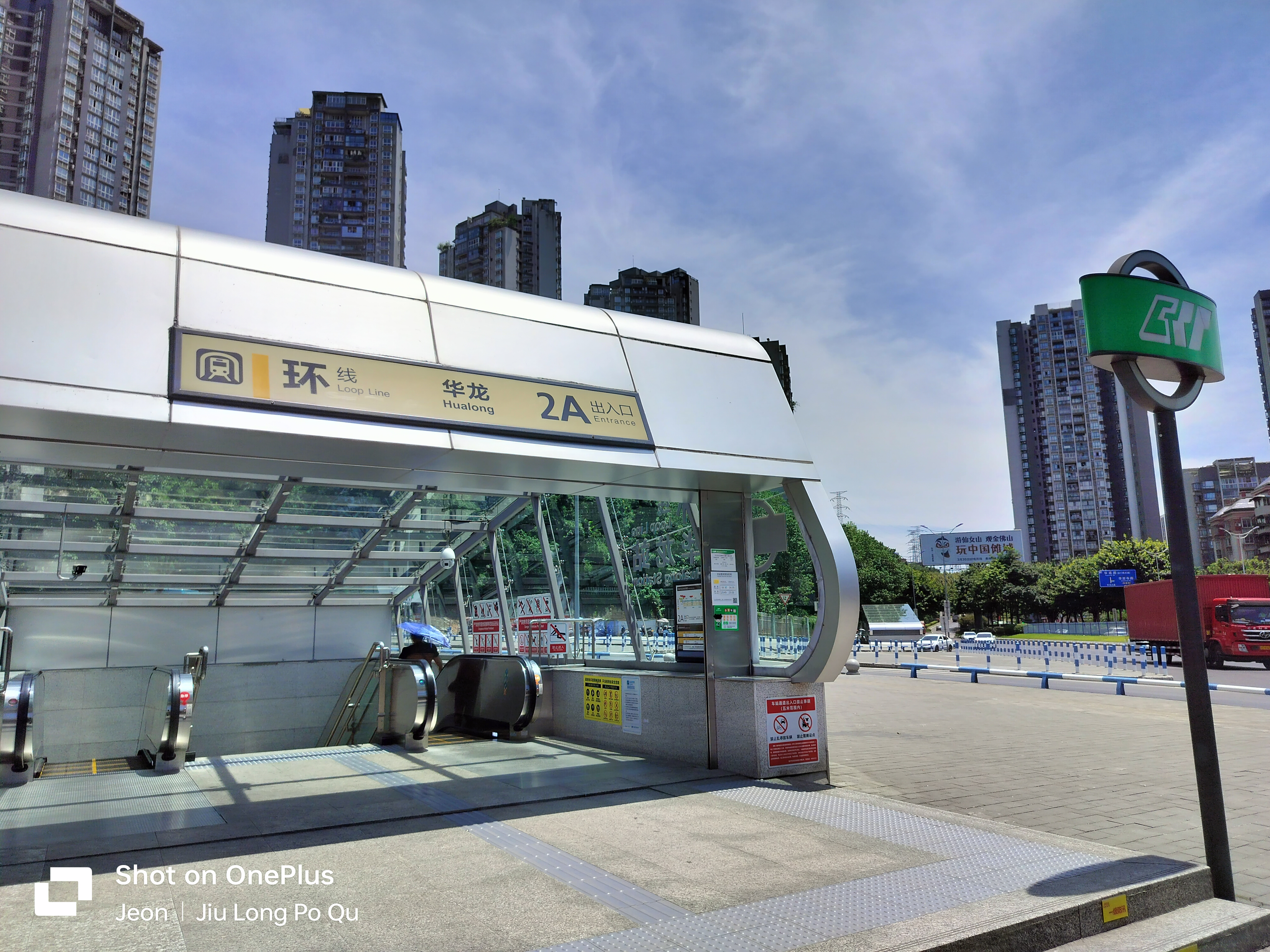
- Entrance 2A

General information
- Location: Chongqing; China
- Coordinates: 29.4981°N 106.4489°E
- Operated by: Chongqing Rail Transit Corp., Ltd
- Line: Loop line
- Platforms: 4 (2 island platforms)

Construction
- Structure type: Underground

Other information
- Station code: /

History
- Opened: 20 January 2021; 5 years ago

Services
Preceding station	Chongqing Rail Transit	Following station
Erlang Counter-clockwise	Loop line	Chongqing West Station Clockwise
Location

Hualong station is a station on Loop line of Chongqing Rail Transit in Chongqing municipality, China. It is located in Jiulongpo District and opened in 2021.

There are 2 island platforms at this station, located separately on two floors. On each floor, only one side of the platform is currently in use and the other side is reserved.
