= Baotou (Yinchuan)–Hainan corridor =

High-speed rail corridor in China

The Baotou (Yinchuan)–Hainan corridor (Chinese: 包（银）海通道; pinyin: Bāo (Yín) Hǎi Tōngdào) is a high-speed rail corridor and one of the eight north–south routes in China's "Eight Vertical and Eight Horizontal" network.

== Route ==
=== Main route (Baotou-Sanya) ===
Section		Description	Designed speed (km/h)	Length (km)	Construction start date	Open date
Baotou–Ordos		Mid-to-long term planning				
Ordos–Yan'an Yan'an–Yulin–Ordos high-speed railway		HSR from Ordos, run through Yulin to Yan'an	350	390	5 November 2023	2028 (exp.)
Yan'an–Xi'an Xi'an–Yan'an high-speed railway		HSR from Yan'an to Xi'an	350	292	9 January 2020	26 December 2025
Chongqing–Xi'an high-speed railway	Xi'an–Ankang	HSR from Xi'an to Ankang	350	171	29 September 2021	28 September 2026 (Xi'an East - Ankang West)
Chongqing–Xi'an high-speed railway	Ankang–Chongqing	HSR from Ankang to Chongqing	350	479	29 November 2022	2028 (exp.)
Chongqing–Guiyang (old)		Class I railway from Chongqing to Guiyang	200	345	22 December 2010	25 January 2018
Chongqing–Guiyang (new)		Planned HSR from Chongqing to Gui'an/Guiyang	350	383	Mid-to-long term planning	
Guiyang–Nanning	Guiyang–Libo	HSR from Guiyang to Libo	350	205	29 December 2016	8 August 2023
Guiyang–Nanning	Libo–Nanning	HSR from Libo to Nanning	350	307	29 December 2016	31 August 2023
Nanning–Hepu (old)	Nanning–Qinzhou	HSR from Nanning to Qinzhou	250	99	11 December 2008	30 December 2013
Nanning–Hepu (old)	Qinzhou–Hepu Qinzhou–Beihai high-speed railway (section)	HSR from Qinzhou to Hepu	250		23 June 2009	30 December 2013
Nanning–Hepu (new)		Planned HSR from Nanning to Hepu	350	~172	Mid-to-long term planning	
Hepu–Zhanjiang		Planned HSR from Hepu/Beihai to Zhanjiang	350	137	2024 (exp.)	2025 (exp.)
Zhanjiang–Haikou	Zhanjiang–Xuwen	Planned HSR from Zhanjiang (West/North) to Xuwen	350	~129	Earlier than 2025 (exp.)	
Zhanjiang–Haikou	Xuwen–Haikou	Across Qiongzhou Strait via ferries at the moment, planned fixed link in the future				
Hainan ring HSRs	Eastern ring	HSRs around Haikou and Sanya	250	308	29 June 2007	30 December 2010
Hainan ring HSRs	Western ring	HSRs around Haikou and Sanya	200	344	2011	30 December 2015

=== Branches ===
Section		Description	Designed speed (km/h)	Length (km)	Construction start date	Open date
Yinchuan–Xi'an high-speed railway	Yinchuan–Wuzhong	HSR from Yinchuan to Wuzhong	250 (reserved for higher speed)	74	9 August 2016	29 December 2019
Yinchuan–Xi'an high-speed railway	Wuzhong–Xi'an	HSR from Wuzhong to Xi'an	250 (reserved for higher speed)	544	9 August 2016	26 December 2020
Fankuai–Wanzhou Chongqing–Xi'an high-speed railway (section)		HSR from Fankuai to Wanzhou	350	90	29 November 2022	2028 (exp.)
