= Tongzi County =

Tongzi County 桐梓县 Tungtze; Tungtse
- County
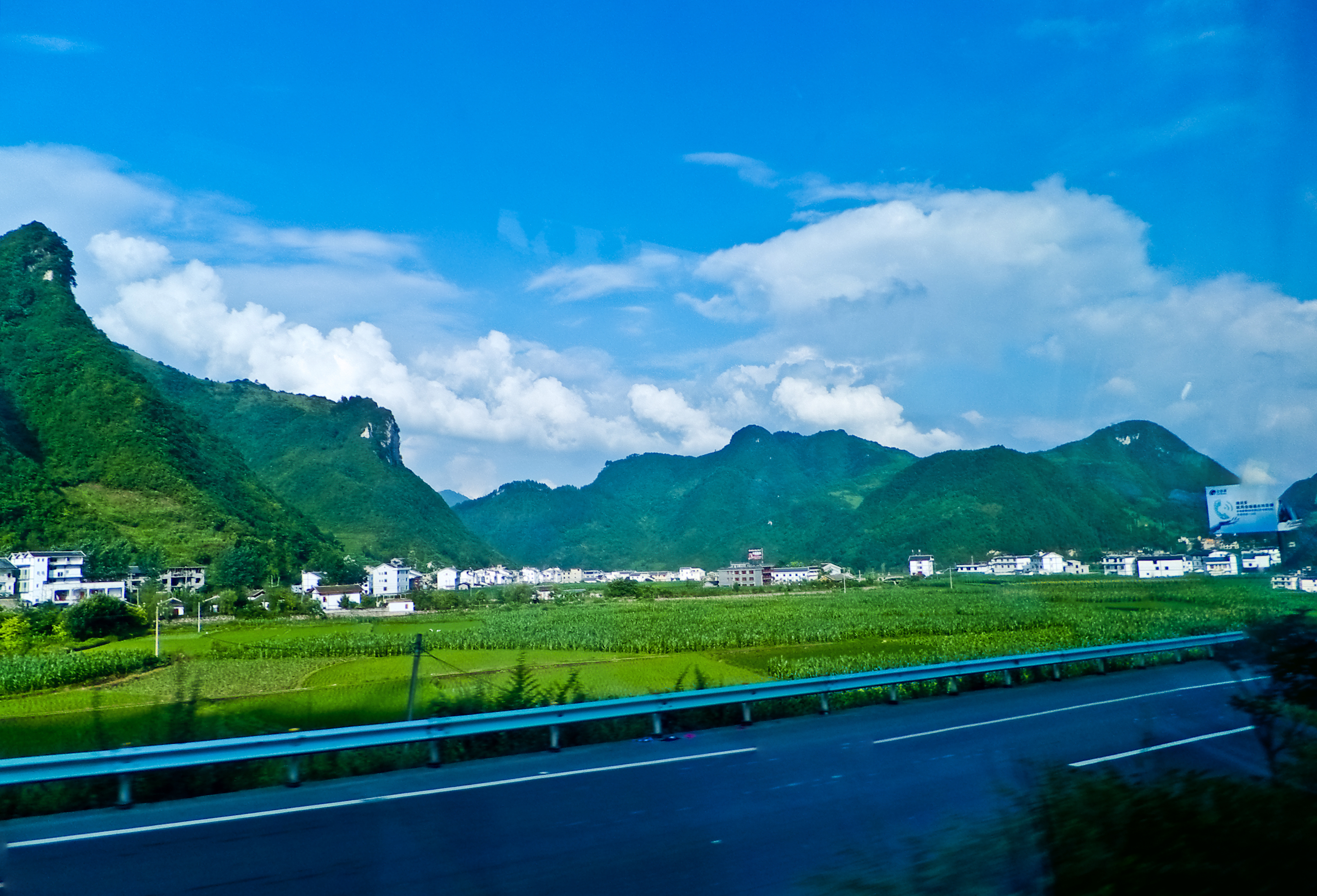

- Location of the seat in Guizhou Tongzi (Southwest China)
- Coordinates (Tongzi County government): 28°07′59″N 106°49′29″E
- Country: China
- Province: Guizhou
- Prefecture-level city: Zunyi
- County seat: Loushanguan Subdistrict

Area
  - Total: 3,193.54 km^{2} (1,233.03 sq mi)

Population (2010)
  - Total: 521,567
  - Density: 163.319/km^{2} (422.995/sq mi)
- Time zone: UTC+8 (China Standard)
- Postal code: 563200

Tongzi (Chinese: 桐梓; pinyin: Tóngzǐ) is a county under the administration of the prefecture-level city of Zunyi, in the north of Guizhou province, China, bordering Chongqing to the north.

The county government is located in the town of Loushanguan.

== Administrative divisions ==
Tongzi County is divided into 2 subdistricts, 20 towns, 2 townships and 1 ethnic township:

subdistricts

- Loushanguan Subdistrict 娄山关街道
- Haixiao Subdistrict 海校街道

towns

- Chumi Town 楚米镇
- Xinzhan Town 新站镇
- Songkan Town 松坎镇
- Gaoqiao Town 高桥镇
- Shuibatang Town 水坝塘镇
- Guancang Town 官仓镇
- Huaqiu Town 花秋镇
- Yangdeng Town 羊磴镇
- Jiuba Town 九坝镇
- Dahe Town 大河镇
- Yelang Town 夜郎镇
- Mugua Town 木瓜镇
- Podu Town 坡渡镇
- Liaoyuan Town 燎原镇
- Shixi Town 狮溪镇
- Maoshi Town 茅石镇
- Yaolongshan Town 尧龙山镇
- Fengshui Town 风水镇
- Rongguang Town 容光镇
- Bajiao Town 芭蕉镇

townships

- Xiaoshui Township 小水乡
- Huanglian Township 黄莲乡

ethnic township

- Mazong Miao Ethnic Township 马鬃苗族乡

== Transportation ==
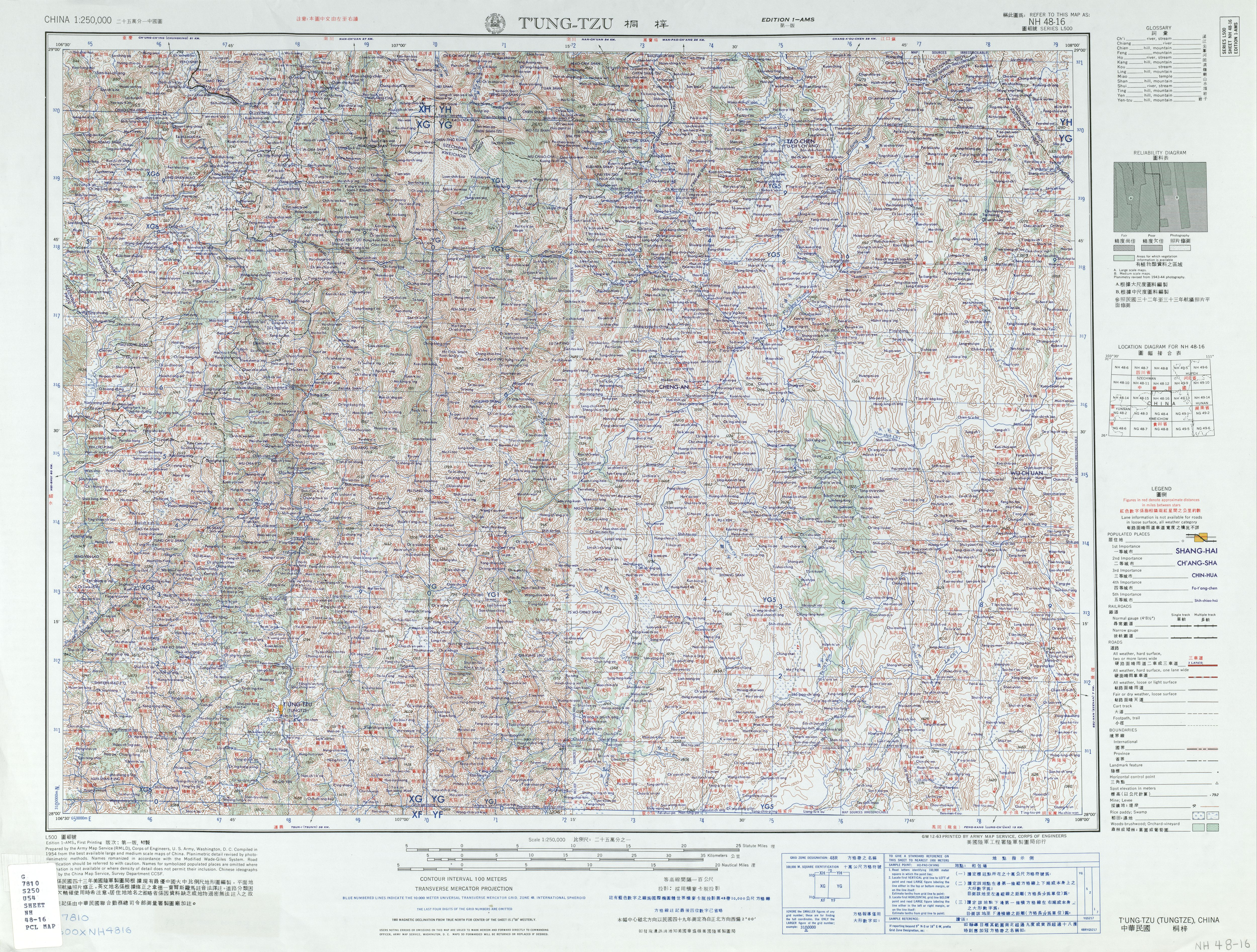
Map including Tongzi (labeled as T'UNG-TZU 桐梓) (AMS, 1954)

=== Rail ===
- Chuanqian Railway
- Chongqing–Guiyang high-speed railway

=== Roads ===
- Chongzun Expressway
- China National Highway 210
- China National Highway 050

== Climate ==
Climate data for Tongzi, elevation 972 m (3,189 ft), (1991–2020 normals, extremes 1981–present)
Month	Jan	Feb	Mar	Apr	May	Jun	Jul	Aug	Sep	Oct	Nov	Dec	Year
Record high °C (°F)	22.4 (72.3)	30.3 (86.5)	32.7 (90.9)	33.0 (91.4)	35.1 (95.2)	33.4 (92.1)	35.9 (96.6)	36.6 (97.9)	36.4 (97.5)	32.8 (91.0)	27.1 (80.8)	21.1 (70.0)	36.6 (97.9)
Mean daily maximum °C (°F)	7.2 (45.0)	10.2 (50.4)	14.9 (58.8)	20.3 (68.5)	23.9 (75.0)	26.1 (79.0)	29.3 (84.7)	29.5 (85.1)	25.4 (77.7)	19.3 (66.7)	14.8 (58.6)	9.1 (48.4)	19.2 (66.5)
Daily mean °C (°F)	4.5 (40.1)	6.7 (44.1)	10.7 (51.3)	15.7 (60.3)	19.2 (66.6)	21.9 (71.4)	24.6 (76.3)	24.3 (75.7)	20.8 (69.4)	15.7 (60.3)	11.3 (52.3)	6.2 (43.2)	15.1 (59.2)
Mean daily minimum °C (°F)	2.6 (36.7)	4.5 (40.1)	8.0 (46.4)	12.4 (54.3)	15.8 (60.4)	18.9 (66.0)	21.3 (70.3)	20.6 (69.1)	17.6 (63.7)	13.3 (55.9)	8.9 (48.0)	4.2 (39.6)	12.3 (54.2)
Record low °C (°F)	−4.7 (23.5)	−4.4 (24.1)	−4.5 (23.9)	2.7 (36.9)	6.6 (43.9)	12.3 (54.1)	13.3 (55.9)	14.1 (57.4)	9.5 (49.1)	4.1 (39.4)	−2.1 (28.2)	−5.3 (22.5)	−5.3 (22.5)
Average precipitation mm (inches)	17.3 (0.68)	15.9 (0.63)	42.5 (1.67)	76.5 (3.01)	133.6 (5.26)	187.5 (7.38)	148.4 (5.84)	127.1 (5.00)	102.9 (4.05)	97.0 (3.82)	37.4 (1.47)	17.8 (0.70)	1,003.9 (39.51)
Average precipitation days (≥ 0.1 mm)	13.0	11.4	13.9	15.4	17.6	17.6	13.3	12.4	12.5	17.1	12.0	11.9	168.1
Average snowy days	5.8	2.9	0.8	0	0	0	0	0	0	0	0.1	1.9	11.5
Average relative humidity (%)	80	78	77	77	77	80	76	75	77	82	80	80	78
Mean monthly sunshine hours	25.6	38.1	64.4	89.8	100.0	90.5	156.4	168.2	112.2	60.2	58.4	38.2	1,002
Percentage possible sunshine	8	12	17	23	24	22	37	42	31	17	18	12	22
Source: China Meteorological Administration
