= Chongqing–Guiyang railway =

Chinese railway line

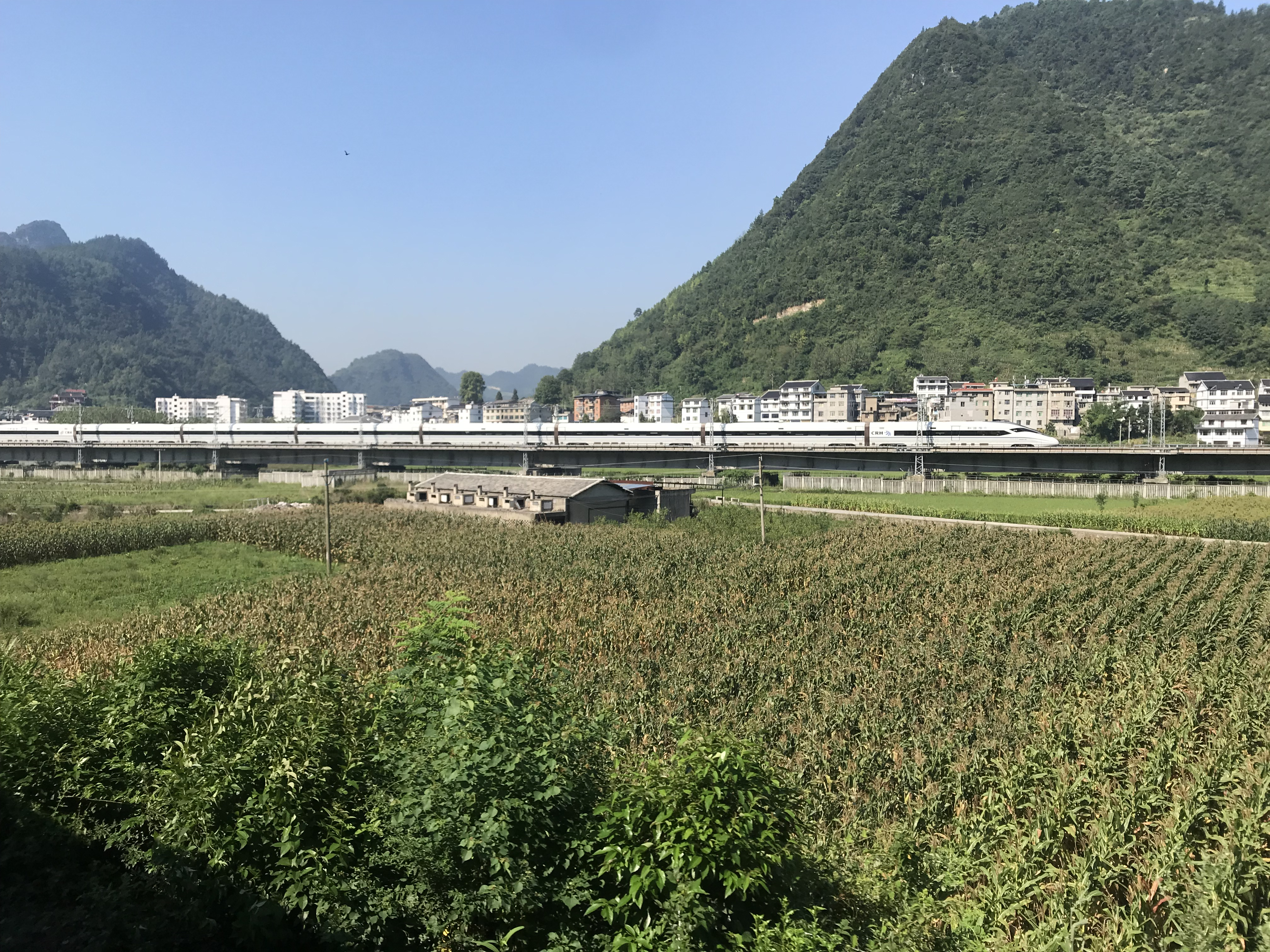
- 201908 CRH380D on Chongqing-Guiyang Railway in Banqiao, Zunyi

Overview
- Native name: 渝贵铁路
- Status: Operating
- Locale: Chongqing and Guizhou Province, China
- Termini: Chongqing West; Guiyang North

Service
- Services: 1
- Operator(s): China Railway Chengdu Group

History
- Opened: January 25, 2018

Technical
- Line length: 345 km (214 mi)
- Track gauge: 1,435 mm (4 ft 8 1/2 in)
- Operating speed: 200 km/h (120 mph)

Chongqing–Guiyang railway is a major trunk higher-speed rail selected for construction under the 11th Five Year Plan set by the Chinese Government. Construction started on December 22, 2010, and opened on January 25, 2018.

== Profile ==
The railway extends from Chongqing to Guizhou for a total length of 345 km (214 mi). Of this, 112 km (70 mi) are within Chongqing and 233 km (145 mi) within Guizhou Province. The total investment amounted to around 44.92 billion RMB. The design corresponds to national level I railway standards; the line is electrified and double-track. The design speed is 250 km/h (155 mph) and the foreseen operational speed is 200 km/h (124 mph). The main function of this railway is passenger, express freight, and container transport.

The line forms part of a larger network of railways such as the Chongqing–Lanzhou railway and the Guiyang–Guangzhou high-speed railway, fast becoming another important access route to the sea. Trains run from Chongqing to Guiyang in two hours and from Chongqing to Guangzhou in six hours. It improves the north–south movement of passengers and fast freight along the railway transport corridor while also relieving pressures and increasing capacities on existing conventional railway lines in the region. It is seen as a potential catalyst for economic development in several impoverished areas, especially in Guizhou, one of the poorest provinces of China.

The line forms part of the Baotou (Yinchuan)–Hainan corridor. A parallel Chongqing–Guiyang high-speed railway is planned in the medium or long term.

== Route ==
Starting in Chongqing's Shapingba District at Chongqing West railway station, the line passes through Qijiang, Tongzi, Zunyi, and Xifeng and terminates at Guiyang North railway station.

The Chongqing–Guizhou railway follows a route generally similar to that of the older Sichuan–Guizhou railway, constructed in 1956–65; however due to the more extensive use of tunnels (145 of them), the new line is significantly shorter (345 km (214 mi) instead of 423 km (263 mi)).

=== Stations ===
- Chongqing West (重庆西)
- Luohuang South (珞璜南),
- Qijiang East (綦江东),
- Ganshui East (赶水东),
- Tongzi North (桐梓北),
- Tongzi East (桐梓东),
- Loushanguan South (娄山关南),
- Zunyi (遵义),
- Longkeng (龙坑),
- Zunyi South (遵义南),
- Xifeng (息烽),
- Xiuwenxian (修文县),
- Guiyang North (贵阳北)
