= Baishatuo Yangtze River Railway Bridge =

Baishatuo Yangtze River Railway Bridge 白沙沱長江大橋
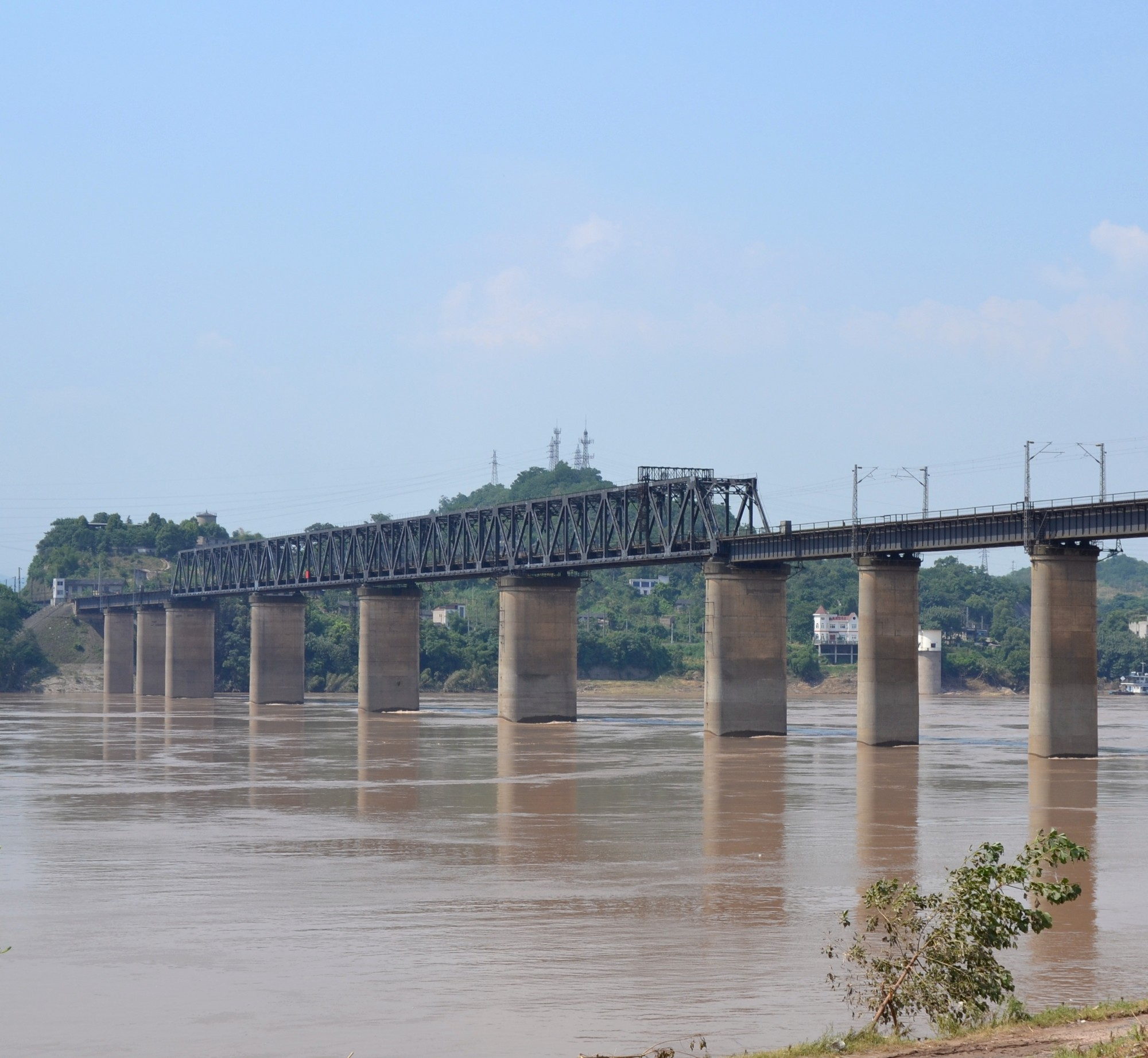
- Coordinates: 29.353714°N 106.425267°E
- Carries: Chuanqian Railway
- Crosses: Yangtze River
- Locale: Chongqing, China

Characteristics
- Design: Truss bridge
- Material: Steel
- Total length: 825 metres (2,707 ft)
- Longest span: 80 metres (260 ft)

History
- Construction end: 1960
- Closed: 24 April 2019

The Baishatuo Yangtze River Railway Bridge (Chinese: 白沙沱长江大桥) is a truss bridge across the Yangtze River between the Jiangjin District and the Dadukou District of Chongqing, China.

The bridge carries two tracks of the Chongqing-Guiyang Railway. Completed in 1960, the bridge was the first bridge over the Yangtze River in Chongqing and only the second bridge along the main stretch of the river between Yibin and the river mouth in Shanghai. Only the Wuhan Yangtze River Bridge, completed in 1957, pre-dates the Baishatuo Railway Bridge. There are now over 50 bridges which cross the river downstream of the Baishatuo Railway Bridge.

It was closed on 24 April 2019 and replaced by the New Baishatuo Yangtze River Railway Bridge, which is a six-track cable-stayed bridge, with four tracks for passenger operations on its upper deck and two tracks for freight operations on its lower deck. The old bridge is to be demolished because it is considered too low as the water level is to be raised by a dam.

== See also ==
- Yangtze River bridges and tunnels
