= China National Light Industry Council =

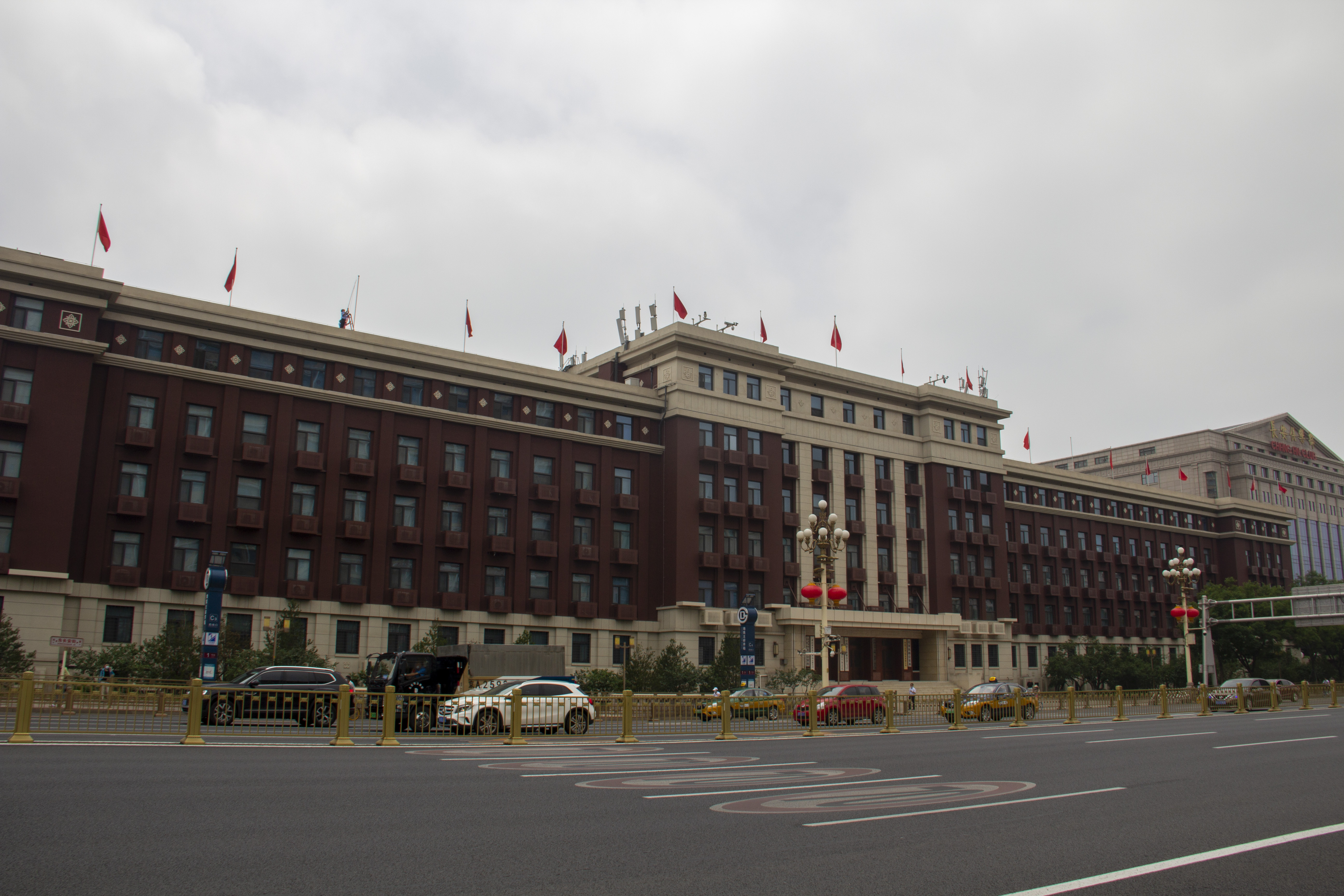

The China National Light Industry Council is a China-wide comprehensive industry intermediary organization with service and management functions.

Its goal is to act as a bridge between government and enterprise by representing a wide range of service and production enterprises. The organization also promotes the development of light industry in China and strengthens international exchange and cooperation.
