= Loushan Pass =

1935 poem by Mao Zedong

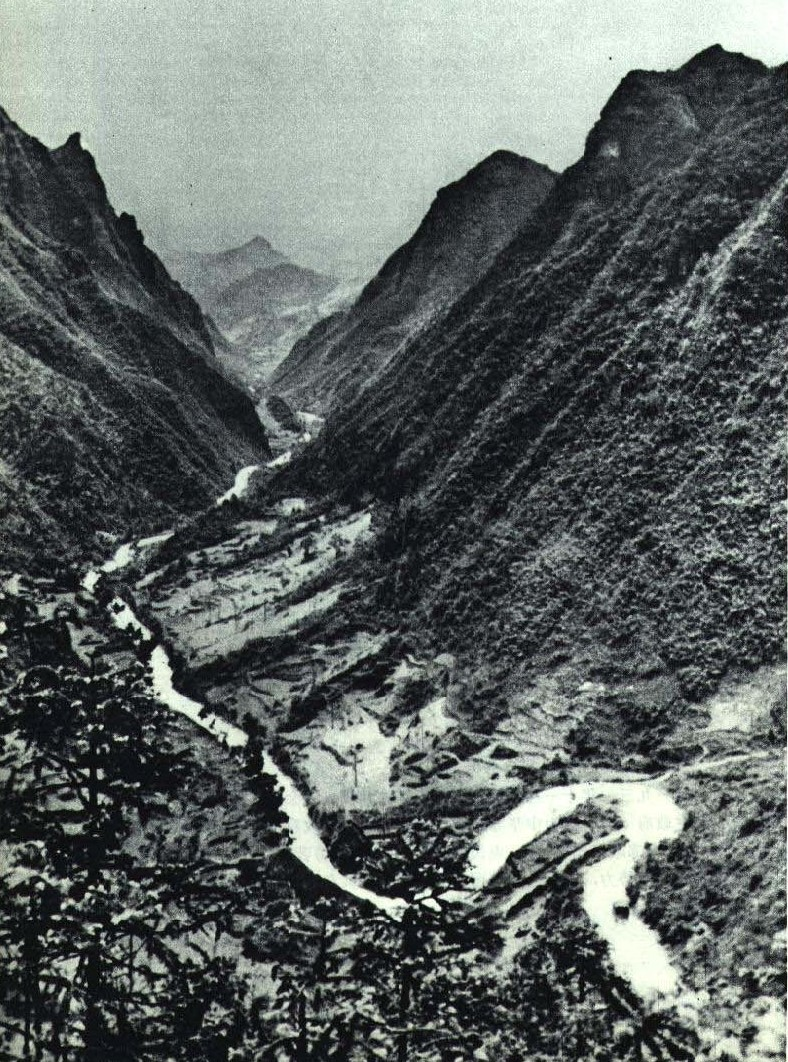
Scene of Loushan Pass, from People's Daily Issue 10, 1967.

Loushan Pass (Note: simplified Chinese: 忆秦娥·娄山关; traditional Chinese: 憶秦娥·婁山關 Hanyu Pinyin: Yì qín é·lóu shān guān. Translation: "Remembering the Beauty of Qin: Loushan Pass) is a ci poem written by Mao Zedong in February 1935, during the Long March.

== Background ==
Loushan Pass itself is a gorge among mountains north of Tongzi County, Guizhou province, China. It is a strategic position between Tongzi and Sichuan known for how difficult it is to cross, having a long, winding path going up towards three high peaks.

On 16th October, 1934, during the Long March, the Red Army began travelling from Kiansi through ten provinces, around 6,500 miles in total, hoping to arrive in Shensi to form an anti-Japanese camp. Only a small percentage of the original army survived. The Red Army traversed Loushan Pass on this journey, inspiring the poem, hoping to occupy Zunyi and Tongzi. On 25th February 1935, the Red Army would complete their second traversal of Loushan Pass, battling Liu Henming's regiment led by Du Zhaohua. Peng Dehuai would launch a counterattack against Kuomintang forces, driving them away by the 27th of February, occupying Zunyi; come the 28th, KMT forces were wiped out and driven to Wujiang River. Mao would write and publish the poem soon after.

Qin, referenced in the poem's title "憶秦娥," meaning "Remembering the Beauty of Qin," is a reference to the poem of the same name by Li Bai.

== Poem ==
憶秦娥·婁山關
現代-毛澤東
西風烈，長空雁叫霜晨月。
霜晨月，馬蹄聲碎，喇叭聲咽。
雄關漫道真如鐵，而今邁步從頭越。
從頭越，蒼山如海，殘陽如血。

A hard west wind,
in the vast frozen air wild geese shriek to the morning moon,
frozen morning moon.
Horse hoofs shatter the air,
and the bugles sob.

The grim pass is like iron,
yet today we cross the summit in one step,
cross the summit.
Before us greenblue mountains are like the sea,
the dying sun like blood.

== See also ==
- Poetry of Mao Zedong
