= Sichuan–Guizhou railway =

Railway line in China

The Sichuan–Guizhou railway or Chuanqian railway (simplified Chinese: 川黔铁路; traditional Chinese: 川黔鐵路; pinyin: chuānqiǎn tiělù), is a single-track electrified railroad in southwest China between Chongqing Municipality and Guiyang, Guizhou Province. The shorthand name for the line, Chuanqian, is derived from the shorthand names of Sichuan Province (Chuan 川), to which Chongqing once belonged, and Guizhou (Qian 黔).

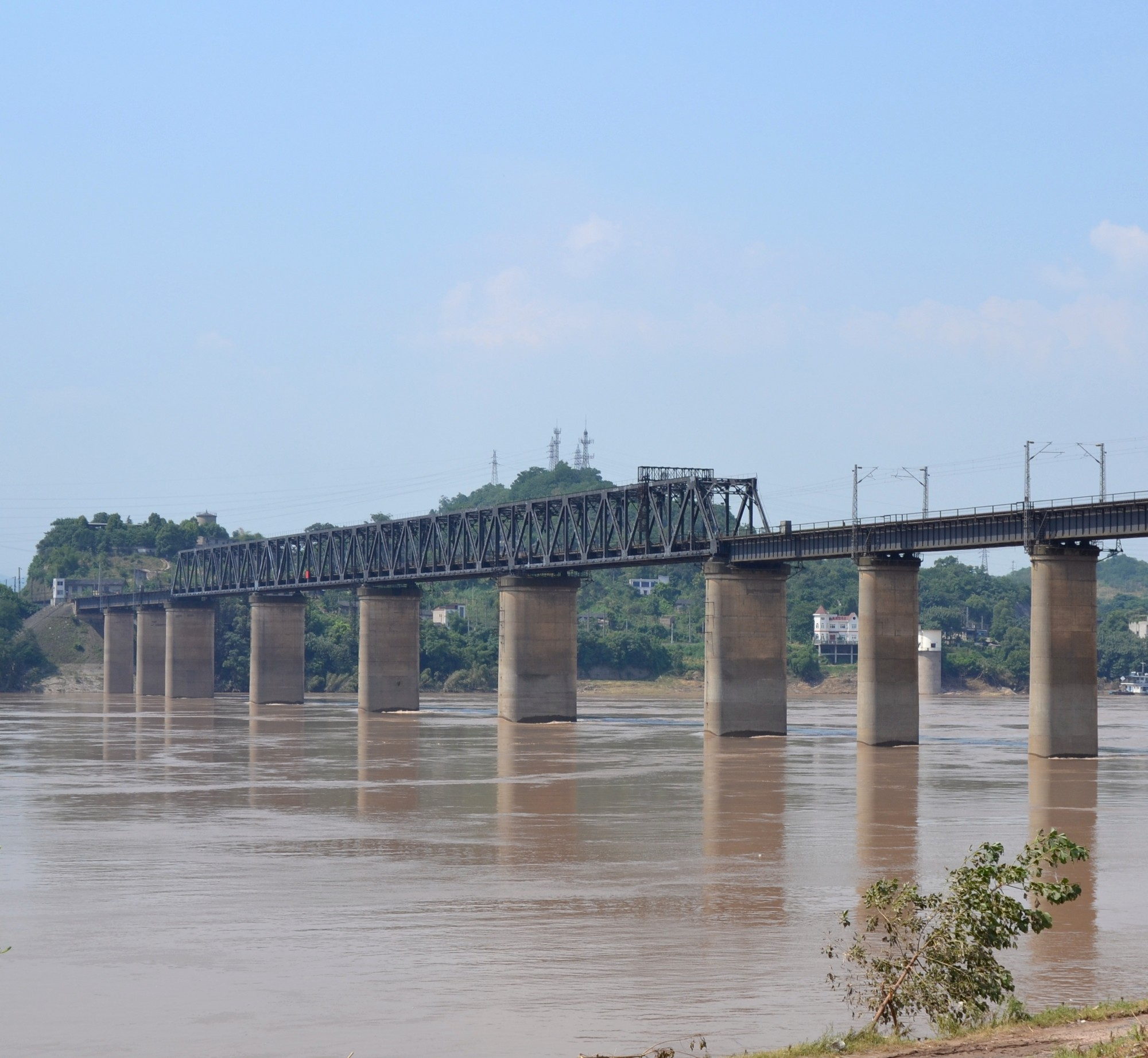
The Sichuan–Guizhou railway crosses the Yangtze River via the Baishatuo Railway Bridge in Chongqing.

The railway was built from 1956 to 1965 and had a total length of 423.6 km (263 mi). The line was electrified in 1991. Major cities and towns along route include Chongqing, Qijiang, Tongzi, Zunyi, and Guiyang. The Chuanqian railway is a major rail conduit in western China from Baotou in Inner Mongolia to the Gulf of Tonkin.

== Route ==
The Sichuan–Guizhou railway originates in the north from the Chongqing railway station and shares tracks with the Chengdu–Chongqing railway to Xiaonanhai. The line crosses the Yangtze River via the Baishatuo Railway Bridge and passes through Qijiang before entering northern Guizhou, where it ends at Guiyang railway station. The Liangfengya Tunnel 4,270 m (14,009 ft) on the Chuanqian Line in Tongzi was the longest railway tunnel in China when it was built.

== Rail connections ==
- Chongqing: Chengdu–Chongqing railway, Xiangyang–Chongqing railway, Chongqing–Huaihua railway, Chongqing–Lichuan railway
- Guiyang: Shanghai–Kunming railway, Guizhou–Guangxi railway

== See also ==
- List of railways in China
