= Maotai =

Chinese alcoholic beverage

Maotai 茅台
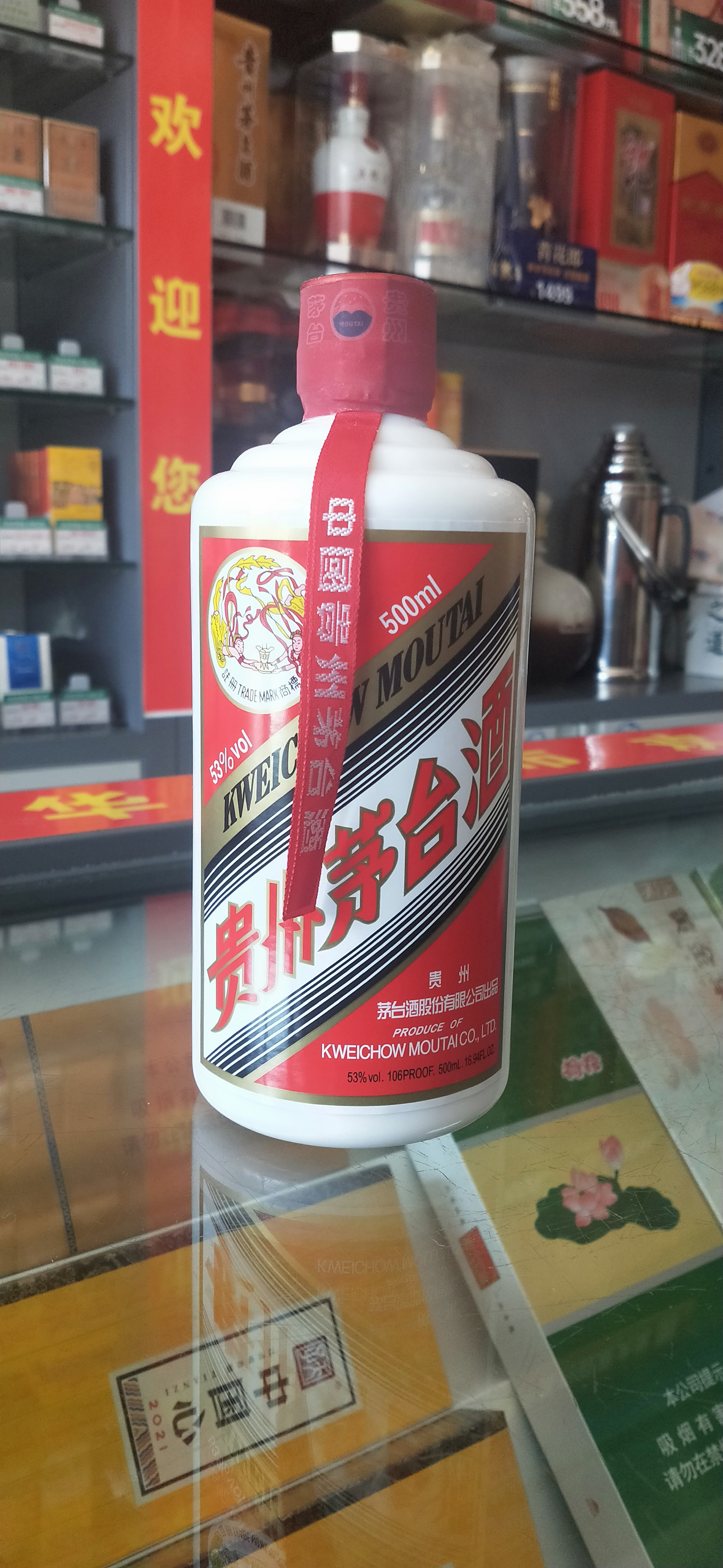
- Type: Baijiu, Jiangxiang
- Manufacturer: Kweichow Moutai, and others
- Origin: China, Guizhou
- Introduced: Qing Dynasty
- Alcohol by volume: 38%–53%
- Colour: Clear
- Ingredients: Sorghum

Maotai
- Simplified Chinese: 茅台
- Traditional Chinese: 茅臺
- Hanyu Pinyin: Máotái
Transcriptions
Standard Mandarin
- Hanyu Pinyin: Máotái
- IPA: [mǎʊ.tʰǎɪ]
Yue: Cantonese
- Yale Romanization: Maau^{4}toi^{4}
- IPA: [maw˩.tʰɔj˩]
Southern Min
- Hokkien POJ: Bâu-tâi / Mâu-tâi

Maotai, or Moutai (simplified Chinese: 茅台; traditional Chinese: 茅臺; pinyin: máotái), is a style of baijiu made in the Chinese town of Maotai in Guizhou province. Maotai is made from sorghum, a wheat-based qū, and water from the Chishui River. It uses traditional Chinese techniques of fermentation, distillation, and aging, to produce a spirit with a nutty, grainy, and savory aroma and flavor.

The most famous and best-selling brand of Maotai is produced by Kweichow Moutai, which has become the most valuable spirits brand worldwide. However, despite common misconceptions, Kweichow Moutai is not the only producer of Maotai, nor do they own any exclusive right to the name. To be classified as Maotai, it must be produced in the eponymous town and follow regulated production guidelines.

== History ==
Alcohol production in Zunyi, on the banks of the Chishui River, has a long history dating back to at least the 1st and 2nd centuries BCE where there is record of Han dynasty Emperor Wu tasting and praising a goqijiu produced in Yelang. However, it was not until the Tang and Song dynasties that grain-based distilled alcohols began to develop in China as a whole.

The origins of Maotai itself, and the distilleries that preceded Kweichow Moutai, lie in the Qing dynasty after 1644. Beijing officials of the salt monopoly were stationed at an outpost in Maotai. They introduced baijiu production methods from their northerly home (Qingxiang), which were merged with the then-in-use methods from neighboring Sichuan (Nongxiang). The result of this blend of techniques served as the basis for jiangxiang baijiu and more particularly for Maotai itself. The earliest explicit record of Maotai is in 1704, when in Renhuai Caozhi, a local newspaper, it was written that "Moutai Village in the west of the city ranks first in the whole country for making liquor."

In 1854 during the Taiping Rebellion, the town of Maotai was destroyed and all of the distilleries reduced to ruins or abandoned completely. Nine years later, in 1863 a salt merchant from a neighboring town bought one of the abandoned distilleries, hired a retired master distiller, and resumed the production of Maotai in the newly founded "Chengyi" distillery and sixteen years later, in 1879, three Renhuai landlords opened the "Ronghe" distillery. It is with these two distilleries that many of the techniques and profiles of contemporary Maotai were finalized. At the beginning of the 20th century, with the fall of the Qing dynasty and the birth of the Republic of China, Maotai continued to be in demand with "tribute liquor" being crafted at the request of the short lived Chinese leader Yuan Shikai for the occasion of his coronation as emperor. In that same year, Maotai was presented at the 1915 Panama-Pacific Exposition and awarded a medal which spurred a rapid increase in demand for the spirit within China and in response a rapid increase of production capacity for the two distilleries. In 1929 the third distillery "Hengxing" was founded and it is on the foundation of these three distilleries that Kweichow Moutai was to be built.

Maotai's importance in contemporary China has many of its roots in the era of the Chinese Civil War. It was in Zunyi, the prefectural city over the town of Maotai, that Mao Zedong became the leader of the Chinese Communist Party at the Zunyi Conference; and it was during the Long March that many Chinese troops and many of China's future leaders, including Zhou Enlai, gained an appreciation for Maotai. Stories from the time recount Red Army soldiers and officers enjoying Maotai both for consumption and for more practical purposes, primarily the cleaning and disinfection of the soldiers feet. In "Memoirs of the Long March" the author Cheng Fangwu wrote; “Because of the urgent military situation, we dared not drink much liquor. The liquor was mainly used to wipe our feet and relieve fatigue on the road. Wiping feet with the maotai is effective. Everyone praises it." In a likely apocryphal story, company commander Wang Yuenan, and one of Mao's guards Chen Fengchan, were returning from a trip to purchase Maotai for this purpose when they ran into Mao himself who told them; "Maotai is a place famous for its wine, but it would be a pity to wipe your feet with this wine!" While in the town of Maotai during the Long March, the political bureau of the Red Army issued a notice to the passing soldiers to note the importance of Maotai liquor and refrain from interfering in the private distillation of the spirit ongoing except to buy or sell.

Shortly after the end of the Chinese Civil War and after the founding of the People's Republic, the three existing Maotai distilleries, Chengyi, Ronghe, and Hengxing were merged to create the modern, state-owned Kweichow Moutai in 1951.

Since the foundation of the modern Kweichow Moutai, the spirit has served as part of the standard fare for Chinese diplomatic meetings and dinners. From Mao's gifts of Maotai given to Joseph Stalin and Kim Il-Sung in 1950 and 1973 respectively, to Zhou Enlai's use of the spirit as a diplomatic tool for the 1954 Geneva Conference and the welcoming banquet for U.S. President Richard Nixon's 1972 visit to China, Maotai has served as one of the primary cultural items representing China on the international stage. Its use in these terms has become so well known that when Deng Xiaoping visited the United States in 1979, Henry Kissinger told him "I think if we drink enough Moutai we can solve anything."

== Gallery ==
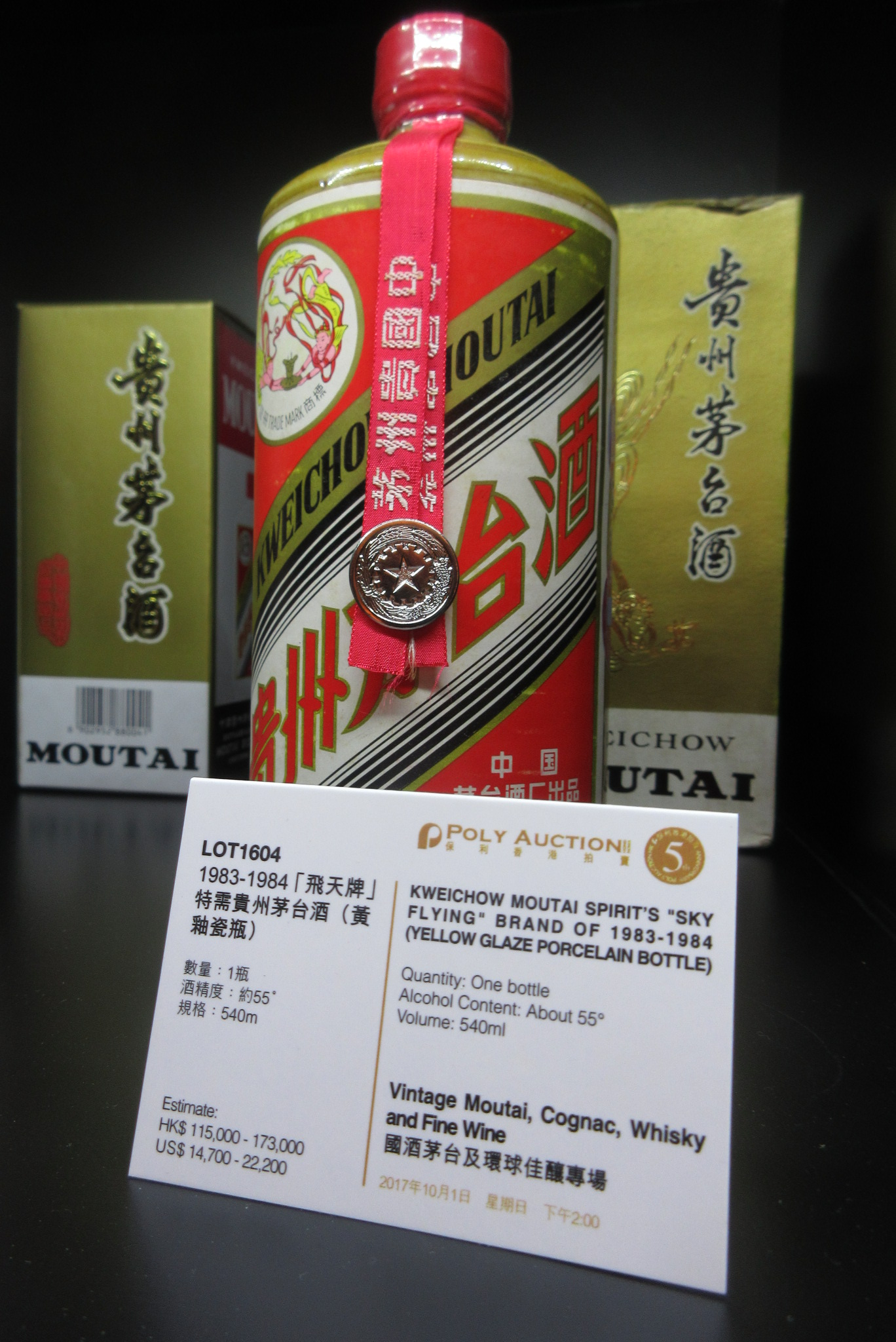
A bottle of Maotai produced in 1983-1984 has an estimated price range of HK$115,000-173,000 (US$14,700-22,200) in an auction in Hong Kong in 2017.

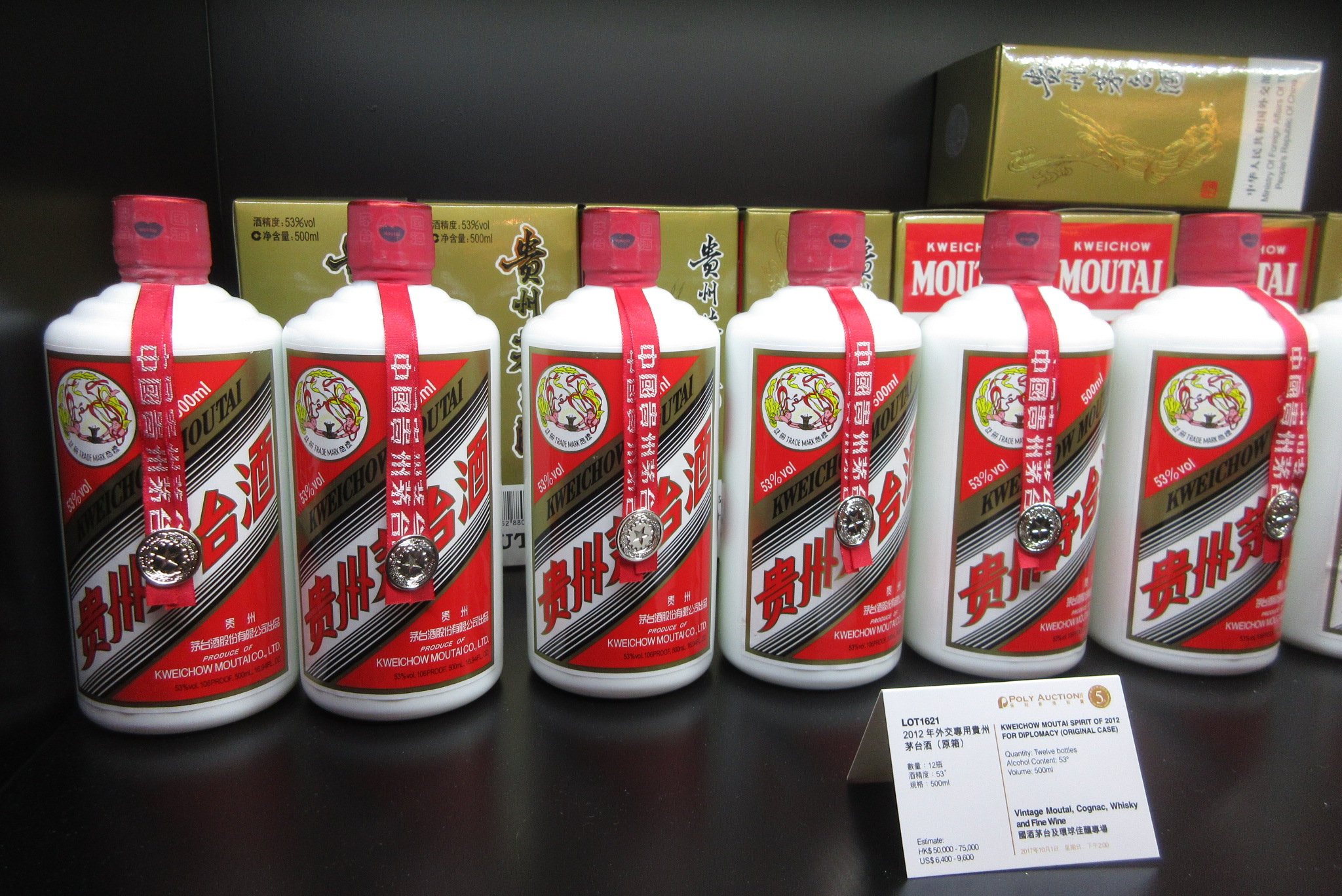
Vintage Maotai in the more common white porcelain bottles displayed in the same auction.

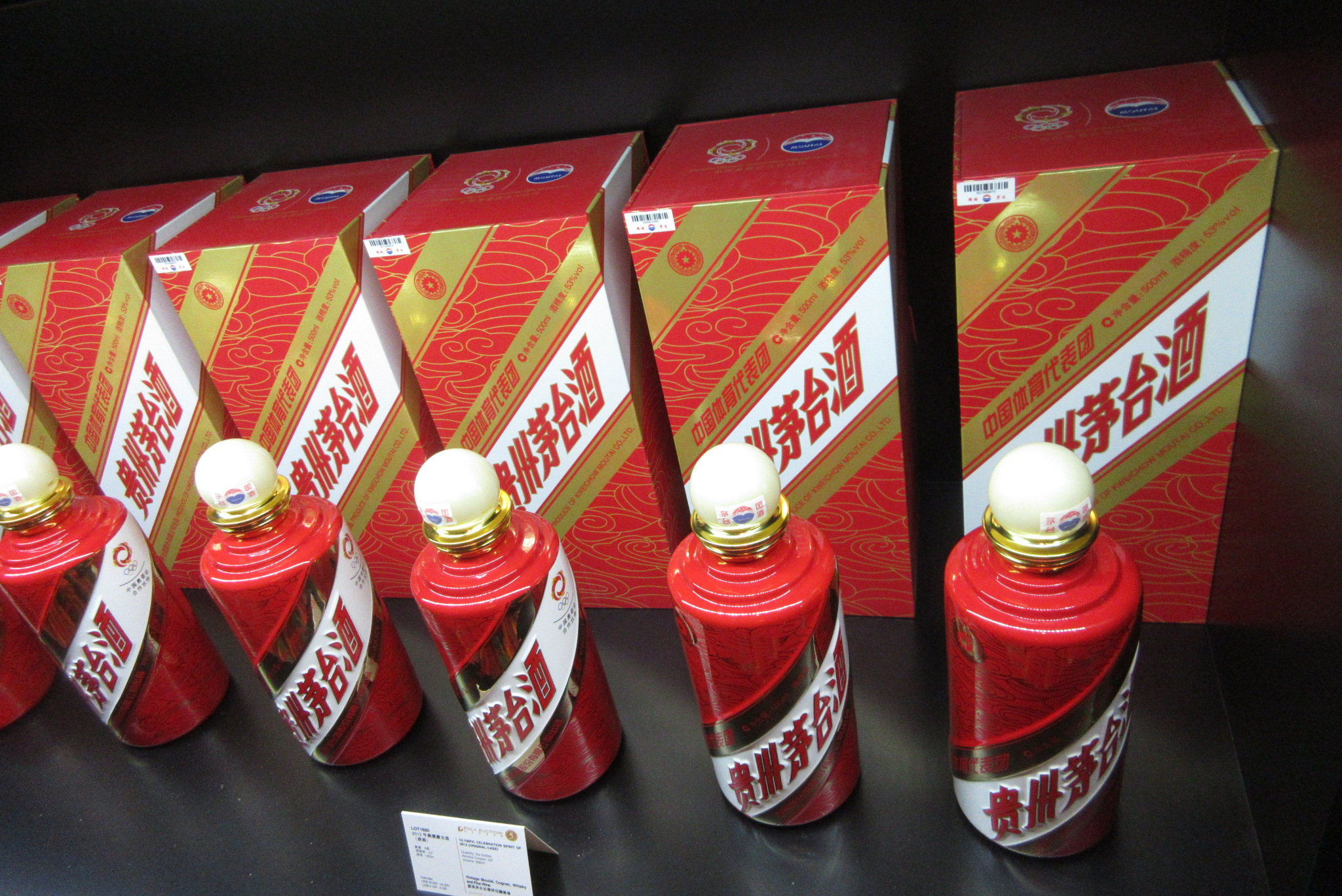
Maotai in red special version bottles
