= Maotai, Guizhou =

Town in China

Maotai 茅台镇
- Town
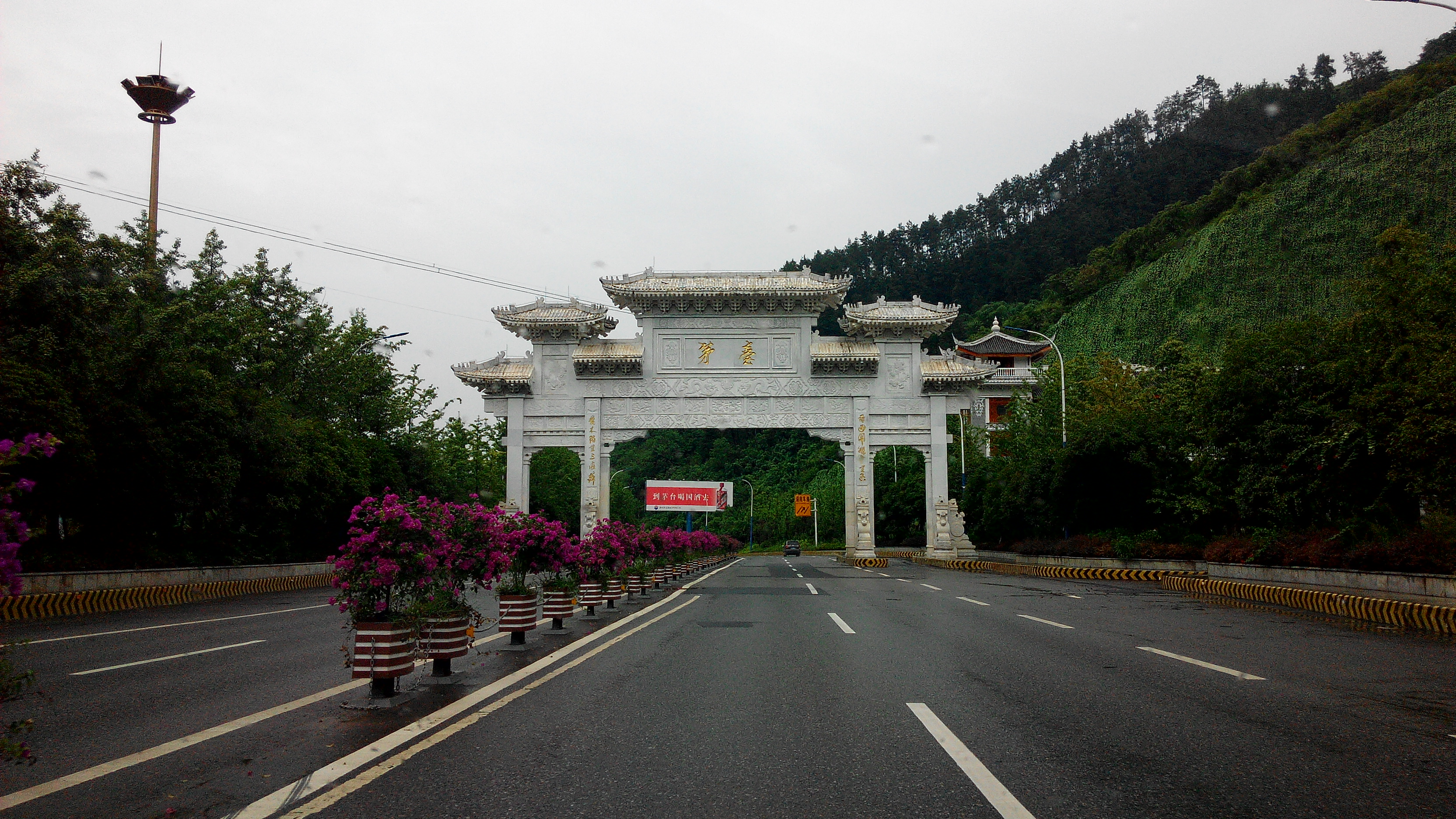
- Paifang at Maotai Town
- Interactive map of Maotai
- Coordinates: 27°51′16″N 106°22′03″E
- Country: People's Republic of China
- Province: Guizhou
- Prefecture-level city: Zunyi
- County-level city: Renhuai
- Village-level divisions: 5 residential communities 8 villages
- Elevation: 453 m (1,486 ft)
- Time zone: UTC+08:00 (China Standard)

Maotai (simplified Chinese: 茅台; traditional Chinese: 茅台 or 茅臺; pinyin: Máotái) is a town in the north of Guizhou province, located on the southeast (right) bank of the Chishui River (赤水河). It is under the administration of Renhuai City. As of 2011, it has five residential communities (社区) and eight villages under its administration.

The village is most famous as the origin of the eponymous brand of baijiu. The liquor is very popular in China. Maotai is the only alcoholic beverage presented as an official gift by Chinese embassies in foreign countries and regions, and it received worldwide exposure when Zhou Enlai used the liquor to entertain Richard Nixon during the state banquet for the U.S. presidential visit to China in 1972.

== See also ==
- List of township-level divisions of Guizhou
