= Chishui River =

Coordinates: 28.8002°N 105.8488°E

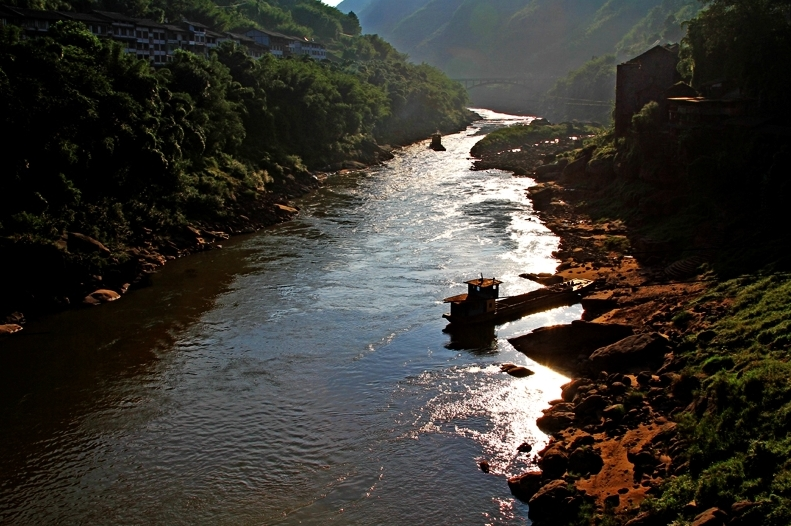
- Chishui River
- Native name: 赤水河 (Chinese)

Location
- Country: China
- Provinces: Yunnan; Guizhou; Sichuan

Physical characteristics
- Source
  - location: Mangbu, Zhengxiong County, Yunnan
  - elevation: 6,550 ft (2,000 m)
- Mouth: Yangtze River
  - location: Hejiang County, Sichuan
  - elevation: 1,345 ft (410 m)
- Length: 325 mi (523 km)

Chishui River (Chinese: 赤水河; pinyin: Chìshuǐ Hé; historically, 赤水; Chìshuǐ) is a major tributary of the upper Yangtze. Its name literally means "red water river"/"red river" (Note: 水 historically meant either water - the chemical substance - or a river - a natural flowing watercourse.) because it shows reddish color in lower stream due to a large sediment concentration. With the source in Yunnan Province, it forms part of the boundary between the provinces of Guizhou and Sichuan and flows into Yangtze River in Sichuan. It is sometimes called the River of Wines since there are several types of famous Chinese wines, including Lang Wine, Xi Wine and Maotai, originated along the river.

It is also known as the field of a major battle (the Four Crossings of Chishui) commanded by Mao Zedong in 1935 during the Long March of the Red Army. The Jiming Three Provinces Bridge is being built where 3 provinces of Sichuan, Guizhou, and Yunnan meet.
