= Kweichow Moutai =

Chinese baijiu distillery

Kweichow Moutai 贵州茅台
- Type: Public; State-Owned Enterprise
- Traded as: SSE: 600519; CSI A50
- Industry: Alcohol industry
- Founded: 1951; 75 years ago
- Headquarters: Maotai, Renhuai, Guizhou, China
- Area served: Worldwide
- Key people: Chen Hua (Committee Secretary) (Chairman)
- Products: Baijiu; Maotai
- Revenue: ▲(2022); CN¥124.1 billion US$18.96 billion
- Owner: Guizhou SASAC (60.82%)
- Number of employees: 31,413 (2022)
- Subsidiaries: bdaxsa
- Website: moutaichina.com

Kweichow Moutai
- Simplified Chinese: 贵州茅台
- Traditional Chinese: 貴州茅台
- Literal meaning: Guizhou Maotai
Transcriptions
Standard Mandarin
- Hanyu Pinyin: guì zhōu máo tái
- Wade–Giles: kuei^{4} chou^{1} mao^{2} t'ai^{2}

Kweichow Moutai Co. Ltd. (Chinese: 贵州茅台酒股份有限公司), commonly referred to as Kweichow Moutai (Chinese: 贵州茅台; pinyin: Guìzhōu Máotái), is a Chinese company specializing in the production, sale, and distribution of Maotai liquor, a particular style of jiangxiang (Chinese: 酱香; lit. 'sauce aroma') baijiu.

The company was established 1951, and is a recognized brand of baijiu both within China and abroad. The spirit is often presented at large diplomatic events with foreign dignitaries such as the dinner for US President Nixon's 1972 visit to China, as well as Xi Jinping's and Barack Obama's 2013 bilateral meeting in California. At a state dinner with Deng Xiaoping, US diplomat Henry Kissinger was quoted as saying, "I think if we drink enough Moutai, we can solve anything."

Sitting at 181 on Fortune 500 China, the distillery is the largest non-technology company in China and one of the most valuable spirits brand worldwide.

== History ==
The spirit itself has history dating back for centuries. In Maotai, Guizhou, there were three private distilleries (Chengyi, Ronghe, and Hengxing) which the Chinese government merged in 1951 to create a state-owned enterprise called Kweichow Moutai. The company was later incorporated as the Moutai Group in 1998 and listed on the Shanghai Stock Exchange in 2001.

Camus became the worldwide distributor in 2004.

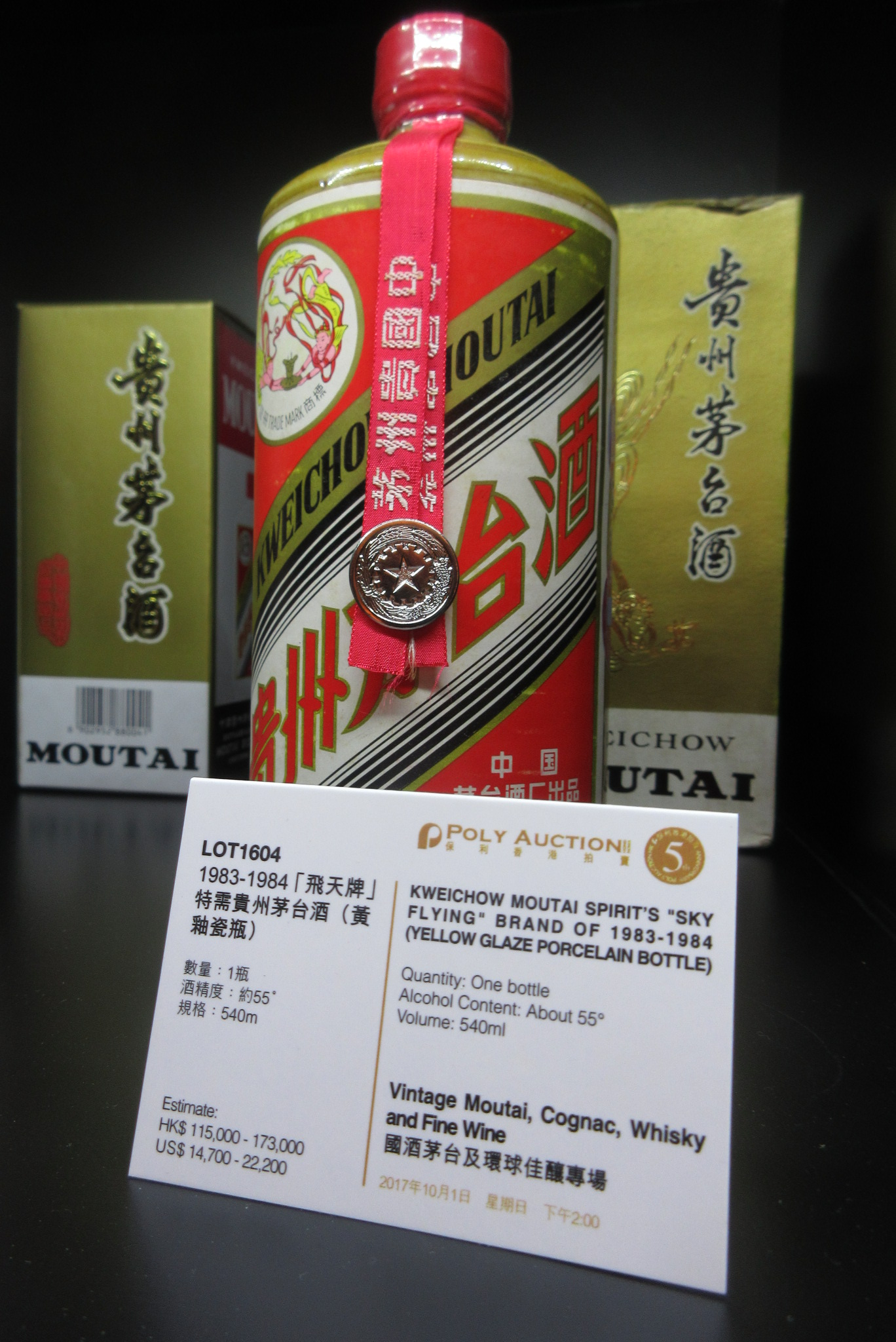
A bottle of Maotai produced in 1983-1984 has an estimated price range of HK$115,000-173,000 (US$14,700-22,200) in an auction in Hong Kong in 2017.

== Corporate affairs ==
The key trends for Kweichow Moutai are (as of the financial year ending 31 December):

	Revenue (USD billion)	EBIT (USD billion)
2015	5.29	3.50
2016	6.00	3.59
2017	9.12	5.77
2018	11.57	7.58
2019	12.83	8.56
2020	14.30	9.70
2021	16.93	11.52
2022	18.88	12.99
2023	21.28	14.66
2024	24.17	16.60
