= Renhuai =

Renhuai 仁怀市
- County-level & Sub-prefectural city
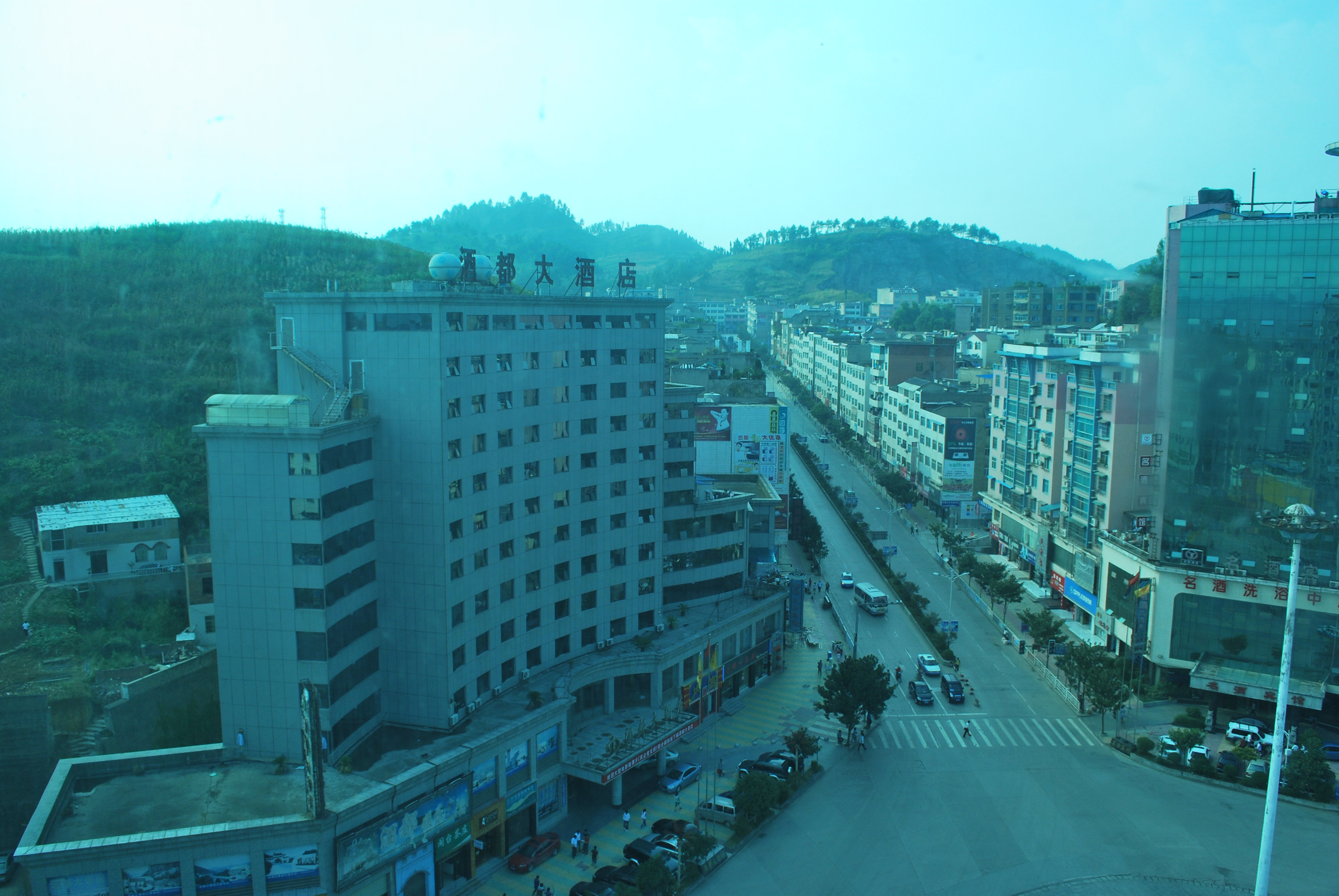

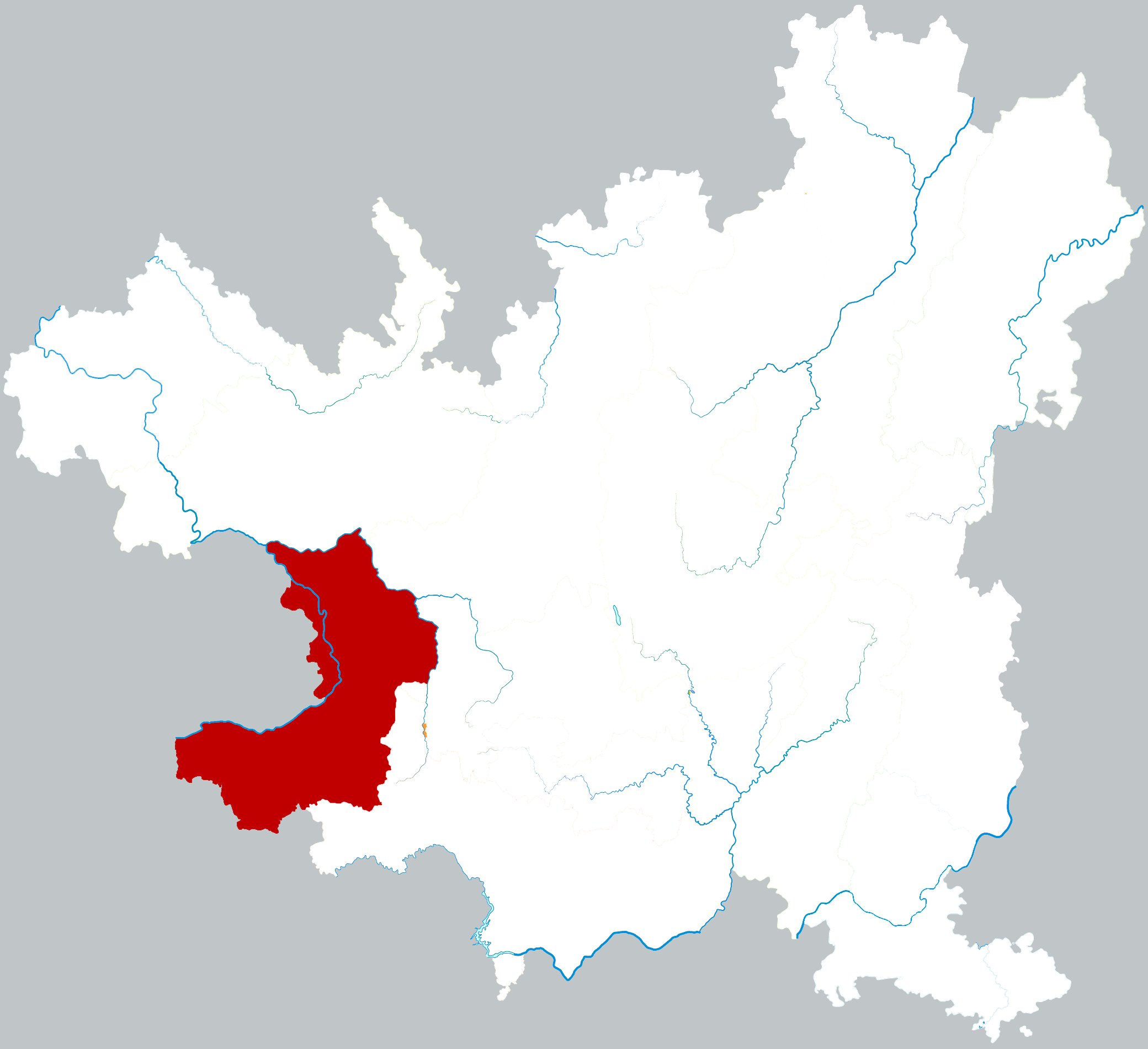

- Location of the seat in Guizhou Renhuai (Southwest China)
- Coordinates (Renhuai municipal government): 27°47′31″N 106°24′05″E
- Country: China
- Province: Guizhou
- Prefecture-level city: Zunyi
- Municipal seat: Yanjin Subdistrict

Area
  - Total: 1,789.53 km^{2} (690.94 sq mi)

Population (2010)
  - Total: 546,241
  - Density: 305.243/km^{2} (790.575/sq mi)
- Time zone: UTC+8 (China Standard)

Renhuai (simplified Chinese: 仁怀; traditional Chinese: 仁懷; pinyin: Rénhuái) is a county-level city located in the north of Guizhou province, China, bordering Sichuan province to the west. It is under the administration of the prefecture-level city of Zunyi. The city is served by Zunyi Maotai Airport.

== Administrative divisions ==
Renhuai is divided into 5 subdistricts, 14 towns and 1 ethnic township:

subdistricts

- Yanjin Subdistrict 盐津街道
- Zhongshu Subdistrict 中枢街道
- Canglong Subdistrict 苍龙街道
- Tanchang Subdistrict 坛厂街道
- Luban Subdistrict 鲁班街道

towns

- Changgang Town 长岗镇
- Wuma Town 五马镇
- Maoba Town 茅坝镇
- Jiucang Town 九仓镇
- Xitou Town 喜头镇
- Daba Town 大坝镇
- Sanhe Town 三合镇
- Hema Town 合马镇
- Huoshi Town 火石镇
- Xuekong Town 学孔镇
- Longjing Town 龙井镇
- Meijiuhe Town 美酒河镇
- Gaodaping Town 高大坪镇
- Maotai Town 茅台镇

ethnic township

- Houshan Miao and Bouyei Ethnic Township 后山苗族布依族乡

== Climate ==
Climate data for Renhuai, elevation 890 m (2,920 ft), (1991–2020 normals, extremes 1981–2010)
Month	Jan	Feb	Mar	Apr	May	Jun	Jul	Aug	Sep	Oct	Nov	Dec	Year
Record high °C (°F)	23.0 (73.4)	30.4 (86.7)	33.4 (92.1)	34.7 (94.5)	37.4 (99.3)	35.1 (95.2)	36.1 (97.0)	38.0 (100.4)	38.3 (100.9)	33.5 (92.3)	28.2 (82.8)	23.1 (73.6)	38.3 (100.9)
Mean daily maximum °C (°F)	7.9 (46.2)	11.1 (52.0)	16.1 (61.0)	21.6 (70.9)	25.1 (77.2)	27.1 (80.8)	30.3 (86.5)	30.5 (86.9)	26.3 (79.3)	19.9 (67.8)	15.7 (60.3)	9.7 (49.5)	20.1 (68.2)
Daily mean °C (°F)	5.2 (41.4)	7.6 (45.7)	11.9 (53.4)	16.8 (62.2)	20.3 (68.5)	22.7 (72.9)	25.6 (78.1)	25.3 (77.5)	21.8 (71.2)	16.5 (61.7)	12.2 (54.0)	6.8 (44.2)	16.1 (60.9)
Mean daily minimum °C (°F)	3.4 (38.1)	5.4 (41.7)	9.0 (48.2)	13.5 (56.3)	16.8 (62.2)	19.7 (67.5)	22.2 (72.0)	21.7 (71.1)	18.6 (65.5)	14.2 (57.6)	9.8 (49.6)	4.9 (40.8)	13.3 (55.9)
Record low °C (°F)	−3.8 (25.2)	−2.9 (26.8)	−1.5 (29.3)	3.7 (38.7)	7.8 (46.0)	12.8 (55.0)	14.3 (57.7)	15.1 (59.2)	10.9 (51.6)	4.8 (40.6)	−0.5 (31.1)	−3.1 (26.4)	−3.8 (25.2)
Average precipitation mm (inches)	30.2 (1.19)	25.4 (1.00)	47.2 (1.86)	78.8 (3.10)	134.1 (5.28)	172.9 (6.81)	159.2 (6.27)	115.0 (4.53)	104.0 (4.09)	99.2 (3.91)	42.6 (1.68)	29.4 (1.16)	1,038 (40.88)
Average precipitation days (≥ 0.1 mm)	15.9	14.0	15.4	15.8	18.3	17.6	13.2	12.8	13.1	18.0	14.1	15.1	183.3
Average snowy days	3.4	1.8	0.1	0	0	0	0	0	0	0	0	0.7	6
Average relative humidity (%)	83	80	77	76	76	80	74	72	75	82	81	83	78
Mean monthly sunshine hours	26.9	40.9	71.6	99.0	110.7	98.7	179.8	178.9	121.1	62.4	59.4	38.6	1,088
Percentage possible sunshine	8	13	19	26	26	24	43	44	33	18	19	12	24
Source: China Meteorological Administration
