= Moutai Institute =

Higher education institution in China

Coordinates: 27.7405°N 106.3319°E

- 茅台学院
- Former names: Moutai University
- Type: Private
- Established: 2017
- Chairperson: Gao Weidong (高卫东)
- President: Feng Xiaolun (封孝伦)
- Undergraduates: 1,749 (Summer 2019)
- Location: Renhuai, Guizhou, China
- Campus: Suburban, 0.346 km^{2} (0.134 sq mi)
- Website: mtxy.edu.cn

Moutai Institute
- Simplified Chinese: 茅台学院
- Traditional Chinese: 茅台學院
- Literal meaning: Maotai College
Transcriptions
Standard Mandarin
- Hanyu Pinyin: Máotái Xuéyuàn

Moutai Institute (Chinese: 茅台学院), formerly known as Moutai University, is a private alcohol-centered higher education institution in Renhuai, Guizhou, Southwest China.

The institute is established by Kweichow Moutai Group, the parent company of Kweichow Moutai, the producer of Moutai, known as the "national liquor" of China. The establishment of the institute aims at addressing the lack of technical skills and talent in the liquor industry of China. The preparatory work to establish Moutai Institute began in 2012, and approved by the Ministry of Education of China in May 2017.

There are five majors in the institute – including distilling, wine-making, food quality and safety, resource recycling science and engineering, and marketing. The campus of the institute covers an area of 72 hectares. Some instructors are senior professionals from Moutai Group. The first class was enrolled from the natives of Guizhou in 2017.
