= Guizhou =

Province in Southwestern China

Guizhou 贵州 Kweichow
- Province of Guizhou

Name transcription(s)
  - Chinese: 贵州省 (Guìzhōu Shěng)
  - Abbreviation: GZ / 黔 or 贵 (pinyin: Qián or Guì)
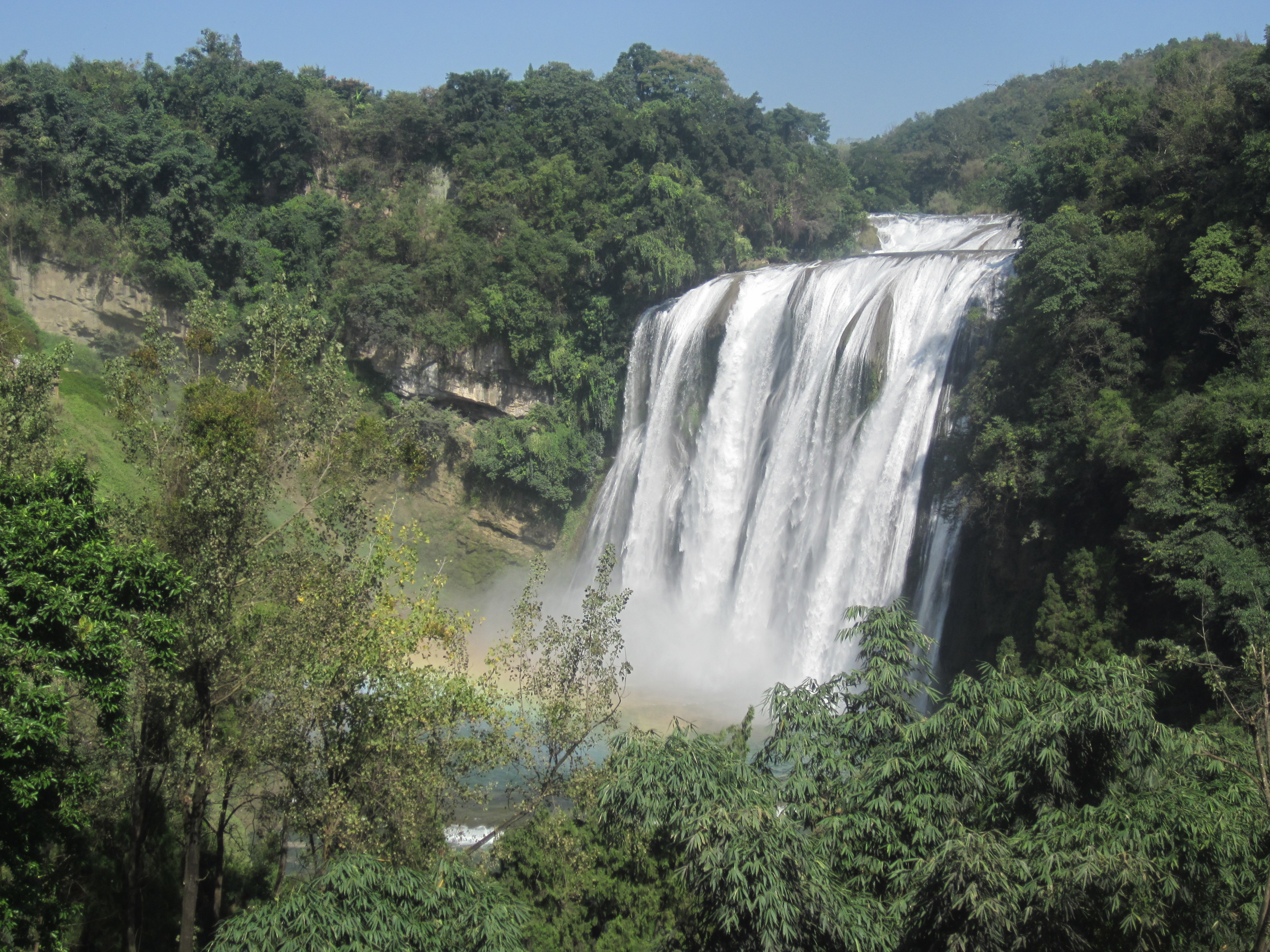
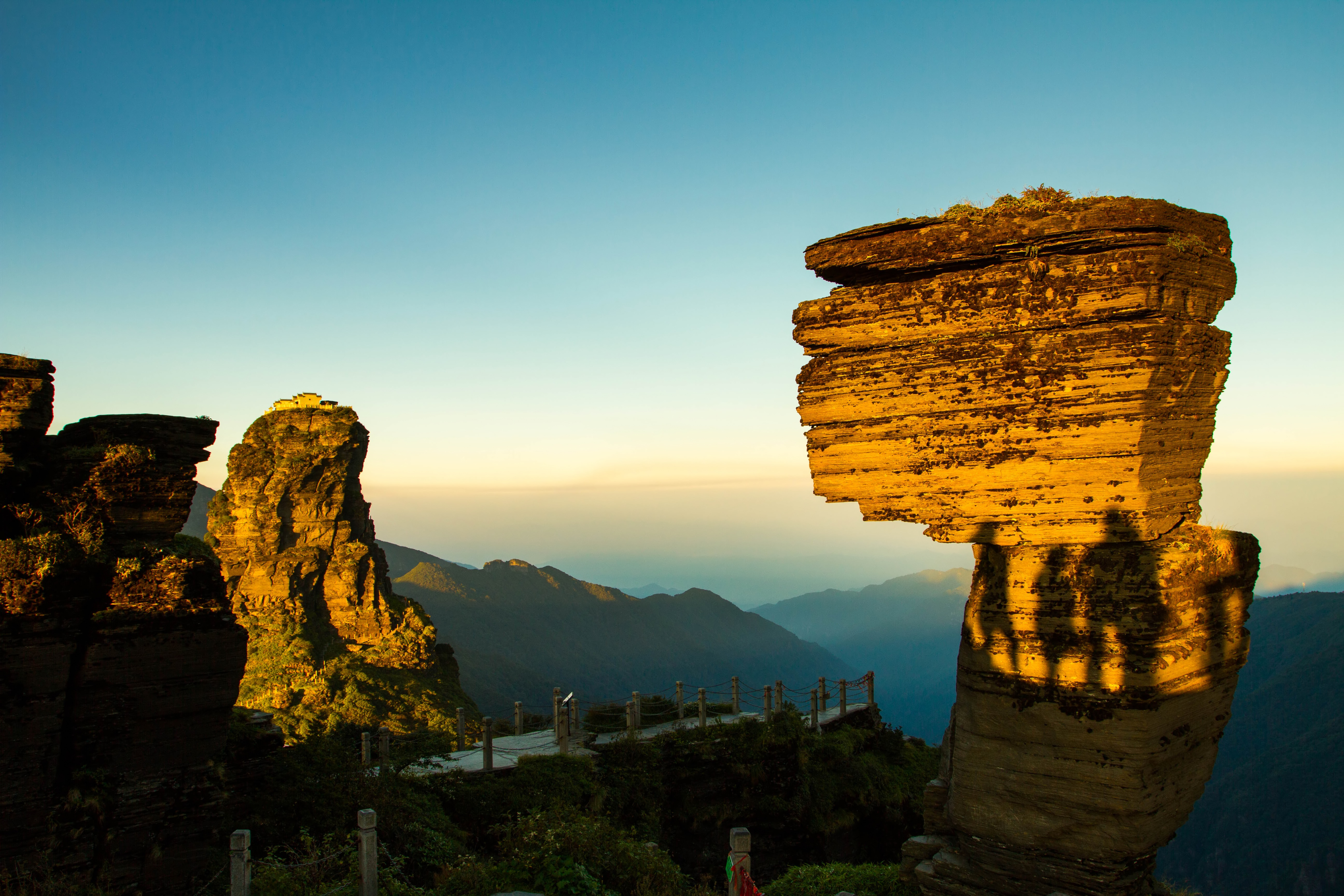
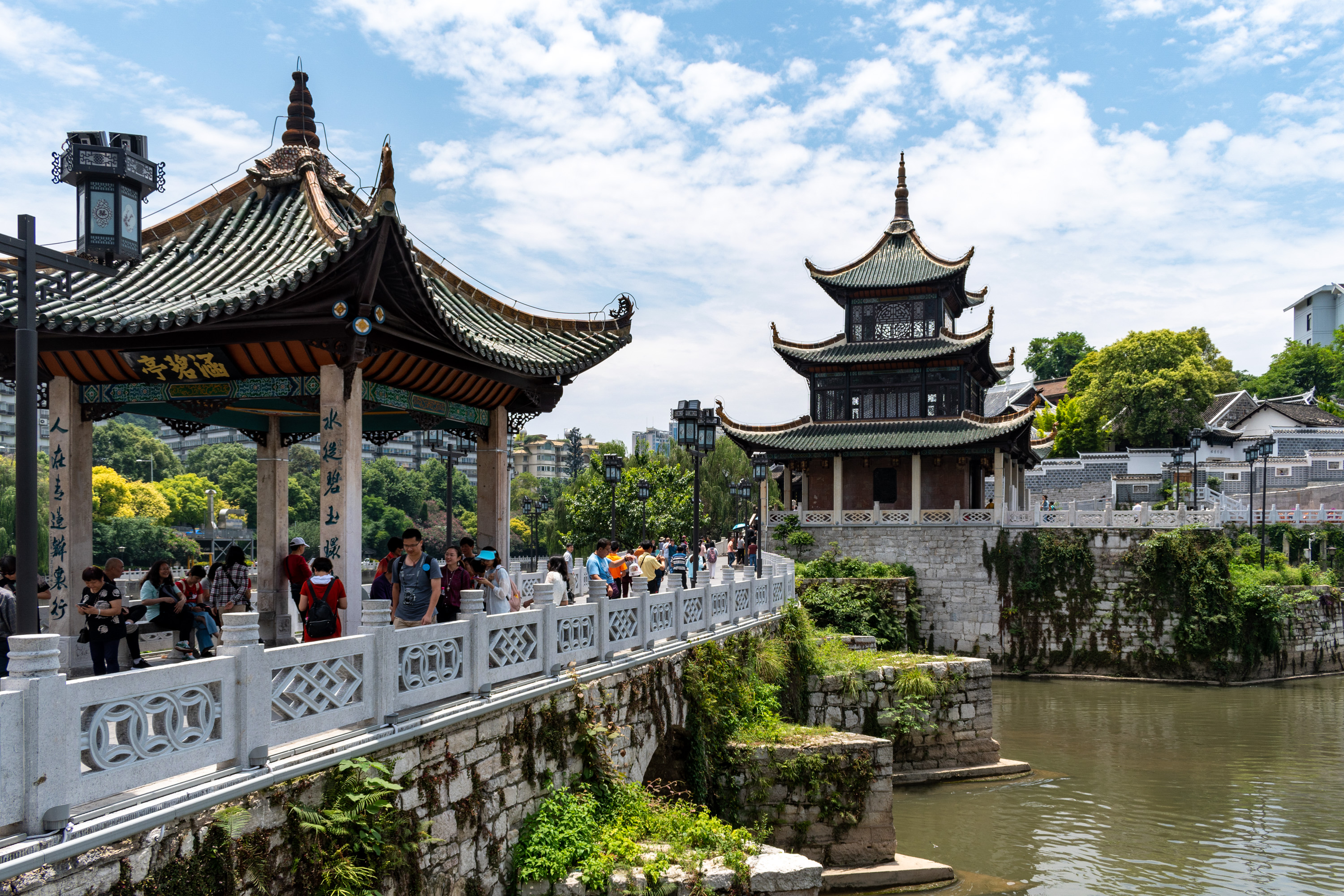
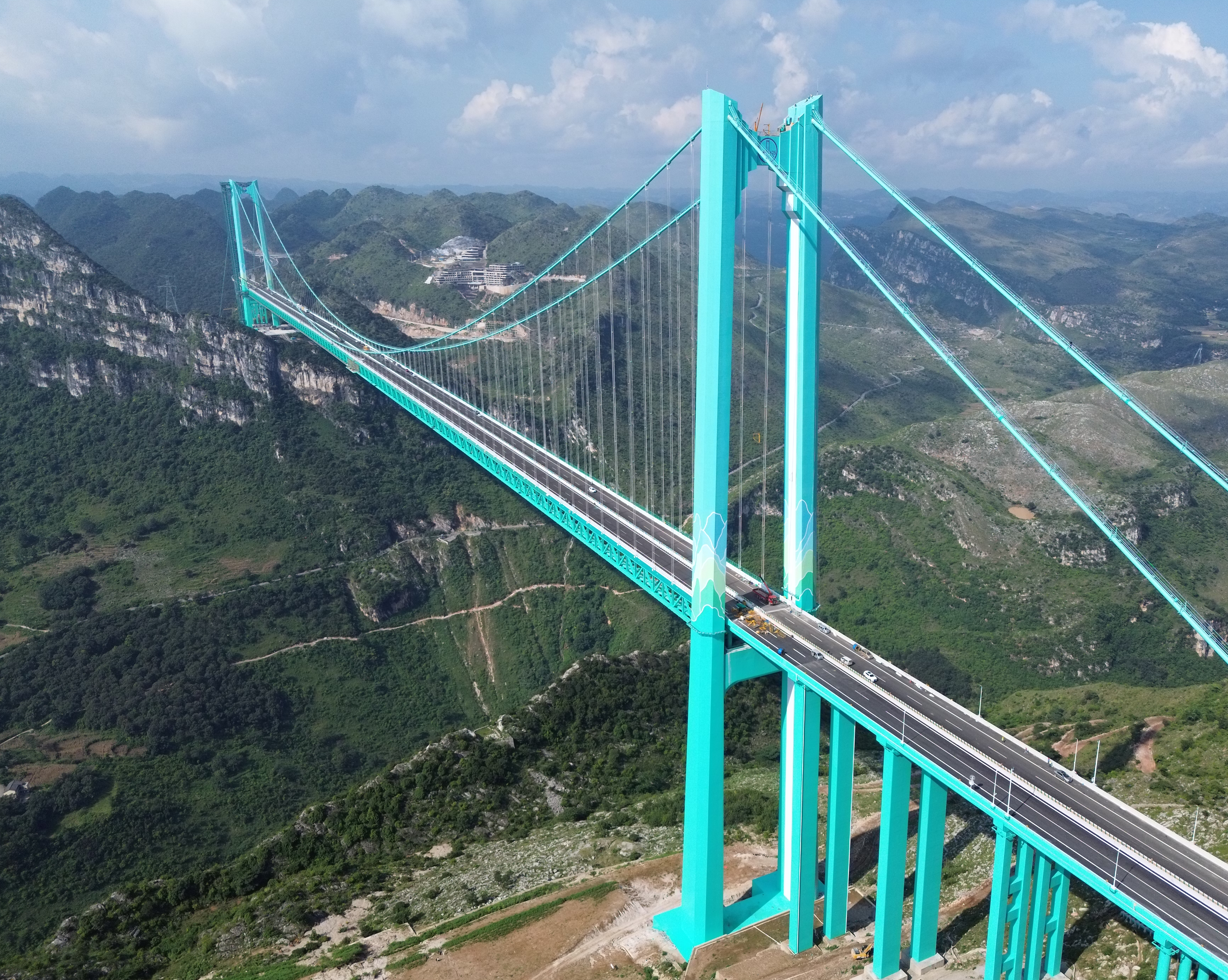
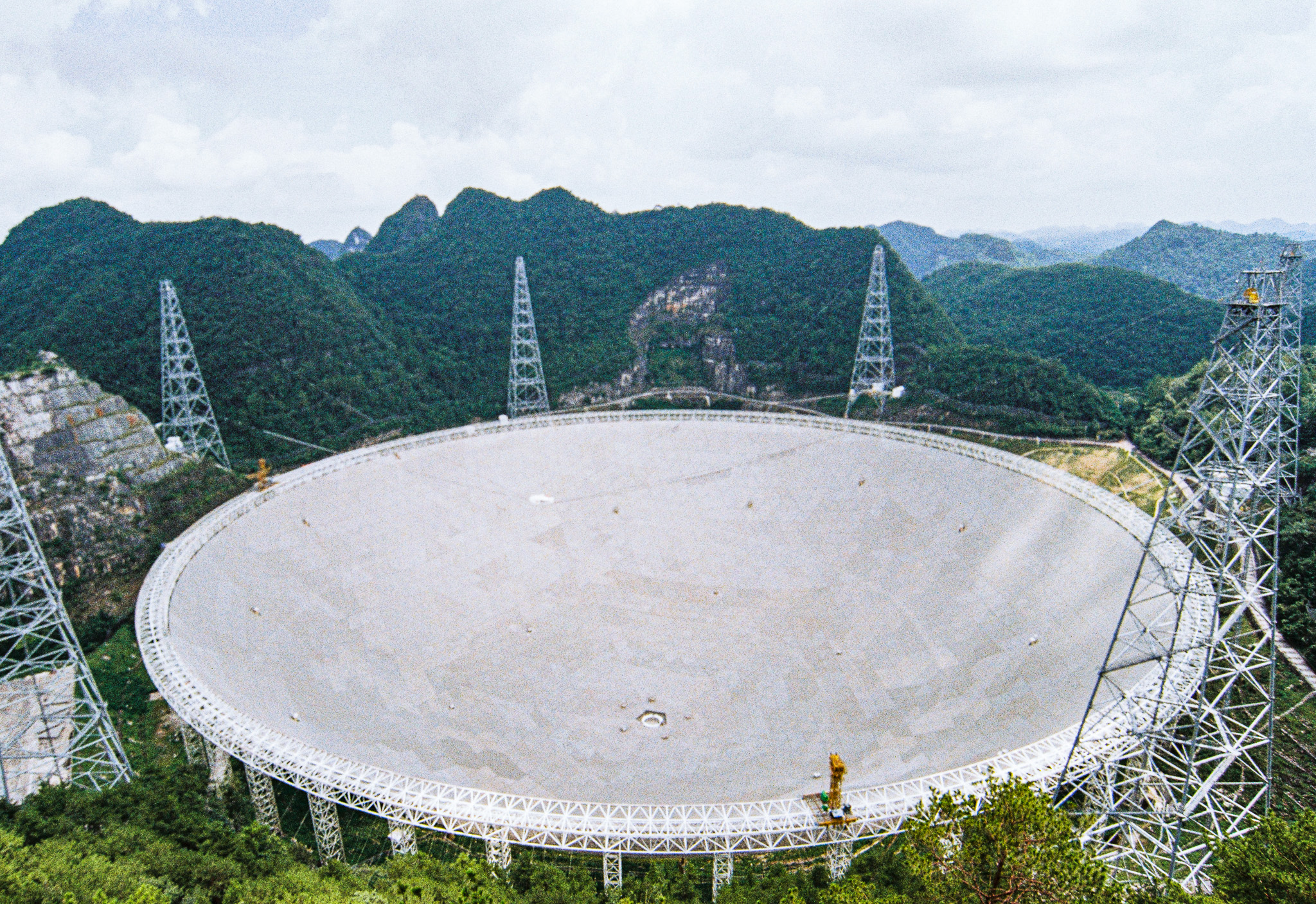
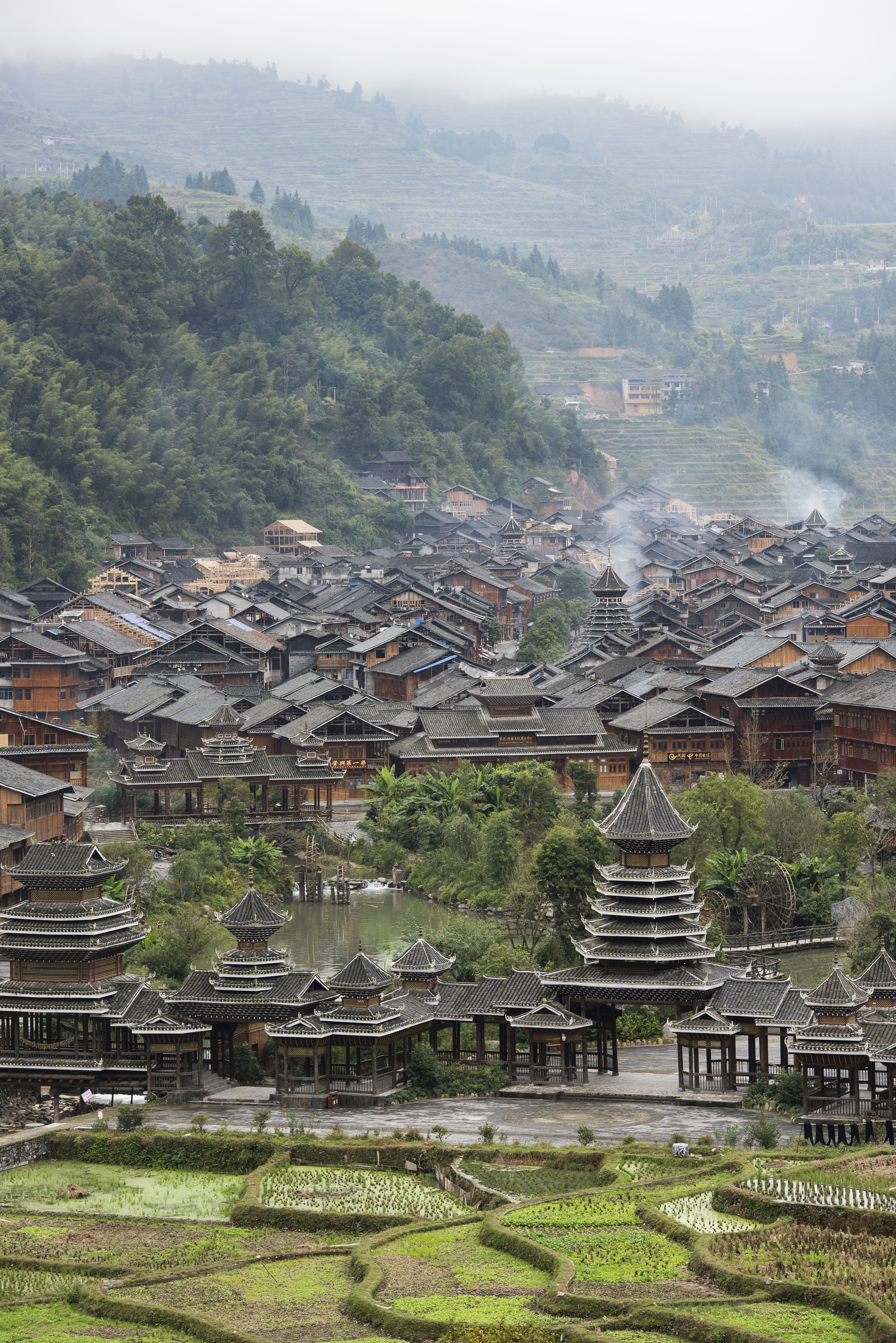
- Huangguoshu Waterfall Fanjingshan Guiyang Huajiang Canyon Bridge FAST Zhaoxing

- Map showing the location of Guizhou Province
- Coordinates: 26°50′N 106°50′E
- Country: China
- Named for: Gui – Gui Mountains zhou (prefecture)
- Capital: Guiyang
- Largest city: Zunyi
- Divisions: 9 prefectures, 88 counties, 1539 townships

Government
  - Type: Province
  - Body: Guizhou Provincial People's Congress
  - Party Secretary: Xu Lin
  - Congress chairman: Xu Lin
  - Governor: Li Bingjun
  - CPPCC chairman: Zhao Yongqing
  - National People's Congress Representation: 71 deputies

Area
  - Total: 176,167 km^{2} (68,018 sq mi)
  - Rank: 16th
- Highest elevation (Jiucaiping): 2,900 m (9,500 ft)

Population (2020)
  - Total: 38,562,148
  - Rank: 17th
  - Density: 218.895/km^{2} (566.937/sq mi)
  - Rank: 18th

Demographics
  - Ethnic composition: Han – 62%; Miao – 12%; Buyei – 8%; Dong – 5%; Tujia – 4%; Yi – 2%; Undistinguished – 2%; Gelao – 2%; Sui – 1%
  - Languages and dialects: Southwestern Mandarin, Standard Chinese

GDP (2023)
  - Total: CN¥ 2,356 billion (22nd); US$330 billion
  - Per capita: CN¥61,066 (28th); US$8,549
- ISO 3166 code: CN-GZ
- HDI (2023): 0.734 (28th) – high
- Website: http://www.gzgov.gov.cn (Simplified Chinese)

Guizhou
- "Guizhou" in Simplified (top) and Traditional (bottom) Chinese characters

Chinese name
- Simplified Chinese: 贵州
- Traditional Chinese: 貴州
- Hanyu Pinyin: Guìzhōu
- Postal: Kweichow
Transcriptions
Standard Mandarin
- Hanyu Pinyin: Guìzhōu
- Bopomofo: ㄍㄨㄟˋ ㄓㄡ
- Gwoyeu Romatzyh: Gueyjou
- Wade–Giles: Kuei^{4}-chou^{1}
- Yale Romanization: Gwèijōu
- IPA: [kwêɪ.ʈʂóʊ]
Wu
- Romanization: Kwae-tseu
Yue: Cantonese
- Yale Romanization: Gwaijàu or Gwaijāu
- Jyutping: Gwai3zau1
- IPA: [kʷɐj˧.tsɐw˥˧] or [kʷɐj˧.tsɐw˥]
Southern Min
- Hokkien POJ: Kùi-chiu

Zhuang name
- Zhuang: Gveicouh 贵州

Bouyei name
- Bouyei: Gvisxul

Yi name
- Yi: ꇭꍏ

Guizhou (Note: /ɡweɪˈdʒoʊ/; Chinese: 贵州; formerly Kweichow) is an inland province in Southwestern China with its capital and largest city as Guiyang, located in the center of the province. Guizhou borders the Guangxi Zhuang Autonomous Region to the south, Yunnan to the west, Sichuan to the northwest, the municipality of Chongqing to the north, and Hunan to the east. Guizhou has a humid subtropical climate. It covers a total area of 176,200 square kilometers and consists of six prefecture-level cities and three autonomous prefectures. The population of Guizhou stands at 38.5 million, ranking 18th among the provinces in China.

The Dian Kingdom, which inhabited the present-day area of Guizhou, was annexed by the Han dynasty in 106 BC. Guizhou was formally made a province in 1413 during the Ming dynasty. After the overthrow of the Qing in 1911 and following the Chinese Civil War, the Chinese Communist Party took refuge in Guizhou during the Long March between 1934 and 1935. After the establishment of the People's Republic of China, Mao Zedong promoted the relocation of heavy industry into inland provinces such as Guizhou, to better protect them from potential foreign attacks.

Located in the hinterland of the southwestern inland region, Guizhou is a transportation hub in the southwest area and an important part of the Yangtze River Economic Belt. It is the country's first national-level comprehensive pilot zone for big data, a mountain tourism destination and a major mountain tourism province, a national ecological civilization pilot zone, and an inland open economic pilot zone.

The representative historical culture is "Qian Gui culture" (黔贵文化). In addition, Guizhou is also one of the birthplaces of ancient Chinese humans and ancient Chinese culture, with people having lived on this land since about half a million years ago.

Guizhou is rich in natural, cultural and environmental resources. Its natural industry includes timber and forestry, and the energy and mining industries constitute an important part of its economy. Notwithstanding, Guizhou is considered a relatively undeveloped province, with the fourth-lowest GDP per capita in China as of 2020. However, it is also one of China's fastest-growing economies. The Chinese government is looking to develop Guizhou as a data hub.

Guizhou is a mountainous province, with its higher altitudes in the west and centre. It lies at the eastern end of the Yungui Plateau. Demographically, it is one of China's most diverse provinces. Minority groups account for more than 37% of the population, including sizable populations of the Miao, Bouyei, Dong, Tujia and Yi peoples, all of whom speak languages distinct from Chinese. The main language spoken in Guizhou is Southwestern Mandarin, a variety of Mandarin.

== Name ==
The area was first organized as an administrative region of a Chinese empire under the Tang, when it was named Juzhou (矩州), pronounced Kjú-jyuw in the Middle Chinese of the period. During the Mongol-led Yuan dynasty, the character 矩 (ju, "carpenter's square") was changed to the more refined 貴 (gui, "precious or expensive"). The region formally became a province in 1413; the capital of the province was originally called "Guizhou", but it is currently known as Guiyang.

== History ==
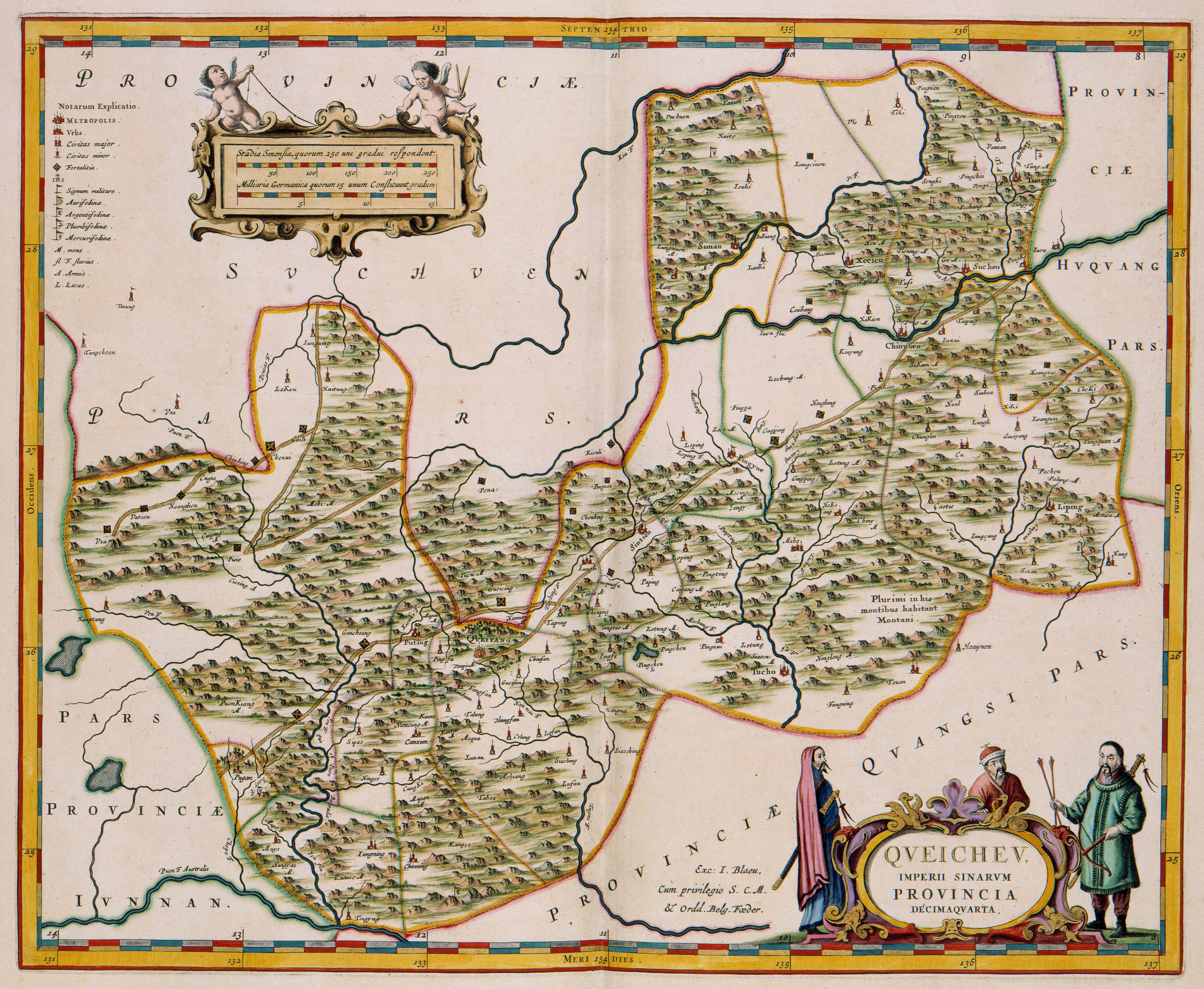
Guizhou in 1655.

Evidence of settlement by humans during the Middle Palaeolithic is indicated by stone artefacts, including Levallois pieces, found during archaeological excavations at Guanyindong Cave. These artefacts have been dated to approximately 170,000–80,000 years ago using optically stimulated luminescence methods.

From around 1046 BC to the emergence of the State of Qin, northwest Guizhou was part of the State of Shu. During the Warring States period, the Chinese state of Chu conquered the area, and control later passed to the Dian Kingdom. During the Chinese Han dynasty (206 BC–220 AD), to which the Dian was tributary, Guizhou was home to the Yelang collection of tribes, which largely governed themselves before the Han consolidated control in the southwest and established the Lingnan province. During the Three Kingdoms period, parts of Guizhou were governed by the Shu Han state based in Sichuan, followed by Cao Wei (220–266) and the Jin dynasty (266–420).

During the 8th and 9th centuries in the Tang dynasty, Chinese soldiers moved into Guizhou (Kweichow) and married native women. Their descendants are known as Lǎohànrén (老汉人), in contrast to new Chinese who populated Guizhou at later times. They still speak an archaic dialect. Many immigrants to Guizhou were descended from these soldiers in garrisons who married these pre-Chinese women.

Kublai Khan and Möngke Khan conquered the Chinese southwest in the process of defeating the Song during the Mongol invasion of China, and the newly established Yuan dynasty (1279–1368) saw the importation of Chinese Muslim administrators and settlers from Bukhara in Central Asia.

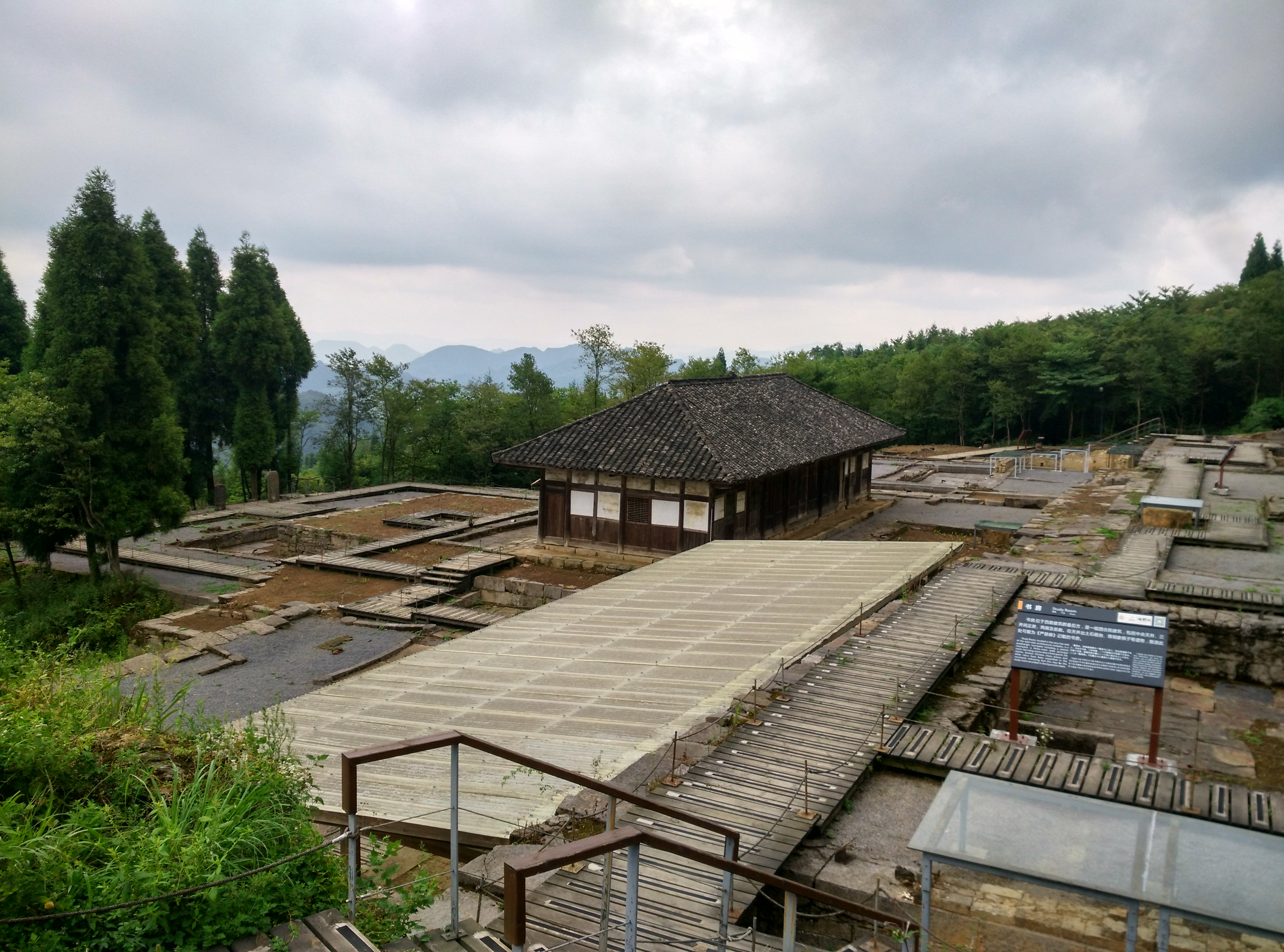
In 1600, Hailongtun fortress in Zunyi saw the last battle of the 10-year-long Bozhou Rebellion.

It was during the following Ming dynasty, which was once again led by Han Chinese, that Guizhou was formally made a province in 1413. The Ming established many garrisons in Guizhou from which to pacify the Yao and Miao minorities during the Miao Rebellions. Chinese-style agriculture flourished with the expertise of farmers from Sichuan, Hunan and its surrounding provinces into Guizhou. Wu Sangui was responsible for the ousting the Ming in Guizhou and Yunnan during the Manchu conquest of China. During the governorship-general of the Qing dynasty's nobleman Ortai, the tusi system of indirect governance of the southwest was abolished, prompting rebellions from disenfranchised chieftains and the further centralization of government. After the Second Opium War, criminal triads set up shop in Guangxi and Guizhou to sell British opium. For a time, Taiping Rebels took control of Guizhou, but they were ultimately suppressed by the Qing. Concurrently, Han Chinese soldiers moved into the Taijiang region of Guizhou, married Miao women, and their children were brought up as Miao.

More unsuccessful Miao rebellions occurred during the Qing, in 1735, from 1795–1806 and from 1854–1873. After the overthrow of the Qing in 1911 and following Chinese Civil War, the Communists took refuge in Guizhou during the Long March (1934–1935). While the province was formally ruled by the warlord Wang Jialie, the Zunyi Conference in Guizhou established Mao Zedong as the leader of the Communist Party. As the Second Sino-Japanese War pushed China's Nationalist Government to its southwest base of Chongqing, transportation infrastructure improved as Guizhou was linked with the Burma Road. After the end of the War, a 1949 Revolution swept Mao into power, who promoted the relocation of heavy industry into inland provinces such as Guizhou, to better protect them from Soviet and American attacks. The 1957 influenza pandemic started in Guizhou and killed a million people around the world. After the reform and opening up began in 1978, geographical factors led Guizhou to become the poorest province in China, with a GDP growth average of 9 percent from 1978 to 1993.

== District planning ==
Regional history

In the 26th year of the Republic of China (1937), Guizhou established six administrative supervision areas, each in charge of several counties. In the 30th year (1941), Guiyang City was established. By the 37th year (1948), Guizhou had one direct jurisdiction area, six administrative supervision areas, and 78 counties (cities) under its administration.

On November 15, 1949, the Second Field Army of the Chinese People's Liberation Army liberated Guiyang; on December 26, the People's Government of Guizhou Province was established. In the early period after liberation, the province had one directly managed city, eight special areas, and one special area city, totalling 79 counties.

In April 1956, the Guiyang, Zhenyuan, and Duyun special areas were abolished, and the Qiandongnan Miao and Dong Autonomous Prefecture and the Qiannan Buyi and Miao Autonomous Prefecture were established, with their administrative centers in Kaili (the Qiandongnan Miao and Dong Autonomous Prefecture was established in Zhenyuan on July 23 of the same year and later moved to Kaili in 1958). In 1956, two villages from Qijiang County (綦江县), Sichuan Province, were transferred to Xishui County (习水县), Guizhou Province.

In 1960, the Langdai County (朗岱县) in Anshun Special Area was abolished and Liuzhi City was established, which was later changed back to Liuzhi County.

In 1965, the city status of Duyun was restored, serving as the capital of the Qiannan Buyi and Miao Autonomous Prefecture.

In 1966, on the basis of Liuzhi County (六枝县) in the former Anshun Special Area, Shuicheng County (水城县) in the Bijie Special Area, and Pan County in the Xingyi Special Area, Liuzhi Industrial and Mining Area, Shuicheng Industrial and Mining Area, and Pan County Industrial and Mining Area were established.

In 1970, the Wanshan Special District was established, under the jurisdiction of Tongren Special Area. The Liuzhi, Pan County, and Shuicheng industrial and mining areas and their original counties were merged into Liuzhi Special District, Pan County Special District, and Shuicheng Special District.

In December 1978, the Liupanshui Special Area was abolished and the prefecture-level city of Liupanshui was established, governing three special districts, with the municipal government located in Shuicheng Special District, becoming the second prefecture-level city in Guizhou Province.

In September 1981, the Xingyi Special Area was abolished and the Qiannan Buyi and Miao Autonomous Prefecture was established, with its administrative center in Xingyi.

In 1983, Kaili County in the Qiandongnan Miao and Dong Autonomous Prefecture was abolished and the county-level Kaili City was established, serving as the capital of the autonomous prefecture.

In 1987, the Shuicheng Special District in Liupanshui City was abolished and Shuicheng County and Zhongshan District were established, with the Liupanshui municipal government moving to Zhongshan District; on August 21, Tongren County was abolished and Tongren City was established; on November 6, with the approval of the State Council, Xingyi County was abolished and Xingyi City was established.

In 1990, Chishui County in the Zunyi Special Area was abolished and the county-level Chishui City was established. Anshun City and Anshun County were merged to serve as the administrative center of Anshun Special Area.

In 1992, the Pan County Special District in Liupanshui City was abolished and Pan County was established. Qingzhen County in the Anshun Special Area was abolished and the county-level Qingzhen City was established, still under the jurisdiction of Anshun Special Area.

In 1994, Renhuai County in the Zunyi Special Area was abolished and the county-level Renhuai City was established. Bijie County in the Bijie Special Area was abolished and the county-level Bijie City was established, serving as the administrative center of Bijie Special Area.

In 1996, Qingzhen City, Xiuwen County, Kaiyang County, and Xifeng County, originally belonging to the Anshun Special Area, were transferred to the jurisdiction of Guiyang City.

In 1997, the Zunyi Special Area was abolished and the prefecture-level city of Zunyi was established, with the original county-level Zunyi City being changed to Honghuagang District. In 2000, the Anshun Special Area was abolished and the prefecture-level city of Anshun was established, with the original county-level Anshun City being changed to Xixiu District.

In 2003, parts of the Honghuagang District in Zunyi City were divided to establish the Huichuan District of Zunyi City.

In 2011, the Tongren Special Area was abolished and the prefecture-level city of Tongren was established, with the original county-level Tongren City being changed to Bijiang District, and the original Wanshan Special District being changed to Wanshan District. Tongren City governs 2 districts and 8 counties. In the same year, the Bijie Special Area was abolished and the prefecture-level city of Bijie was established. The original county-level Bijie City was changed to Qixingguan District.

In 2013, a pilot model of provincial direct management of counties was implemented, with the county-level Renhuai City, originally belonging to Zunyi City, and Weining County, originally belonging to Bijie City, being designated as pilot counties for provincial direct management.

On January 6, 2014, the State Council agreed to establish the Guizhou Gui'an New District. In the same year, Pingba County in Anshun City was abolished and Pingba District of Anshun City was established.

In 2016, Zunyi County in Zunyi City was abolished and the district-level Bozhou District was established.

In April 2017, the Ministry of Civil Affairs agreed to abolish Pan County in Liupanshui City and establish the county-level Panzhou City, managed by Liupanshui City.

In August 2018, with the approval of the State Council, Xingren County in the Qiannan Buyi and Miao Autonomous Prefecture was abolished and the county-level Xingren City was established.

In July 2020, Shuicheng County in Liupanshui City was abolished and the district-level Shuicheng District was established.

In March 2021, with the approval of the State Council, the Ministry of Civil Affairs agreed to abolish Qianxi County and establish the county-level Qianxi City.

== Geography ==
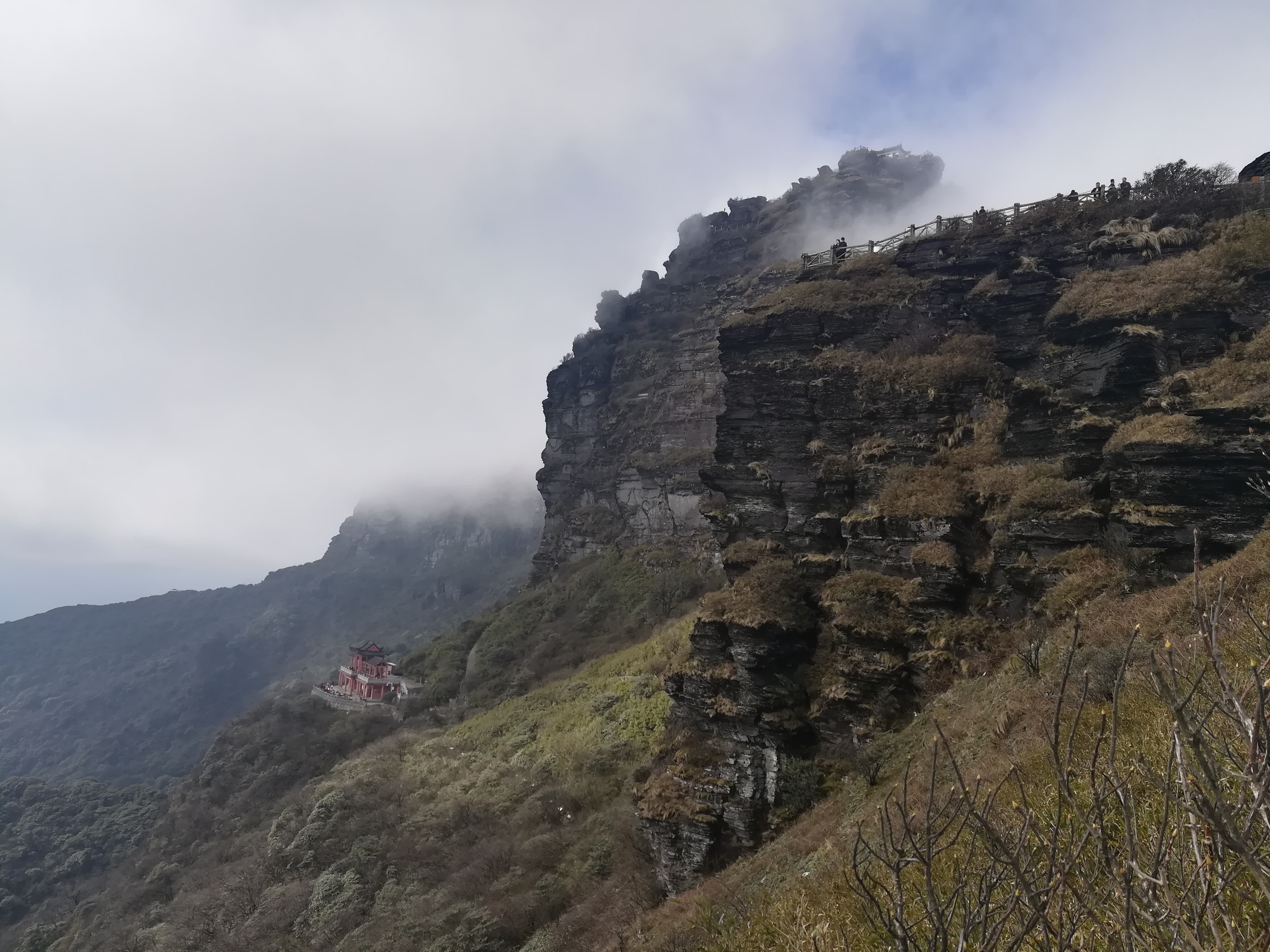
Mount Fanjing in Guizhou

A common cultural expression of Guizhou's geography is the saying, "The sunny weather never lasts for more than three days and the flat ground never continues for more than three miles."

=== Topography and landforms ===
Guizhou Province is located on the Yunnan-Guizhou Plateau, between longitudes 103°36′ to 109°35′ east and latitudes 24°37′ to 29°13′ north. The average altitude is around 1100 meters. It borders Hunan to the east, Guangxi to the south, Yunnan to the west, and Sichuan and Chongqing to the north. It stretches approximately 595 kilometers from east to west and about 509 kilometers from north to south. The total area of Guizhou Province is 176,167 square kilometers, accounting for 1.8% of the total area of China. The easternmost point is in Di Lake Township, Tianzhu County, Qiandongnan Prefecture. The westernmost point is in Yulong Township (玉龙乡), Weining County, Bijie City. The southernmost point is in Luowan Township (洛万乡), Xingyi City, Qianxinan Prefecture. The northernmost point is in Yangxi Town (阳溪镇), Daozhen County, Zunyi City.

Guizhou is a mountainous province, although its higher altitudes are in the west and centre. It lies at the eastern end of the Yungui Plateau. At 2,900 m (9,514 ft) above sea level, Jiucaiping is Guizhou's highest point.

Guizhou Plateau is predominantly mountainous, and its topography can be generally divided into three basic types: plateau mountains, hills, and basins (盆地), with 92.5% of the area being mountains and hills. There are numerous mountain ranges within the province, with overlapping ridges and peaks stretching across the landscape. In the north, there is the Dalou Mountain, which runs diagonally from the west to the northeast, with the important pass Loushan Pass at an altitude of 1444 meters; in the central and southern part, Miaoling Mountain(苗岭) Range stretches across, with its main peak, Leigong Mountain (雷公山), at 2178 meters; in the northeastern part, there is the Wuling Mountain Range, which winds into Guizhou from Hunan, with its main peak, Fanjing Mountain, at 2572 meters; in the west, there is the towering Wumeng Mountain (乌蒙山), with the highest point in Guizhou being Jiucaiping (韭菜坪) in Zhushi Township (珠市乡), Hezhang County, at an altitude of 2900.6 meters.

=== Climate ===
Guizhou has a humid subtropical climate. There are few seasonal changes. Its annual average temperature is roughly 10–20 °C (50–68 °F), with January temperatures ranging from 1–10 °C (34–50 °F) and July temperatures ranging from 17–28 °C (63–82 °F). with annual rainfall ranging from 1,000–1,400 mm (39–55 in); the frost-free period lasts between 250 and 300 days. There is no severe cold in winter and no extreme heat in summer, with the coldest month of January averaging 4–6 °C (39–43 °F), and the hottest month of July averaging 15–23 °C (59–73 °F). The unique climatic characteristics make Guizhou an ideal place for leisure travel and summer retreats. Precipitation is abundant, with a distinct rainy season, many cloudy days, and less sunshine, with the number of cloudy days generally exceeding 150 days throughout the year, and the annual relative humidity above 70%. Influenced by atmospheric circulation and terrain, Guizhou's climate is diverse. Additionally, the climate is unstable, with a variety of disastrous weather conditions such as droughts, autumn winds, freezing, and hail, which can have a significant impact on agricultural production.

Like in China's other southwest provinces, rural areas of Guizhou suffered severe drought during spring 2010. Beginning on 3 April 2010, China's premier Wen Jiabao went on a three-day inspection tour in the southwest drought-affected province of Guizhou, where he met villagers and called on agricultural scientists to develop drought-resistant technologies for the area.

Because of its lesser development compared to many other provinces in China, Guizhou's environment is well-preserved. As of 2023, its environment and favorable climate have been assets in attracting the new, increasingly digital, economy.

=== Hydrology ===
Guizhou Province's rivers are located in the upper reaches of the Yangtze River and Pearl River basins, with 69 counties falling within the scope of the Yangtze River protective forest conservation area, making it an important ecological barrier for the upper reaches of both the Yangtze and Pearl Rivers. The water system of the province flows from the west and center towards the north, east, and south according to the terrain. Miao Ridge serves as the watershed between the Yangtze and Pearl River basins; to the north lies the Yangtze River basin, covering an area of 115,747 square kilometers, accounting for 65.7% of the province's total land area, with major rivers including: Wu River, Chishui River, Qingshuijiang, Hongzhou River (洪州河), Wuyang River, Jinjiang, Songtao River (松桃河), Songkan River (松坎河), Niulan River (牛栏江), Hengjiang (横江), etc.; to the south of Miao Ridge lies the Pearl River basin, covering an area of 60,420 square kilometers, accounting for 34.3% of the province's total land area, with major rivers including: Nanpan River, Beipan River, Hongshui River, Duliu River, Dagou River (打狗河), etc. Guizhou has a large number of rivers with continuous flow, and there are 984 rivers with a length of more than 10 kilometers.

== Natural resources ==
=== Water resources ===
Guizhou Province has a large number of rivers, with 984 rivers that are over 10 kilometers long. In 2002, the runoff volume of Guizhou's rivers reached 114.52 billion cubic meters. The mountainous characteristics of Guizhou's rivers are evident, with most rivers having broad valleys and gentle water flow in the upper reaches, with small water volume; the middle reaches have alternating tight and open valleys with rapid water flow; the lower reaches have deep and narrow valleys, with large water volume and abundant hydropower resources. The potential of hydropower resources is 18.745 million kilowatts, ranking sixth in China, of which 16.833 million kilowatts are exploitable, accounting for 4.4% of China's total, with many concentrated river sections with large water level drops, and favorable development conditions.

=== Land resources ===
Guizhou Province's land resources are predominantly mountainous and hilly, with relatively few plains. The mountainous area is 108,740 square kilometers, accounting for 61.7% of the total land area of Guizhou Province. The hilly area is 54,197 square kilometers, accounting for 31.1% of the total land area of Guizhou Province. The area of mountainous flatlands is 13,230 square kilometers, only accounting for 7.5% of the total land area of Guizhou Province. There is a limited amount of land resources available for agricultural development. Due to the increasing population and the growth of non-agricultural land use, the area of arable land is continuously decreasing. By the end of 2002, the actual area of arable land in Guizhou Province was 17,694 square kilometers, a reduction of 629 square kilometers compared to 2001. The per capita area of arable land is less than 0.05 hectares, which is significantly lower than the national average of China. The proportion of arable land with thick soil layers, high fertility, and good water conditions is low.

=== Biological resources ===
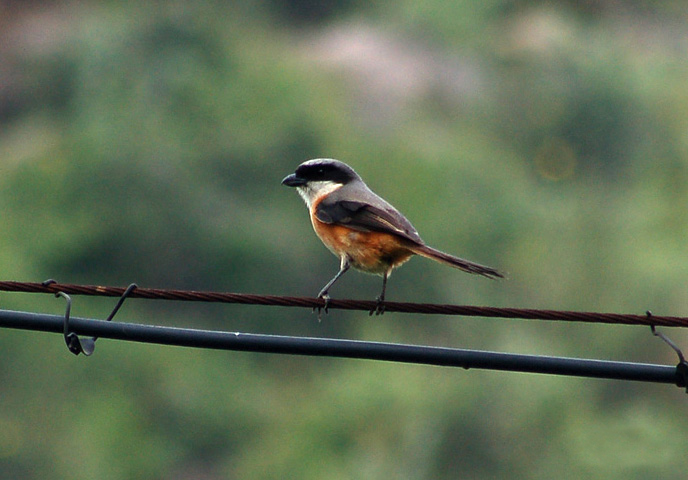
Grey-backed shrike at Caohai.

The border mountains of Guizhou, Guangxi, and Hunan have been identified as one of the eight plant diversity hotspots in China. Guizhou Province is home to 9,982 species of vascular plants (including subspecies and varieties, the same below)， The main ecosystem types include evergreen broad-leaved forest, coniferous and broad-leaved mixed forest, and montane elfin forest. more than 700 of which are edible, and over 2,000 that are used for greening, beautification, and for pollution resistance and environmental improvement. Plant species endemic to this region include Abies ziyuanensis, Cathaya argyrophylla, and Keteleeria pubescens，Davidia involucrata, Guizhou Cycas. The province is also rich in wildlife resources, with 1,053 species of vertebrates, including 141 mammals, 509 birds, 104 reptiles, 74 amphibians, and 225 fish species. In broad terms, the Yunnan–Guizhou Plateau is one of the vertebrate diversity hotspots of China. At the level of counties, Xingyi is one of nine Chinese vertebrate (excluding birds) diversity hotspots. Animals only known from Guizhou include Leishan moustache toad, Kuankuoshui salamander, Shuicheng salamander, Guizhou salamander, and Zhijin warty newt.

Caohai Lake with its surroundings is a wetland that is an important overwintering site for many birds. It is a National Nature Reserve and an Important Bird Area identified by BirdLife International. Guizhou is one of the four major medicinal material-producing areas in China. The province boasts 4,419 species of medicinal plants and 301 medicinal animals. It is famous for its 50 "authentic medicinal materials" known both domestically and internationally. Over 350 types of Chinese medicinal resources have been developed and utilized, with Gastrodia elata, Eucommia ulmoides, Coptis chinensis, Evodia rutaecarpa, and Dendrobium being the five famous medicinal materials of Guizhou.

=== Mineral resources ===
Guizhou Province is rich in mineral resources and is a major province for mineral resources. More than 110 types of minerals have been discovered, among which 76 types have identified reserves. Several have proven reserves that rank at the forefront nationwide. Those ranking first include mercury, barite, fertilizer sandstone, metallurgical sandstone, decorative diabase, and brick and tile sandstone, etc. Those ranking second include phosphorus, bauxite, rare earths, etc.; those ranking third include magnesium, manganese, gallium, etc. In addition, coal, antimony, gold, pyrite, and other minerals hold significant positions in China. Coal reserves are substantial, with a complete range of coal types and excellent coal quality, with proven reserves at the end of 2002 being 49.227 billion tons; bauxite proven reserves are 424 million tons; phosphate rock reserves are 2.695 billion tons, accounting for over 40% of the national total; barite reserves account for one-third of the country's total; gold reserves rank twelfth in the nation, making it an emerging base for gold production in China.

== Scientific research ==
Major scientific research facilities in Guizhou include:

- The Five-hundred-meter Aperture Spherical Telescope (FAST), the world's largest radio telescope
- The Institute of Geochemistry, Chinese Academy of Sciences

== Politics ==
=== Guizhou Provincial Public Security Department ===
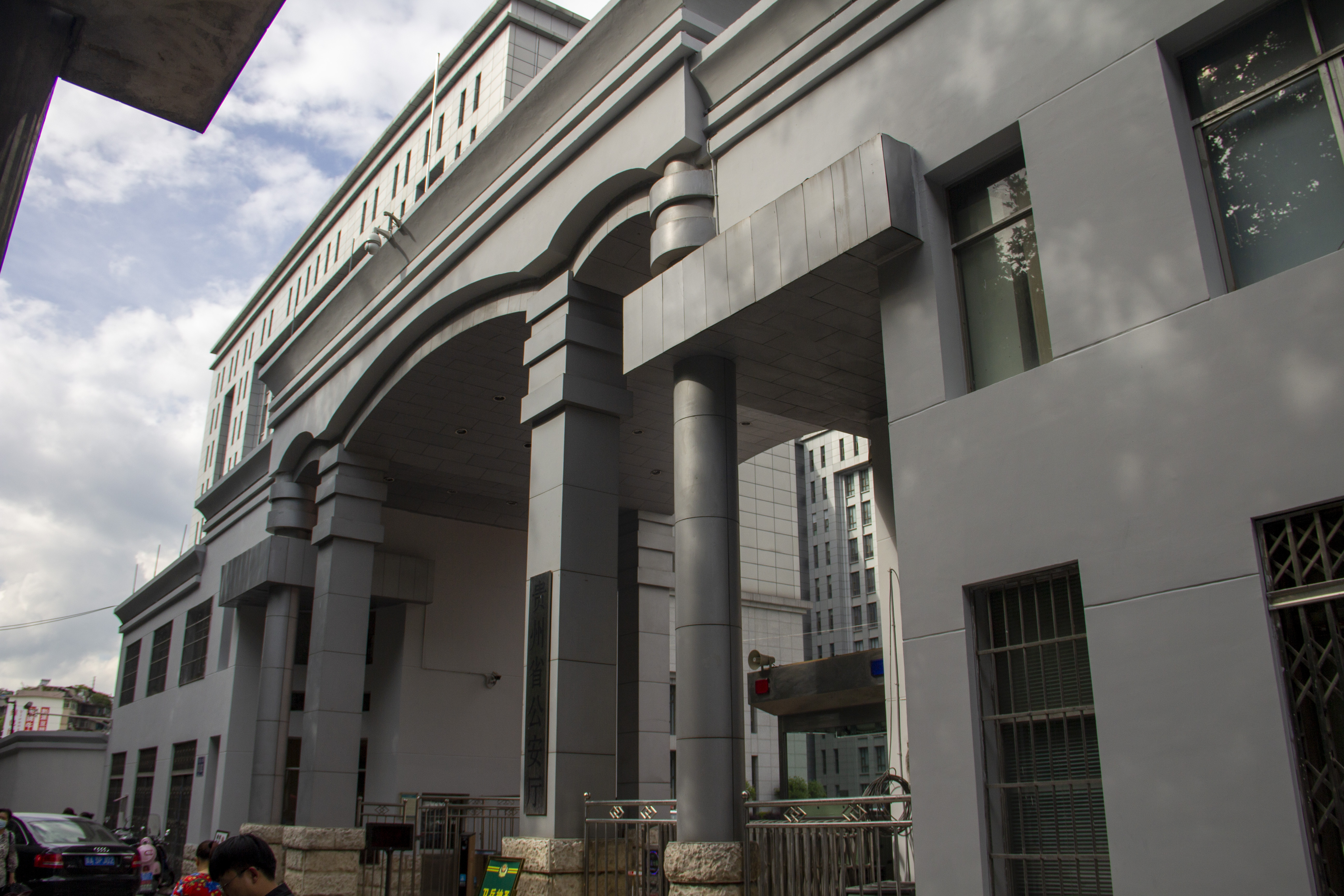
The headquarters of the Guizhou PSD

The Guizhou Provincial Public Security Department (Chinese: 贵州省公安厅) is the primary provincial law enforcement agency in Guizhou. Between 2022 and 2023, official statistics reported that crime had decreased by 7.1%.

==== Equipment ====
===== Vehicles =====
- NJ2045 armored truck – Used by SWAT

===== Helicopters =====
- Harbin Z-9

===== Firearms =====
- QBZ-95 rifle – Used by SWAT
- QSZ-92 pistol – Used by SWAT
- CS/LR4 sniper rifle – Used by SWAT

==== Controversies ====
On February 26, 2025, the former chief of the Guizhou PSD's Traffic Management Bureau was sentenced to 12 years in prison and a 1.1 million RMB fine due to corruption related charges and stealing 369 rounds of ammunition.

==== Line of duty deaths ====
Since its establishment in 1949, there have been 655 line of duty deaths of the Guizhou PSD, of which 199 were awarded martyr status. In 2024, 5 full-time officers and 7 auxiliary police of the Guizhou PSD died in the line of duty.

== Administrative divisions ==
Guizhou is divided into nine prefecture-level divisions: six prefecture-level cities and three autonomous prefectures:

Administrative divisions of Guizhou
Division code	Division	Area in km^{2}	Population 2010	Seat	Divisions			
Division code	Division	Area in km^{2}	Population 2010	Seat	Districts*	Counties	Aut. counties	CL cities
520000	Guizhou Province	176,167.00	34,746,468	Guiyang city	17	51	11	9
520100	Guiyang city	8,046.67	4,324,561	Guanshanhu District	6	3		1
520200	Liupanshui city	9,965.37	2,851,180	Zhongshan District	3			1
520300	Zunyi city	30,780.73	6,127,009	Huichuan District	3	7	2	2
520400	Anshun city	9,253.06	2,297,339	Xixiu District	2	1	3	
520500	Bijie city	26,844.45	6,536,370	Qixingguan District	1	6	1	
520600	Tongren city	18,006.41	3,092,365	Bijiang District	2	4	4	
522300	Qianxinan Aut. Prefecture	16,785.93	2,805,857	Xingyi city		6		2
522600	Qiandongnan Aut. Prefecture	30,278.06	3,480,626	Kaili city		15		1
522700	Qiannan Aut. Prefecture	26,191.78	3,231,161	Duyun city		9	1	2
* – including Special district

Administrative divisions in Chinese and varieties of romanizations
English	Chinese	Pinyin
Guizhou Province	贵州省	Guìzhōu Shěng
Guiyang city	贵阳市	Guìyáng Shì
Liupanshui city	六盘水市	Liùpánshuǐ Shì
Zunyi city	遵义市	Zūnyì Shì
Anshun city	安顺市	Ānshùn Shì
Bijie city	毕节市	Bìjié Shì
Tongren city	铜仁市	Tóngrén Shì
Qianxinan Aut. Prefecture	黔西南自治州	Qiánxīnán Zìzhìzhōu
Qiandongnan Aut. Prefecture	黔东南自治州	Qiándōngnán Zìzhìzhōu
Qiannan Aut. Prefecture	黔南自治州	Qiánnán Zìzhìzhōu

These nine prefecture-level divisions are in turn subdivided into 88 county-level divisions (14 districts, 7 county-level cities, 55 counties, and 11 autonomous counties and one special district).

Population by urban areas of prefecture and county cities
#	Cities	2020 Urban area	2010 Urban area	2020 City proper
1	Guiyang	4,021,275	2,520,061	5,987,018
2	Zunyi	1,675,245	715,148 (Note: New district established after 2010 census: Bozhou (Zunyi County). The new district not included in the urban area count of the pre-expanded city.)	6,606,675
3	Liupanshui	818,753 (Note: New district established after 2020 census: Shuicheng (Shuicheng County). The new district not included in the urban area count of the pre-expanded city.)	491,438	3,031,602
4	Bijie	695,174	421,342 (Note: Bijie Prefecture is currently known as Bijie PLC after 2010 census; Bijie CLC is currently known as Qixingguan after 2010 census.)	6,899,636
5	Anshun	685,654	358,920 (Note: New district established after 2010 census: Pingba (Pingba County). The new district not included in the urban area count of the pre-expanded city.)	2,470,630
6	Xingyi	649,497	335,243	part of Qianxinan Prefecture
7	Kaili	519,243	274,922	part of Qiandongnan Prefecture
8	Tongren	423,078	206,147 (Note: Tongren Prefecture is currently known as Tongren PLC after 2010 census; Tongren CLC & Wanshan SD is currently known as Bijiang & Wanshan after 2010 census.)	3,298,468
9	Panzhou	420,894	(Note: Panxian County is currently known as Panzhou CLC after 2010 census.)	see Liupanshui
10	Renhuai	361,723	171,005	see Zunyi
11	Qingzhen	350,665	166,916	see Guiyang
12	Duyun	348,954	217,091	part of Qiannan Prefecture
13	Xingren	169,210	(Note: Xingren County is currently known as Xingren CLC after 2010 census.)	part of Qianxinan Prefecture
14	Fuquan	153,763	125,389	part of Qiannan Prefecture
15	Chishui	138,699	80,884	see Zunyi

== Economy ==
Xijiang, a Miao settlement in Eastern Guizhou

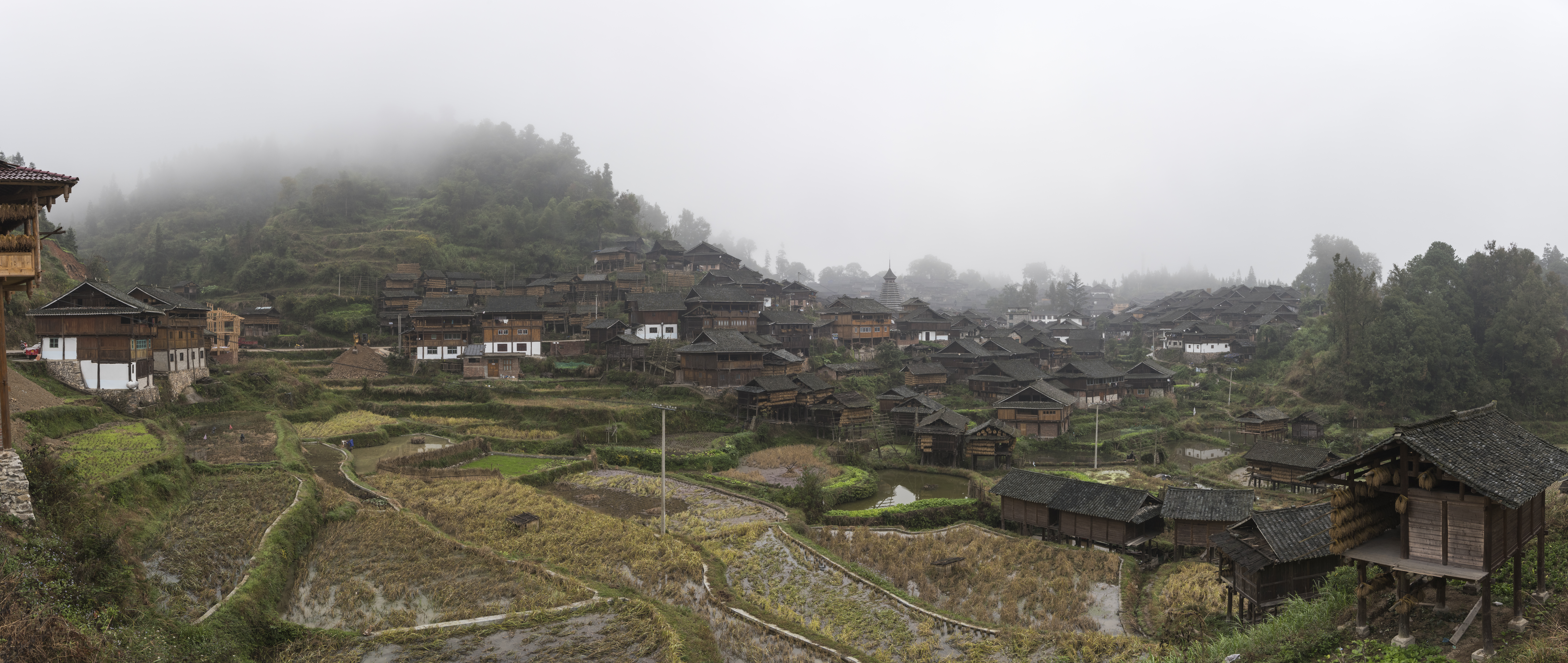
Bapa Dong, a Dong village in Eastern Guizhou

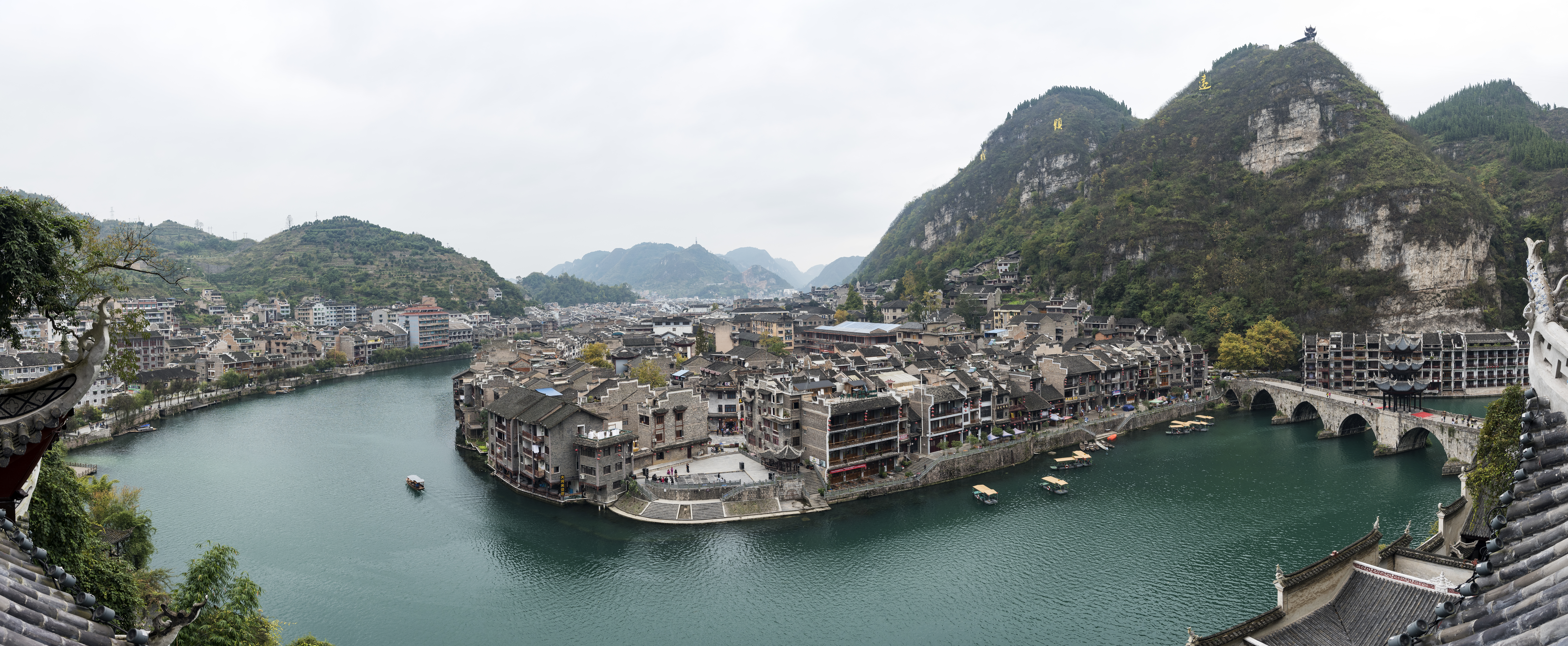
Zhenyuan, a county in Eastern Guizhou

Guizhou's economy has historically relied on a few industries like tobacco, timber, energy, and mining. Its natural industry includes timber and forestry. Guizhou is also the third largest producer of tobacco in China, and home to the well-known brand Guizhou Tobacco. Other important industries in the province include energy (electricity generation) – a large portion of which is exported to Guangdong and other provinces – and mining, especially in coal, limestone, arsenic, gypsum, and oil shale. Guizhou's total output of coal was 118 million tons in 2008, a 7% growth from the previous year. Guizhou's export of power to Guangdong equaled 12% of Guangdong's total power consumption. Over the next 5 years Guizhou hopes to increase this by as much as 50%.

Historically, Guizhou was a poorer province with lagging development. It was a major recipient of China's investment in industrial capacity during the Third Front campaign.

The digital economy has grown significantly since 2015 and as of 2025 continues to develop Guizhou's growing reputation as a center for big data in China. This growth followed provincial Party Secretary Chen Min'er's 2014 strategy of "Big Data, Big Poverty Reduction". The development of big data in Guizhou was conceived as a public utility, heavily state-subsidised, centrally-managed by the government, and oriented toward public service.

Among the major big data projects in Guizhou is Guizhou Cloud, which is sponsored by the Guizhou Big Data Development Administration and Supervised by the Board of Supervisors of Guizhou State-Owned Enterprises and includes technological expertise from Alibaba. Guizhou Cloud develops a digital system for government enterprises. Other major projects include Guiyang Open Government Data Platform (which hosts open access to more than 2,600 government databases spanning 52 municipal agencies and 14 administrative districts) and D-Guiyang (a joint venture between Guiyang city government and a group of technology companies providing free Wi-Fi within the city).

Jiangkou County in Tongren, Guizhou, has been designated as a National High-Tech Enterprise area and a Green Factory site, and is a major centre for industrial-scale tea processing in the province. It is home to over 140,000 mu of EU-standard tea gardens, the world's largest matcha refining facility, and southwest China's largest tea cold-storage warehouse.

Since 2018, the province expanded its matcha production through the transfer of Japanese production expertise and significant investment in production facilities. As of 2026, it is reportedly the largest matcha-producing region in China. In 2025, Japanese public broadcaster NHK reported that a facility in Guizhou province was producing around 2,000 tonnes of matcha annually, described as almost half of Japan's annual output. A 2026 Chosun Biz report stated that Guizhou's annual production had reached approximately 2,500 tonnes, in which around 1,300 tonnes were being exported to 54 countries.

== Transportation ==
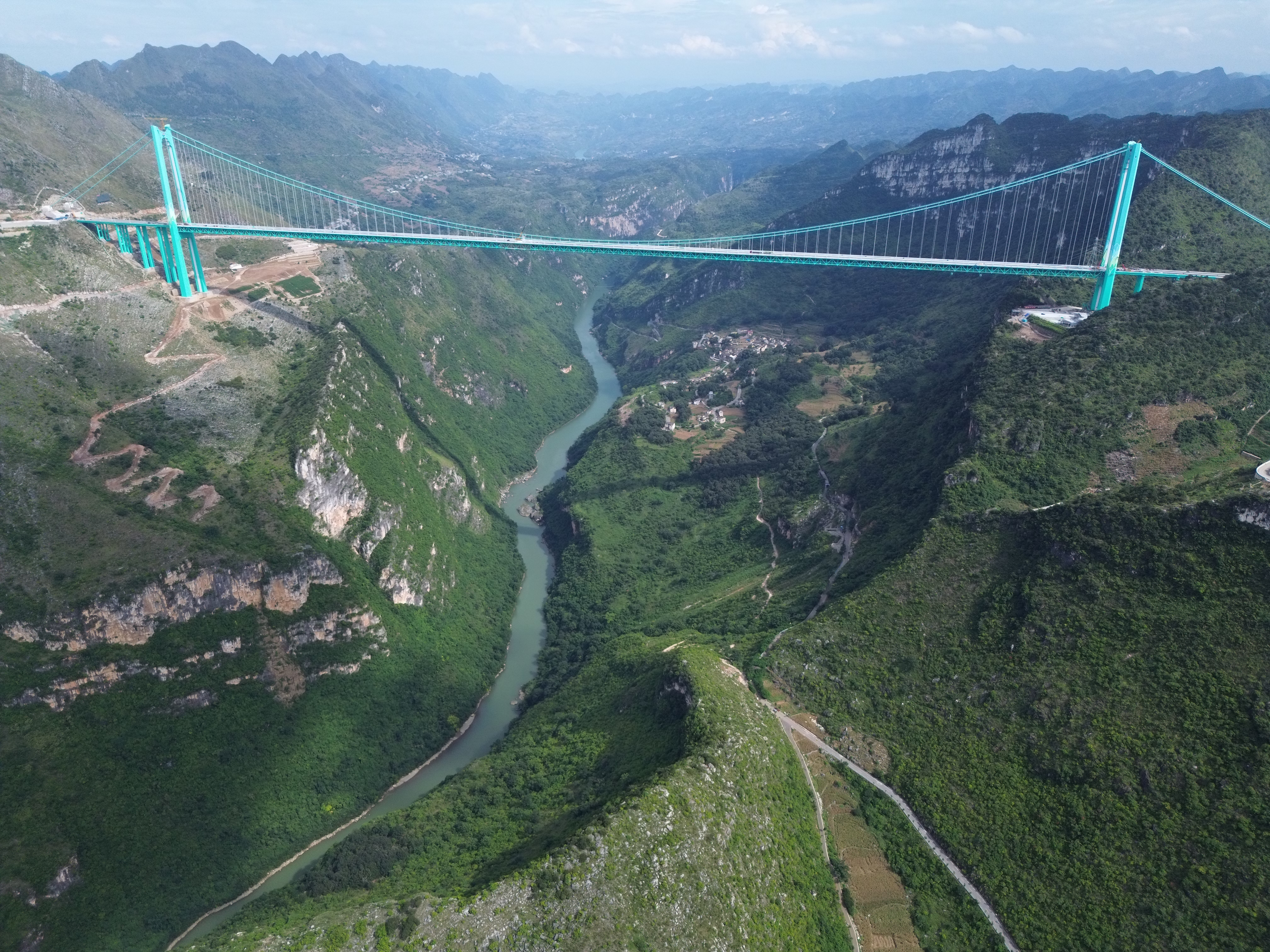
The Huajiang Canyon Bridge the world's highest bridge

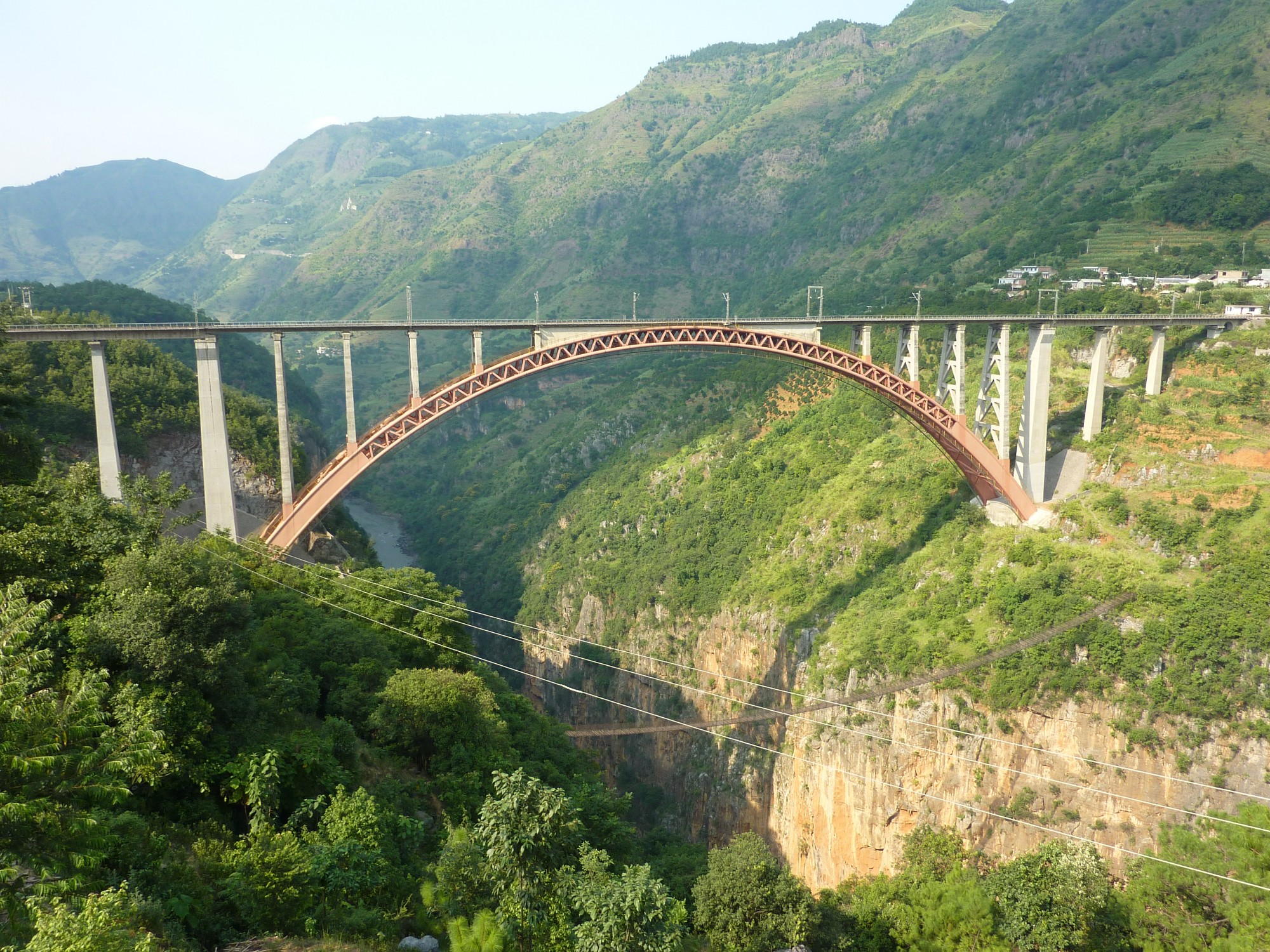
The Beipan River Bridge on the Liupanshui–Baiguo Railway in western Guizhou is one of the highest railway bridges in the world.

In 2017, Sun Zhigang, the governor of Guizhou, announced plans to build 10,000 kilometres (6,210 mi) of highways, 600 kilometres (370 mi) of inland waterways, 4,000 kilometres (2,500 mi) of high-speed rail lines, and 17 airports in three years, in an effort to boost tourism in the province. Guizhou has continued to develop transportation infrastructure (as well as other infrastructure such as electric, water, and broadband infrastructure) to support the growing big data-related sections of the economy.

=== Rail ===
Guizhou's rail network consists primarily of a cross formed by the Sichuan–Guizhou, Guangxi–Guizhou and Shanghai–Kunming railways, which intersect at the provincial capital, Guiyang, near the center of the province. The Liupanshui–Baiguo, Pan County West and Weishe–Hongguo railways form a rail corridor along Guizhou's western border with Yunnan. This corridor connects the Neijiang–Kunming railway, which dips into northwestern Guizhou at Weining, with the Nanning–Kunming railway, which skirts the southwestern corner of Guizhou at Xingyi.

As of 2018, Shanghai–Kunming and Guiyang–Guangzhou high-speed railways are operational. Chengdu–Guiyang high-speed railway is under construction.

== Demographics ==
Historical population
Year	Pop.	±% p.a.
1912	9,665,000	—
1928	14,746,000	+2.68%
1936–37	9,919,000	−4.84%
1947	10,174,000	+0.23%
1954	15,037,310	+5.74%
1964	17,140,521	+1.32%
1982	28,552,997	+2.88%
1990	32,391,066	+1.59%
2000	35,247,695	+0.85%
2010	34,746,468	−0.14%
2020	38,562,148	+1.05%

In 1832, the population was estimated at five million.

Guizhou is demographically one of China's most diverse provinces. Minority groups account for more than 37% of the population and they include Miao (including Gha-Mu and A-Hmao), Yao, Yi, Qiang, Dong, Zhuang, Bouyei, Bai, Tujia, Gelao and Sui. 55.5% of the province area is designated as autonomous regions for ethnic minorities. Guizhou is the province with the highest fertility rate in China, standing at 2.19 (urban: 1.31; rural: 2.42).

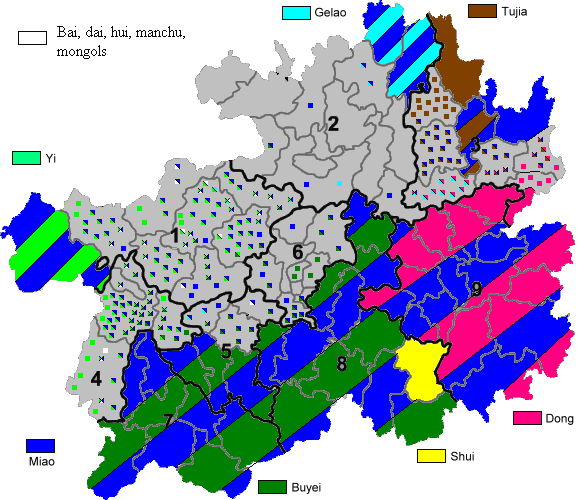
Major autonomous areas within Guizhou, excluding Hui.

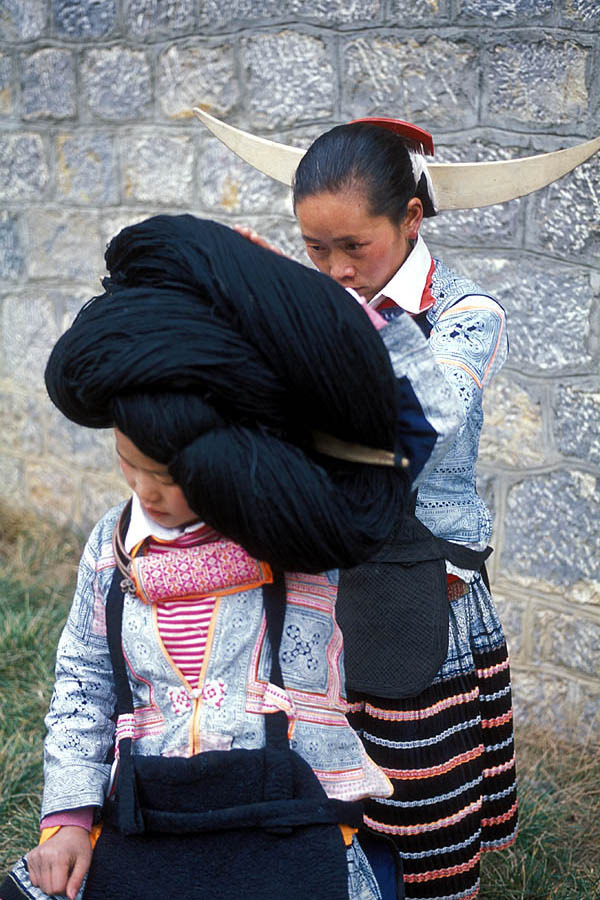
The long-horn tribe, one of the small branches of Miao living in the twelve villages near Zhijin County, Guizhou. The wooden horns remain daily attire for most women.

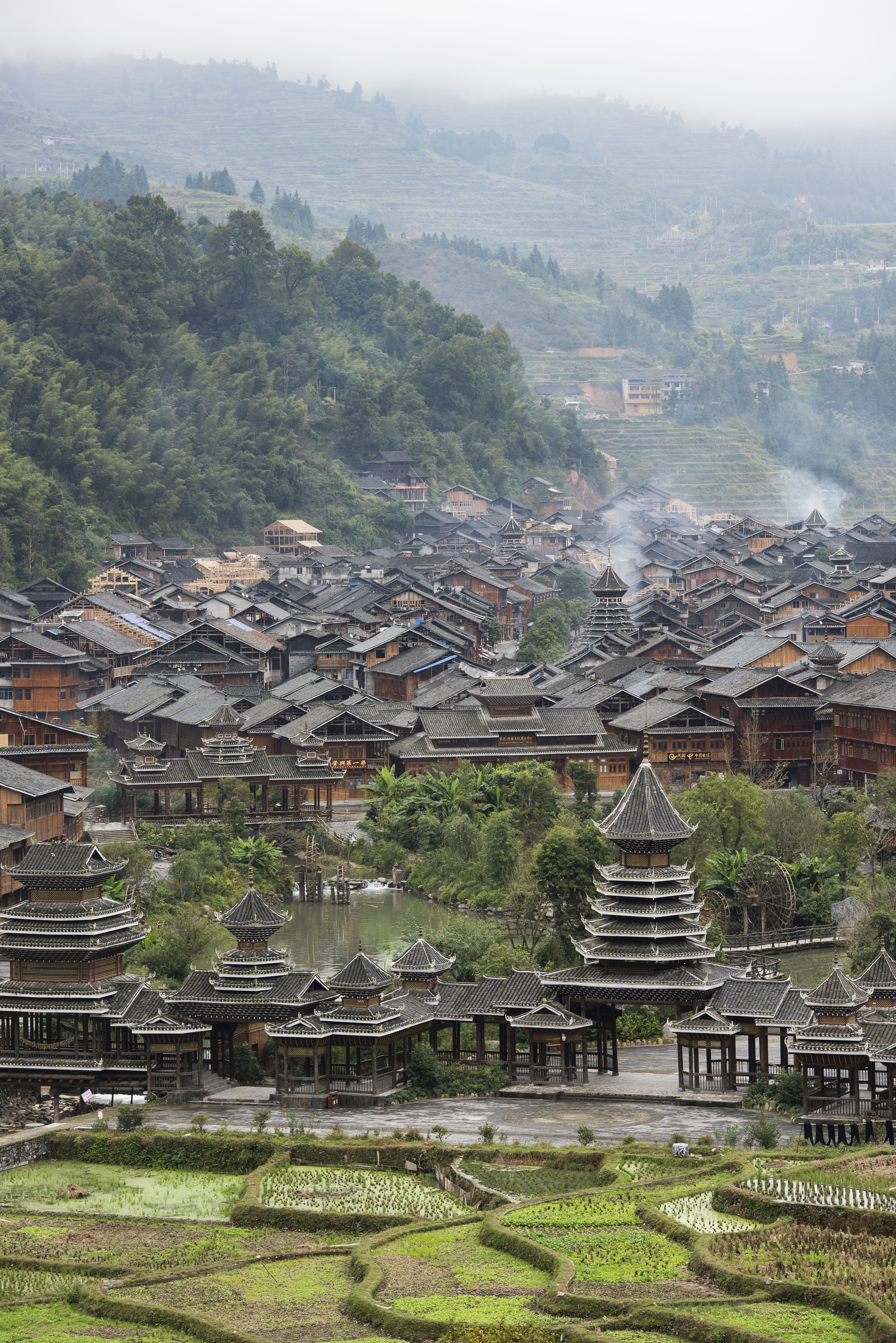
The Dong village of Zhaoxing

Largest cities in Guizhou Source: China Urban Construction Statistical Yearbook 2018 Urban Population and Urban Temporary Population
Rank		Pop.	Rank		Pop.
1	Guiyang	2,922,400	11	Panzhou	216,000
2	Zunyi	1,060,000	12	Qingzhen	202,600
3	Anshun	464,900	13	Chishui	146,700
4	Bijie	447,300	14	Xingren	137,100
5	Tongren	414,200	15	Fuquan	134,000
6	Kaili	409,100
7	Liupanshui	359,700
8	Xingyi	334,100
9	Duyun	328,400
10	Renhuai	250,300

=== Religion ===
Religion in Guizhou (Note: The data was collected by the Chinese General Social Survey (CGSS) of 2009 and by the Chinese Spiritual Life Survey (CSLS) of 2007, reported and assembled by Xiuhua Wang (2015) in order to confront the proportion of people identifying with two similar social structures: ① Christian churches, and ② the traditional Chinese religion of the lineage (i.e. people believing and worshipping ancestral deities often organised into lineage "churches" and ancestral shrines). Data for other religions with a significant presence in China (Buddhism, Confucianism, deity worships, Taoism, folk religious sects, Islam, religions practiced by ethnic minorities, et al.) was not reported by Wang.)
1. Chinese ancestral religion (31.2%)
2. Christianity (0.99%)
3. Other religions or non-religious persons (Note: This may include: Buddhists; Confucians; Deity worshippers; Taoists; Members of folk religious sects; Small minorities of Muslims; Indigenous religions of the ethnic minorities; And people not bounded to, nor practicing any, institutional or diffuse religion.) (67.8%)

The predominant religions in Guizhou are Chinese folk religions, Taoist traditions and Chinese Buddhism. According to surveys conducted in 2007 and 2009, 31.18% of the population believes and is involved in ancestor veneration, while 0.99% of the population identifies as Christian, decreasing from 1.13% in 2004.

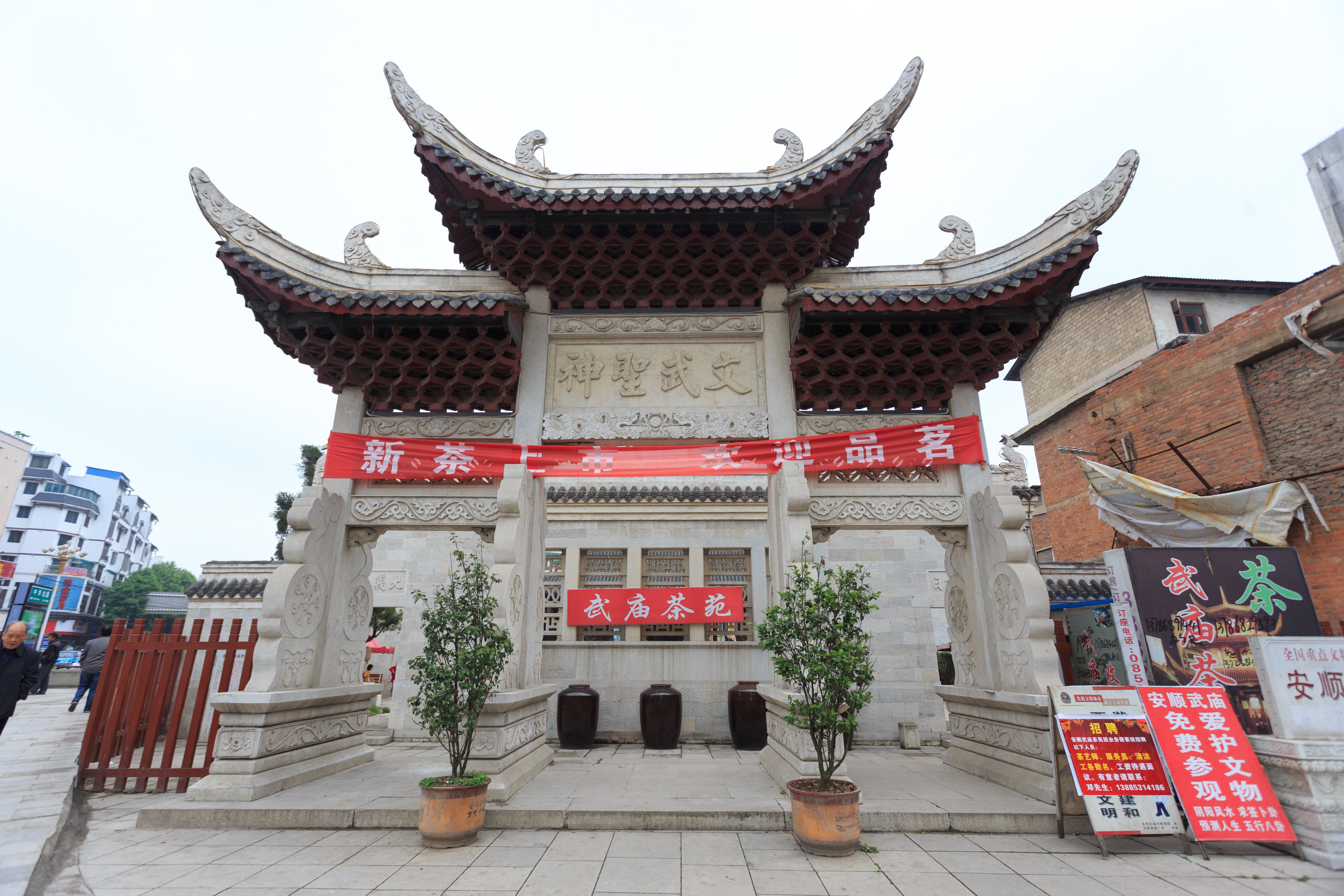
Wumiao (Temple of the God of War) dedicated to Guandi in Anshun.

The reports did not give figures for other types of religion; 67.83% of the population may be either irreligious or involved in worship of nature deities, Buddhism, Confucianism, Taoism, folk religious sects, and small minorities of Muslims. There are significant ethnic minority populations (the Miao and the Buyei) who traditionally follow their autochthonous religions.

== Cuisine ==
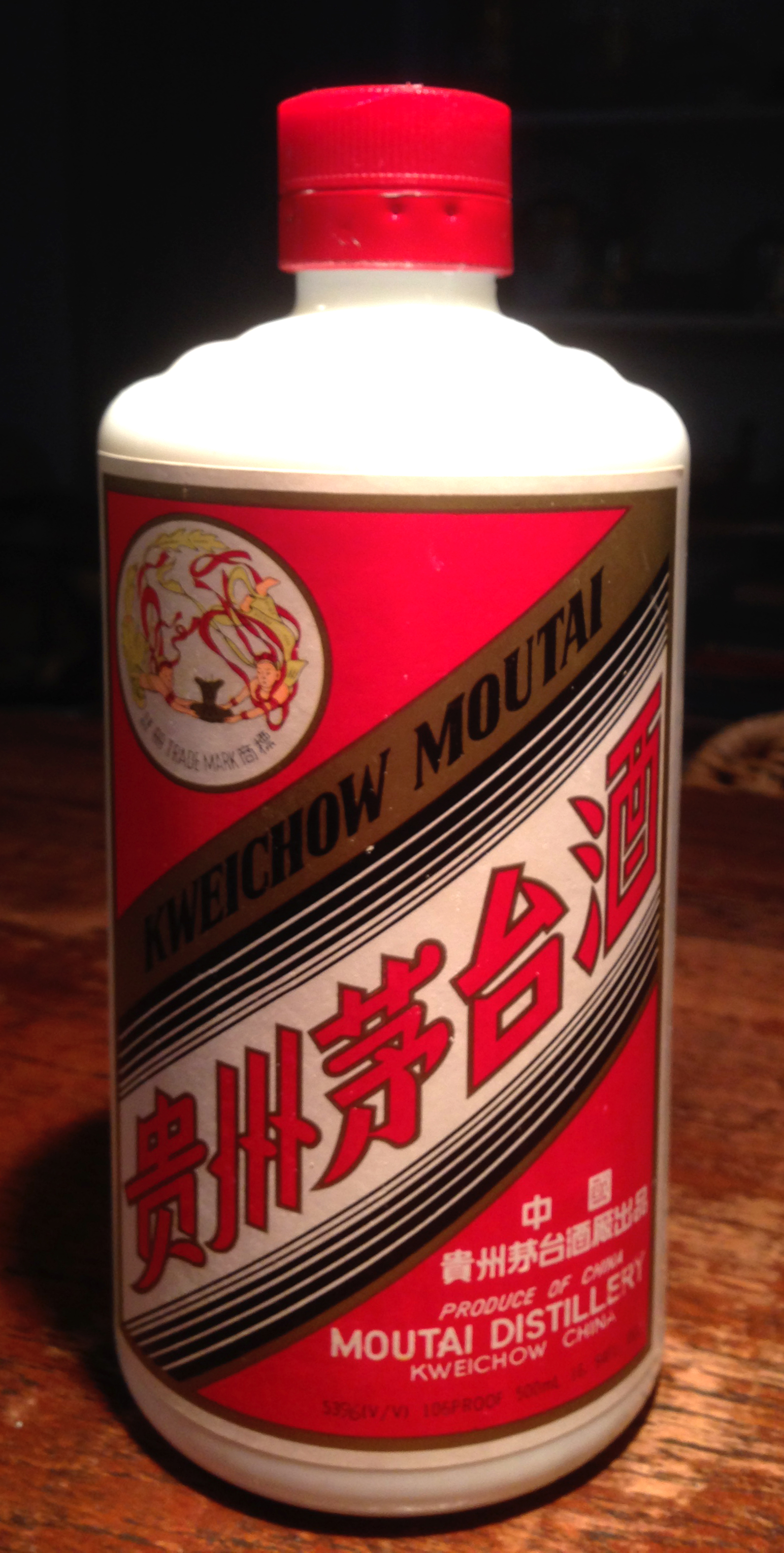
Moutai

Guizhou is the home of the well-known Chinese liquor Moutai, as well as Lao Gan Ma.

== Tourism ==
The province has many covered bridges, called Wind and Rain Bridges. These were built by the Dong people.

The southeastern corner of the province is known for its unique Dong minority culture. Towns such as Rongjiang, Liping, Diping and Zhaoxing are scattered amongst the hills along the border with Guangxi.

=== Three recommended forms ===
The World Bank's "Strategic Environmental Assessment Study: Tourism Development in the Province of Guizhou, China" (May 25, 2007) points to three different forms of tourism that should be fostered and developed in Guizhou: Nature-based, heritage-based and rural. Heritage-based tourism provides ethnic minority groups with an opportunity to preserve their unique heritage while still making a living.

== Colleges and universities ==
- Guizhou University (Guiyang)
- Guizhou Normal University (Guiyang)
- Guiyang Medical University (Guiyang)
- Guizhou Nationalities University (Guiyang)
- Guizhou Institute of Technology (Guiyang)
- Zunyi Medical College (Zunyi)
- Moutai University (Zunyi)
- Tongren University (Tongren)
- Kaili University (Kaili)

== Media ==
- Guizhou Daily

== Notable people ==
- Shi Jinmo (1881–1969), founder of medical colleges
- Sun Yafang (1955–), engineer, business executive and former Chairwoman of Huawei from 1999 to 2018
- Chuan He (1972–), biologist
- Huang Xiaoyun (1998–), singer and actress
- Zhou Shen (1992–), singer
- Bi Gan (1989–), director

== See also ==
- Major national historical and cultural sites in Guizhou
