= Guizhou delegation to the National People's Congress =

Guizhou Delegation to the National People's Congress
- 全国人民代表大会贵州省代表团
- Delegation for the National People's Congress
- Map showing the location of Guizhou Province
- Electoral unit: Guizhou Province
- Population: 38,562,148

Current Delegation
- Created: 1954
- Seats: 71
- Head of delegation: Xu Lin
- Provincial People's Congress: Guizhou Provincial People's Congress

The Guizhou delegation to the National People's Congress is a delegation composed of deputies representing Guizhou Province within the National People's Congress (NPC), the highest organ of state power of the People's Republic of China. NPC deputies from the Guizhou Province are officially elected by the Guizhou Provincial People's Congress.

== List of deputies ==
Year	NPC sessions	Deputies	Number of deputies	Ref.
1954	1st	Wang Tianxi, Wang De'an, Tian Junliang, Shen Yunpu, Ai Siqi, Wu Zhizhen, Wu Tongming, Li Fangyao, Zhou Suyuan, Hong Shen, Mao Xianqi, Xu Jiansheng, Gao Kelin, Chen Yongchang, Chen Yongkang, Chen Zenggu, Chen Zhimin, Lu Qingmei, Lu Zhenfan, Yang Hanxian, Meng Sufeng, Zhao Shuhua, Liu Chun, Ou Baichuan, Luo Dengyi, Yan Xichun: By-election on June 15, 1956: Zhou Lin, Peng Huanwu		
1959	2nd	Wei Maowen, Wang Youren, Wang Xingcai, Wang De'an, Wang Yaolun, Tian Junliang, Liu Ziyi, Liu Jianxi, Ai Siqi, Yan Xichun, Li Fangyao, Li Xiage, Lu Qingmei, Chen Zhimin, Wu Tongming, Luo Dengyi, Zhou Lin, Hu Yuxian (female), Gao Kelin, Qin Bixiang, Xu Jiansheng, Peng Huanwu, Yang Hanxian, Yang Binkui, Meng Sufeng (female), Xiong Kaiming		
1964	3rd	Wang Tiangui, Wang Youren, Wang Xingcai, Wang Kai, Wang De'an, Wang Yaolun, Wei Maowen, Mao Tieqiao, Kong Yuan, Long Xianzhao, Tian Xingcai, Tian Junliang, An Qichong, Cheng Ke, Bi Changlan, Zhu Kan, Wang Shouzhong, Wang Fuqing, Song Yinke, Song Hehai, Yan Xichun, Li Fangyao, Li Guoqing, Li Xiagong, Li Guizhen, Li Shunchen, Yang Hanxian, Yang Binkui, Wu Shi, Wu Tongming, Wu Peixin, Zhang Guangming, Lu Qingmei, Na Xingzhai, Zheng Yixing, Zheng Zhouqing, Lin Lanying, Luo Xingfang, Luo Dengyi, Zhou Minxuan, Zhou Lin, Huan Xiang, Zhao Rongxia, Hu Lijiao, Hu Yuxian, He Cuizhi, Qin Bixiang, Yuan Jiaji, Gu Guangzhong, Gu Xiaoguang, Yan Zhenxi, Xu Bing, Xu Yunbei, Xu Caidong, Xu Jiansheng, Zeng Xianhui, Peng Huanwu, Meng Mingru, Meng Sufeng, Lai Qifang, Tan Xue, He Jianhua, Pei Tong, Xiong Kaiming, Pan Yinghua, Mu Xin, Jian Xianai		
1975	4th	Wang Buxiaorong, Wang Yongnian, Wang Zhiguo, Wang Bingqing, Ye Yuzhen, Tian Ziming, Tian Yingchun, Zhu Chunfang, Ren Suhua, Liu Fengying, Liu Huifang, Xu Tianzhen, Sun Changde, Li Liancheng, Li Xiagong, Li Zeyin, Li Tinggui, Li Zhenbang, Li Shengfang, Yang Laogao, Yang Xianzheng, Yang Chunhua, Wu Wenjuan, Wu Yuying, Wu Xiulong, Wu Guochao, Wu Chengqing, Wu Jiayong, Wu Tongming, Song Hebin, Zhang Tinghuai, Zhang Changqi, Zhang Ming, Lu Sanjiu, Lu Qiongying, Chen Changmao, Chen Guoxiu, Chen Ruian, Chen Puru, Zhou Jianping, Zhao Ruixing, Luo Shaocheng, Nie Jingxi, Jia Tingsan, Guo Yingkang, Tao Duansheng, Zhang Taoxian, Liang Shide, Han Qiying, Lu Ruilin, Zeng Xianhui, Xiong Chaojian, Pan Jiashu		
1978	5th	Ma Li, Ma Qiming, Wang Zhilong, Wang Tingrong, Wang Bingqing, Ran Xi'e, Bai Meifu, Liu Fengying, Liu Yingqing, An Shijue, Xu Tianzhen, Du Huizhen, Li Dagang, Li Yufang, Li Xingxue, Li Zhiqi, Li Liancheng, Li Jie, Li Tinggui, Li Shengfang, Yang Jianhua, Yang Jingzhou, Yang Derong, Xiao Chengping, Wu Renhui, Wu Xiulong, Wu Yingxing, Wu Guochao, Wu Shi, Wu Chengqing, Wu Tongming, Yu Hongquan, Chi Huanxin, Zhang Jun Zhi, Zhang Xiuqin, Zhang Mingqing, Zhang Xuefen, Zhang Xiaohong, Lu Sanjiu, Lu Qiongying, Luo Shaoheng, Luo Dengyi, Zhou Jianping, Zhou Hengchun, Zhou Shulan, Zheng Zhouyin, Zhao Guoxing, Zhao Rongxia, Yu Weijiang, Luo Guoqiang, Jia Tingsan, Gu Demei, Tu Guangchi, Huang Shaochen, Huang Enfen, Cao Yuzhen, Gong Yufeng, Zhang Shirui, Liang Shunmo, Han Qiying, Fu Shirong, Zeng Xianhui, Liao Qiong, Tan Xue, Tan Jingyi, Xiong Chaojian, Pan Yefen		
1983	6th	Ding Yunzhou, Wang Youren, Wang Yongxiang, Wang Xiuyang, Wang Bingjun, Wang Zulun, Wang Chaowen, Wang Demao, Wen Mingxian, Shi Weiying, Long Lianshou, Long Buquan, Ye Xin, Bao Wenlong, Xing Jifeng, Wu Chaofei, Liu Jiuzhu, Liu Fengming, Liu Wenzhi, Liu Dongsheng, Jiang Yunxian, An Xinghua, An Yifu, Xu Mengyi, Sun Shulin, Su Gang, Li Xuegao, Li Tinggui, Li Tongda, Li Nengyong, Li Shengfang, Yang Chugui, Yang Changwen, Yang Jingzhou, Wu Bangjian, Wu Xiangbi Wu Guonian, Wu Shi, Shen E, Song Guixian, Zhang Jizhai, Zhang Junzhi, Zhang Sigen, Zhang Guizhen, Zhang Xiaohong, Luo Shangcai, Luo Mingzhu, Luo Dengyi, Jin Wukuan, Zhou Lili, Zhao Rongxia, Yu Weijiang, Jiang Mingke, Huan Xiang, Fei Changqing, Xia Yewen, Qian Min, Xu Yunbei, Xu Zhangxiong, Gao Huanying, Guo Zhenrong, Tang Siyue, Tu Guangchi, Mei Geng'an, Jie Genlan, Peng Xinglu, Fu Beiping, Lu Yiquan, Lu Zhiming, Xie Peiyong, Tan Xue, Pan Zhifu, Pan Lianfen		
1988	7th	Yu Ximing, Ma Yubao, Wang Tianzhen, Wang Feng, Wang Youren, Wang Shouting, Wang Bingyun, Wang Lusheng, Wang Rongbang, Wang Bingjun, Wang Jiajun, Wang Shuxian, Wang Chaowen, Wang Demao, Wang Yaolun, Wei Shaokai, Wen Quanyou, Wen Mingxian, Long Guoyi, Lu Jieke, Shen Yunpu, Ye Xin, Ran Yannong, Zhu Qing, Liu Jiuzhu, Liu Daliang, Liu Yuanju, Liu Yanyu, Liu Aili, An Diwei, An Yifu, Xu Chenggong, Sun Shulin, Li Guanghui, Li Huamei, Li Changqi, Li Xuegao, Li Xiaojing, Yang Wengang, Yang Chugui, Yang Jingzhou, Wu Shaoxiang, Wu Bangjian, Wu Xiangbi, Wu Shi, He Zhaolin, Zou Kailiang, Zhang Yuhuan, A Lue, Chen Wenbiao, Chen Guangzhi, Chen Huili, Luo Pingyi, Luo Zhiying, Luo Dengyi, Meng Liankun, Hu Jin'en, Hu Jintao, Huan Xiang, Fei Changqing, Qin Chuan, Mo Liangde, Xu Yunbei, Xu Yinglian, Xu Caidong, Xu Jiansheng, Cheng Mengren, Fu Kun, Zeng Mingying, Lu Zhiming, Xie Peiyong, Gun Chenghua, Pan Chengjie, Dai Zhenhua		
1993	8th	Ma Wenjun, Wang Yiqin, Wang Guowen, Wang Guochang, Wang Lusheng, Wang Bingjun, Wang Zhenjiang, Wang Shuxian, Wang Chaowen, Wang Qinhua, Wei Shaoyu, Wei Shaokai, Wen Mingxian, Fang Chongping, Long Mingwu, Lu Wanli, Shen Cheng, Tian Jiyun, Bai Dexiang, Zhu Qing, Qiao Xueheng, Liu Daliang, Liu Yeqiang, Liu Yuanju, Liu Changgui, Liu Zhengwei, Liu Bingkun, Liu Aili, Liu Luchai, An Yifu, Xu Leren, Li Daxue, Li Tianbi, Li Xianhui, Li Aiping, Yang Guang, Yang Yun Fu, Yang Chugui, Yang Zelin, Yang Xiaolian, Yang Juhua, Wu Shaoxiang, Wu Xiangbi, He Zhaolin, He Shengfan, Zou Kailiang, Zhang Yuhuan, Zhang Zhitin, Zhang Qingqin, Zhang Mingda, Lu Zhenfan, Chen Qingjie, Ou Mingzhen, Luo Shangcai, Zhou Yansong, Zhou Defen, Meng Liankun, Zhao Ziyi, Yao Maosen, Mo Shiren, Xu Caidong, Guo Zhuming, Tao Junlin, Huang Yiren, Huang Kangsheng, Kang Hongyuan, Lu Zhiming, Lou Shili, Zhan Xianfen, Guan Yanhe, Xiong Mingzhen, Dai Zhenhua		
1998	9th	Wang Xianggui, Wang Shouting, Wang Yingxue, Wang Guochang, Wang Siming (Buyi), Wang Chaowen (Miao), Wei Yuecai (Shui), Long Mingwu (Miao), Long Yaohong (Dong).~~Luwanli~~Wu Zhenglan (Buyi), Xiang Dehong, Liu Fangren, Liu Yulin, Liu Xiaokai (Miao), Jiang Guoxing (Dong), Sun Guoqiang, Su Xiaoqing, Li Daxue, Li Ping, Li Jinsheng, Li Biyun (Miao), Yang Changhuai (Dong), Yang Shuju (Dong), Yang Qiong (Miao), Yang Yongzhe, Yang Huizhu, Wu Xuexiang, Wu Zhuhui, He Chengyu (Mongolian), Zou Kailiang, Zhang Yuhuan, Zhang Zhitin, Zhang Chun (Miao), Chen Tianwen (Buyi), Chen Xun, Chen Yuanwu, Wu Honglin, Yi Sheng Jin, Luo Fangheng (Buyi), Luo Shangcai (Buyi), Zhou Wancheng, Zhou Jin, Zhou Defen, Zhao Jiaxing, Hu Jintao, Xiang Xiaoqing, Shi Xingtao, Yao Qiong (Gelao), Ban Anfen (Miao), Yuan Zhou, Mo Shiren (Buyi), Gu Qingjin, Qian Yunlu, Xu Duanfu, Yin Wenxia, Huang Lidong (Tujia), Huang Kangsheng (Buyi), Cao Zhi, Liang Mingde, Fu Chuanyue, Lu Tianxu (Yi), Lu Wenbin (Yi), Meng Qiliang (Miao), Dai Zhenhua (Tujia)		
2003	10th	Wan Longjun (female), Wang Xiaolong, Wang Dongjiang, Wang Anxin, Wang Lirong (female, Buyi), Wang Guochang, Wang Lian (female, Miao), Wang Shusen, Shi Wenqiong (female, Dong), Shi Bangding (Miao), Shi Xiushi, Long Zhengqing (Yi), Long Zhiyi (Yi), Long Yaohong (Dong), Lu Shouxiang, Bai Ping (female, Buyi), Xiang Dehong, Liu Xiaokai (Miao), Sun Guoqiang, Sun Chengyi, Li Daxue, Li Wanlu, Li Jian (Tujia), Li Longchang, Yang Changhuai (Dong), Yang Yuxue, Yang Chengshi (female, Dong), Yang Changyun (female, Shui), Yang Haiyan (female, Miao), Yang Xixiu (female, Buyi) (Ethnic minorities), Yang Jinhua, Wu Shougen (Miao), Leng Yingfen (female, Miao), Song Xinmin, Zhang Shide, Zhang Linchun, Zhang Jianhua, Zhang Jian, Zhang Qunshan, Chen Shineng, Chen Dawei, Chen Shiping (female, Gelao), Wu Honglin, Zhao Jiaxing, Hu Xiansheng (Miao), Hou Yibin, Jiang Yanhu, Ban Chengnong (Buyi), Yuan Renguo, Yuan Chengdong (Buyi), Gu Jiu, Gu Qingjin, Qian Yunlu, Xu Duanfu, Gao Deming, Tang Jiaxuan, Huang Kangsheng (Buyi), Gong Xianyong, Gong Zhenqian (Tujia), Liang Wenzhen (female, Buyi), Peng Boyuan, Cheng Faguang, Meng Qiliang (Miao), Dou Deyin, Mu Degui, Liao Shaohua		
2008	11th	Yu Yang, Wang Shijie, Wang Siqi, Wang Shengjun, Deng Zhihong (Miao), Shi Zongyuan (Hui), Long Gang (Miao), Shen Xiaoqing, Ling Jihua, Bao Kexin, Lü Jianjun (female), Liu Yimin, Liu Qiaoying (female, Buyi), Liu Yuankun (Miao), Sun Chengyi, Sun Yuan (female), Li Feiyue (Dong), Li Yuecheng (Miao), Li Min, Yang Fengling (female, Buyi), Yang Xiuxi (Dong), Yang Guixin (female, Dong), Yang Hongbo, Yang Xue (female, Miao), Shu Xiaomei (female), Xiao Yong'an, Wu Xiaoling (female), Yu Weixiang, Song Xinmin, Zhang Shengzhi, Zhang Jiachun (Shui), Chen Weidong, Chen Zhong, Chen Mingming (Buyi) Chen Shi (Gelao), Chen Junping, Chen Ping (female, Yi), Gou Tianlin, Lin Shusen, Ouyang Qiansen, Luo Tao (female, Buyi), Ji Keliang, Qu Qinglin, Zhu Deguang (Miao), Yao Jianxiang (Buyi), Yao Xiaoying (female), Yao Yizhou (Dong), Qin Rupei, Yuan Zhou, Gao Wanneng (Tujia), Guo Ziyi, Tang Shili (female, Buyi), Tao Huabi (female), Sang Guowei, Huang Bangquan (Buyi), Cao Hongxing, Gong Xianyong, Cui Yadong, Peng Boyuan, Lu Zhiming (Yi), Meng Qiliang (Miao), Lei Ayouduo (female, Miao), Mu Degui, Liao Guoxun (Tujia), Huo Ying (female), Wei Yongzhu		
2013	12th	~~Wang Shujun~~, Wang Wei, Wang Bingqing, Wang Bingshen, Wang Jichao (Yi), Wang Jing (female, Buyi), Mao Youbi (female), ~~Shi Zongyuan (Hui)~~, Long Changchun (Miao), Long Chaoyun (female, Dong), Lu Yunhui, Bao Kexin, Xiang Hongqiong (female, Miao), Liu Qiaoying (female, Buyi), Liu Yuankun (Miao), Sun Huapu, Hua Quan (Buyi), Li Quanzhong, Li Zaiyong (Gelao), Li Min, Yang Guixin (female, Dong), Yang Hongbo, Yang Aidong (female, Dong), Shu Xiaomei (female), Wu Minglan (female, Buyi), Wu Xiaoling (female), He Gang, Zhang Jiachun (Shui), Zhang Guoying (female, Tujia), Zhang Bainan, Zhang Jian, Zhang Qunshan, Chen Weidong, Chen Zhong, Chen Changxu, Chen Min'er, Tai Shunjun (Miao), Ouyang Qiansen Luo Yuping, Luo Ning (female), Luo Liangquan (Miao), Zhou Jiankun, Zheng Weiyong (Gelao), Zheng Qiang, Qu Qinglin, Zhao Kezhi, Hu Rongzhong, Hu Ruizhong, Yao Xiaoying (female), Yuan Renguo,(Tujia), Yuan Zhou, Li Zhanshu, Xia Qingfeng, Tang Shili (female, Buyi), Tang Siqing, Tao Huabi (female), Huang Huiling (female, Buyi), Yan Jianguo, Liang Wentong (Dong), Peng Sen, Shu Mingyong (Buyi), Lu Zhiming (Yi), Xie Quan, Xie Qiang, Meng Qiliang (Miao), Chu Haitao, Lei Yan (female, Miao), Bao Jiake, Cai Qun (female, Miao), Liao Fei (Miao), Wei Yongzhu		
2018	13th	Ding Xuexiang, Wang Wei, Wei Bo (Buyi), Wei Zuying (female, Miao), Wen Zhengyou (Yi), Zuo Wenxue, Shi Liping (female, Miao), Shi Rong (female, Miao), Shi Huifen (female, Gelao), Lü Jinglei, Ren Xianliang, Hua Qian (female, Dong), Xiang Qiao (female, Miao), Liu Duo (female), Liu Yuankun (Miao), Sun Yongchun, Sun Zhigang, Li Feiyue (Dong), Li Zaiyong (Gelao), Li Gang, Li Jian (Tujia), Yang Yongying (female, Buyi), Yang Lin (Tujia), Yang Changqin (female, Miao), Wu Minglan (female, Buyi), Wu Shenghua (Buyi), He Guangliang (Miao), He Lin (female), Yu Bili (Female, Buyi), Yu Weixiang, Song Shuixian (female, Shui), Song Baoan, Zhang Jizhi, Zhang Deqin, Chen Shaobo (Tujia), Chen Shaorong (Chuanqing), Chen Hua (Yi), Chen Yan, Ouyang Wu, Ouyang Qiansen, Luo Yinghe (Miao), Luo Qiang (Miao), Luo Peng, Luo Yi (Buyi), Zhou Shaojun (Gelao), Zheng Chuanjiu, Meng Pinghong (female, Buyi), Cha Yan (female), Gong Puguang, Yuan Changxuan (Dong), Yuan Zhou, Xia Hongmin, Yan Wanping (female), Xu Yuan, Yin Hongmei (female), ~~Gao Weidong~~, Huang Dongbing, Huang Dingcheng (Miao), Tuo Biguang, Chen Yiqin (female, Bai), Han Deyang, Fu Xinping, Zeng Li (female, Miao)~~Lei Yan (female, Miao ethnicity)~~He Jie, Liao Chengchen (Dong ethnic group), Huo Tao, Wei Shuwang .		
2023	14th	Wan Quan, Wang Yongjin, Wang Huning, Yin Hengbin, Shi Huaqing, Lu Dan, Ye Zanping, Tian Jinhua, Ran Bo, Fu Qingmei, Zhu Shan, Tang Yueqiang, Du Wei, Li Yuanping, Li Shiyao, Li Li, Li Ying, Li Bingjun, Li Dexiang, Li Wei, Yang Yongying, Yang Zaitao, Yang Changqin, Yang Kai, Yang Enlan, Yang Shuo, Xiao Zhengqiang, Xiao Lishu, Xiao Jun, Wu Donglai, Wu Qiang, Qiu Ninghong, Shen Chunyao, Song Baoan Zhang Shuyang, Zhang Dingchao, Zhang Shunyong, Zhang Shenglin, Zhang Jizhi, Mao Ronghua, Ouyang Qiansen, Zhou Jingyu, Zheng Wei, Zheng Peikun, Zhao Ziyi, Hu Yongzhong, Cha Yan, Hou Jianguo, Jiang Peng, Hong Hupeng, Yuan Shu, Mo Fuyuan, Li Nina, Xia Hua, Xu Lin, Tao Changhai, Sang Weiliang, Huang Wei, Huang Xingwen, Huang Yong, Peng Danbing, Zhan Chengfu, Liao Sha, Tan Lin, Pan Dafu, Mu Rongkun, Ju Huaguo		
