= List of administrative divisions of Chongqing =

Municipality of Chongqing
- Municipality
- Seat: Yuzhong District

County level divisions
- Counties: 8
- Autonomous counties: 4
- Districts: 25

Township level divisions
- Towns / areas^{*}: 557
- Townships / areas^{*}: 272
- Ethnic townships: 14
- Subdistricts: 160

Villages level divisions
- Communities: 3,085
- Administrative villages: 8,043

Chongqing is the largest of the four direct-controlled municipalities of the People's Republic of China and is further divided into 25 districts, 8 counties, and 4 autonomous counties.

It had 17 counties until October 2011, when Qijiang County and Wansheng District were merged to form the new Qijiang District, and Dazu County and Shuangqiao District were merged to form the new Dazu District.

From October 2011 to June 2014, Chongqing had 15 counties until Bishan and Tongliang Counties were upgraded into district status. Two further counties were upgraded into district Tongnan and Rongchang Counties were upgraded into districts. In 2016 there additional counties were upgraded into district Kaizhou, Wulong and Liangping.

On 6 November, 2025, Chongqing abolished Jiangbei District and Yubei District, and the state-level new area Liangjiang New Area became a formal administrative division, consisting of Jiangbei, part of Yubei and part of Beibei.

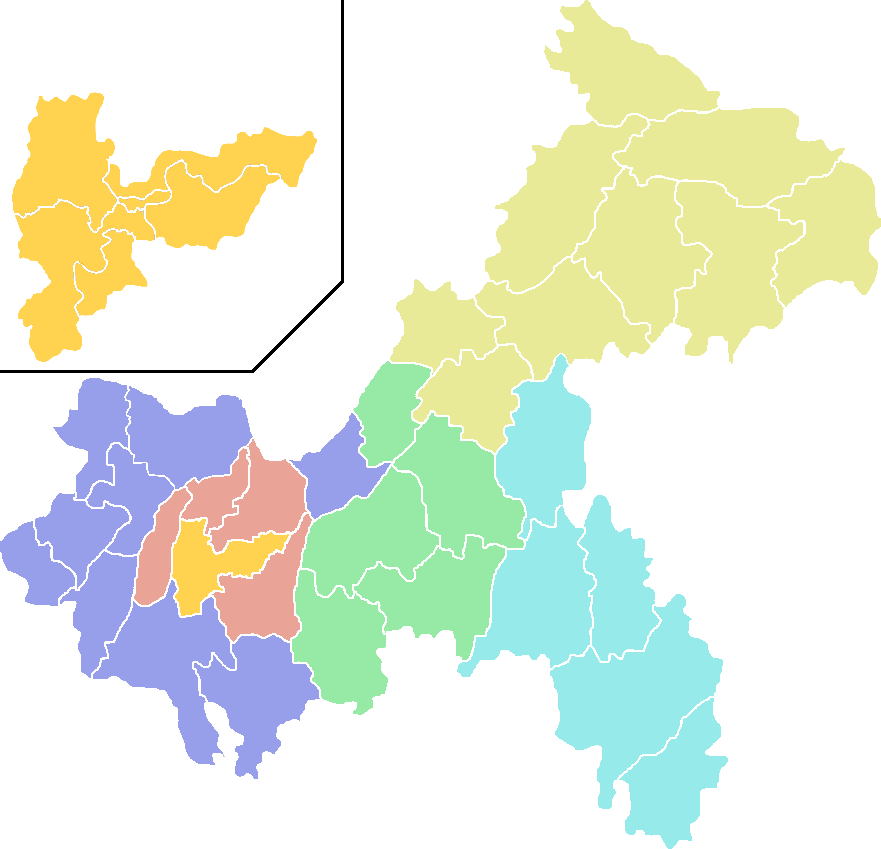

== Administrative divisions ==
All of these administrative divisions are explained in greater detail at Administrative divisions of the People's Republic of China. This chart lists only county-level divisions of Chongqing.

County Level							
Name	Chinese	Hanyu Pinyin	Division code		Area (km^{2})	Population (2020 census)	Density (/km^{2})
Wanzhou District	万州区	Wànzhōu Qū	500101	WZO	3,457	1,564,449	452
Fuling District	涪陵区	Fúlíng Qū	500102	FLG	2,946	1,115,016	378
Yuzhong District (City seat)	渝中区	Yúzhōng Qū	500103	YZQ	22	588,717	26,759
Dadukou District	大渡口区	Dàdùkǒu Qū	500104	DDK	103	421,904	4,096
Shapingba District	沙坪坝区	Shāpíngbà Qū	500106	SPB	383	1,477,345	3,857
Jiulongpo District	九龙坡区	Jiǔlóngpō Qū	500107	JLP	432	1,526,821	3,534
Nan'an District	南岸区	Nán'àn Qū	500108	NAQ	274	1,197,639	4,370
Beibei District	北碚区	Běibèi Qū	500109	BBE	755	834,887	1106
Qijiang District (Note: Qijiang District's population and area are the sums of Qijiang County and Wansheng District in sources.)	綦江区	Qíjiāng Qū	500110	QJC	2,748	1,011,334	368
Dazu District (Note: Dazu District's population and area are the sums of Dazu County and Shuangqiao District in sources.)	大足区	Dàzú Qū	500111	DZC	1,433	834,592	582
Banan District	巴南区	Bānán Qū	500113	BNN	1,825	1,178,856	646
Qianjiang District	黔江区	Qiánjiāng Qū	500114	QJU	2,397	487,281	203
Changshou District	长寿区	Chángshòu Qū	500115	CSO	1,415	692,960	490
Jiangjin District	江津区	Jiāngjīn Qū	500116	JJY	3,200	1,359,611	425
Hechuan District	合川区	Héchuān Qū	500117	HEC	2,356	1,245,294	529
Yongchuan District	永川区	Yǒngchuān Qū	500118	YCP	1,576	1,148,896	729
Nanchuan District	南川区	Nánchuān Qū	500119	NCU	2,602	572,362	220
Bishan District	璧山区	Bìshān Qū	500120	BSA	912	756,022	829
Tongliang District	铜梁区	Tóngliáng Qū	500151	TLQ	1,342	685,729	511
Tongnan District	潼南区	Tóngnán Qū	500152	TNT	1,585	688,115	434
Rongchang District	荣昌区	Róngchāng Qū	500153	RGQ	1,079	668,977	620
Kaizhou District	开州区	Kāizhōu Qū	500154	KZU	3,959	1,203,306	304
Liangping District	梁平区	Liángpíng Qū	500155	LPQ	1,890	645,315	341
Wulong District	武隆区	Wǔlóng Qū	500156	WLO	2,872	356,748	124
Liangjiang New Area	两江新区	Liǎngjiāng Xīnqū	500157		1,360	3,500,000 (Year 2025)	2588
Chengkou County	城口县	Chéngkǒu Xiàn	500229	CKO	3,286	197,497	60
Fengdu County	丰都县	Fēngdū Xiàn	500230	FDU	2,896	557,374	192
Dianjiang County	垫江县	Diànjiāng Xiàn	500231	DJG	1,518	650,694	429
Zhongxian County (Note: Official name registered by the Ministry of Civil Affairs.)	忠县	Zhōngxiàn	500233	ZHX	2,184	720,976	330
Yunyang County	云阳县	Yúnyáng Xiàn	500235	YNY	3,634	929,034	256
Fengjie County	奉节县	Fèngjié Xiàn	500236	FJE	4,087	744,836	182
Wushan County	巫山县	Wūshān Xiàn	500237	WSN	2,958	462,462	156
Wuxi County	巫溪县	Wūxī Xiàn	500238	WXX	4,030	388,685	96
Shizhu County (Note: Conventional name: Shizhu Tujia Autonomous County; Chinese: 石柱土家族自治县; pinyin: Shízhù Tǔjiāzú Zìzhìxiàn)	石柱县	Shízhù Xiàn	500240	SZY	3,013	389,001	129
Xiushan County (Note: Conventional name: Xiushan Tujia and Miao Autonomous County; Chinese: 秀山土家族苗族自治县; pinyin: Xiùshān Tǔjiāzú Miáozú Zìzhìxiàn)	秀山县	Xiùshān Xiàn	500241	XUS	2,450	496,194	202
Youyang County (Note: Conventional name: Youyang Tujia and Miao Autonomous County; Chinese: 酉阳土家族苗族自治县; pinyin: Yǒuyáng Tǔjiāzú Miáozú Zìzhìxiàn)	酉阳县	Yǒuyáng Xiàn	500242	YUY	5,173	607,338	117
Pengshui County (Note: Conventional name: Pengshui Miao and Tujia Autonomous County; Chinese: 彭水苗族土家族自治县; pinyin: Péngshuǐ Miáozú Tǔjiāzú Zìzhìxiàn)	彭水县	Péngshuǐ Xiàn	500243	PSU	3,903	530,599	136

== Main Urban Area of Chongqing ==
The main urban area of Chongqing city (重庆主城区), as officially defined, spans approximately 5,473 km^{2} (2,113 sq mi), and includes the following nine districts:

- Yuzhong District (渝中区, literally "Central Chongqing District"), the central and most densely populated district, where government and international business offices and the city's best shopping are located in the district's Jiefangbei CBD area. Yuzhong is located on the peninsula surrounded by Eling Hill, Yangtze River and Jialing River.
- Abolished Jiangbei District (江北区, literally "North of the River District"), located to the north of Jialing River.
- Shapingba District (沙坪坝区), roughly located between Jialing River and Zhongliang Mountain.
- Jiulongpo District (九龙坡区), roughly located between Yangtze River and Zhongliang Mountain.
- Nan'an District (南岸区, literally "Southern Bank District"), located on the south side of Yangtze River.
- Dadukou District (大渡口区)
- Banan District (巴南区, literally "Southern of Ba District"). Previously called Ba County, and changed to the current name in 1994.
- Abolished Yubei District (渝北区, or "Northern Chongqing District"). Previously called Jiangbei County, and changed into the current name in 1994.
- Beibei District (北碚区), a satellite district northwest of Chongqing.
- Liangjiang New Area (两江新区, literally "Two Rivers New Area"), a state-level new area established on 5 May, 2010. It became a formal district on 6 November, 2025, consisting of the former Jiangbei District, part of the former Yubei District, and part of Beibei District.

== Recent changes in administrative divisions ==
Date	Before	After	Note	Reference
1997-04-18	parts of Sichuan Province	Chongqing (Municipality)	provincial established	Civil Affairs Announcement
1997-04-18	★ Chongqing (PL-City)	provincial-controlled	reorganized & transferred	Civil Affairs Announcement
1997-04-18	↳ Yuzhong District	↳ Yuzhong District	transferred	Civil Affairs Announcement
1997-04-18	↳ Dadukou District	↳ Dadukou District	transferred	Civil Affairs Announcement
1997-04-18	↳ Jiangbei District	↳ Jiangbei District	transferred	Civil Affairs Announcement
1997-04-18	↳ Shapingba District	↳ Shapingba District	transferred	Civil Affairs Announcement
1997-04-18	↳ Jiulongpo District	↳ Jiulongpo District	transferred	Civil Affairs Announcement
1997-04-18	↳ Nan'an District	↳ Nan'an District	transferred	Civil Affairs Announcement
1997-04-18	↳ Beibei District	↳ Beibei District	transferred	Civil Affairs Announcement
1997-04-18	↳ Wansheng District	↳ Wansheng District	transferred	Civil Affairs Announcement
1997-04-18	↳ Shuangqiao District	↳ Shuangqiao District	transferred	Civil Affairs Announcement
1997-04-18	↳ Yubei District	↳ Yubei District	transferred	Civil Affairs Announcement
1997-04-18	↳ Banan District	↳ Banan District	transferred	Civil Affairs Announcement
1997-04-18	↳ Changshou County	↳ Changshou County	transferred	Civil Affairs Announcement
1997-04-18	↳ Qijiang County	↳ Qijiang County	transferred	Civil Affairs Announcement
1997-04-18	↳ Tongnan County	↳ Tongnan County	transferred	Civil Affairs Announcement
1997-04-18	↳ Tongliang County	↳ Tongliang County	transferred	Civil Affairs Announcement
1997-04-18	↳ Dazu County	↳ Dazu County	transferred	Civil Affairs Announcement
1997-04-18	↳ Rongchang County	↳ Rongchang County	transferred	Civil Affairs Announcement
1997-04-18	↳ Bishan County	↳ Bishan County	transferred	Civil Affairs Announcement
1997-04-18	↳ Yongchuan (CL-City)	↳ Yongchuan (CL-City)	transferred	Civil Affairs Announcement
1997-04-18	↳ Jiangjin (CL-City)	↳ Jiangjin (CL-City)	transferred	Civil Affairs Announcement
1997-04-18	↳ Hechuan (CL-City)	↳ Hechuan (CL-City)	transferred	Civil Affairs Announcement
1997-04-18	parts of Sichuan Province	Chongqing (Municipality)	provincial transferred	Civil Affairs Announcement
1997-04-18	★ Chongqing (PL-City)	provincial-controlled	disestablished & merged into	Civil Affairs Announcement
1997-04-18	☆ Fuling (PL-City)	provincial-controlled	disestablished & merged into	Civil Affairs Announcement
1997-04-18	↳ Zhicheng District	↳ Fuling District	disestablished & established	Civil Affairs Announcement
1997-04-18	↳ Lidu District	↳ Fuling District	disestablished & established	Civil Affairs Announcement
1997-04-18	↳ Dianjiang County	↳ Dianjiang County	transferred	Civil Affairs Announcement
1997-04-18	↳ Fengdu County	↳ Fengdu County	transferred	Civil Affairs Announcement
1997-04-18	↳ Wulong County	↳ Wulong County	transferred	Civil Affairs Announcement
1997-04-18	↳ Nanchuan (CL-City)	↳ Nanchuan (CL-City)	transferred	Civil Affairs Announcement
1997-04-18	parts of Sichuan Province	Chongqing (Municipality)	provincial transferred	Civil Affairs Announcement
1997-04-18	★ Chongqing (PL-City)	provincial-controlled	disestablished & merged into	Civil Affairs Announcement
1997-04-18	☆ parts of Wanxian (PL-City)	provincial-controlled	transferred & merged into	Civil Affairs Announcement
1997-04-18	↳ Longbao District	↳ Wanxian District	disestablished & established	Civil Affairs Announcement
1997-04-18	↳ Taincheng District	↳ Wanxian District	disestablished & established	Civil Affairs Announcement
1997-04-18	↳ Wuqiao District	↳ Wanxian District	disestablished & established	Civil Affairs Announcement
1997-04-18	parts of Sichuan Province	Chongqing (Municipality)	provincial transferred	Civil Affairs Announcement
1997-04-18	★ Chongqing (PL-City)	provincial-controlled	disestablished & merged into	Civil Affairs Announcement
1997-04-18	☆ Wanxian (PL-City)	Wanxian Migration; Development Area	reorganized & transferred	Civil Affairs Announcement
1997-04-18	↳ Zhong County	↳ Zhong County	transferred	Civil Affairs Announcement
1997-04-18	↳ Kai County	↳ Kai County	transferred	Civil Affairs Announcement
1997-04-18	↳ Yunyang County	↳ Yunyang County	transferred	Civil Affairs Announcement
1997-04-18	↳ Fengjie County	↳ Fengjie County	transferred	Civil Affairs Announcement
1997-04-18	↳ Wushan County	↳ Wushan County	transferred	Civil Affairs Announcement
1997-04-18	↳ Wuxi County	↳ Wuxi County	transferred	Civil Affairs Announcement
1997-04-18	parts of Sichuan Province	Chongqing (Municipality)	provincial transferred	Civil Affairs Announcement
1997-04-18	★ Chongqing (PL-City)	provincial-controlled	disestablished & merged into	Civil Affairs Announcement
1997-04-18	☆ Qianjiang Prefecture	Qianjiang Migration; Development Area	reorganized & transferred	Civil Affairs Announcement
1997-04-18	↳ Xiushan County (Aut.)	↳ Xiushan County (Aut.)	transferred	Civil Affairs Announcement
1997-04-18	↳ Youyang County (Aut.)	↳ Youyang County (Aut.)	transferred	Civil Affairs Announcement
1997-04-18	↳ Pengshui County (Aut.)	↳ Pengshui County (Aut.)	transferred	Civil Affairs Announcement
1997-04-18	↳ Shizhu County (Aut.)	↳ Shizhu County (Aut.)	transferred	Civil Affairs Announcement
1997-04-18	↳ Qianjiang County (Aut.)	↳ Qianjiang County (Aut.)	transferred	Civil Affairs Announcement
1998-05-22	Wanxian District	Wanzhou District	renamed	State Council [1998]37
2000-06-25	Wanxian Migration; Development Area	provincial-controlled	disestablished	State Council [2000]88
2000-06-25	↳ Zhong County	↳ Zhong County	transferred	State Council [2000]88
2000-06-25	↳ Kai County	↳ Kai County	transferred	State Council [2000]88
2000-06-25	↳ Yunyang County	↳ Yunyang County	transferred	State Council [2000]88
2000-06-25	↳ Fengjie County	↳ Fengjie County	transferred	State Council [2000]88
2000-06-25	↳ Wushan County	↳ Wushan County	transferred	State Council [2000]88
2000-06-25	↳ Wuxi County	↳ Wuxi County	transferred	State Council [2000]88
2000-06-25	Qianjiang Migration; Development Area	provincial-controlled	disestablished	State Council [2000]88
2000-06-25	↳ Xiushan County (Aut.)	↳ Xiushan County (Aut.)	transferred	State Council [2000]88
2000-06-25	↳ Youyang County (Aut.)	↳ Youyang County (Aut.)	transferred	State Council [2000]88
2000-06-25	↳ Pengshui County (Aut.)	↳ Pengshui County (Aut.)	transferred	State Council [2000]88
2000-06-25	↳ Shizhu County (Aut.)	↳ Shizhu County (Aut.)	transferred	State Council [2000]88
2000-06-25	↳ Qianjiang County (Aut.)	↳ Qianjiang District	transferred & reorganized	State Council [2000]88
2001-12-25	Changshou County	Changshou District	reorganized	State Council [2001]171
2006-10-22	Jiangjin (CL-City)	Jiangjin District	reorganized	State Council [2006]110
2006-10-22	Hechuan (CL-City)	Hechuan District	reorganized	State Council [2006]110
2006-10-22	Yongchuan (CL-City)	Yongchuan District	reorganized	State Council [2006]110
2006-10-22	Nanchuan (CL-City)	Nanchuan District	reorganized	State Council [2006]110
2011-10-22	Dazu County	Dazu District	reorganized	State Council [2011]129
2011-10-22	Shuangqiao District	Dazu District	merged into	State Council [2011]129
2011-10-22	Qijiang County	Qijiang District	reorganized	State Council [2011]129
2011-10-22	Wansheng District	Qijiang District	merged into	State Council [2011]129
2014-05-02	Bishan County	Bishan District	reorganized	State Council [2014]58
2014-05-02	Tongliang County	Tongliang District	reorganized	State Council [2014]58
2015-04-29	Rongchang County	Rongchang District	reorganized	State Council [2015]74
2015-04-29	Tongnan County	Tongnan District	reorganized	State Council [2015]74
2016-06-08	Kai County	Kaizhou District	reorganized	State Council [2016]99
2016-11-24	Liangping County	Liangping District	reorganized	State Council [2016]185
2016-11-24	Wulong County	Wulong District	reorganized	State Council [2016]185
2025-11-06	Jiangbei District	Liangjiang New Area	disestablished & established	
2025-11-06	part of Yubei District	Liangjiang New Area	disestablished & established	
2025-11-06	part of Beibei District	Liangjiang New Area	merged into	
2025-11-06	part of Yubei District	Beibei District	merged into	

== Historical divisions ==
=== ROC (1911–1949) ===
County / City	Present division
Chongqing City 重慶市	Yuzhong, Nan'an, Jiangbei
Wanxian City, Sichuan 萬縣市	Wanzhou
Ba County, Sichuan 巴縣	Jiulongpo, Shapingba, Dadukou, Ba'nan
Qijiang County, Sichuan 綦江縣	Qijiang
Tongliang County, Sichuan 銅梁縣	Tongliang
Dazu County, Sichuan 大足縣	Dazu
Bishan County, Sichuan 璧山縣	Bishan
Jiangjin County, Sichuan 江津縣	Jiangjin
Hechuan County, Sichuan 合川縣	Hechuan
Jiangbei County, Sichuan 江北縣	Yubei
Yongchuan County, Sichuan 永川縣	Yongchuan
Changshou County, Sichuan 長壽縣	Changshou
Nanchuan County, Sichuan 南川縣	Nanchuan
Qianjiang County, Sichuan 黔江縣	Qianjiang
Fuling County, Sichuan 涪陵縣	Fuling
Rongchang County, Sichuan 榮昌縣	Rongchang County
Wulong County, Sichuan 武隆縣	Wulong
Fengjie County, Sichuan 奉節縣	Fengjie County
Wushan County, Sichuan 巫山縣	Wushan County
Yunyang County, Sichuan 雲陽縣	Yunyang County
Wuxi County, Sichuan 巫溪縣	Wuxi County
Chengkou County, Sichuan 城口縣	Chengkou County
Dianjiang County, Sichuan 墊江縣	Dianjiang County
Tongnan County, Sichuan 潼南縣	Tongnan County
Wan County, Sichuan 萬縣	Wanzhou
Kai County, Sichuan 開縣	Kaizhou
Zhong County, Sichuan 忠縣	Zhong County
Liangshan District, Sichuan 梁山縣	Liangping
Pengshui County, Sichuan 彭水縣	Pengshui Miao and Tujia Autonomous County
Youyang County, Sichuan 酉陽縣	Youyang Tujia and Miao Autonomous County
Xiushan County, Sichuan 秀山縣	Xiushan Tujia and Miao Autonomous County
Shizhu County, Sichuan 石砫縣	Shizhu Tujia Autonomous County
Beibei Management Bureau, Sichuan 北碚管理局	Beibei
Nongxiang Bureau, Sichuan 酆都縣	part of Youyang Tujia and Miao Autonomous County
