= Duan Chenggang =

Chinese politician

- 段成刚

Vice Chairman of the Chongqing Municipal Committee of the Chinese People's Political Consultative Conference
- In office January 2022 – April 2025
- Chairman: Wang Jiong; Tang Fangyu

Personal details
- Born: June 1963 (age 63) Jiangbei District, Chongqing, China
- Party: Chinese Communist Party (1985–2025; expelled)
- Education: Chongqing Second Machinery Industry School; Chongqing University

Chinese name
- Simplified Chinese: 段成刚
- Traditional Chinese: 段成剛
Transcriptions
Standard Mandarin
- Hanyu Pinyin: Duàn Chénggāng

Duan Chenggang (Chinese: 段成刚; born June 1963) is a former Chinese politician who spent most of his career in southwest China's Chongqing. As of March 2025 he was under investigation by China's top anti-graft watchdog. Previously he served as vice chairman of the Chongqing Municipal Committee of the Chinese People's Political Consultative Conference.

== Early life and education ==
Duan was born in Jiangbei District, Chongqing, in June 1963. In 1980, he enrolled at Chongqing Second Machinery Industry School, where he majored in machine manufacturing.

== Career ==
After graduation in 1983, Duan became an official at Chongqing Machine Tool Industry Co., Ltd. He worked in the Chongqing Jiangbei District Committee of the Communist Youth League of China between January 1985 and May 1994. He joined the Chinese Communist Party (CCP) in June 1985. In March 1998, he became director of the Office of the CCP Chongqing Jiangbei District Committee, and held that office until April 2001, when he was appointed head of the United Front Work Department. He was elevated to vice governor of the district in February 2003. In December 2006, he was named acting governor of Banan District, confirmed in February 2007. He was deputy party secretary and director of the Management Committee of Chongqing North New Zone in January 2014, in addition to serving as deputy party secretary and deputy director of the Management Committee of Liangjiang New Area. He was promoted to party secretary of Yubei District in May 2016. He was appointed party secretary and director of the Management Committee of Chongqing Liangjiang New Area in October 2018 and was admitted to standing committee member of the CCP Chongqing Municipal Committee, the city's top authority. In January 2022, he took office as vice chairman of the Chongqing Municipal Committee of the Chinese People's Political Consultative Conference, the provincial advisory body.

== Downfall ==
On 31 March 2025, Duan was placed under investigation for "serious violations of laws and regulations" by the Central Commission for Discipline Inspection (CCDI), the party's internal disciplinary body, and the National Supervisory Commission, the highest anti-corruption agency of China. On September 28, he was stripped of his posts within the CCP and in the public office.

On 28 July 2026, Duan was sentenced to life imprisonment for taking bribes at the Guangzhou Intermediate People's Court.

Party political offices
Preceded by Li Ke (李科)	Governor of Banan District; 2006–2014	Succeeded by Chen Gang (陈刚)
Preceded by Chen Lüping	Director of the Management Committee of Liangjiang New Area; 2018–2021	Succeeded by Luo Lin
Government offices
Preceded by Mu Huaping	Communist Party Secretary of Yubei District; 2016–2018	Succeeded by Tang Chuan (唐川)
Preceded by Wu Cunrong	Party Secretary of Liangjiang New Area; 2016–2018	Succeeded by Zhang Hongxing
