= Huahuiyuan station =

Metro station in Chongqing, China

Huahuiyuan 花卉园
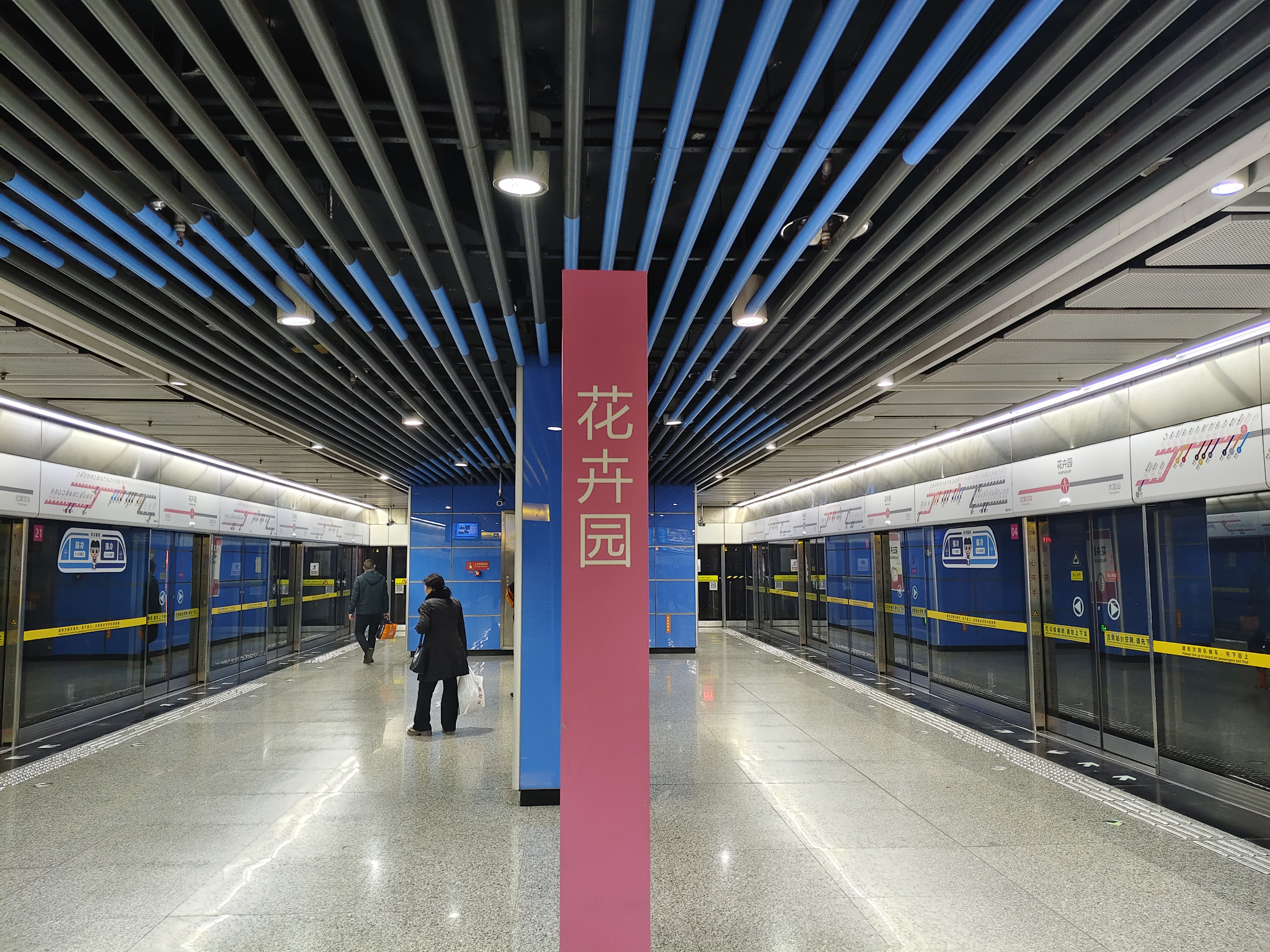
- Line 6 platforms

General information
- Location: Hongshi Road; Liangjiang New Area, Chongqing; China
- Coordinates: 29°35′09″N 106°30′32″E
- Operator: Chongqing Rail Transit Corp., Ltd
- Lines: Line 4 Line 6
- Platforms: 4 (2 island platform)

Construction
- Structure type: Underground

Other information
- Station code: / /

History
- Opened: 28 September 2012 (Line 6); 10 February 2026 (Line 4)

Services
Preceding station	Chongqing Rail Transit	Following station
Daqingcun towards Shimahelijiao	Line 4	Longxi towards Huangling
Hongqihegou towards Chayuan	Line 6	Dalongshan towards Beibei
Location

Huahuiyuan is a station on Line 4 and Line 6 of Chongqing Rail Transit in Chongqing Municipality, China. It is located in Yubei District. It opened in 2012 and Line 4 of this station opened at 10 February 2026.

== Station structure ==
B1; Concourse	Exits, Customer service, Vending machines
B2; Platforms	Line 6 to Beibei (Dalongshan)
B2; Platforms	Island platform
B2; Platforms	Line 6 to Chayuan (Hongqihegou)
