= Luo Lin (politician) =

Chinese politician (born 1971)

- 罗蔺

Party Secretary of Liangjiang New Area
- In office November 2025 – April 2026
- Preceded by: Himself (as the Party Working Committee Secretary)
- Succeeded by: Vacant

Party Working Committee Secretary of Liangjiang New Area
- In office July 2023 – November 2025
- Preceded by: Chen Mingbo
- Succeeded by: Position abolished (succeed by Party Secretary)

Personal details
- Born: April 1971 (age 55) Gulin County, Sichuan, China
- Party: Chinese Communist Party (1992-)
- Education: Southwest Normal University; Southwest University of Political Science and Law; Graduate School of Chinese Academy of Social Sciences

Luo Lin (Chinese: 罗蔺; born April 1971) is a former Chinese politician who served as the party working committee secretary of Liangjiang New Area in Chongqing from July 2023 to April 2026 (the party working committee secretary was changed to the party secretary in November 2025). He was a delegate to the 20th National Congress of the Chinese Communist Party.

== Career ==
Luo was born in Gulin County, Sichuan in April 1971. He was graduated from Southwest Normal University which majored in history in June 1994, and he enrolled to Southwest University of Political Science and Law civil procedure law major from June 1994 to July 1997.

After graduation from Southwest University of Political Science and Law, Luo was entered the court system until 2005. In November 2005, Luo was appointed as the executive deputy secretary of the Political and Legal Affairs Commission of the CCP Beibei District Committee, and the vice chairperson of the Standing Committee of the Beibei District People's Congress in March 2007.

In June 2010, Luo was served as the deputy director of the Legislative Affairs Office of Chongqing Municipal People's Government, and promoted to the director in 2017. He was also appointed as the vice mayor of Sanming, Fujian on temporary assignment in June 2014.

In July 2018, Luo was appointed as the deputy secretary-general of Chongqing Municipal People's Government.

In March 2021, Luo was appointed as the director of the Management Committee of Liangjiang New Area, and was admitted to standing committee member of the CCP Chongqing Municipal Committee in May 2022. He was served as the secretary-general of the CCP Chongqing Municipal Committee in June.

In July 2023, Luo was backed to Liangjiang New Area, and served as the party working committee secretary. In November 2025, Liangjiang New Area was upgraded to a municipal district, Luo was served as the first party secretary of Liangjiang New Area.

== Investigation ==
On 17 April 2026, Luo was suspected of "serious violations of laws and regulations" by the Central Commission for Discipline Inspection (CCDI), the party's internal disciplinary body, and the National Supervisory Commission, the highest anti-corruption agency of China.

Government offices
Preceded by Duan Chenggang	Director of the Management Committee of Liangjiang New Area; 2021-2022	Succeeded by Xu Hongqiu
Party political offices
Preceded by Li Mingqing	Secretary-general of the CCP Chongqing Municipal Committee; 2022-2023	Succeeded by Chen Xinwu
Preceded by Chen Mingbo	Party Working Committee Secretary of Liangjiang New Area; 2023-2025	Position abolished (succeed by Party Secretary)
New title Succeed from Party Working Committee Secretary	Party Secretary of Liangjiang New Area; 2025-2026	Succeeded by Xu Jian
