= Bijin Park =

Urban park in Chongqing, China

- Type: Urban park
- Location: Chongqing, China
- Area: 14 hectares (35 acres)
- Created: 1987
- Status: Open all year

Bijin Park (Chinese: 碧津公园; lit. 'Green Lakeshore Park') is an urban park in the Yubei District of Chongqing located in China. It is one of the largest parks in Lianglu region of Yubei, Chongqing, and is one of the facade parks of Chongqing Municipal. The park contains a lake of about 4.3 hectares, on which people can row boats. The park is also a major base to present the traditional folk culture of Chongqing, the Ba-Yu culture. It is also home to the memorial of Wang Pu, a communist educator who was killed by the KMT in Chongqing in 1949.
