= Shiziping station =

Metro station in Chongqing, China

Shiziping 狮子坪
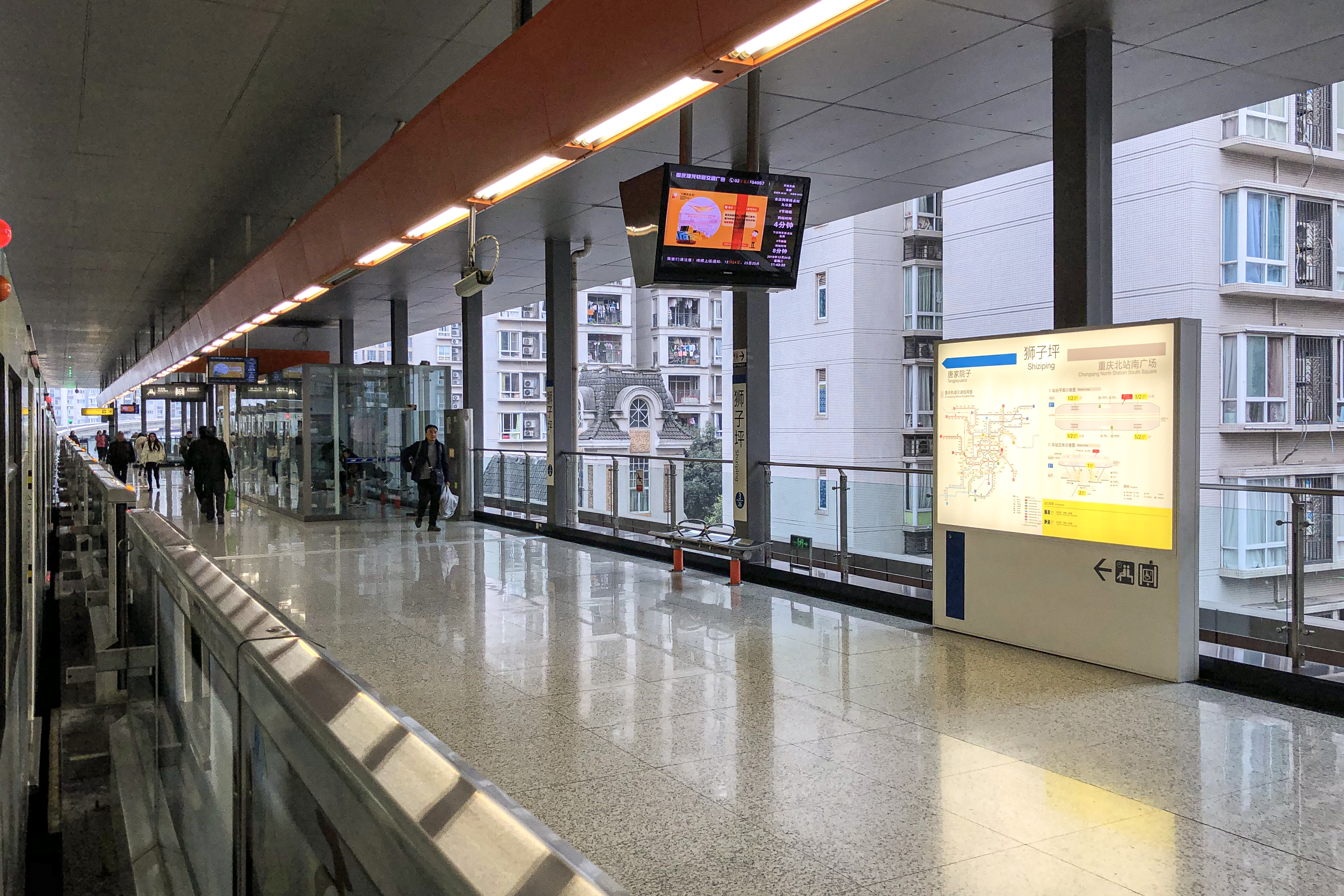
- Platform towards Yudong

Chinese name
- Simplified Chinese: 狮子坪站
- Traditional Chinese: 獅子坪站
Transcriptions
Standard Mandarin
- Hanyu Pinyin: Shīzipíng Zhàn

General information
- Location: Shulan Road (树兰路); Liangjiang New Area, Chongqing; China
- Coordinates: 29°36′15″N 106°32′44″E
- System: Chongqing Rail Transit
- Operator: Chongqing Rail Transit Operation Co., Ltd.
- Line: Line 3
- Platforms: 2 side platforms
- Tracks: 2

Construction
- Structure type: Elevated
- Accessible: Yes

Other information
- Station code: /

History
- Opened: 29 September 2011

Services
Preceding station	Chongqing Rail Transit	Following station
Tangjiayuanzi towards Yudong	Line 3	Chongqing N. Station S. Square towards Terminal 2 of Jiangbei Airport
Location

Shiziping is a station on Line 3 of Chongqing Rail Transit in Chongqing Municipality, China. It is located in Yubei District. It opened in 2011.

== Station structure ==
3F	Side platform, doors will open on the right
3F		Line 3 to Yudong (Tangjiayuanzi)
3F		Line 3 to Terminal 2 of Jiangbei Airport (Chongqing North Station South Square)
3F	Side platform, doors will open on the right
2F	Concourse	Customer service, vending machines, toilets
