= Ranjiaba station =

Metro station in Chongqing, China

Ranjiaba 冉家坝
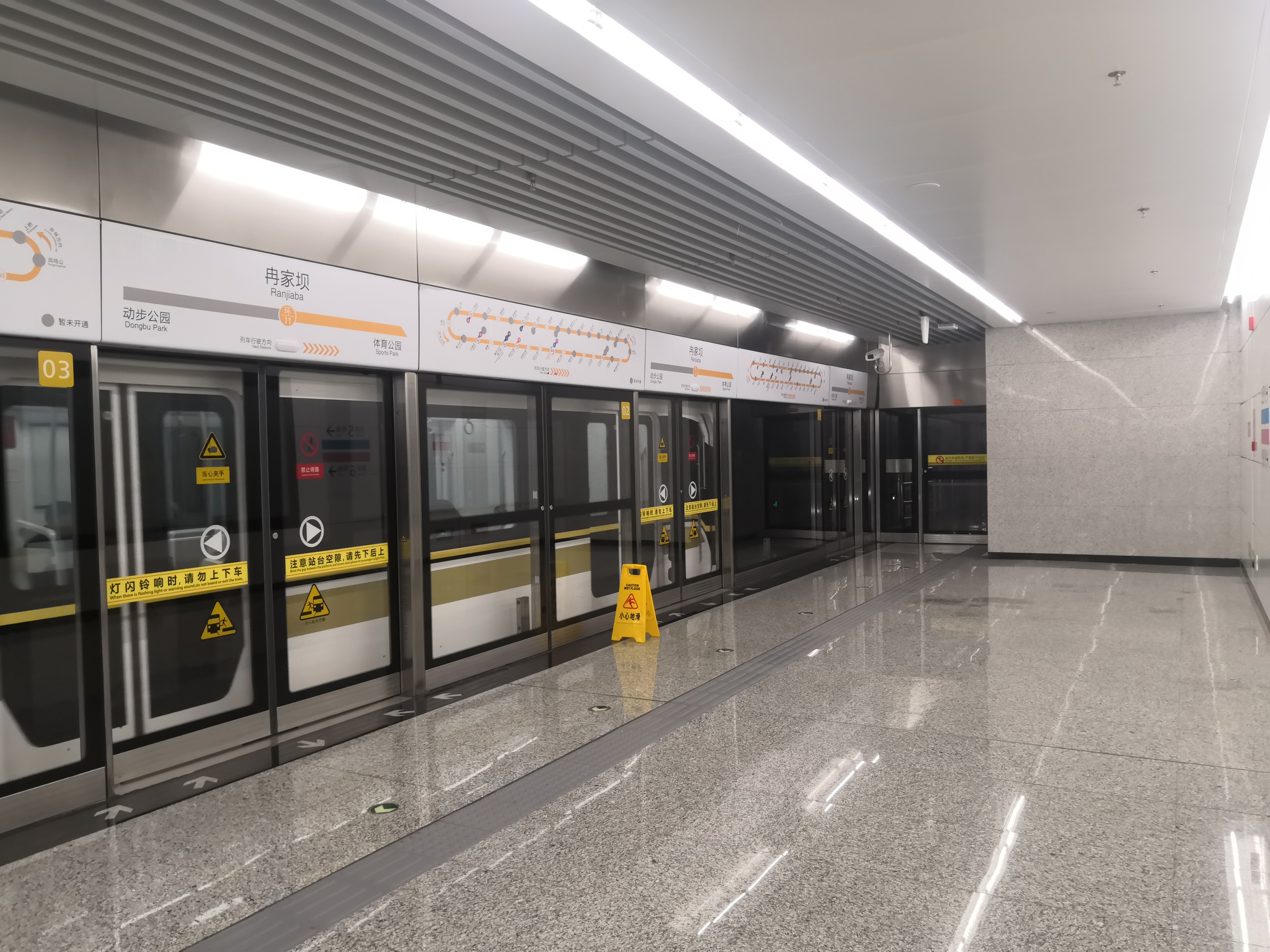
- Loop Line platform (Counterclockwise Loop)

General information
- Location: Chongqing; China
- Operator: Chongqing Rail Transit Corp., Ltd
- Lines: Line 5 Line 6 Loop line
- Platforms: 6 (2 island platforms and 2 side platforms)
- Connections: Bus

Construction
- Structure type: Underground
- Accessible: Yes

Other information
- Station code: / / /

History
- Opened: 20 January 2013; 13 years ago (Line 6); 28 December 2017; 8 years ago (Line 5); 28 December 2018; 7 years ago (Loop Line)

Services
Preceding station	Chongqing Rail Transit	Following station
Xingfu Square towards Yuegangbeilu	Line 5	Dalongshan towards Tiaodeng
Dalongshan towards Chayuan	Line 6	Guangdianyuan towards Beibei
Sports Park Counter-clockwise	Loop line	Dongbu Park Clockwise
Shapingba towards Tiaodeng	Loop line Express	Min'an Ave. towards Tangjiatuo
Location

Ranjiaba is a station on Line 5, Line 6, and the Loop Line of Chongqing Rail Transit in Chongqing Municipality, China. It is located in Yubei District and serves its surrounding area, including nearby office towers, residential blocks and a mall.

It opened on January 20, 2013, with Line 6. Line 5 services were later added on December 28, 2017. The station expanded exactly one year later with the opening of the Loop Line section of the station on December 28, 2018.

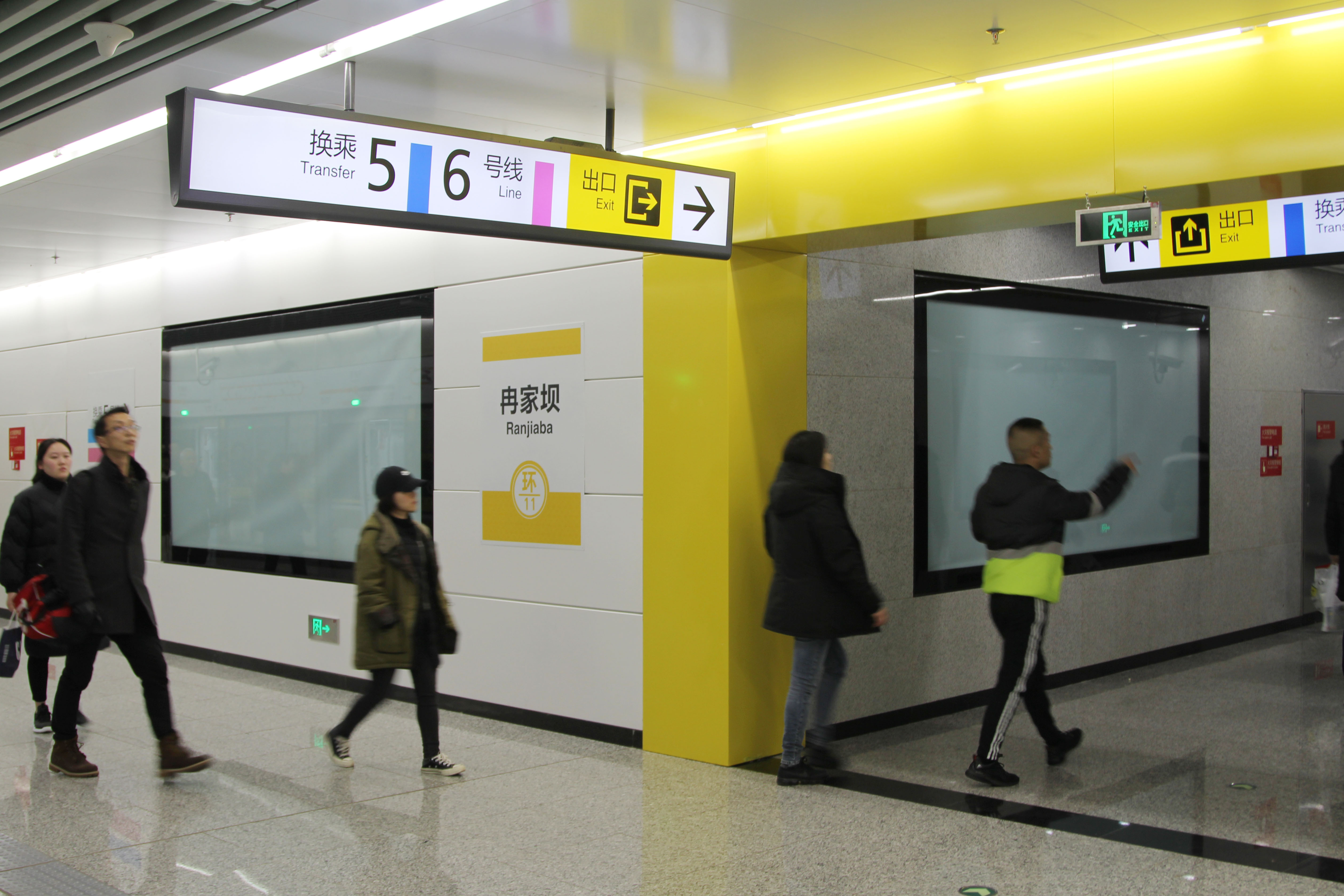
Exit and transfer directories at a Loop Line platform

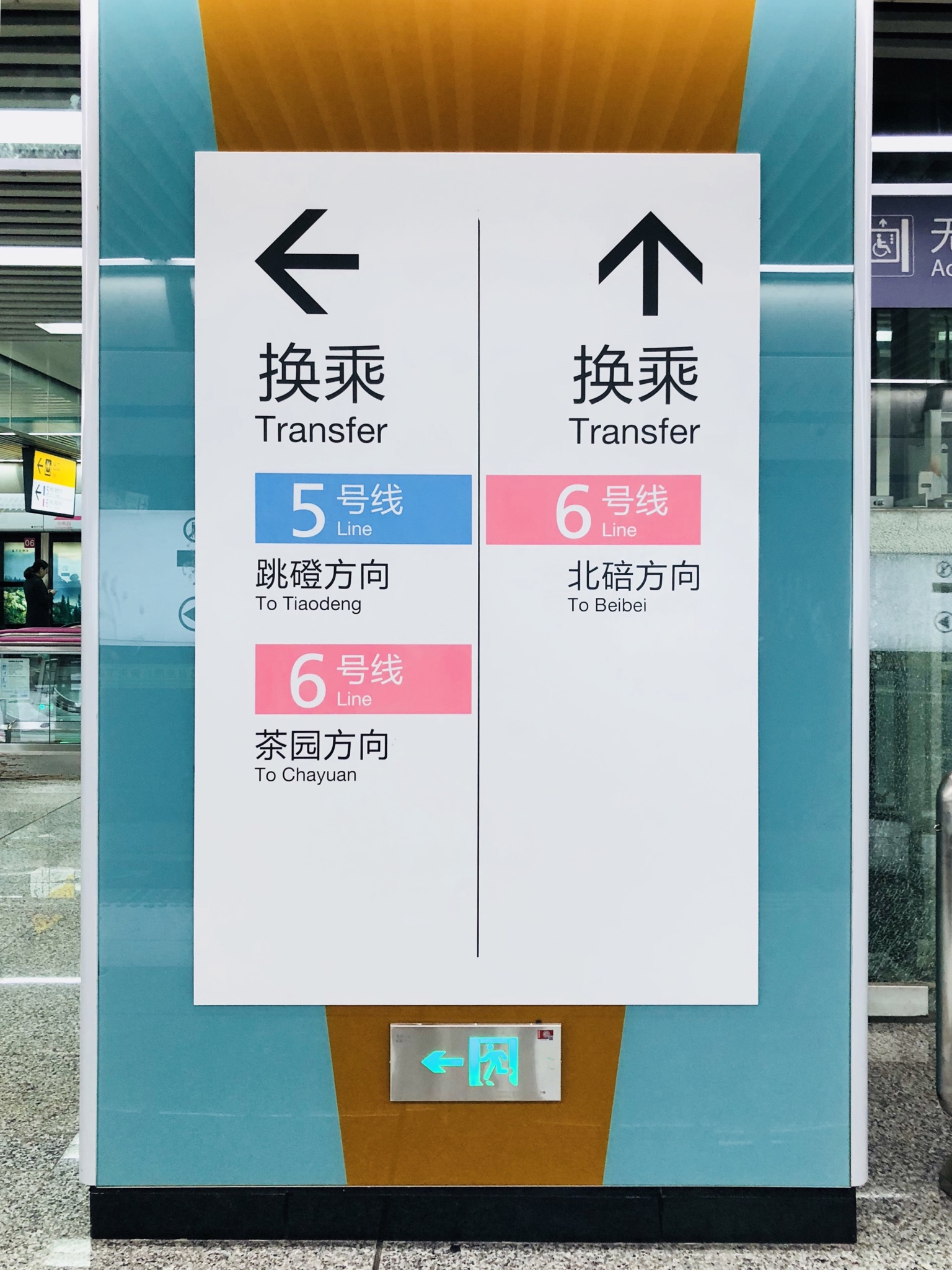
Transfer directories for cross-platform interchange and opposite direction trains of the Line 5/Line 6 island platform on B2

== Station structure ==
A total of 2 island platforms are used for Line 5 and Line 6 trains travelling in both directions. These 2 platforms were designed with cross-platform interchange in mind and were built during the construction of Line 6. Spaces on the opposite end of the platforms were reserved for Line 5 at the time and came into use when the metro line became operational in 2017.

There are 2 side platforms for Loop Line trains.

B3; Concourse	Exits, Customer service, Vending machines
B4; Platforms	Line 6 to Beibei (Guangdianyuan)
B4; Platforms	Island platform
B4; Platforms	Line 5 to Yuegangbeilu (Xingfu Square)
B5; Platforms	Line 6 to Chayuan (Dalongshan)
B5; Platforms	Island platform
B5; Platforms	Line 5 to Tiaodeng (Dalongshan)
B6; Platforms	Side platform
B6; Platforms	Loop line counterclockwise loop (Sports Park)
B6; Platforms	Loop line clockwise loop (Dongbu Park)
B6; Platforms	Side platform
