= Wenlong Subdistrict =

Wenlong Subdistrict 文龙街道
- Subdistrict
- Location in Chongqing.
- Coordinates: 29°02′13″N 106°39′54″E
- Country: People's Republic of China
- Municipality: Chongqing
- District: Qijiang

Area
  - Total: 122.45 km^{2} (47.28 sq mi)

Population (2010)
  - Total: 121,058
  - Density: 988.63/km^{2} (2,560.5/sq mi)
- Time zone: UTC+08:00 (China Standard)
- Postal code: 401420
- Area code: 023

Chinese name
- Traditional Chinese: 文龍街道
- Simplified Chinese: 文龙街道
Transcriptions
Standard Mandarin
- Hanyu Pinyin: Wénlóng Jiēdào

Wenlong Subdistrict (Chinese: 文龙街道) is a subdistrict in Qijiang District of Chongqing, China. As of the 2010 census it had a population of 121,058 and an area of 122.45 square kilometres (47.28 sq mi). The subdistrict is bordered to the north by the towns of Xinsheng and Anlan, to the east by the towns of Hengshan, Sanjiao, Shijiao and Sanjiang Subdistrict, to the south by Gunan Subdistrict, and to the west by the towns of Guangxing and Dushi.

== History ==
Wenlong Subdistrict was established on December 1, 2007.

On 22 June 2020, parts of the subdistrict were submerged, with some roads underwater.

== Administrative division ==
As of December 2019, the subdistrict is divided into seven villages and thirteen communities:

- Mengjiayuan Community (孟家院社区)
- Caiba Community (菜坝社区)
- Shifogang Community (石佛岗社区)
- Daijiagang Community (代家岗社区)
- Changshenggou Community (长生沟社区)
- Yangjiawan Community (杨家湾社区)
- Hetaowan Community (核桃湾社区)
- Jiulong Community (九龙社区)
- Shuanglong Community (双龙社区)
- Huilongwan Community (回龙湾社区)
- Shaxi Community (沙溪社区)
- Tianqiao Community (天桥社区)
- Wenlong Community (文龙社区)
- Hongqi (红旗村)
- Chundeng (春灯村)
- Dongwu (东五村)
- Songbang (松榜村)
- Taigong (太公村)
- Baimiao (白庙村)
- Jinchai (金钗村)

== Geography ==
The Qi River flows through the subdistrict.

== Economy ==
The local economy is primarily based upon agriculture and local industry.

== Transport ==
The G75 Lanzhou–Haikou Expressway passes across the town north to south.

== See also ==
- List of township-level divisions of Chongqing
