= Country Style Cooking =

Chinese fast food restaurant chain

Country Style Cooking Restaurant Chain Co., Ltd.
- Type: Private
- Industry: Restaurants
- Genre: Chinese fast food
- Founded: November 23, 1996
- Founder: Li Hong, Zhang Xingqiang
- Headquarters: Chongqing, China
- Number of locations: 948 (2020)
- Area served: China
- Number of employees: 7,119
- Website: www.csc100.com

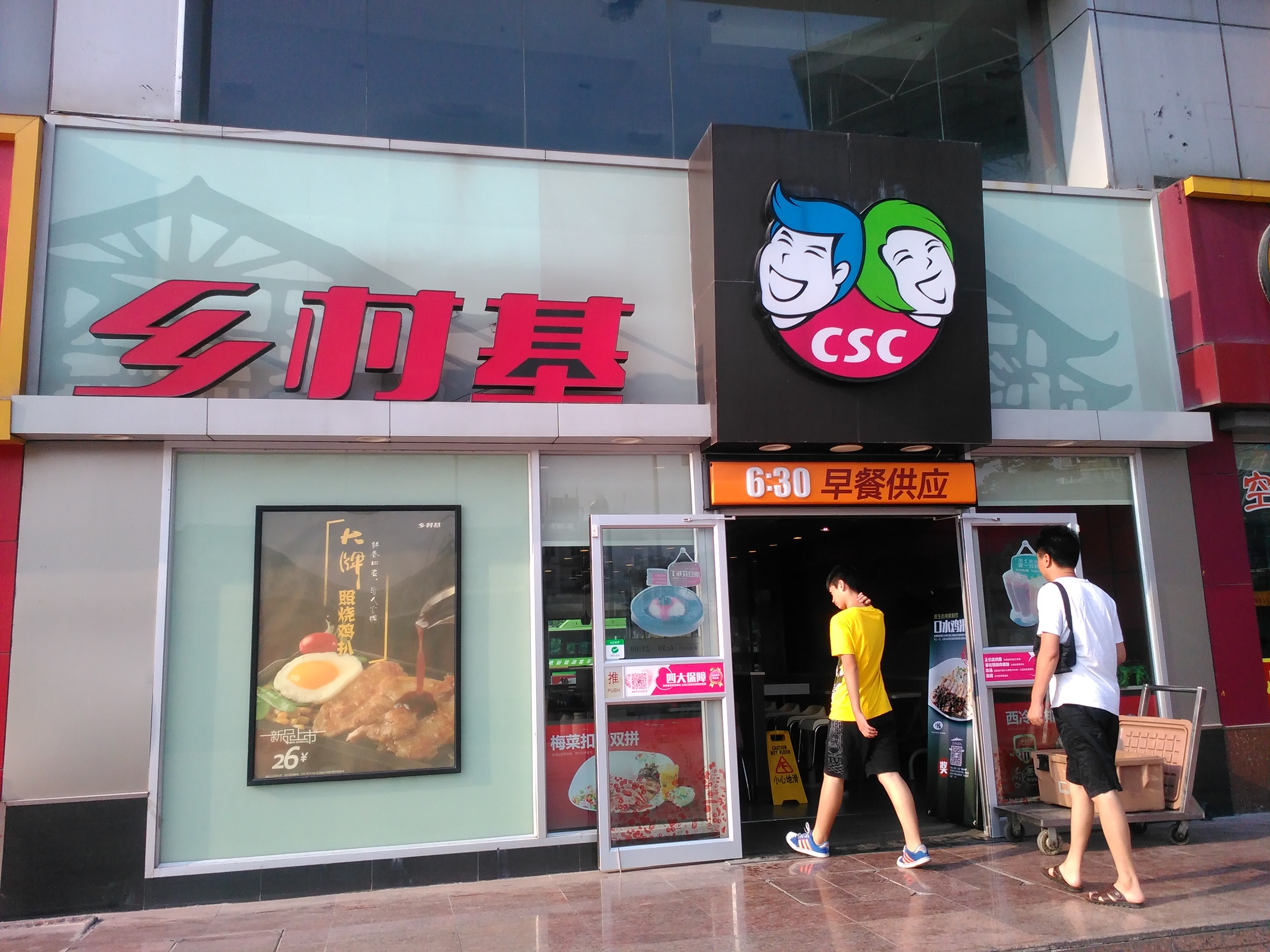
A Country Style Cooking restaurant in Chongqing

Country Style Cooking (Chongqing) Investment Co., Ltd.
- Simplified Chinese: 乡村基（重庆）投资有限公司
- Traditional Chinese: 鄉村基（重慶）投資有限公司
Transcriptions
Standard Mandarin
- Hanyu Pinyin: Xiāngcūnjī Tóuzī (Chóngqìng) Yǒuxiàngōngsī

Country Style Cooking Restaurant Chain Co., Ltd., doing business as Country Style Cooking or CSC (simplified Chinese: 乡村基; traditional Chinese: 鄉村基; pinyin: Xiāngcūnjī), is a Chinese fast food restaurant chain. The company is incorporated in the Cayman Islands and has its headquarters in Yubei District, Chongqing Municipality.

== History ==
The chain was established in 1996, and its original name was 乡村鸡. In January 2008 the company had nine restaurants.

As of 2013 it has 250 restaurants in Chongqing Municipality, Sichuan, Guizhou, Hunan, Shaanxi, and Yunnan. As of that year is the largest fast food restaurant brand within Chongqing Municipality and the only restaurant chain headquartered in Asia that has a listing on the New York Stock Exchange. As of 2013 the chief financial officer is Adam Zhao.

As of September 2014 there were 332 restaurants.

== Operations ==
As of 2015 it has elements of Sichuan cuisine and each restaurant has a total of 20 employees. The time to prepare a meal is usually 60 seconds from ordering. In 2014 James Roy, a China Market Research Group senior analyst, stated that CSC was "really strong in western China".
