= Chongqing Municipal Administration of Prisons =

Prison service agency of Chongqing, China

Chongqing Municipal Administration of Prisons (重庆市监狱管理局) is the prison service agency of Chongqing, a direct-controlled municipality in China. Its headquarters are in Yubei District.

== Prisons ==
- Chongqing Women's Prison
