= Hongqihegou station =

Metro station in Chongqing, China

Hongqihegou 红旗河沟
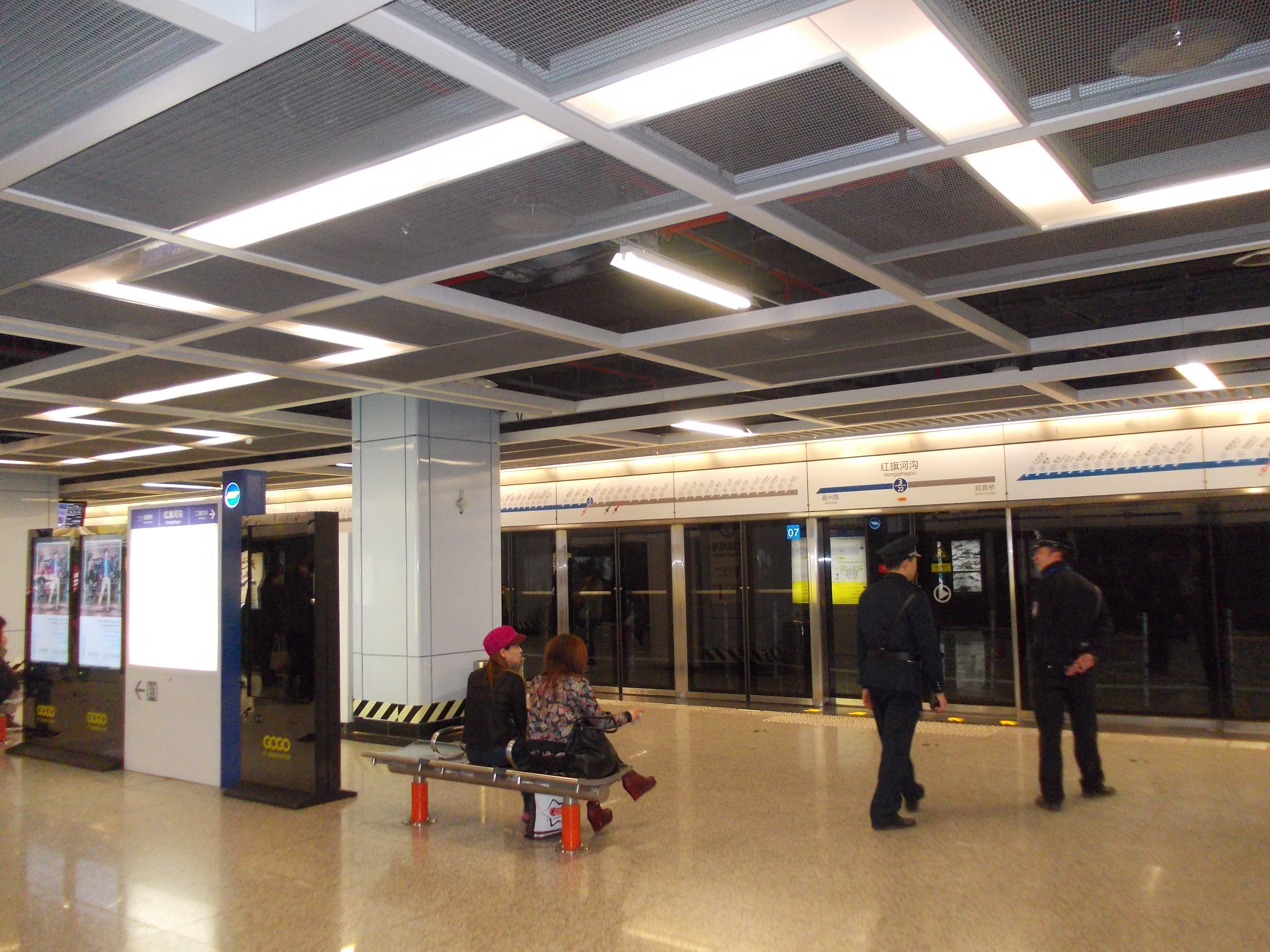
- Line 3 platform

General information
- Location: Yubei District, Chongqing; China
- Operator: Chongqing Rail Transit Corp., Ltd
- Lines: Line 3 Line 6
- Platforms: 4 (1 island platform and 2 side platforms)

Construction
- Structure type: Underground

Other information
- Station code: 3/22, 6/12

History
- Opened: 1 March 2012; 14 years ago (Line 3); 28 September 2012; 14 years ago (Line 6)

Services
Preceding station	Chongqing Rail Transit	Following station
Guanyinqiao towards Yudong	Line 3	Jiazhoulu towards Terminal 2 of Jiangbei Airport
Huangnibang towards Chayuan	Line 6	Huahuiyuan towards Beibei
Location

Hongqihegou is an interchange station between Line 3 and Line 6 of Chongqing Rail Transit in Chongqing Municipality, China, which opened in 2012. It is located in Yubei District.

== Station structure ==
B1; Concourse	Exits, Customer service, Vending machines, Toilets
B2; Platforms	Line 3 to Yudong (Guanyinqiao)
B2; Platforms	Island platform
B2; Platforms	Line 3 to Terminal 2 of Jiangbei Airport (Jiazhoulu)
B3; Platforms	Side platform
B3; Platforms	Line 6 to Beibei (Huahuiyuan)
B3; Platforms	Line 6 to Chayuan (Huangnibang)
B3; Platforms	Side platform

== Gallery ==
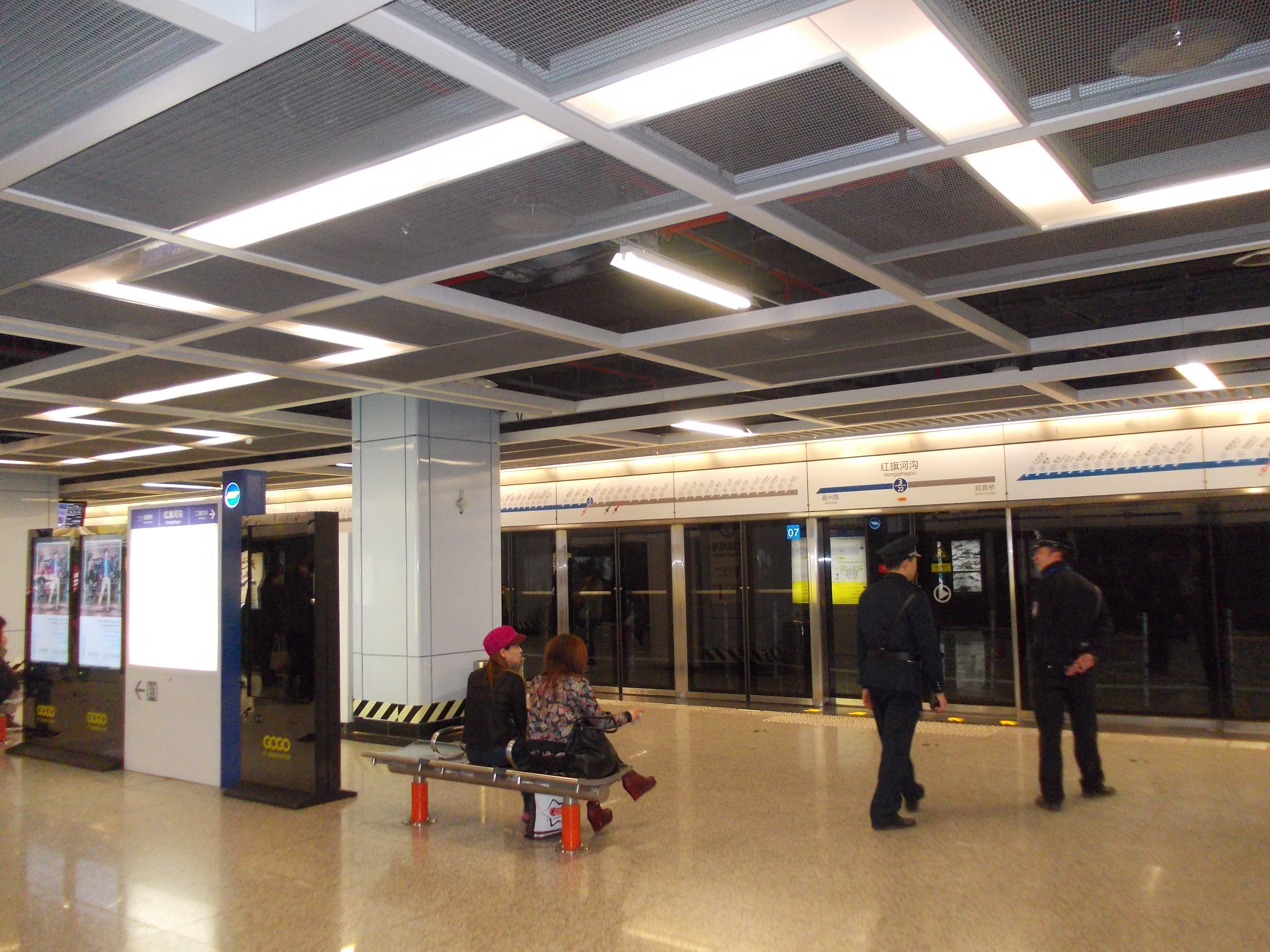
Line 3 platform

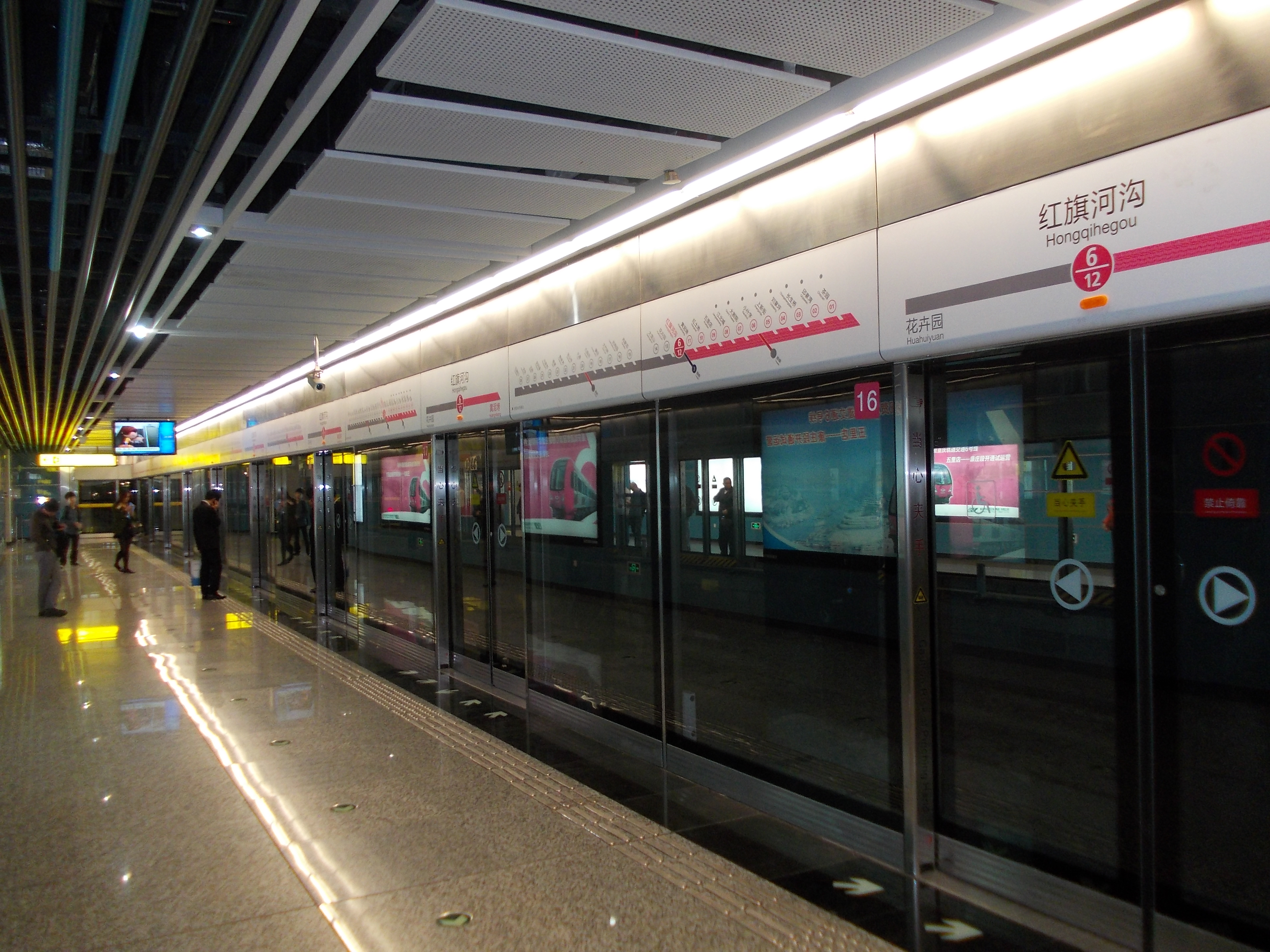
Line 6 platform
