= Zhengjiayuanzi station =

Railway station in Chongqing, China

Zhengjiayuanzi 郑家院子
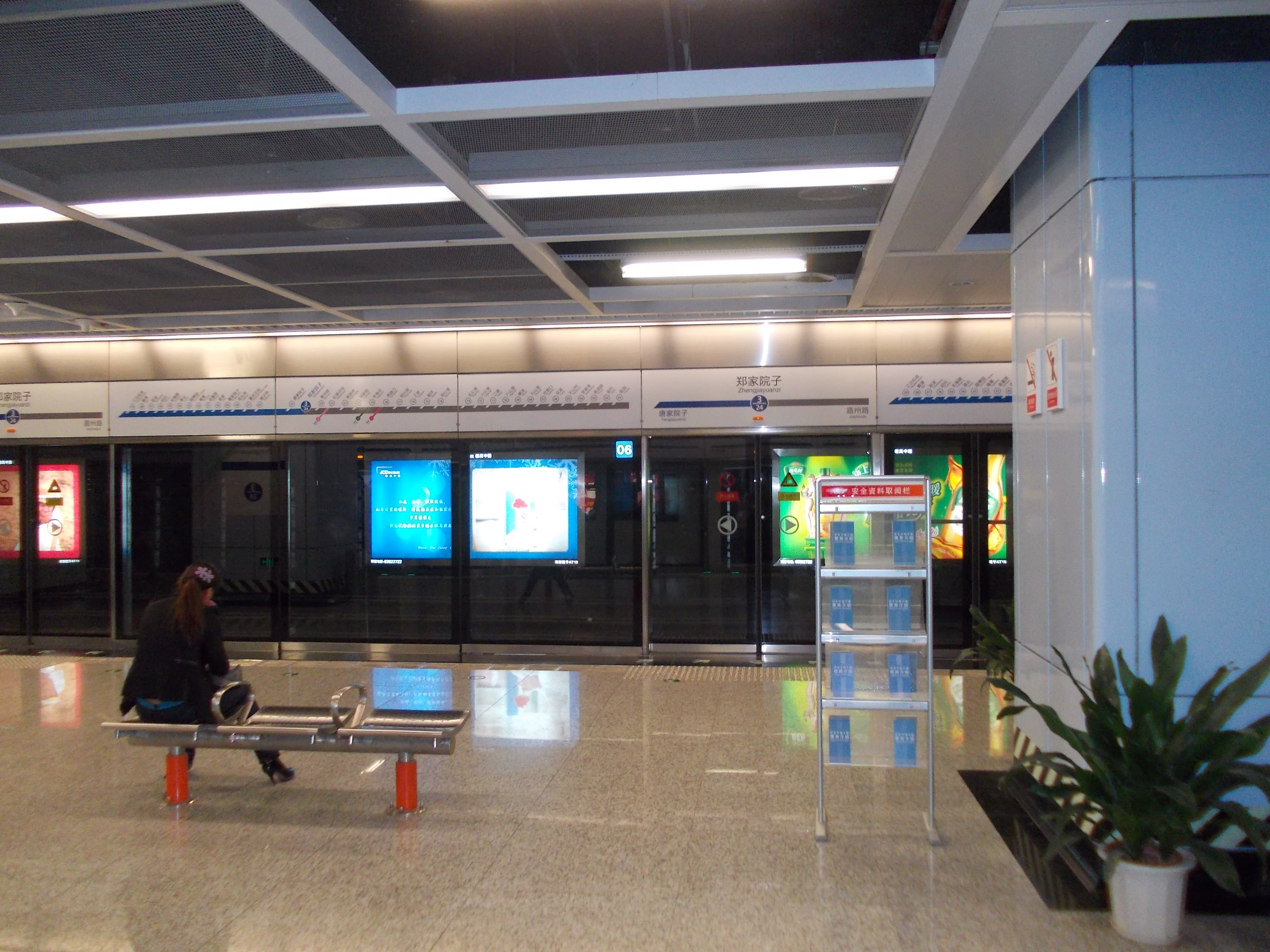

General information
- Location: Yubei District, Chongqing; China
- Coordinates: 29.60236°N 106.52665°E
- Operator: Chongqing Rail Transit Corp., Ltd
- Line: Line 3
- Platforms: 2 (1 island platform)

Construction
- Structure type: Underground

Other information
- Station code: 3/24

History
- Opened: 1 May 2012

Services
Preceding station	Chongqing Rail Transit	Following station
Jiazhoulu towards Yudong	Line 3	Tangjiayuanzi towards Terminal 2 of Jiangbei Airport
Location

Zhengjiayuanzi is a station on Line 3 of Chongqing Rail Transit in Chongqing Municipality, China. It is located in Yubei District. It opened as an infill station in 2012.

== Station structure ==
B1; Concourse	Exits, Customer service, Vending machines, Toilets
B2; Platforms	Line 3 to Yudong (Jiazhoulu)
B2; Platforms	Island platform
B2; Platforms	Line 3 to Terminal 2 of Jiangbei Airport (Tangjiayuanzi)
