= Guanyinqiao station =

Metro station in Chongqing, China

Guanyinqiao 观音桥
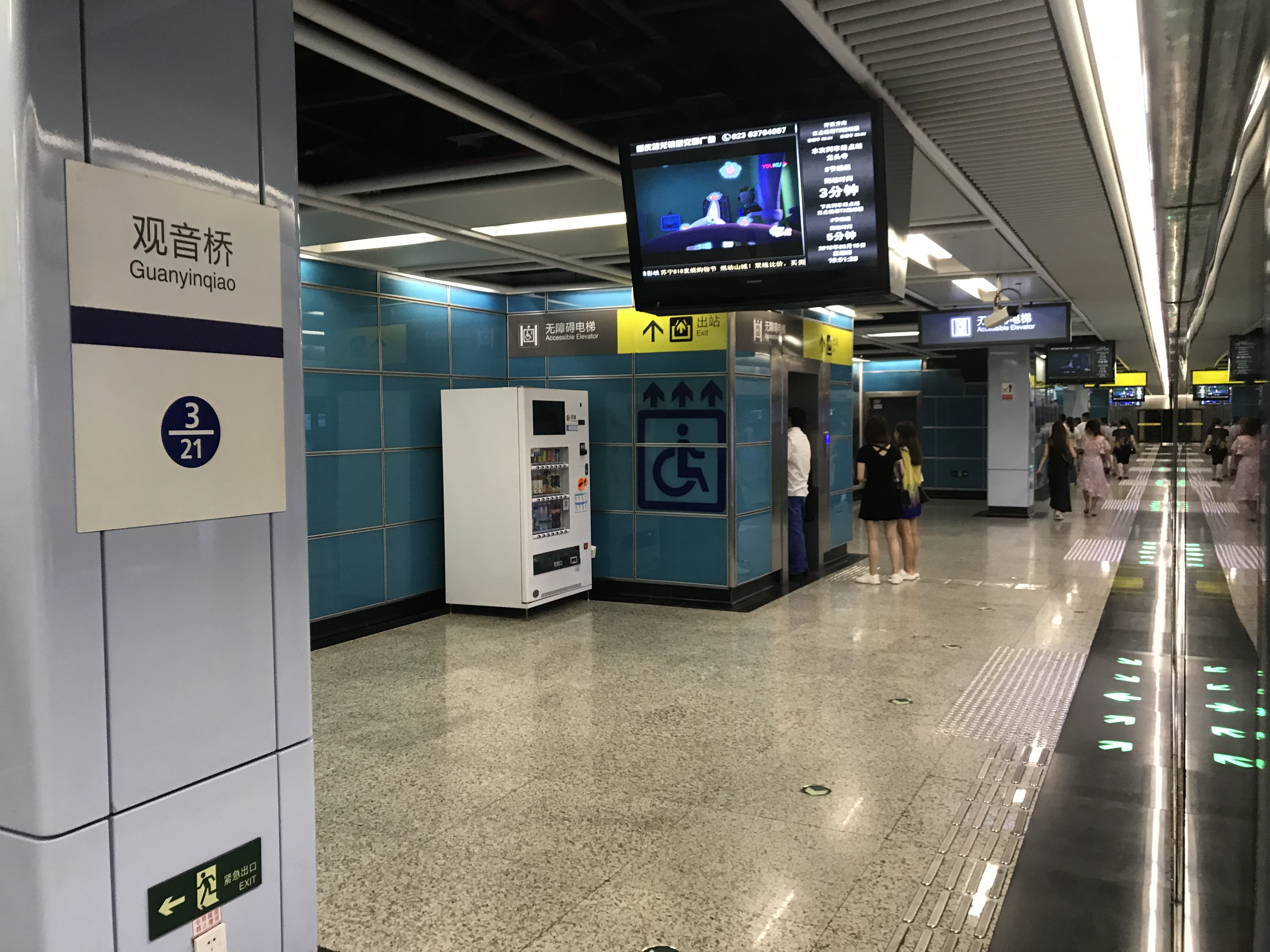
- Platform of Line 3

General information
- Location: Guanyinqiao Subdistrict, Jiangbei District, Chongqing; China
- Operated by: Chongqing Rail Transit Corp., Ltd
- Lines: Line 3 Line 9
- Platforms: 4 (2 side platforms and 1 island platform)

Construction
- Structure type: Underground

Other information
- Station code: / /

History
- Opened: 29 September 2011 (Line 3); 25 January 2022 (Line 9)

Services
Preceding station	Chongqing Rail Transit	Following station
Huaxinjie towards Yudong	Line 3	Hongqihegou towards Terminal 2 of Jiangbei Airport
Mahuangliang towards Gaotanyan	Line 9	Liyuchi towards Huashigou
Location

Guanyinqiao is an interchange station on Line 3 and Line 9 of Chongqing Rail Transit in Chongqing Municipality, China. It is located in the Jiangbei District. It opened on 29 September 2011 with the opening of Line 3. On 25 January 2022, it became an interchange station with the opening of Line 9.

Nevertheless, due to the transfer passage is still under construction, all passengers transferring between the two lines at this station must exit the station first.

== Station structure ==
=== Line 3 ===
B1; Concourse	Exits 1-5, Customer service, Vending machines, Toilets
B2; Platforms	Side platform
B2; Platforms	Line 3 to Terminal 2 of Jiangbei Airport (Hongqihegou)
B2; Platforms	Line 3 to Yudong (Huaxinjie)
B2; Platforms	Side platform

=== Line 9 ===
B1; Concourse	Exits 6-8, Customer service, Vending machines
B2; Platforms	Line 9 to Gaotanyan (Mahuangliang)
B2; Platforms	Island platform
B2; Platforms	Line 9 to Huashigou (Liyuchi)
