= Huangnibang station =

Metro station in Chongqing, China

Huangnibang 黄泥磅
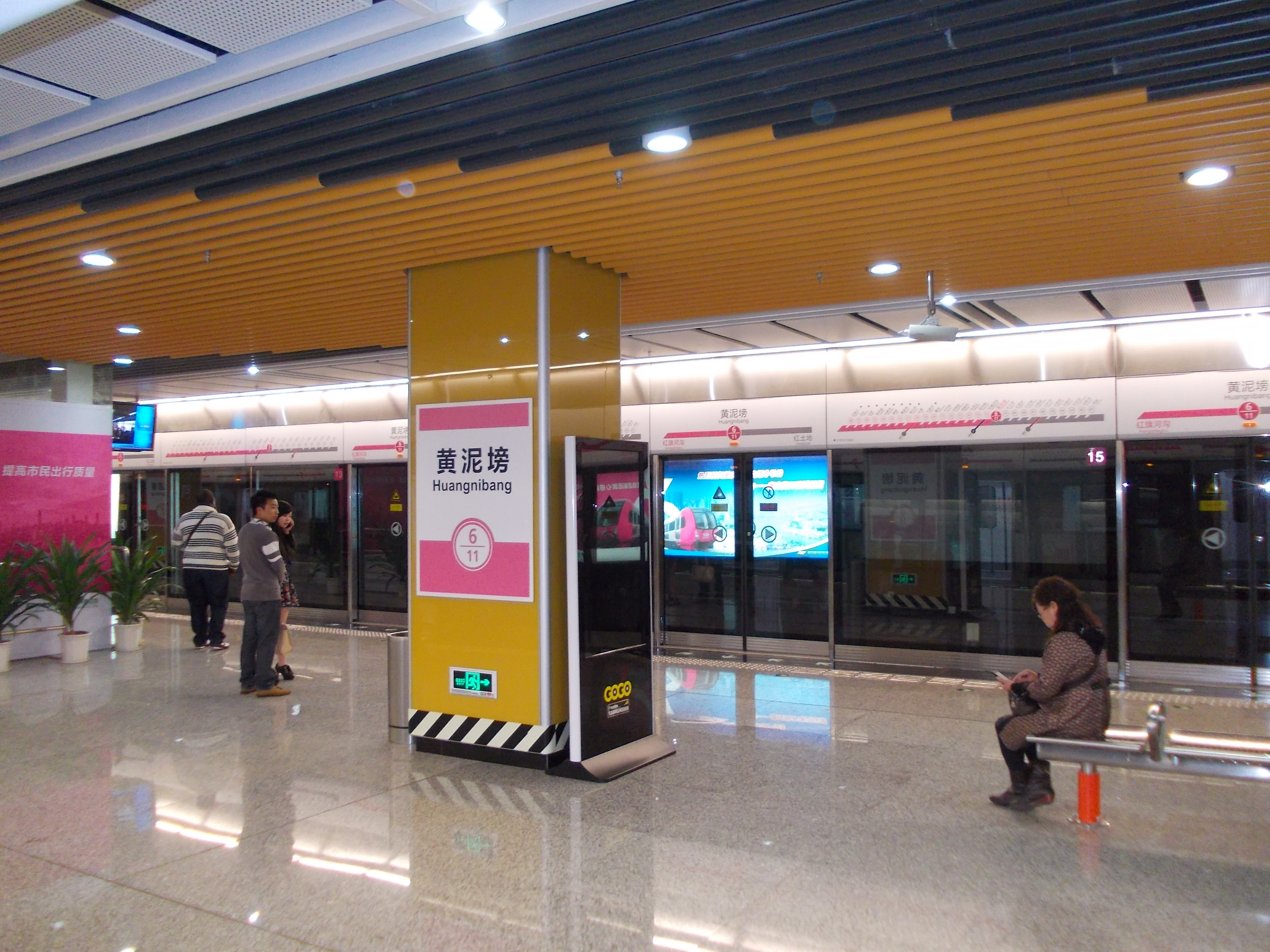

General information
- Location: Chongqing; China
- Operated by: Chongqing Rail Transit Corp., Ltd
- Line: Line 6
- Platforms: 2 (1 island platform)

Construction
- Structure type: Underground

Other information
- Station code: 6/11

History
- Opened: 28 September 2012; 13 years ago

Services
Preceding station	Chongqing Rail Transit	Following station
Hongtudi towards Chayuan	Line 6	Hongqihegou towards Beibei
Location

Huangnibang is a station on Line 6 of Chongqing Rail Transit in Chongqing Municipality, China. It is located in Jiangbei District. It opened in 2012.

== Station structure ==
B1; Concourse	Exits, Customer service, Vending machines
B2; Platforms	Line 6 to Beibei (Hongqihegou)
B2; Platforms	Island platform
B2; Platforms	Line 6 to Chayuan (Hongtudi)
