= Qi River (tributary of Yangtze River) =

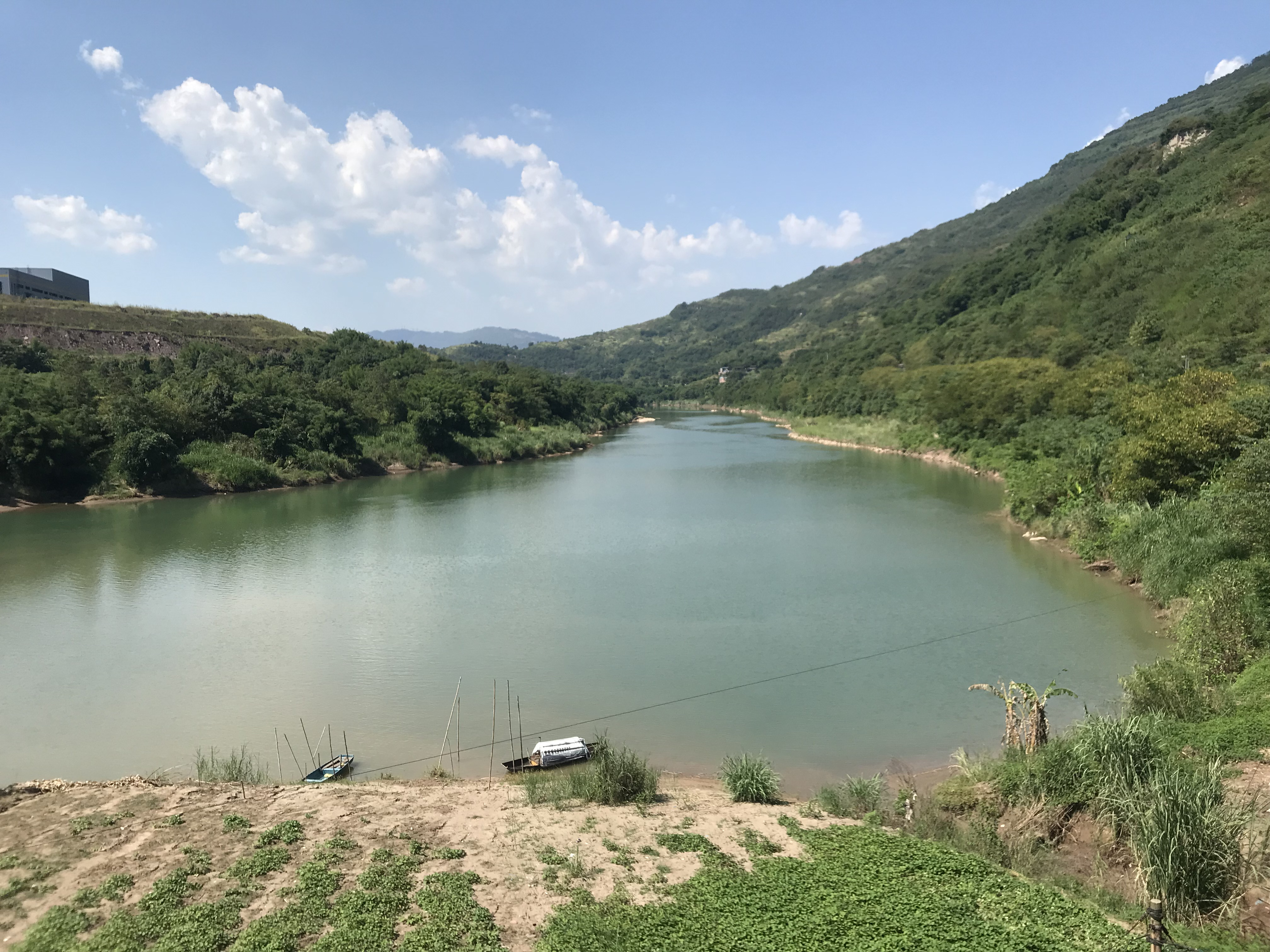
- Qi River near Zhuanguankou.

- Location in Chongqing
- Native name: 綦江 (Chinese)

Physical characteristics
- Source: Mount Wumeng (乌蒙山)
  - location: Tongzi County, Guizhou
- Mouth: Yangtze
  - location: Zhiping Town, Jiangjin District, Chongqing
  - coordinates: 29°17′28″N 106°23′27″E
- Length: 217 km (135 mi)
- Basin size: 6,902 km^{2} (2,665 mi^{2})

Chinese name
- Chinese: 綦江
Transcriptions
Standard Mandarin
- Hanyu Pinyin: Qí Jiāng

Qi River (Chinese: 綦江; pinyin: Qí Jiāng) is a river in southwest China's Guizhou and Chongqing. It is 217 square kilometres (84 mi^{2}) long and is a tributary of Yangtze River, draining an area of 6,902 square kilometres (2,665 sq mi). It rises in northwestern Guizhou's Tongzi County, and flows generally north, passing through the center of Chongqing and joining the Yangtze River in Zhiping Town of Jiangjin District.

Qi River flows through Tongzi County and Xishui County of Guizhou Province and Qijiang District, Jiangjin District, Nanchuan District and Banan District of Chongqing City.

Qi River's main tributaries include Xiangma River (响马河), Qixi River (清溪河), Yangdu River (杨渡河), Zaodu River (藻渡河), Tonghui River (通惠河), Sunxi River (笋溪河), and Wenshui River (温水河).

== History ==
At 20:00 p.m. on June 22, 2020, the "Qijiang Wucha Hydrological Station" (綦江五岔水文站) in Jiasi Town recorded a water level of 205.85 metres (675.4 ft), which was 5.34 metres (17.5 ft) higher than the guaranteed water level (200.51 metres (657.8 ft)). The Qijiang Wucha Hydrological Station reached 205.85 metres (675.4 ft), topping the previous record of 205.55 metres (674.4 ft) in 1998 China floods.
