= Jiazhoulu station =

Metro station in Chongqing, China

Jiazhoulu 嘉州路
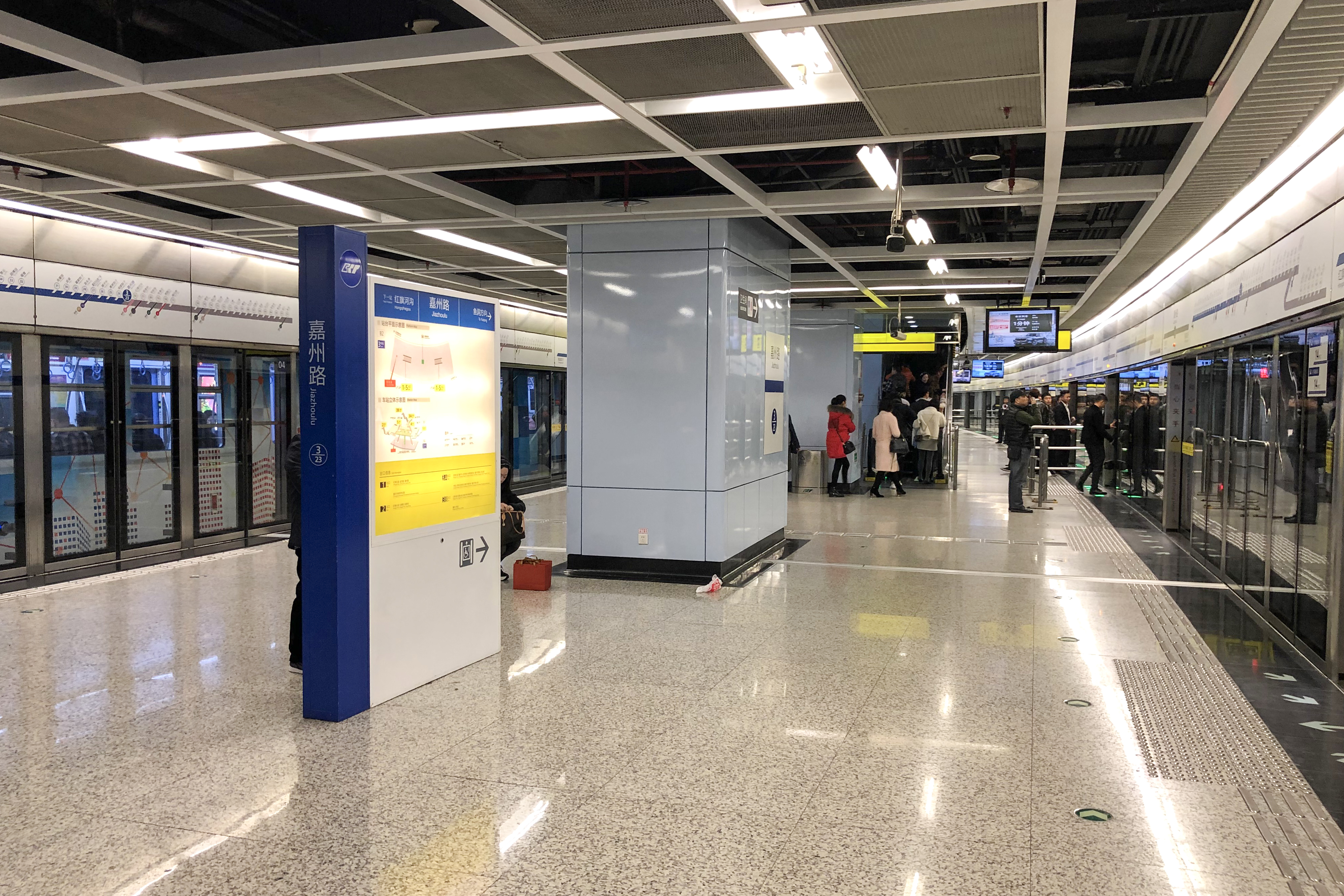
- Line 3 platform

General information
- Location: Hongmian Avenue (红棉大道); Longxi Subdistrict, Liangjiang New Area, Chongqing; China
- Coordinates: 29°35′54.089″N 106°31′5.664″E
- Operator: Chongqing Rail Transit Corp., Ltd
- Lines: Line 3 Line 4
- Platforms: 4 (2 island platform)

Construction
- Structure type: Underground
- Accessible: Yes

Other information
- Station code: / /

History
- Opened: 29 September 2011 (Line 3); 10 February 2026 (Line 4)

Services
Preceding station	Chongqing Rail Transit	Following station
Hongqihegou towards Yudong	Line 3	Zhengjiayuanzi towards Terminal 2 of Jiangbei Airport
Longxi towards Shimahelijiao	Line 4	Min'an Ave. towards Huangling
Location

Jiazhoulu is a station on Line 3 and Line 4 of Chongqing Rail Transit in Chongqing Municipality, China. It is located in Liangjiang New Area. The Line 3 station opened on 29 September 2011 and the Line 4 station opened on 10 February 2026.

== Station structure ==
B1; Concourse	Exits, Customer service, Vending machines, Toilets
B2; Platforms	Line 3 to Terminal 2 of Jiangbei Airport (Zhengjiayuanzi)
B2; Platforms	Island platform
B2; Platforms	Line 3 to Yudong (Hongqihegou)
B3; Platforms	Line 4 to Shimahelijiao (Longxi)
B3; Platforms	Island platform
B3; Platforms	Line 4 to Huangling (Min'an Ave)
