= Lijia Subdistrict, Chongqing =

Lijia Subdistrict 礼嘉街道
- Subdistrict
- Location in Chongqing
- Coordinates: 29°40′44″N 106°29′35″E
- Country: People's Republic of China
- Direct-Administered Municipality: Chongqing
- District: Yubei District
- Time zone: UTC+8 (China Standard)

Lijia Subdistrict (Chinese: 礼嘉街道; pinyin: Lǐjiā Jiēdào) is a subdistrict in Liangjiang New Area, Chongqing, China. As of 2020, it administers the following five residential neighborhoods:

- Fu'an Community (富安社区)
- Baima Community (白马社区)
- Jiaxing Community (嘉兴社区)
- Jiahe Community (嘉和社区)
- Jianing Community (嘉宁社区)

== See also ==
- List of township-level divisions of Chongqing
