= Fusheng, Chongqing =

Fusheng 复盛镇
- Town
- Location in Chongqing
- Coordinates: 29°38′38″N 106°47′44″E
- Country: People's Republic of China
- Direct-administered municipality: Chongqing
- District: Jiangbei District
- Time zone: UTC+8 (China Standard)

Fusheng (Chinese: 复盛; pinyin: Fùshèng) is a town under the administration of Liangjiang New Area, Chongqing, China. As of 2020, it has four residential neighborhoods and two villages under its administration:

Neighborhoods

- Miaoba Community (庙坝社区)
- Xiangyun Community (祥韵社区)
- Fusheng Road Community (福生路社区)
- Shihexi Community (石河溪社区)

Villages

- Shimiao Village (石庙村)
- Huashan Village (华山村)

== Transport ==
The town is served by Fusheng railway station. It will be served by the Phase 2 of Line 4.

== See also ==
- List of township-level divisions of Chongqing
