= Dalongshan station =

Metro station in Chongqing, China

Dalongshan 大龙山
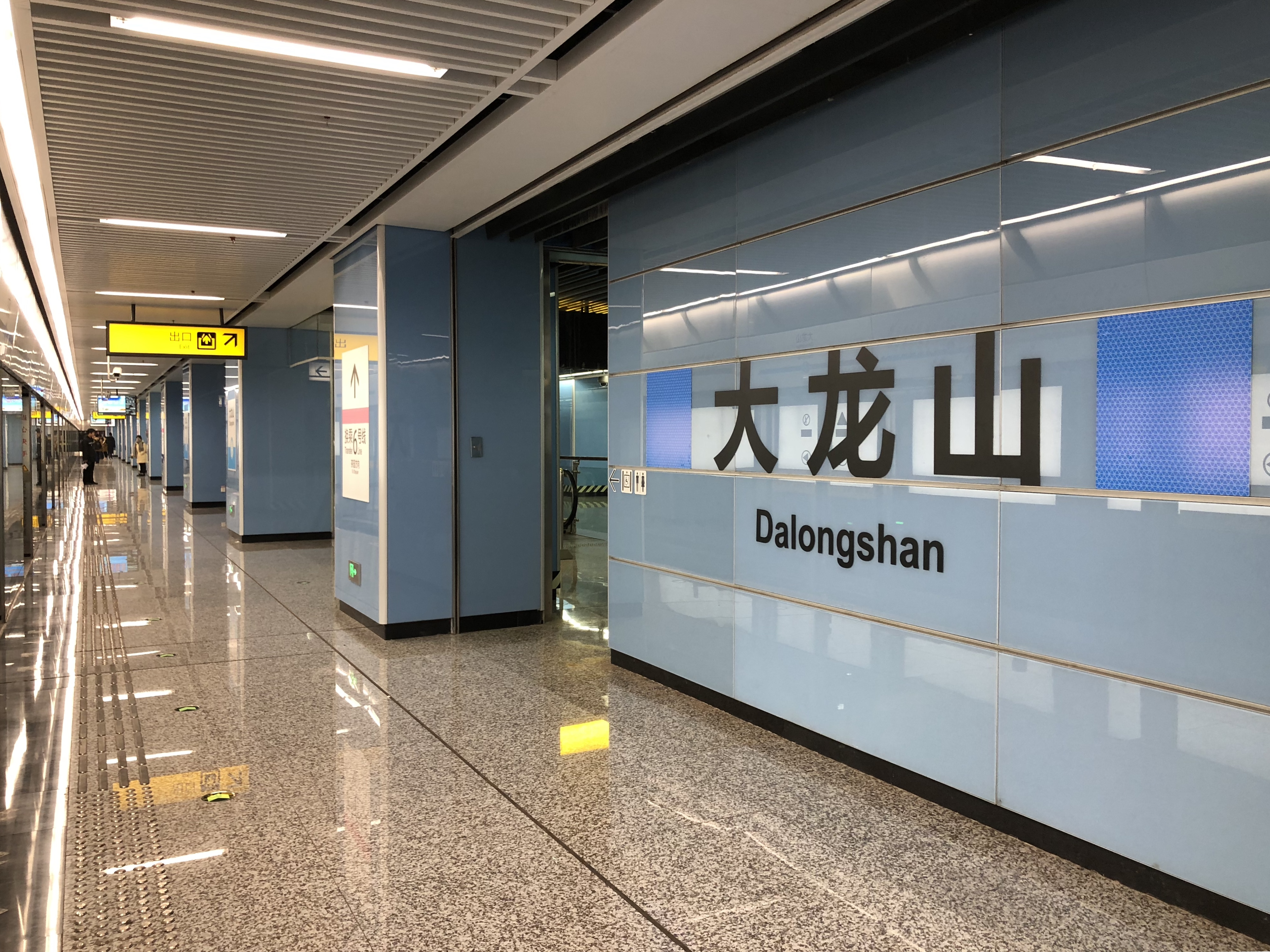

General information
- Location: Chongqing; China
- Coordinates: 29.59255°N 106.49494°E
- Operator: Chongqing Rail Transit Corp., Ltd
- Lines: Line 5 Line 6
- Platforms: 4 (2 island platforms)

Construction
- Structure type: Underground

Other information
- Station code: / /

History
- Opened: 28 August 2012; 14 years ago (Line 6); 28 December 2017; 8 years ago (Line 5)

Services
Preceding station	Chongqing Rail Transit	Following station
Ranjiaba towards Yuegangbeilu	Line 5	Dashiba towards Tiaodeng
Huahuiyuan towards Chayuan	Line 6	Ranjiaba towards Beibei
Location

Dalongshan is a station on Line 5 and Line 6 of Chongqing Rail Transit in Chongqing Municipality, China, which opened in 2012. It is located in Yubei District.

== Station structure ==
An opposite direction cross-platform interchange is provided between Line 5 and Line 6.

B2; Concourse	Exits, Customer service, Vending machines
B3; Platforms	Line 6 to Beibei (Ranjiaba)
B3; Platforms	Island platform
B3; Platforms	Line 5 to Tiaodeng (Dashiba)
B4; Platforms	Line 6 to Chayuan (Huahuiyuan)
B4; Platforms	Island platform
B4; Platforms	Line 5 to Yuegangbeilu (Ranjiaba)
