= Tangjiayuanzi station =

Metro station in Chongqing, China

Tangjiayuanzi 唐家院子
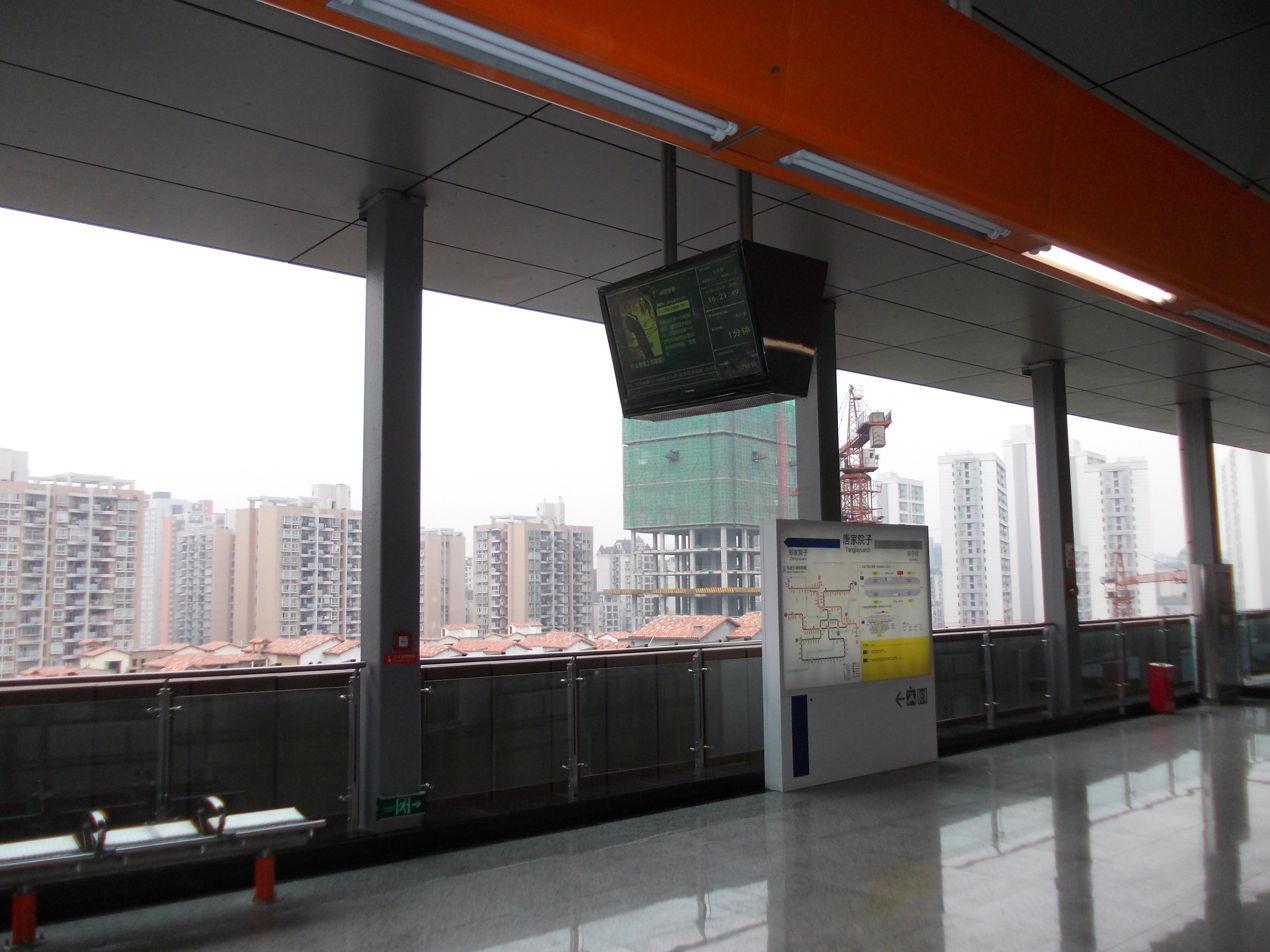
- Station platform

General information
- Location: Yubei District, Chongqing; China
- Coordinates: 29.60199°N 106.53687°E
- Operator: Chongqing Rail Transit Corp., Ltd
- Line: Line 3
- Platforms: 2 side platforms

Construction
- Structure type: Elevated

Other information
- Station code: 3/25

History
- Opened: 29 September 2011

Services
Preceding station	Chongqing Rail Transit	Following station
Zhengjiayuanzi towards Yudong	Line 3	Shiziping towards Terminal 2 of Jiangbei Airport
Location

Tangjiayuanzi is a station on Line 3 of Chongqing Rail Transit in Chongqing Municipality, China. It is located in Yubei District. It opened in 2011.

== Station structure ==
3F; Platforms	Side platform
3F; Platforms	Line 3 to Yudong (Zhengjiayuanzi)
3F; Platforms	Line 3 to Terminal 2 of Jiangbei Airport (Shiziping)
3F; Platforms	Side platform
2F; Concourse	Exits, Customer service, Vending machines, Toilets
