= Huaxinjie station =

Metro station in Chongqing, China

Huaxinjie 华新街
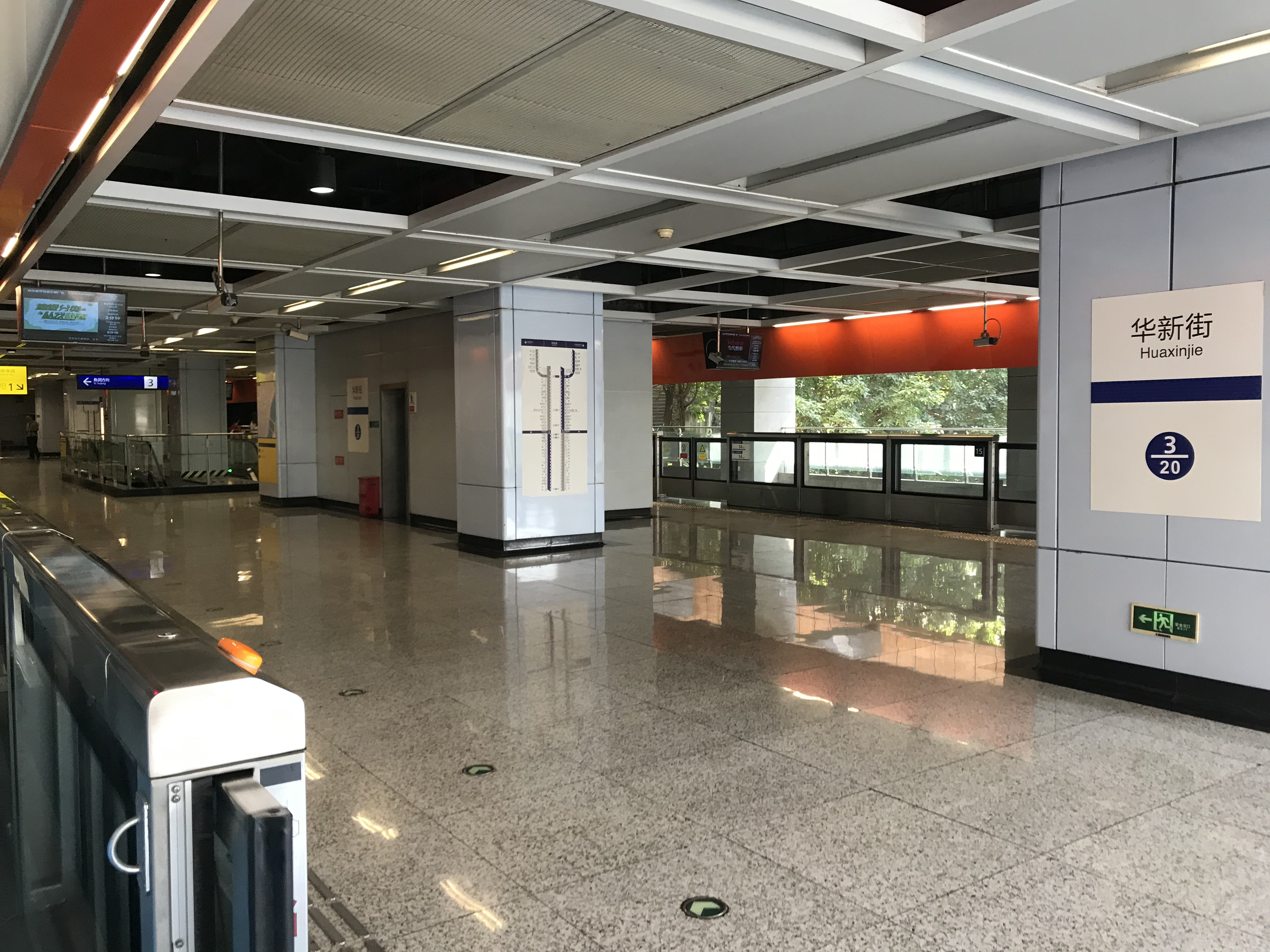

General information
- Location: Jiangbei District, Chongqing; China
- Operated by: Chongqing Rail Transit Corp., Ltd
- Line: Line 3
- Platforms: 2 (1 island platform)

Construction
- Structure type: Elevated and underground

Other information
- Station code: 3/20

History
- Opened: 29 September 2011

Services
Preceding station	Chongqing Rail Transit	Following station
Niujiaotuo towards Yudong	Line 3	Guanyinqiao towards Terminal 2 of Jiangbei Airport
Location

Huaxinjie is a station on Line 3 of Chongqing Rail Transit in Chongqing Municipality, China. It is located in Jiangbei District. It opened in 2011.

== Station structure ==
3F; Concourse	Exit 2, Customer service, Vending machines
2F; Platforms	Line 3 to Terminal 2 of Jiangbei Airport (Guanyinqiao)
2F; Platforms	Island platform
2F; Platforms	Line 3 to Yudong (Niujiaotuo)
1F; Concourse	Exit 1, Customer service, Vending machines, Toilets
