= Wansheng, Chongqing =

Coordinates: 28.9856°N 106.928°E

Wansheng District 万盛区
- District
- Wansheng District in Chongqing
- Country: People's Republic of China
- Municipality: Chongqing

Area
  - Land: 566 km^{2} (219 sq mi)

Population (2007)
  - Total: 270,000
  - Density: 480/km^{2} (1,200/sq mi)
- Time zone: UTC+8 (China Standard)

Wansheng District (simplified Chinese: 万盛区; traditional Chinese: 萬盛區; pinyin: Wànshèng Qū) is a former district of Chongqing Municipality, China.

In October 2011, Wansheng was merged into the much poorer Qijiang County to form the new Qijiang District.

Wansheng is a popular tourist destination in Chongqing, attracting tourists to natural attractions such as the Black Valley and Wansheng stone forest. The stone forest of Wansheng is the second largest in China. Before the development of tourism, Wansheng was a major coal producing area, with up to half of coal mined in Chongqing being mined in Wansheng.

== Climate ==
Climate data for Wansheng, elevation 325 m (1,066 ft), (1991–2020 normals, extremes 1981–2010)
Month	Jan	Feb	Mar	Apr	May	Jun	Jul	Aug	Sep	Oct	Nov	Dec	Year
Record high °C (°F)	21.2 (70.2)	26.6 (79.9)	35.5 (95.9)	36.9 (98.4)	39.2 (102.6)	40.4 (104.7)	41.5 (106.7)	44.3 (111.7)	44.3 (111.7)	37.3 (99.1)	30.6 (87.1)	22.9 (73.2)	44.3 (111.7)
Mean daily maximum °C (°F)	10.8 (51.4)	14.2 (57.6)	19.1 (66.4)	24.2 (75.6)	27.8 (82.0)	30.0 (86.0)	34.2 (93.6)	33.9 (93.0)	29.7 (85.5)	22.7 (72.9)	18.2 (64.8)	12.2 (54.0)	23.1 (73.6)
Daily mean °C (°F)	7.6 (45.7)	10.2 (50.4)	14.0 (57.2)	18.8 (65.8)	22.2 (72.0)	25.0 (77.0)	28.3 (82.9)	27.8 (82.0)	24.2 (75.6)	18.7 (65.7)	14.2 (57.6)	9.2 (48.6)	18.3 (65.0)
Mean daily minimum °C (°F)	5.7 (42.3)	7.8 (46.0)	10.8 (51.4)	15.2 (59.4)	18.5 (65.3)	21.5 (70.7)	24.2 (75.6)	23.6 (74.5)	20.5 (68.9)	16.1 (61.0)	11.8 (53.2)	7.3 (45.1)	15.3 (59.5)
Record low °C (°F)	−0.8 (30.6)	0.0 (32.0)	−0.7 (30.7)	5.5 (41.9)	9.6 (49.3)	15.1 (59.2)	17.1 (62.8)	18.4 (65.1)	13.8 (56.8)	6.6 (43.9)	1.8 (35.2)	−2.2 (28.0)	−2.2 (28.0)
Average precipitation mm (inches)	26.9 (1.06)	27.2 (1.07)	58.9 (2.32)	111.5 (4.39)	169.2 (6.66)	199.4 (7.85)	180.7 (7.11)	178.1 (7.01)	107.3 (4.22)	108.9 (4.29)	62.9 (2.48)	36.4 (1.43)	1,267.4 (49.89)
Average precipitation days (≥ 0.1 mm)	12.1	10.2	13.3	15.4	17.1	18.1	14.0	14.7	13.0	17.8	13.0	12.8	171.5
Average snowy days	0.5	0.1	0	0	0	0	0	0	0	0	0	0.2	0.8
Average relative humidity (%)	84	80	78	78	79	81	75	75	78	85	86	86	80
Mean monthly sunshine hours	29.2	45.5	82.4	106.3	118.6	111.2	195.1	193.4	141.4	68.4	56.5	29.8	1,177.8
Percentage possible sunshine	9	14	22	28	28	27	46	48	39	19	18	9	26
Source: China Meteorological Administration
