= Jiangbei, Chongqing =

Jiangbei 江北区
- District
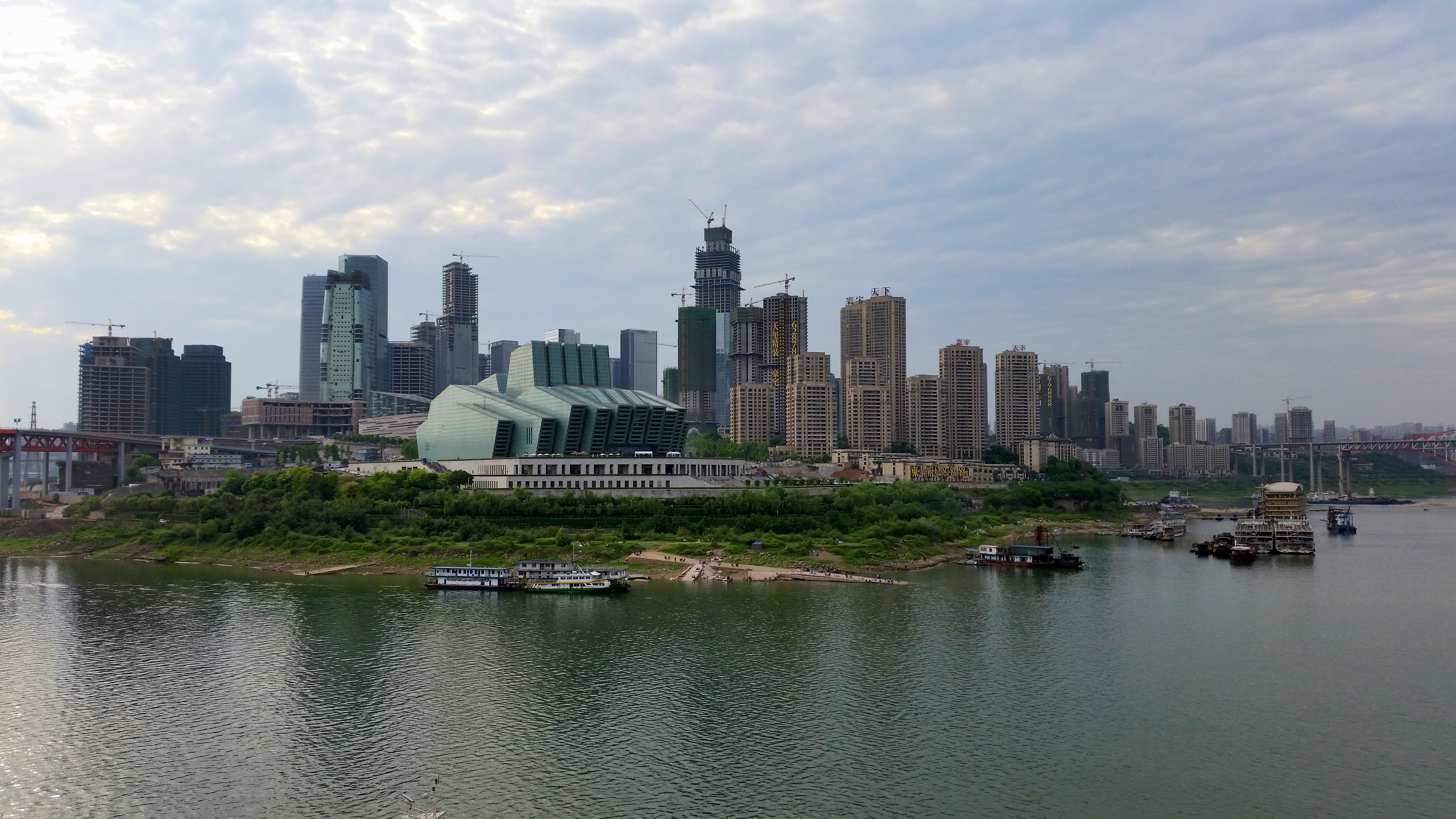

- Jiangbei District in Chongqing
- Interactive map of Jiangbei
- Coordinates: 29.6178°N 106.576°E
- Country: People's Republic of China
- Municipality: Chongqing

Area
  - District: 221.4 km^{2} (85.5 sq mi)

Population (2020 census)
  - District: 925,800
  - Density: 4,182/km^{2} (10,830/sq mi)
  - Urban: 917,946
  - Rural: 7,854
- Time zone: UTC+8 (China Standard)

Jiangbei District (Chinese: 江北区; pinyin: Jiāngběi Qū) was a former district of Chongqing municipality. Its population is about 925,000 in 2020. In October 2025, Jiangbei district was merged into Liangjiang New Area along with Yubei District and Beibei District.

== Administrative divisions ==
| Name | Chinese (S) | Hanyu Pinyin | Population (2010) | Area (km^{2}) |
|---|---|---|---|---|
| Huaxinjie Subdistrict | 华新街街道 | Huáxīnjiē Jiēdào | 91,158 | 3.07 |
| Jiangbeicheng Subdistrict | 江北城街道 | Jiāngběichéng Jiēdào | 516 | 1.66 |
| Shimahe Subdistrict | 石马河街道 | Shímǎhé Jiēdào | 103,896 | 9.55 |
| Dashiba Subdistrict | 大石坝街道 | Dàshíbà Jiēdào | 78,730 | 4.35 |
| Cuntan Subdistrict | 寸滩街道 | Cùntān Jiēdào | 42,382 | 20.3 |
| Guanyinqiao Subdistrict | 观音桥街道 | Guānyīnqiáo Jiēdào | 203,769 | 8.6 |
| Wulidian Subdistrict | 五里店街道 | Wǔlǐdiàn Jiēdào | 98,393 | |
| Guojiatuo Subdistrict | 郭家沱街道 | Guōjiātuó Jiēdào | 29,270 | 23.63 |
| Tieshanping Subdistrict | 铁山坪街道 | Tiěshānpíng Jiēdào | 42,242 | |
| Yuzui town | 鱼嘴镇 | Yúzuǐ Zhèn | 26,748 | 39.67 |
| Fusheng town | 复盛镇 | Fùshèng Zhèn | 12,127 | 30.5 |
| Wubao town | 五宝镇 | Wǔbǎo Zhèn | 8,772 | 42.8 |

== Transport ==
=== Metro ===
Jiangbei is currently served by 4 metro lines operated by Chongqing Rail Transit:

- Line 3 - Huaxinjie, Guanyinqiao
- Line 6 - Wulidian, Hongtudi, Huangnibang
- Line 9 - Liyuchi, Guanyinqiao,
- Line 10 - Liyuchi, Hongtudi
