= Qijiang, Chongqing =

District in Chongqing, China

Qijiang 綦江区 Kikiang
- District
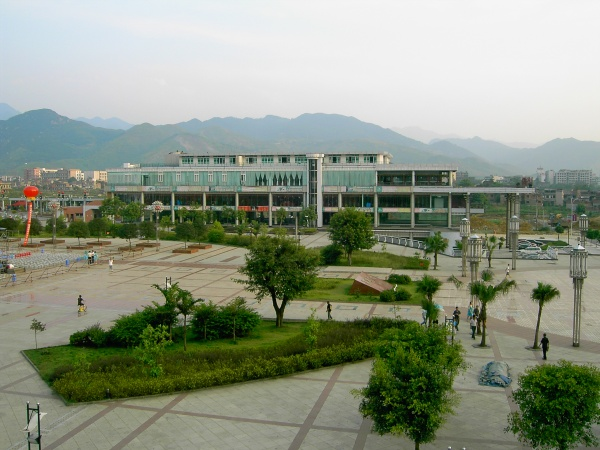

- Qijiang in Chongqing
- Coordinates: 29°01′41″N 106°39′05″E
- Country: People's Republic of China
- Municipality: Chongqing
- County seat: Gunan Subdistrict (古南街道)

Area
  - Total: 2,748 km^{2} (1,061 sq mi)

Population (2010)
  - Total: 1,213,770
  - Density: 441.7/km^{2} (1,144/sq mi)
- Time zone: UTC+8 (China Standard)
- Postal code: 401400
- Area code: 023
- Website: www.cqqj.gov.cn

Qijiang District (Chinese: 綦江区; pinyin: Qíjiāng Qū) is a district of Chongqing, China, bordering Guizhou province to the south. The district has an area of 2,748 km^{2} and a population of 1,213,770 (de facto resident population 825,500 as of 2017).

In October 2011, Qijiang County and Wansheng District were merged to form the new Qijiang District.

== Administrative divisions ==
Name	Chinese (S)	Hanyu Pinyin	Population (2010)	Area (km^{2})
Gunan Subdistrict	古南街道	Gǔnán Jiēdào	86,952	218
Wenlong Subdistrict	文龙街道	Wénlóng Jiēdào	121,058	122.45
Sanjiang Subdistrict	三江街道	Sānjiāng Jiēdào	39,785	103.7
Wansheng Subdistrict	万盛街道	Wànshèng Jiēdào	42,419	2.43
Donglin Subdistrict	东林街道	Dōnglín Jiēdào	31,318	
Wandong town	万东镇	Wàndōng Zhèn	40,014	59.9
Nantong town	南桐镇	Nántóng Zhèn	46,684	64.42
Qingnian town	青年镇	Qīngnián Zhèn	22,162	55.26
Guanba town	关坝镇	Guānbà Zhèn	23,898	71.43
Conglin town	丛林镇	Cónglín Zhèn	17,053	59.9
Shilin town	石林镇	Shílín Zhèn	9,404	94.28
Jinqiao town	金桥镇	Jīnqiáo Zhèn	14,212	64.87
Heishan town	黑山镇	Hēishān Zhèn	8,612	98.65
Shijiao town	石角镇	Shíjiǎo Zhèn	46,097	157
Dongxi town	东溪镇	Dōngxī Zhèn	58,169	157
Ganshui town	赶水镇	Gǎnshuǐ Zhèn	65,994	193
Datong town	打通镇	Dǎtōng Zhèn	51,025	125
Shihao town	石壕镇	Shíháo Zhèn	43,680	129.39
Yongxin town	永新镇	Yǒngxīn Zhèn	49,951	231
Sanjiao town	三角镇	Sānjiǎo Zhèn	35,486	106
Longsheng town	隆盛镇	Lóngshèng Zhèn	30,661	130
Guofu town	郭扶镇	Guōfú Zhèn	32,831	174
Zhuantang town	篆塘镇	Zhuàntáng Zhèn	21,048	80
Dingshan town	丁山镇	Dīngshān Zhèn	8,396	33
Anwen town	安稳镇	Ānwěn Zhèn	30,553	102
Fuhuan town	扶欢镇	Fúhuān Zhèn	25,164	64
Yongcheng town	永城镇	Yǒngchéng Zhèn	17,634	53
Xinsheng town	新盛镇	Xīnshèng Zhèn	13,872	76.8
Zhongfeng town	中峰镇	Zhōngfēng Zhèn	11,622	80
Hengshan town	横山镇	Héngshān Zhèn	11,063	43

== Climate ==
Climate data for Qijiang, elevation 475 m (1,558 ft), (1991–2020 normals, extremes 1981–present)
Month	Jan	Feb	Mar	Apr	May	Jun	Jul	Aug	Sep	Oct	Nov	Dec	Year
Record high °C (°F)	19.7 (67.5)	25.6 (78.1)	35.3 (95.5)	36.9 (98.4)	39.2 (102.6)	39.6 (103.3)	41.2 (106.2)	44.5 (112.1)	44.5 (112.1)	37.6 (99.7)	31.5 (88.7)	22.0 (71.6)	44.5 (112.1)
Mean daily maximum °C (°F)	9.8 (49.6)	12.7 (54.9)	18.5 (65.3)	23.7 (74.7)	26.4 (79.5)	28.6 (83.5)	33.2 (91.8)	33.8 (92.8)	26.6 (79.9)	21.1 (70.0)	16.1 (61.0)	10.6 (51.1)	21.8 (71.2)
Daily mean °C (°F)	7.0 (44.6)	9.1 (48.4)	14.1 (57.4)	18.6 (65.5)	21.3 (70.3)	24.1 (75.4)	27.8 (82.0)	27.8 (82.0)	22.5 (72.5)	17.8 (64.0)	13.2 (55.8)	8.0 (46.4)	17.6 (63.7)
Mean daily minimum °C (°F)	5.3 (41.5)	6.8 (44.2)	11.0 (51.8)	15.2 (59.4)	17.9 (64.2)	21.2 (70.2)	24.1 (75.4)	23.9 (75.0)	20.0 (68.0)	15.7 (60.3)	11.3 (52.3)	6.3 (43.3)	14.9 (58.8)
Record low °C (°F)	−0.3 (31.5)	0.8 (33.4)	0.8 (33.4)	6.8 (44.2)	10.4 (50.7)	15.7 (60.3)	19.1 (66.4)	18.9 (66.0)	14.4 (57.9)	6.6 (43.9)	3.3 (37.9)	−1.0 (30.2)	−1.0 (30.2)
Average precipitation mm (inches)	22.0 (0.87)	17.8 (0.70)	67.4 (2.65)	105.5 (4.15)	162.2 (6.39)	210.8 (8.30)	138.4 (5.45)	114.6 (4.51)	157.6 (6.20)	90.2 (3.55)	47.5 (1.87)	25.3 (1.00)	1,159.3 (45.64)
Average precipitation days (≥ 0.1 mm)	11.7	8.7	12.2	15.5	17.2	16.2	11.3	12.3	16.2	17.7	14.1	12.9	166
Average snowy days	0.3	0.1	0	0	0	0	0	0	0	0	0	0.3	0.7
Average relative humidity (%)	81	76	73	76	78	81	71	69	82	87	87	85	79
Mean monthly sunshine hours	24.9	35.6	78.1	108.1	111.7	98.3	183.3	207.0	81.8	53.4	36.6	28.9	1,047.7
Percentage possible sunshine	8	11	21	28	26	24	43	51	22	15	12	9	23
Source: China Meteorological Administration All-time Oct extreme

== Transportation ==
- China National Highway 210
- Sichuan–Guizhou Railway

== Geology ==
The geology is notable for its fossils including ornithopod-dominated tracksite from the Lower Cretaceous Jiaguan Formation (Barremian–Albian).
