= Yubei, Chongqing =

Yubei 渝北区
- District
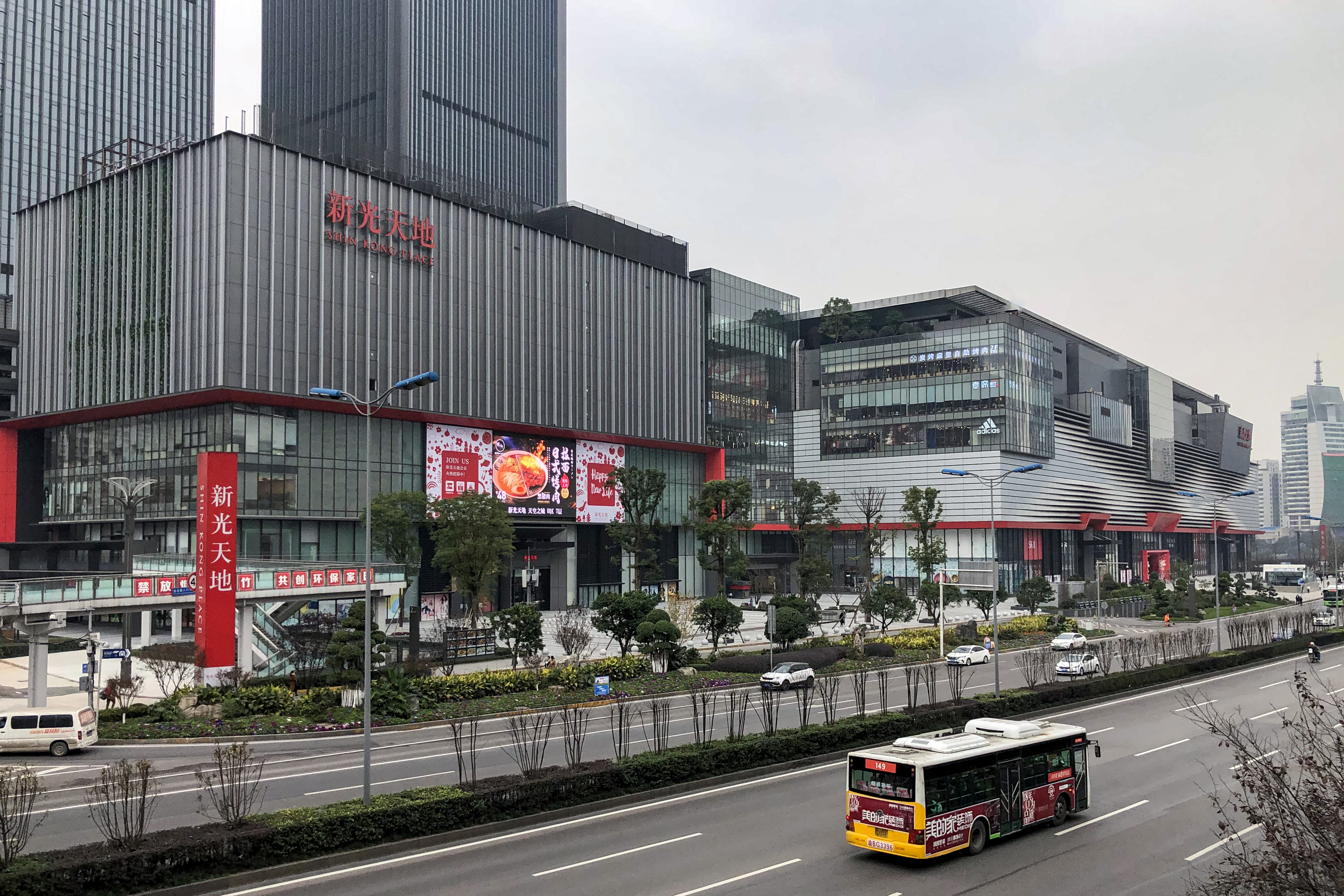
- Shin Kong Place Chongqing

- Yubei District in Chongqing
- Coordinates: 29.7769°N 106.624°E
- Country: People's Republic of China
- Municipality: Chongqing

Area
  - Total: 1,457 km^{2} (563 sq mi)

Population (2020 census)
  - Total: 2,191,493
  - Density: 1,504/km^{2} (3,896/sq mi)
- Time zone: UTC+8 (China Standard)

Yubei District (Chinese: 渝北区; pinyin: Yúběi Qū; lit. 'the north of Yu', with Yu being an abbreviation for Chongqing) was a district of Chongqing municipality, bordering Sichuan province to the north. Lianglu, which is a town administered by Yubei District, is where the Chongqing Jiangbei International Airport is located. It is now a part of Liangjiang New Area.

== Administrative divisions ==
Name	Chinese (S)	Hanyu Pinyin	Population (2010)	Area (km^{2})
Shuanglonghu Subdistrict	双龙湖街道	Shuānglónghú Jiēdào	128,563	22.5
Xiantao Subdistrict	仙桃街道	Xiāntáo Jiēdào	128,563	23
Huixing Subdistrict	回兴街道	Huíxìng Jiēdào	186,972	28
Yuanyang Subdistrict	鸳鸯街道	Yuānyāng Jiēdào	37,009	36.03
Kangmei Subdistrict	康美街道	Kāngměi Jiēdào	37,009	13.97
Cuiyun Subdistrict	翠云街道	Cuìyún Jiēdào	18,636	19.1
Renhe Subdistrict	人和街道	Rénhé Jiēdào	61,609	15.7
Tiangongdian Subdistrict	天宫殿街道	Tiāngōngdiàn Jiēdào	55,848	11.275
Longxi Subdistrict	龙溪街道	Lóngxī Jiēdào	140,932	18.6
Longshan Subdistrict	龙山街道	Lóngshān Jiēdào	117,700	6.4
Longta Subdistrict	龙塔街道	Lóngtǎ Jiēdào	94,122	6.6
Dazhulin Subdistrict	大竹林街道	Dàzhúlín Jiēdào	36,925	21.3
Lianglu Subdistrict	两路街道	Liǎnglù Jiēdào	60,466	95.2
Yuelai Subdistrict	悦来街道	Yuèlái Jiēdào	10,654	22
Shuangfengqiao Subdistrict	双凤桥街道	Shuāngfèngqiáo Jiēdào	67,717	95.2
Wangjia Subdistrict	王家街道	Wángjiā Jiēdào	15,451	95.2
Lijia Subdistrict	礼嘉街道	Lǐjiā Jiēdào	15,923	35.18
Yufengshan town	玉峰山镇	Yùfēngshān Zhèn	23,917	23.59
Longxing town	龙兴镇	Lóngxìng Zhèn	36,297	
Tongjing town	统景镇	Tǒngjǐng Zhèn	30,673	112.3
Dawan town	大湾镇	Dàwān Zhèn	22,484	60.2
Xinglong town	兴隆镇	Xīnglóng Zhèn	20,333	93.5
Mu'er town	木耳镇	Mù'ěr Zhèn	23,157	83.5
Cizhu town	茨竹镇	Cízhú Zhèn	22,996	60.25
Gulu town	古路镇	Gǔlù Zhèn	18,669	47.5
Shichuan town	石船镇	Shíchuán Zhèn	39,645	129.7
Dasheng town	大盛镇	Dàshèng Zhèn	21,850	50.5
Luoqi town	洛碛镇	Luòqì Zhèn	36,862	57.4

== Climate ==
Climate data for Yubei District, elevation 465 m (1,526 ft), (1991–2020 normals, extremes 1981–present)
Month	Jan	Feb	Mar	Apr	May	Jun	Jul	Aug	Sep	Oct	Nov	Dec	Year
Record high °C (°F)	16.8 (62.2)	23.7 (74.7)	33.7 (92.7)	34.1 (93.4)	36.1 (97.0)	35.6 (96.1)	38.7 (101.7)	41.7 (107.1)	40.9 (105.6)	33.1 (91.6)	27.7 (81.9)	17.9 (64.2)	41.7 (107.1)
Mean daily maximum °C (°F)	8.9 (48.0)	12.0 (53.6)	16.9 (62.4)	22.2 (72.0)	25.6 (78.1)	28.0 (82.4)	32.0 (89.6)	32.3 (90.1)	27.0 (80.6)	20.6 (69.1)	16.0 (60.8)	10.2 (50.4)	21.0 (69.8)
Daily mean °C (°F)	6.7 (44.1)	9.0 (48.2)	13.2 (55.8)	18.0 (64.4)	21.4 (70.5)	24.1 (75.4)	27.6 (81.7)	27.6 (81.7)	23.1 (73.6)	17.7 (63.9)	13.2 (55.8)	8.0 (46.4)	17.5 (63.5)
Mean daily minimum °C (°F)	5.1 (41.2)	7.1 (44.8)	10.6 (51.1)	15.0 (59.0)	18.4 (65.1)	21.3 (70.3)	24.2 (75.6)	24.1 (75.4)	20.4 (68.7)	15.7 (60.3)	11.4 (52.5)	6.5 (43.7)	15.0 (59.0)
Record low °C (°F)	−7.4 (18.7)	0.2 (32.4)	0.0 (32.0)	4.9 (40.8)	9.6 (49.3)	14.0 (57.2)	18.2 (64.8)	17.4 (63.3)	13.2 (55.8)	6.2 (43.2)	2.6 (36.7)	−2.8 (27.0)	−7.4 (18.7)
Average precipitation mm (inches)	19.6 (0.77)	22.6 (0.89)	55.2 (2.17)	101.2 (3.98)	154.8 (6.09)	205.6 (8.09)	167.4 (6.59)	130.9 (5.15)	129.3 (5.09)	104.8 (4.13)	52.4 (2.06)	24.4 (0.96)	1,168.2 (45.97)
Average precipitation days (≥ 0.1 mm)	9.9	9.4	12.0	14.1	16.5	16.2	12.3	10.9	13.0	16.7	11.9	11.2	154.1
Average snowy days	1.0	0.4	0	0	0	0	0	0	0	0	0	0.2	1.6
Average relative humidity (%)	83	79	75	76	82	75	72	79	85	84	85	79	80
Mean monthly sunshine hours	35.9	45.5	85.8	116.9	126.0	112.0	195.8	208.4	127.7	70.4	59.4	34.9	1,218.7
Percentage possible sunshine	11	14	23	30	30	27	46	51	35	20	19	11	26
Source: China Meteorological Administration

== Government and infrastructure ==
The Chongqing Municipal Administration of Prisons is headquartered in Yubei District.

== Economy ==
The restaurant chain Country Style Cooking is headquartered in Yubei District.

China Express Airlines has its headquarters on the grounds of Chongqing International Airport.

== Transportation ==
- China National Highway 210

=== Metro ===
Yubei is currently served by 3 metro lines operated by Chongqing Rail Transit:

- Line 3 - Hongqihegou, Jiazhoulu, Zhengjiayuanzi, Tangjiayuanzi, Shiziping, Chongqingbei Railway, Longtousi, Tongjiayuanzi, Jinyu, Jintonglu, Yuanyang, The EXPO Garden, Cuiyun, Changfulu, Huixing, Shuanglong, Bijin, Jiangbei Airport, Jurenba
- Line 6 - Hongqihegou, Huahuiyuan, Dalongshan, Guangdianyuan, Dazhulin, Kangzhuang, Lijia, Jinshansi
- Line 10 - Central Park West, Central Park, Central Park East, Lushan, Yubei Square, Terminal 2 of Jiangbei Airport, Terminal 3 of Jiangbei Airport
