= Liangjiang New Area =

Municipal district of Chongqing, China

Liangjiang 两江新区
- District & State-level new area
- Liangjiang New Area
- Jiangbeizui CBD (江北嘴金融中心)

- Liangjiang New Area in Chongqing
- Coordinates (Government of Liangjiang New Area): 29°38′33″N 106°34′01″E
- Country: People's Republic of China
- Municipality: Chongqing
- District Gov't Established: 6 November 2025

Government
  - CPC Secretary: Xu Jian (徐建)
  - Head of Government Preparatory Group: Yang Xiaoyun (杨晓云)

Area
  - Total: 1,360 km^{2} (530 sq mi)

Population
  - Total: approx. 3,520,000
  - Density: 2,588/km^{2} (6,700/sq mi)
- Time zone: UTC+8 (China Standard)
- Website: ljxq.cq.gov.cn

Liangjiang New Area (Chinese: 两江新区; pinyin: Liǎngjiāng Xīn Qū) is a municipal district of the city of Chongqing, China. The district covers 1,360 square kilometres combining parts of former Jiangbei District, Yubei District, and Beibei District.

== Overview ==
After Shanghai's Pudong New Area and Tianjin's Binhai New Area, China's only inland and third sub-provincial new area – Chongqing's Liangjiang New Area – was set up with the approval of the State Council on June 18, 2010, the 13th anniversary since Chongqing became China's fourth municipality. Liangjiang New Area, located in the main urban districts of Chongqing, north of the Yangtze River and east of the Jialing River, covers 1,200 square kilometers, of which 550 square kilometers is available for construction and composed of Jiangbei, Yubei and Beibei administrative district, the North New Zone and China's first inland bonded zone, Lianglu Cuntan Bonded Port Area. Chongqing Liangjiang New Area Development & Investment Group Co., Ltd. is in charge of constructing the industrial parks.

In October 2025, the State Council approved a boundary adjustment within Chongqing which merged Jiangbei District and parts of Yubei and Beibei districts to form the new Liangjiang District, which corresponded with the boundaries of the Liangjiang New Area.

== Administrative divisions ==
Liangjiang New Area has 31 subdistricts and 11 towns.

Subdistricts

- Jinshan Subdistrict (金山街道) (District seat)
- Yuanyang Subdistrict (鸳鸯街道)
- Renhe Subdistrict (人和街道)
- Tiangongdian Subdistrict (天宫殿街道)
- Cuiyun Subdistrict (翠云街道)
- Dazhulin Subdistrict (大竹林街道)
- Lijia Subdistrict (礼嘉街道)
- Kangmei Subdistrict (康美街道)
- Shuitu Subdistrict (水土街道)
- Fuxing Subdistrict (复兴街道)
- Caijiagang Subdistrict (蔡家岗街道)
- Huaxinjie Subdistrict (华新街街道)
- Wulidian Subdistrict (五里店街道)
- Dashiba Subdistrict (大石坝街道)
- Shimahe Subdistrict (石马河街道)
- Jiangbeicheng Subdistrict (江北城街道)
- Cuntan Subdistrict (寸滩街道)
- Guanyinqiao Subdistrict (观音桥街道)
- Guojiatuo Subdistrict (郭家沱街道)
- Tieshanping Subdistrict (铁山坪街道)
- Huixing Subdistrict (回兴街道)
- Baoshenghu Subdistrict (宝圣湖街道)
- Xiantao Subdistrict (仙桃街道)
- Shuanglonghu Subdistrict (双龙湖街道)
- Longxi Subdistrict (龙溪街道)
- Longshan Subdistrict (龙山街道)
- Longta Subdistrict (龙塔街道)
- Wangjia Subdistrict (王家街道)
- Yuelai Subdistrict (悦来街道)
- Lianglu Subdistrict (两路街道)
- Shuangfengqiao Subdistrict (双凤桥街道)

Towns

- Shijialiang Town (施家梁镇)
- Tongjiaxi Town (童家溪镇)
- Yuzui Town (鱼嘴镇)
- Fusheng Town (复盛镇)
- Wubao Town (五宝镇)
- Gulu Town (古路镇)
- Shichuan Town (石船镇)
- Mu'er Town (木耳镇)
- Luoqi Town (洛碛镇)
- Longxing Town (龙兴镇)
- Yufengshan Town (玉峰山镇)

== Transportation ==
Chongqing Jiangbei International Airport is located in the district.
