= Red Rock Village Museum =

Museum and historic site in Chongqing, China

Coordinates: 29°33′14″N 106°29′57″E

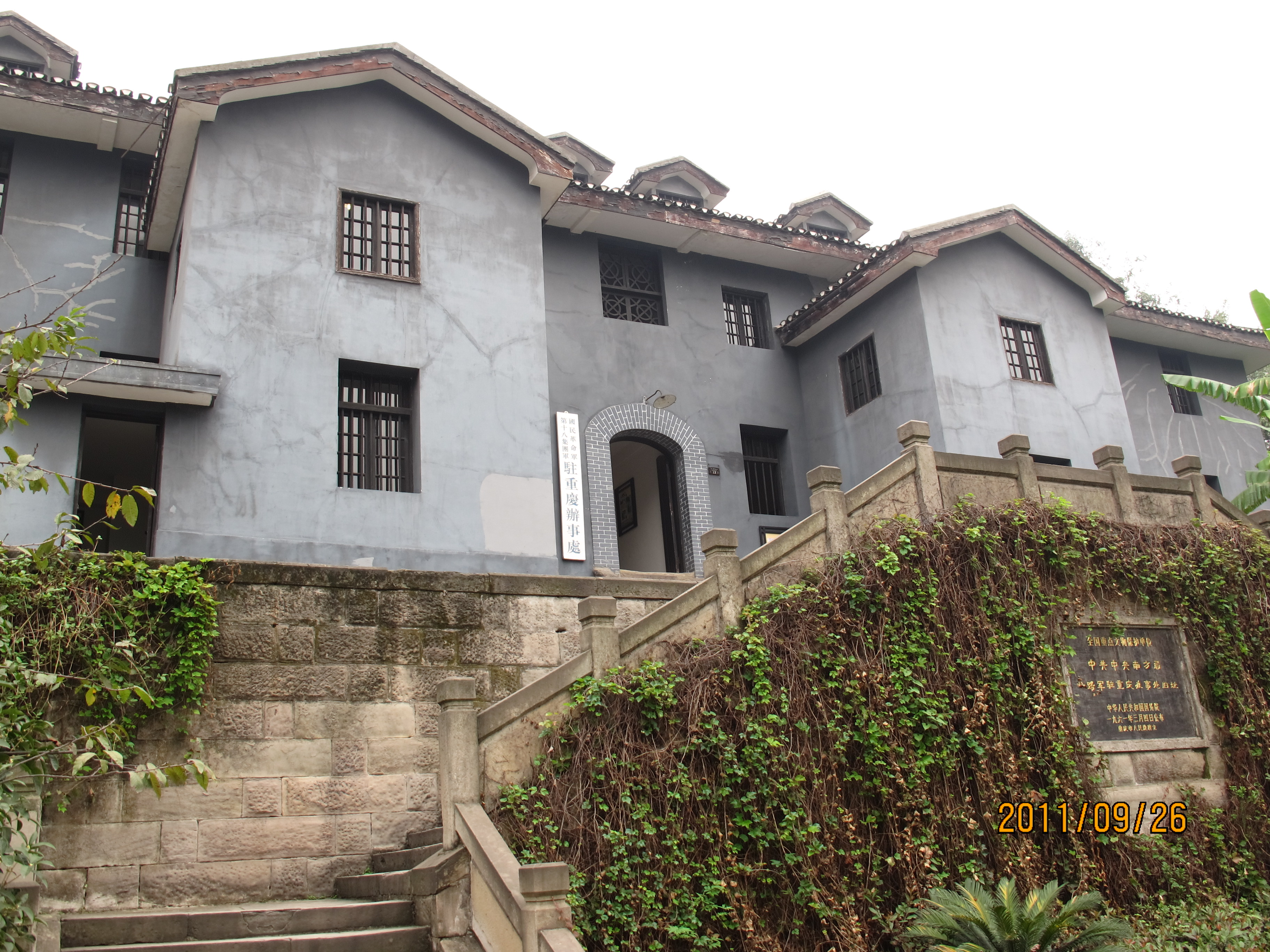
The Former Eighth Route Army Office in Hongyancun, now part of the Hongyancun Museum

Red Rock Village Museum or Hongyancun Museum (Chinese: 红岩村; pinyin: Hóngyáncūn) is a museum in Yuzhong District, Chongqing, China. It was a diplomatic site for the Chinese Communist Party, led by Zhou Enlai during World War II.

The museum is the site where Mao Zedong signed the Double Tenth Agreement for peace between the Communist Party and the rival Kuomintang on 10 October 1945.

== Transportation ==
The museum is served by Hongyancun station and Fuhualu station on Line 9 of Chongqing Rail Transit.

== See also ==
- Double Tenth Agreement
