= Tuwan station =

Chongqing Rail Transit station

Tuwan 土湾
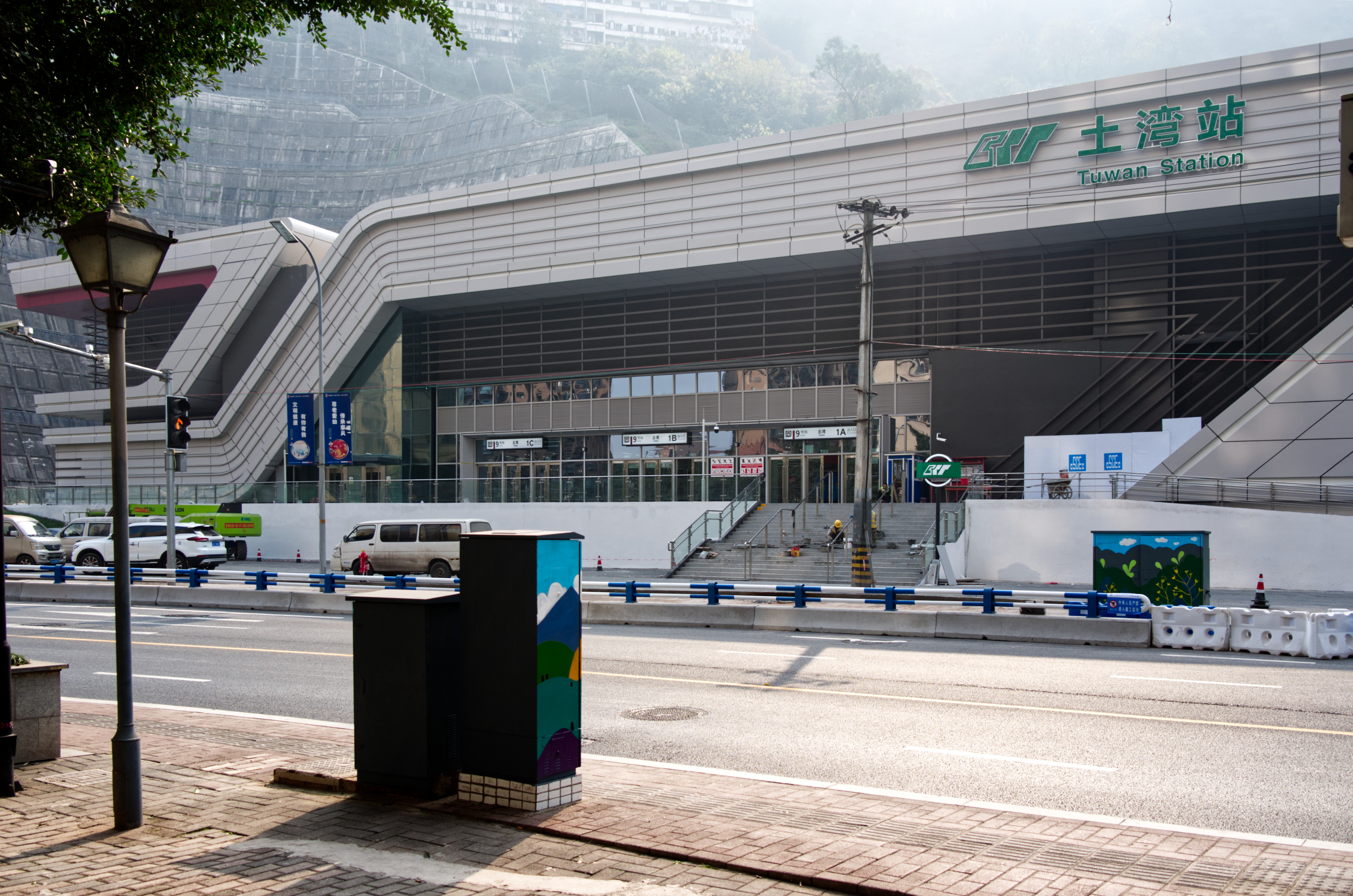
- Station exterior

General information
- Location: Chongqing; China
- Coordinates: 29.5539°N 106.4767°E
- Operated by: Chongqing Rail Transit Corp., Ltd
- Line: Line 9
- Platforms: 2 side platforms

Construction
- Structure type: At-grade and underground

Other information
- Station code: /

History
- Opened: 25 January 2022

Services
Preceding station	Chongqing Rail Transit	Following station
Xiaolongkan towards Gaotanyan	Line 9	Hongyancun towards Huashigou
Location

Tuwan Station is a station on Line 9 of Chongqing Rail Transit in Chongqing municipality, China, which opened in 2022. It is located in Shapingba District.
