= Hualongqiao station =

Metro station in Chongqing, China

Hualongqiao 化龙桥
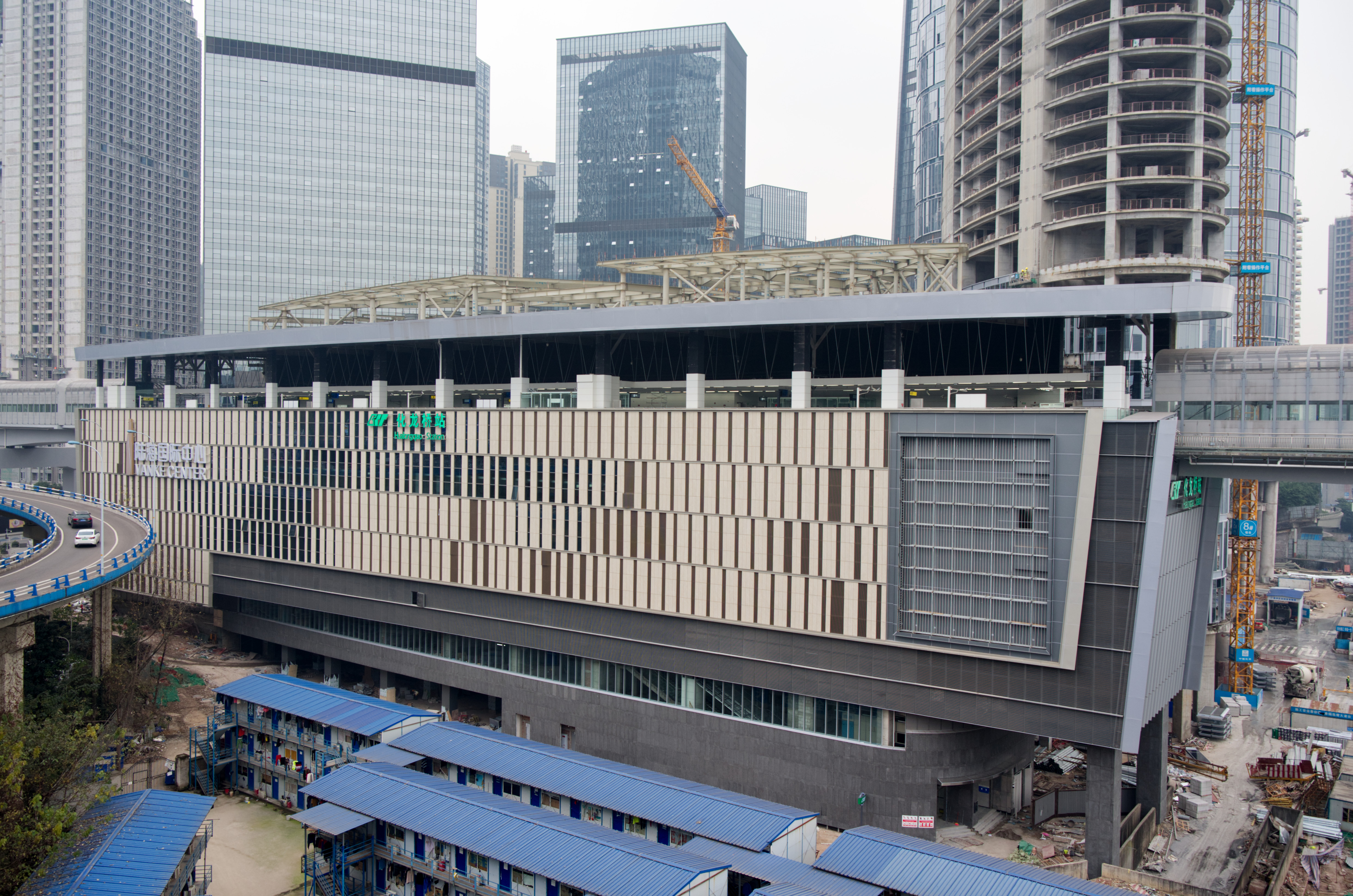
- Exterior of Hualongqiao station

General information
- Location: Chongqing; China
- Coordinates: 29.5527°N 106.5149°E
- Operated by: Chongqing Rail Transit Corp., Ltd
- Line: Line 9
- Platforms: 2 side platforms

Construction
- Structure type: Elevated

Other information
- Station code: /

History
- Opened: 25 January 2022

Services
Preceding station	Chongqing Rail Transit	Following station
Fuhualu towards Gaotanyan	Line 9	Lijiaping towards Huashigou
Location

Hualongqiao station (Chinese: 化龙桥站; pinyin: Huàlóngqiáo zhàn), formerly known as Huacun station during planning, is a station on Line 9 of Chongqing Rail Transit in Chongqing municipality, China, which opened in 2022. It is located in Yuzhong District, close to several skyscrapers at the south end of Jiahua Bridge. The station is the highest station in the world regarding height from the ground level, surpassing the height of Smith–Ninth Streets station in New York. The station is a 6 story tall structure with Line 9 trains stopping 48 meters above the surface. The station will have connections to the adjacent supertall Chongqing International Trade and Commerce Center.
