= Xingke Avenue station =

Metro station in Chongqing, China

Xingke Ave. 兴科大道
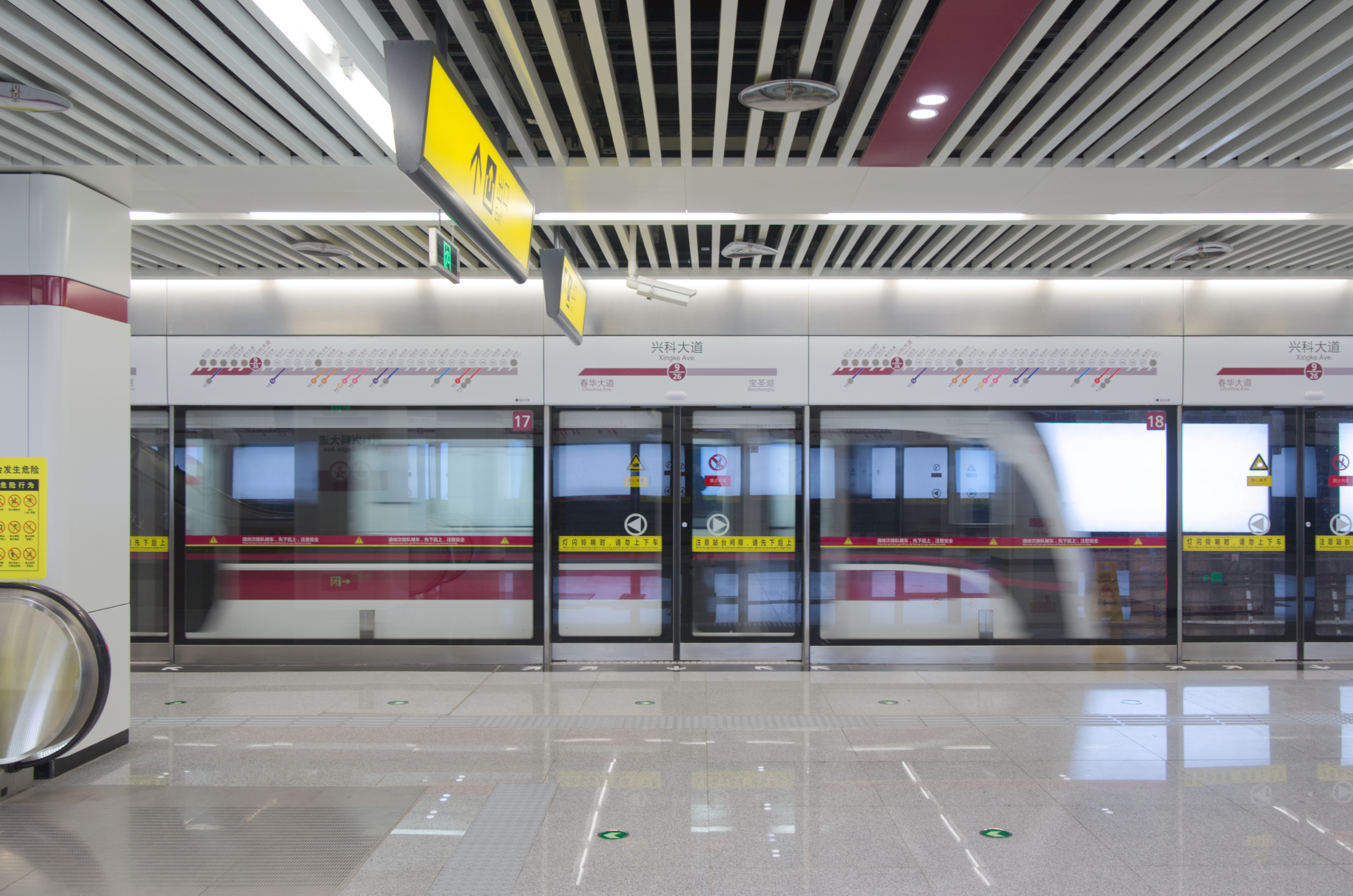
- Platform

Chinese name
- Simplified Chinese: 兴科大道站
- Traditional Chinese: 興科大道站
Transcriptions
Standard Mandarin
- Hanyu Pinyin: Xīngkē Dàdào Zhàn

General information
- Location: Baotong Road (宝桐路) × Xingke Avenue; Liangjiang New Area, Chongqing; China
- Coordinates: 29°41′26″N 106°36′00″E
- System: Chongqing Rail Transit
- Operator: Chongqing Rail Transit Operation Co., Ltd.
- Line: Line 9
- Platforms: 2 (1 island platform)
- Tracks: 2

Construction
- Structure type: Underground
- Accessible: Yes

Other information
- Station code: /

History
- Opened: 25 January 2022

Services
Preceding station	Chongqing Rail Transit	Following station
Baoshenghu towards Gaotanyan	Line 9	Chunhua Ave. towards Huashigou
Location

Xingke Ave. (Chinese: 兴科大道) is an underground metro station on Line 9 of Chongqing Rail Transit in Liangjiang New Area of Chongqing Municipality, China. The station was opened on 25 January 2022, together with the phase 1 of line 9 and was the northern terminus. After the phase 2 opened on 18 January 2023, it became an intermediate station.

In the planning stage, the stations was called Huixing (Chinese: 回兴), same as the station on Line 3. But it can't interchange actually, so the name was changed.

== Station structure ==
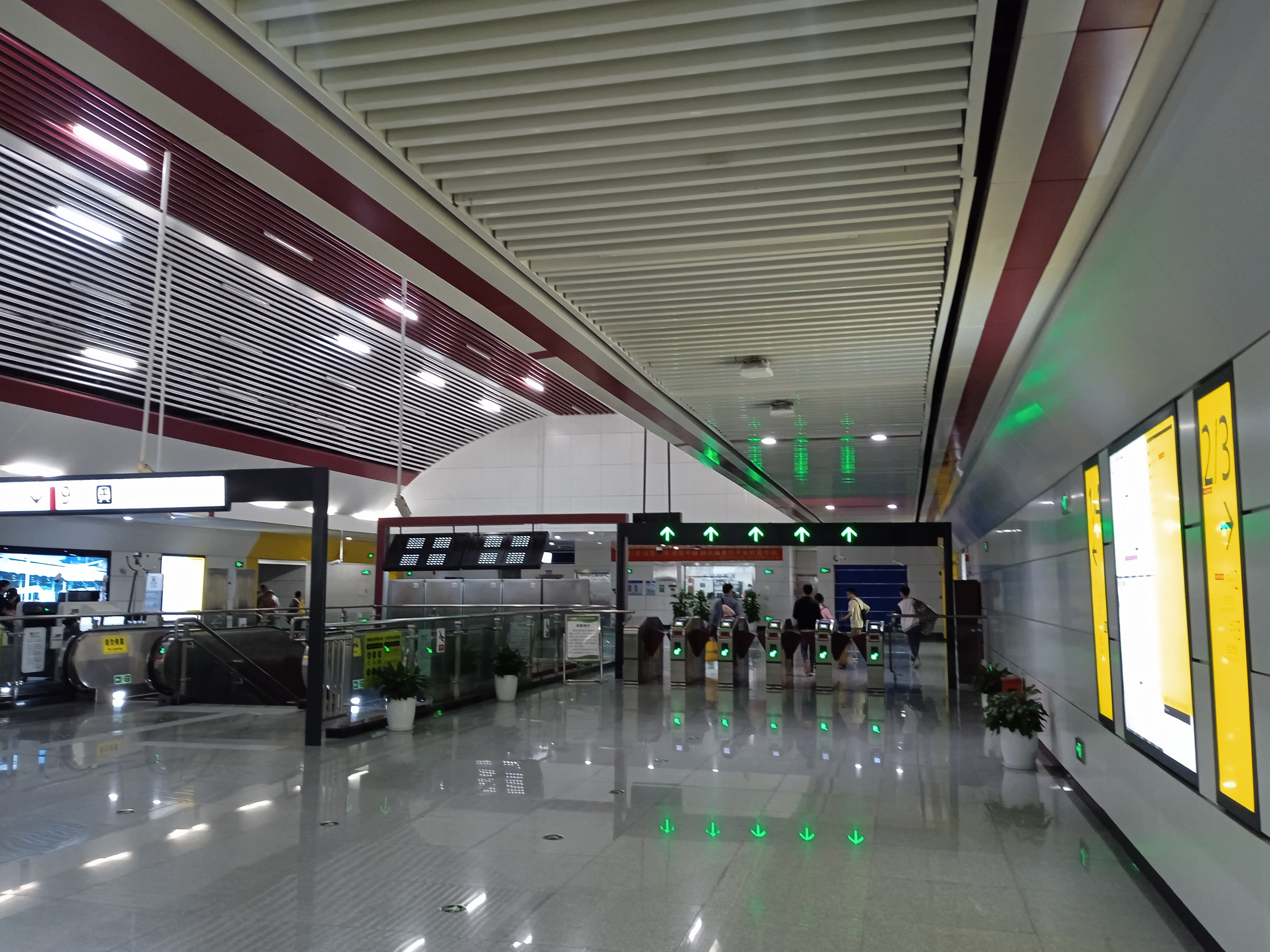
Concourse

B1	Concourse	Customer service, vending machines
B2		Line 9 to Gaotanyan (Baoshenghu)
B2	Island platform
B2		Line 9 to Gaotanyan (Chunhua Ave.)

=== Entrances/exits ===
- 1: Xingke Avenue
- 2: Not yet open
- 3: Baosheng West Road (宝圣西路)
- 4A: Xingke Avenue
- 4B: Baotong Road
- 4C: Baotong Road
