= Hongyancun station =

Chongqing Rail Transit station

Hongyancun 红岩村
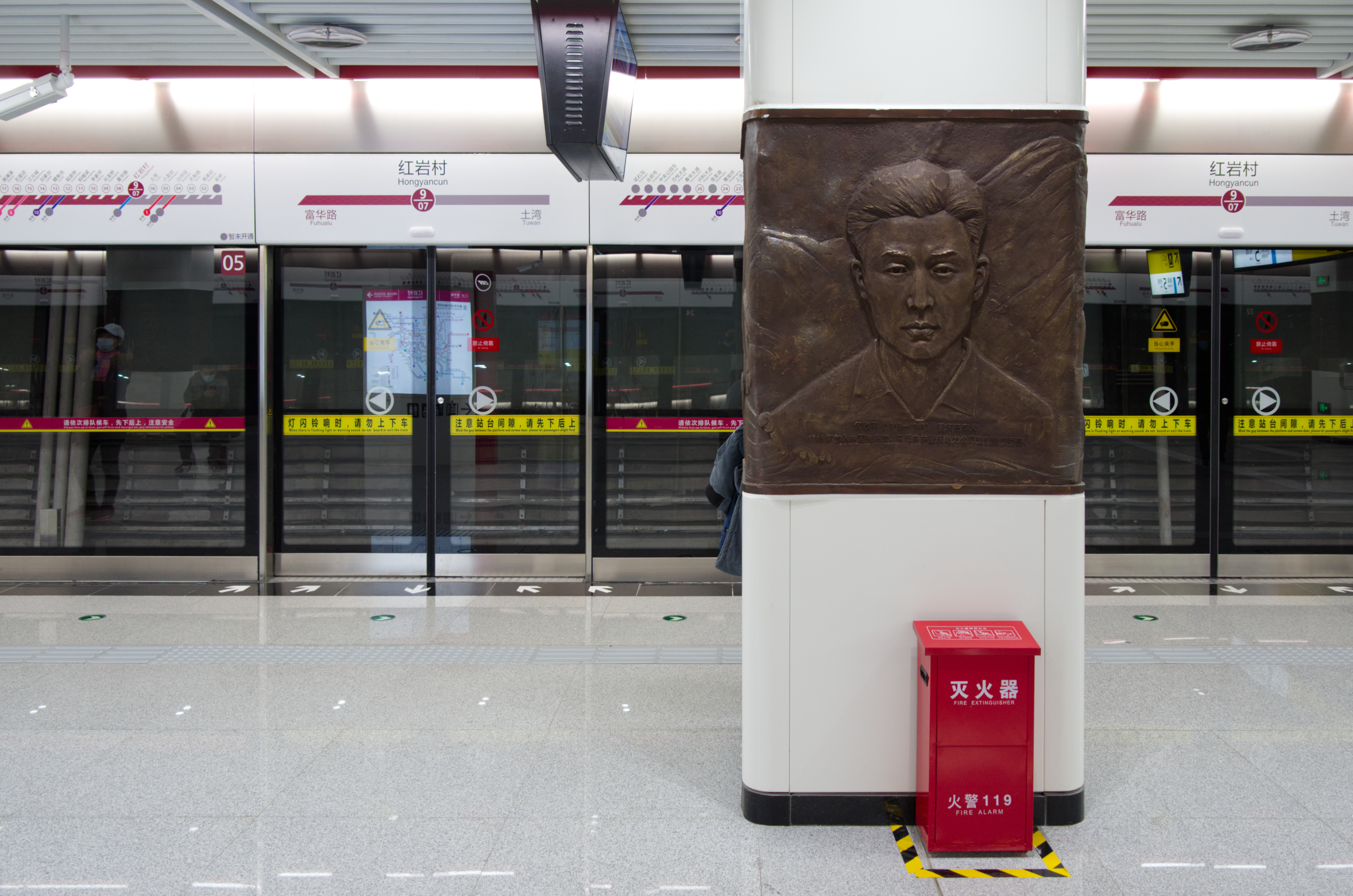

Chinese name
- Traditional Chinese: 紅岩村
- Simplified Chinese: 红岩村
- Hanyu Pinyin: Hóngyáncūn
- Literal meaning: 'Red Rock Village'
Transcriptions
Standard Mandarin
- Hanyu Pinyin: Hóngyáncūn
- Wade–Giles: Hung^{2}-yen^{2}-ts‘un^{1}
- IPA: [xʊ̌ŋ.jɛ̌n.tsʰwə́n]
Yue: Cantonese
- Yale Romanization: Hùhngngàahmchyūn
- Jyutping: hung4 ngaam4 cyun1
- IPA: [hʊŋ˩.ŋam˩.tsʰyn˥]

General information
- Location: Chongqing; China
- Coordinates: 29.5535157°N 106.4895489°E
- Operator: Chongqing Rail Transit Corp., Ltd
- Lines: Line 5 Line 9
- Platforms: 1 island platform 2 side platforms

Construction
- Structure type: Underground

Other information
- Station code: / / /

History
- Opened: 25 January 2022; 4 years ago (Line 9); 30 November 2023; 2 years ago(Line 5)

Services
Preceding station	Chongqing Rail Transit	Following station
Zhongshutuo towards Yuegangbeilu	Line 5	Xietaizi towards Tiaodeng
Tuwan towards Gaotanyan	Line 9	Fuhualu towards Huashigou
Location

Hongyancun is a station served by Line 9 and Line 5 of Chongqing Rail Transit in Chongqing Municipality, China that opened in 2022. It is located in Yuzhong District.

The station is the deepest metro station in the world. The deepest point of the station is 116 meters (381 ft) below street level. and the top of rail is 106 meters (348 ft) below the surface. By either measure, the depth breaks China's previous record depth of Line 10's Hongtudi station and surpasses the depth of the Kyiv Metro's Arsenalna station, the previous record for deepest metro station.

This station has 2 entrances, an upper entrance and a lower entrance (which is lower than the platform level).

The vertical height difference between Entrance 2 and Entrance 4 of the station is over 141 meters (463 ft). From Entrance 2, passengers will need to take a three-segment ascending moving walkway that is approximately 105 meters long, and it takes about 6 minutes to access the Line 9 platform; while from Entrance 4, its a seven-segment descending escalator ride that takes about 8 minutes (if not by lift).

== See also ==
- Hongyancun Museum
