= Fuhualu station =

Chongqing Rail Transit station

Fuhualu 富华路
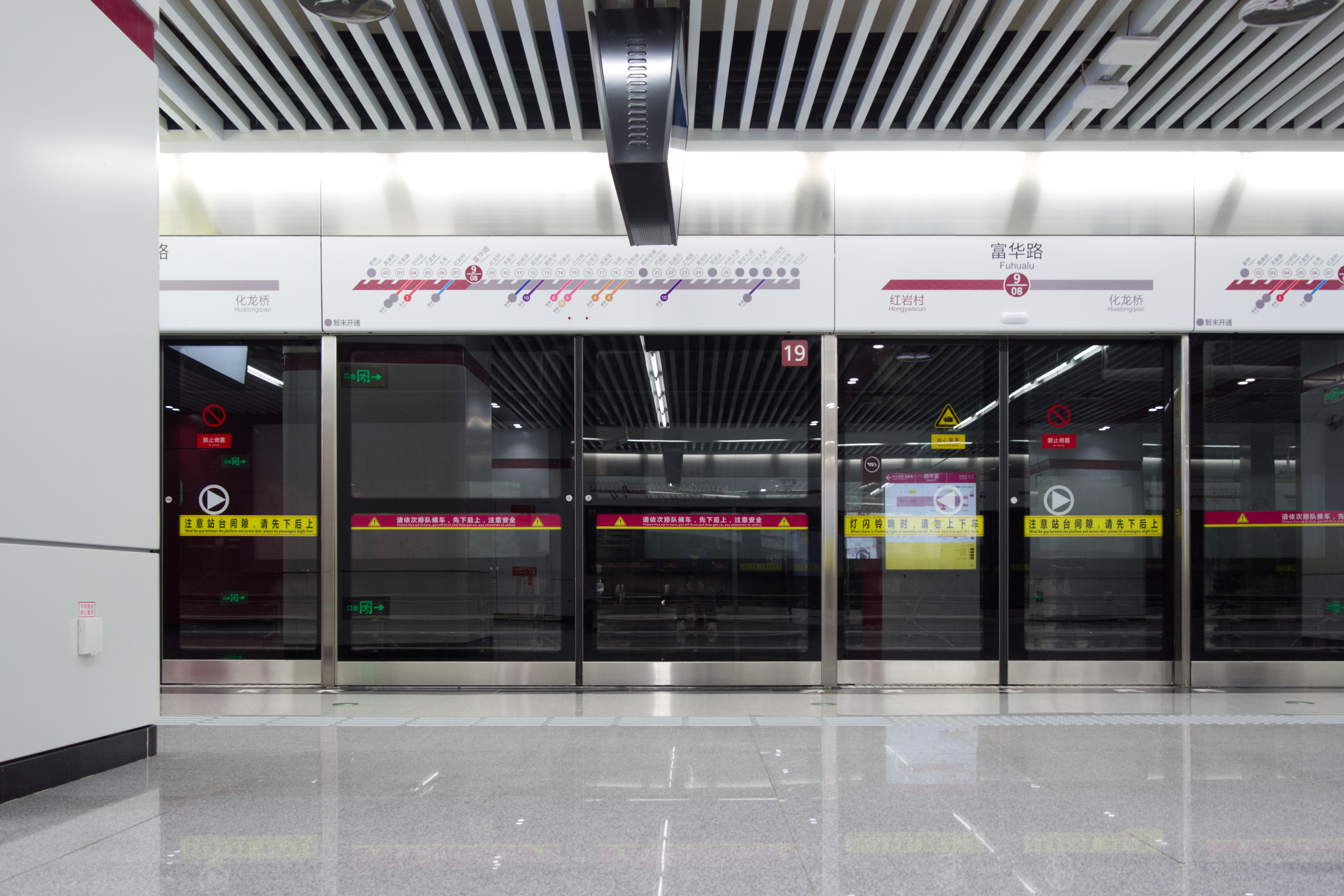

General information
- Location: Yuzhong District, Chongqing; China
- Coordinates: 29.55367°N 106.50001°E
- Operator: Chongqing Rail Transit Corp., Ltd
- Lines: Line 9 Line 18
- Platforms: 4 (2 island platforms)

Construction
- Structure type: Underground

Other information
- Station code: / /

History
- Opened: 25 January 2022

Services
Preceding station	Chongqing Rail Transit	Following station
Hongyancun towards Gaotanyan	Line 9	Hualongqiao towards Huashigou
Terminus	Line 18	Xietaizi towards Tiaodengnan
Location

Fuhualu station (Chinese: 富华路站; pinyin: Fùhuálù zhàn; lit. 'Fuhua Road station') is a station on Line 9 and Line 18 of Chongqing Rail Transit in Chongqing municipality, China, which opened in 2022. It is located in Yuzhong District.

== Station structure ==
There are two island platforms at this station, located separately on two floors. The lower one is for Line 9 trains traveling in both directions, while the upper one is for Line 18 trains.

B2; Concourse	Exits, Customer service, Vending machines
B3; Platforms	Line 18 termination platform
B3; Platforms	Island platform
B3; Platforms	Line 18 to Tiaodengnan (Xietaizi)
B4; Platforms	Line 9 to Gaotanyan (Hongyancun)
B4; Platforms	Island platform
B4; Platforms	Line 9 to Huashigou (Hualongqiao)
