= Tianlilu station =

Chongqing Rail Transit station

Tianlilu 天梨路
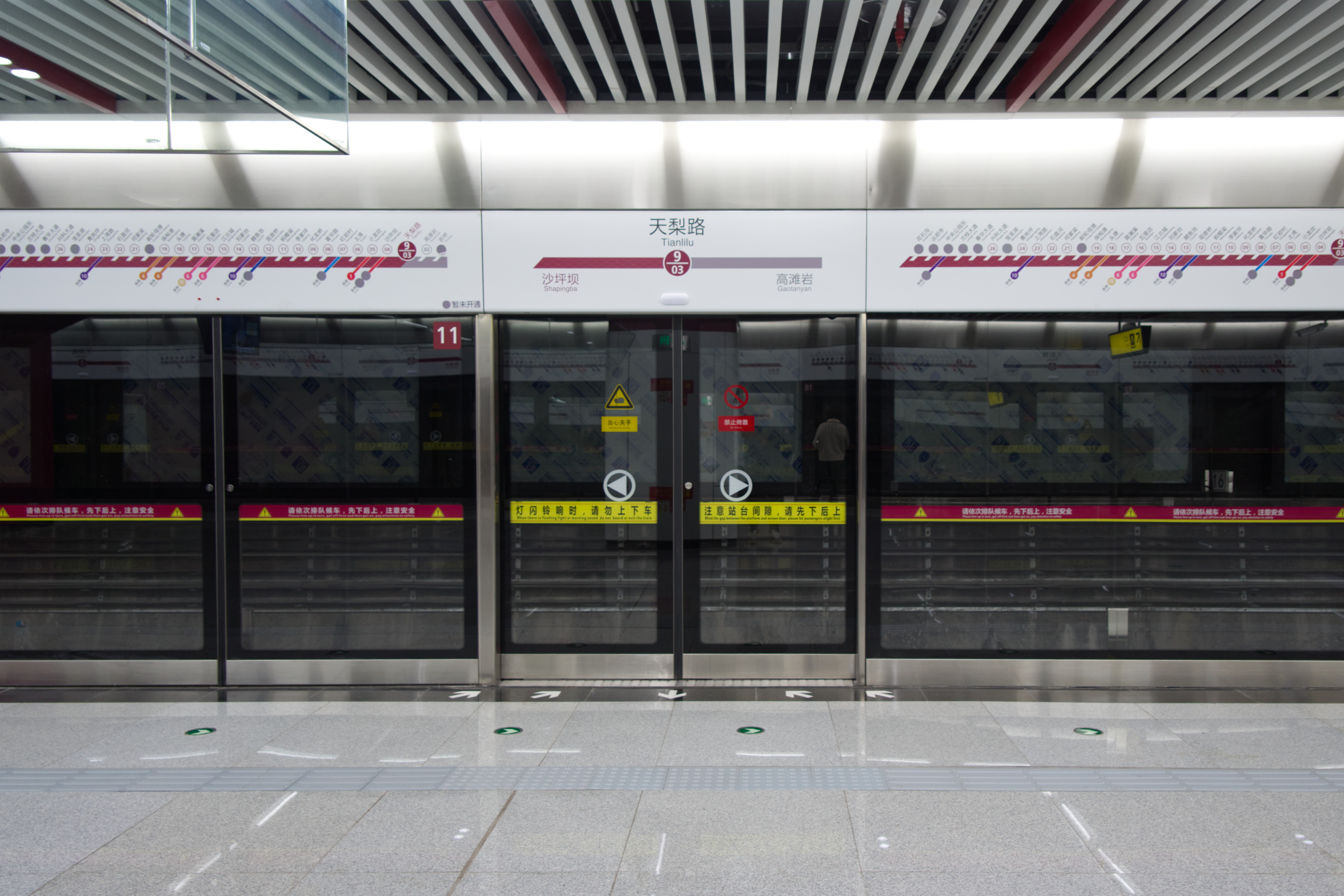

General information
- Location: Chongqing; China
- Operated by: Chongqing Rail Transit Corp., Ltd
- Line: Line 9
- Platforms: 2 (1 island platform)

Construction
- Structure type: Underground

Other information
- Station code: /

History
- Opened: 25 January 2022

Services
Preceding station	Chongqing Rail Transit	Following station
Gaotanyan Terminus	Line 9	Shapingba towards Huashigou
Location

Tianlilu station (Chinese: 天梨路站; pinyin: Tiānlílù zhàn; lit. 'Tianli Road station') is a station on Line 9 of Chongqing Rail Transit in Chongqing municipality, China, which opened in 2022. It is located in Shapingba District.
