= Arsenalna (Kyiv Metro) =

Kyiv Metro Station

Arsenalna Арсенальна
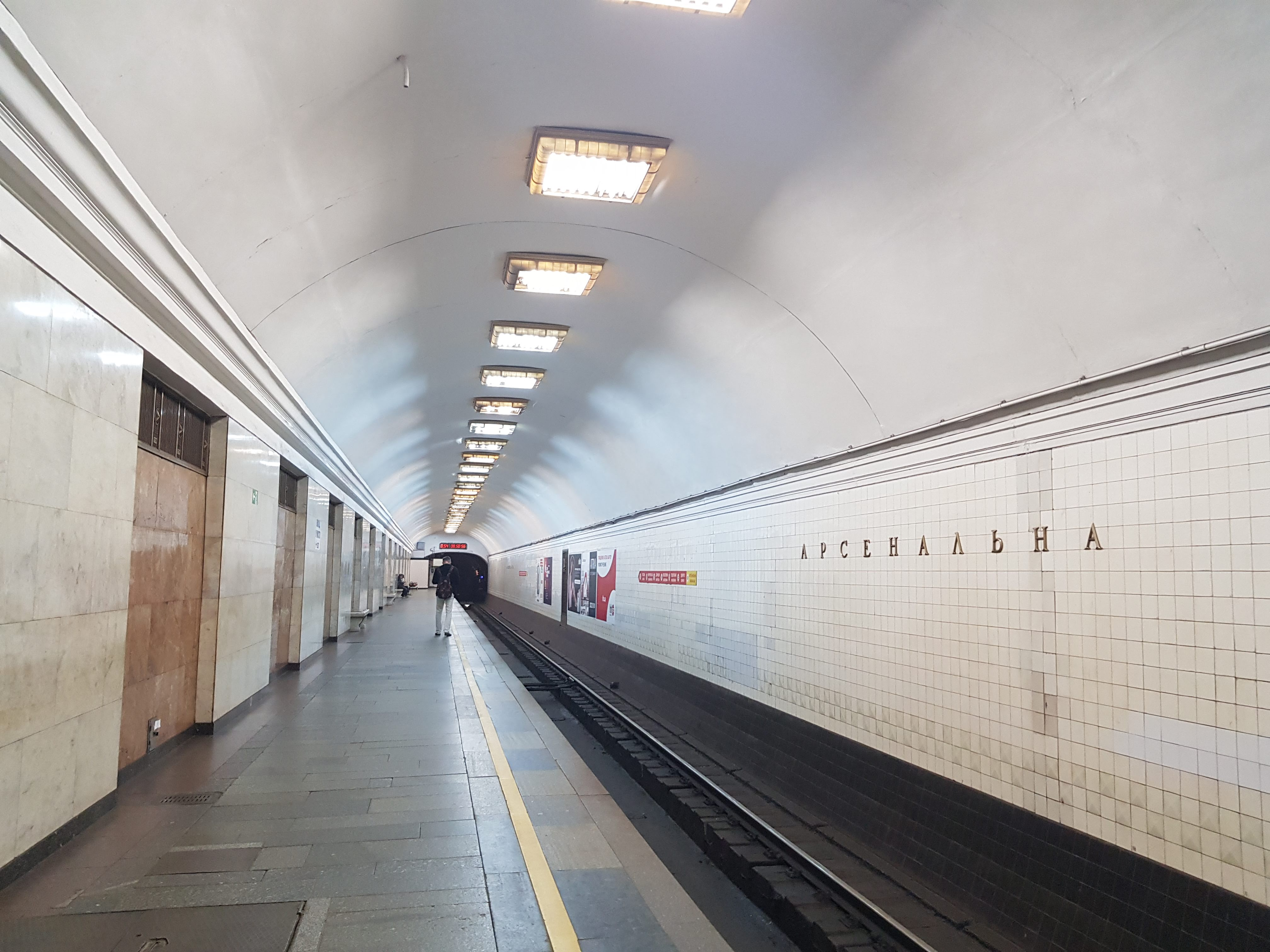
- Arsenalna's platform in 2019

General information
- Location: Pecherskyi District, Kyiv
- Coordinates: 50°26′40″N 30°32′44″E
- Owner: Kyiv Metro
- Line: Sviatoshynsko–Brovarska line
- Platforms: 1
- Tracks: 2

Construction
- Depth: 130.5 m (428 ft)

Other information
- Station code: 121

History
- Opened: 6 November 1960

Passengers
- 2008: 14,200

Services
Preceding station	Kyiv Metro	Following station
Khreshchatyk towards Akademmistechko	Sviatoshynsko–Brovarska line	Dnipro towards Lisova

Immovable Monument of Local Significance of Ukraine
- Official name: Станція метро «Арсенальна» (Arsenalna metro station)
- Type: Architecture
- Reference no.: 3340-Кв
Location

Arsenalna (Ukrainian: Арсенальна, IPA: [ɐrseˈnɑlʲnɐ]) is a station on the Kyiv Metro's Sviatoshynsko-Brovarska Line. The station was opened along with the first stage and is currently the second-deepest station in the world at 105.5 metres (346 ft), after Hongyancun station of the Chongqing Metro. The depth is attributed to the geography of Kyiv, whose high bank of the Dnipro River rises above the rest of the city. Also unusual is the station's design, which lacks a central concourse and thus is similar in layout to stations of the London Underground.

Since 1986, the station has the status of "Architectural Monument of Local Significance", Protection Number 187.

== Station ==
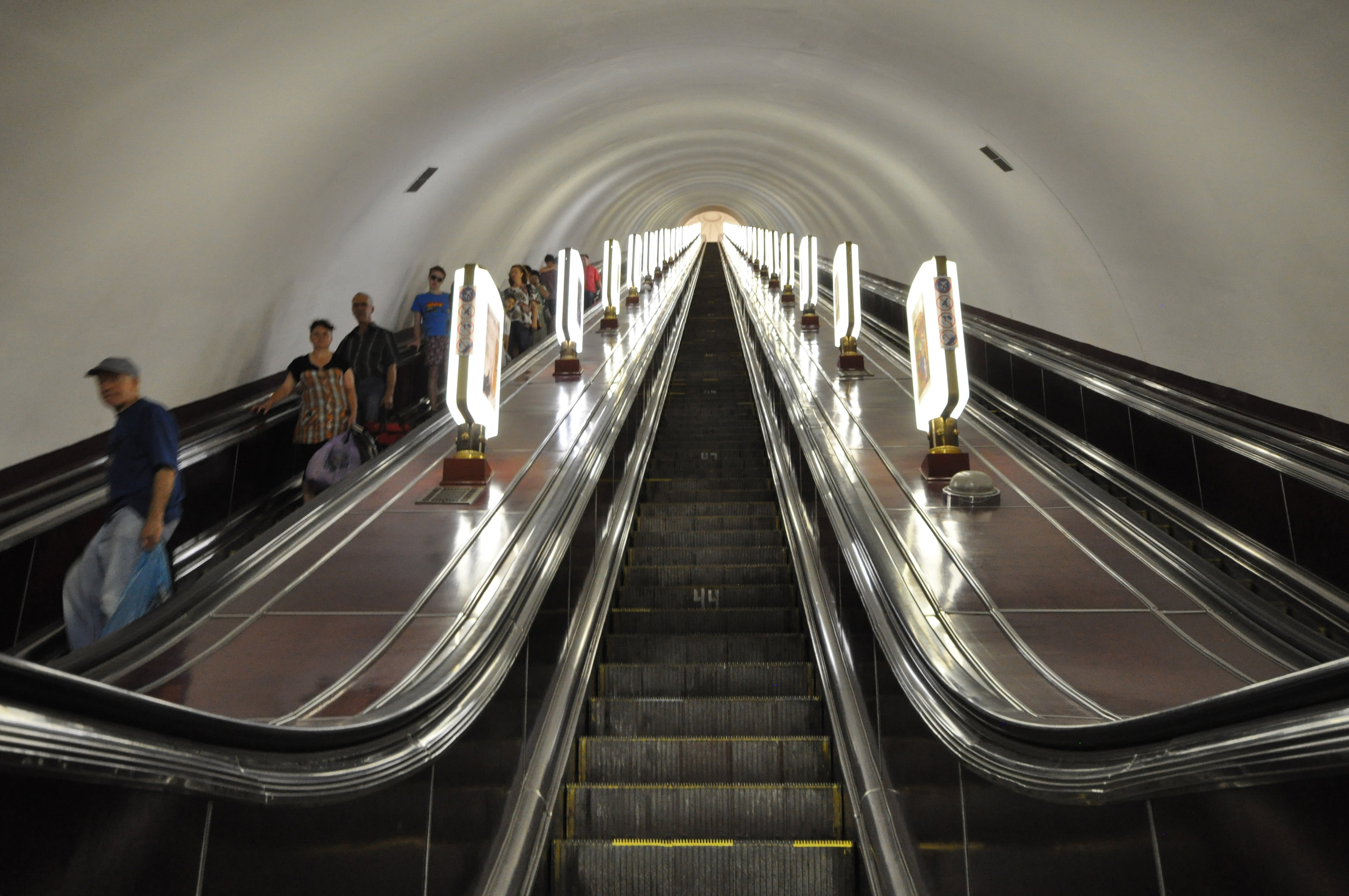
Escalators

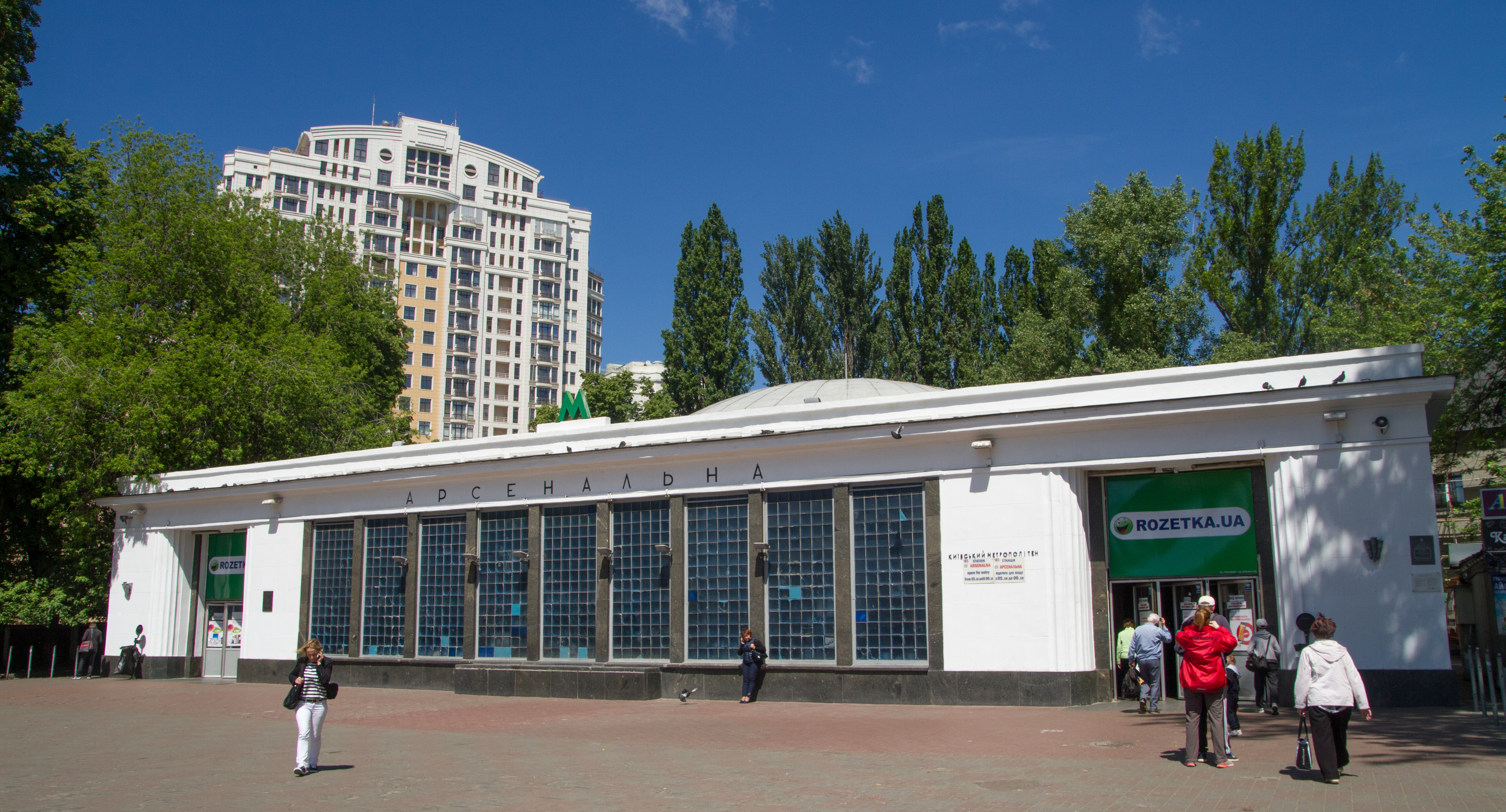
Surface vestibule

Arsenalna station was designed by architects G Granatkin, S Krushynksky and N Shchukina. It is the only station to be built as a pylon trivault type in the Kyiv metro.

Although Arsenalna appears as a pylon trivault, the "pylons" along with their portals are all purely cosmetic decorations. The station has a small lobby that connects to both platforms and the escalator tunnel.

The station was opened along with the first stage and is currently the second deepest station in the world at 105.5 metres (346 ft), surpassed by Hongyancun station of the Chongqing Metro system in 2023. The two-step escalator of Arsenalna station is the deepest descent in Kyiv - 55.8 + 46.6 m. It is the oldest in the Kyiv metro. The ride on the escalators itself is one of the longest, totaling up to five minutes.

There are reasons for the layout of the stations, as the cosmetic pylons were planned to be real; the tough soils of the location, and the problems with hydro-isolation. Construction between the two excavated pits was extremely difficult. To prevent it caving in the soil was frozen; around a reinforced concrete ring weighing more than three thousand tons about 400 wells were dug and filled with liquid nitrogen.

Similar problems were encountered on the first stage in Moscow, however later the stations Lubyanka and Chistye Prudy were completed. In Kyiv, this never was to happen. Originally built as a siding on a long track before the line crossed the Dnieper and continuing into the left bank residential districts, with the Kyiv Arsenal Factory, for which the station was named, being the only source of passengers, it was never to have large passenger traffic to justify a complex and costly reconstruction. Nor was the station ever planned to be a transfer point (unlike the Moscow stations, which ultimately was the reason for them to be rebuilt). However, as the historic Arsenal Factory is now home to the Mystetskyi Arsenal Museum, the traffic increase brought by visitors to the Museum could justify a construction of a central vault.

Decoratively, apart from the aforementioned portals, the station is monochromatic in its appearance. The plastered vault ceilings and ceramic tiled walls are white, white and pink Novoselets marble covers the “pylons” and the aluminum castings are anodised in bronze, in common with other first-tier stations. Marble benches and track wall grilles are also standard. A large sculptural artwork depicting the Kiev Arsenal January Uprising that took place in the Arsenal Factory in 1918 graced the wall of the main lobby hall until it was removed in the early 1990s and lost.

The station's large surface vestibule is situated on the square leading onto Ivana Mazepy, Dmytro Godzenko, and Mykhailo Hrushevsky streets. Behind the station is a service bay that is used for nighttime stands and minor repairs to the railcar park.

The station vestibule went into reconstruction in 2020 and was opened partly in 2021. The complete reconstruction and restoration of nearby historical buildings were finished in August 2021 and the complete vestibule and the square around it was opened on 2 September 2021.

Since the 2022 Russian invasion of Ukraine, the station has been used as a bomb shelter.

== Service ==
The first train to Lisova departs at 6:01 am, the one to Akademmistechko departs at 5:48 am.

The last train to Lisova departs at 12:30 am, and to Akademmistechko at 12:18 am.
