= Line 9 (Chongqing Rail Transit) =

Metro line of Chongqing Rail Transit

- 9
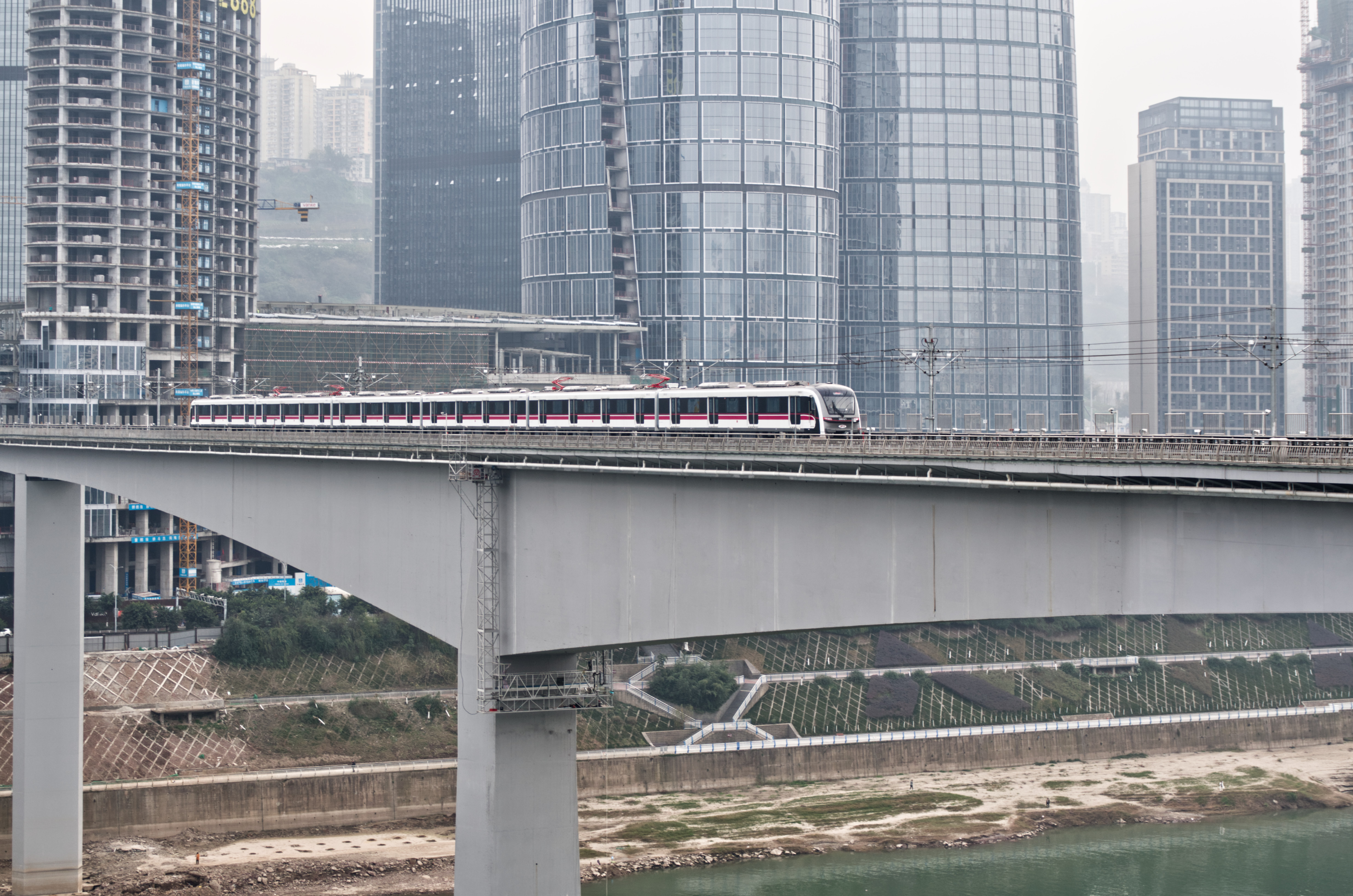
- A train of Line 9 passing Jiahua railway bridge

Overview
- Native name: 重庆轨道交通9号线
- Status: Operational
- Owner: Chongqing City Transportation Development & Investment Group
- Line number: 9
- Locale: Chongqing, China
- Termini: Gaotanyan (future: Xinqiao); Huashigou
- Stations: 31 (29 in operation)

Service
- Type: Rapid transit
- System: Chongqing Rail Transit
- Operator: Chongqing Rail Transit Operation Co., Ltd.
- Depot(s): Xinqiao, Taiwan Industrial Park, Huashigou

History
- Opened: 25 January 2022; 4 years ago

Technical
- Line length: 40.00 km (24.85 mi)
- Num of tracks: 2
- Character: Mostly underground with little sections elevated
- Track gauge: 1,435 mm (4 ft 8 1/2 in)
- Electrification: Overhead line, 1,500 V DC
- Operating speed: 100 km/h (62 mph)

Line 9 of CRT is a rapid transit line in Chongqing, China. This line contains the highest and deepest metro stations in the world, Hualongqiao station and Hongyancun station, respectively.

== History ==
The line began construction on September 28, 2016.

=== Opening timeline ===
Segment	Commencement	Length	Station(s)	Name
Gaotanyan – Xingke Ave. (Note: except Cruise Port station and Baoshenghu stations.)	25 January 2022	31.3 km (19.4 mi)	23	Phase 1
Baoshenghu	28 July 2022	infill station	1	Phase 1
Xingke Ave. – Huashigou	18 January 2023	7.8 km (4.8 mi)	5	Phase 2

== Stations ==
Route of Line 9

Service routes		Station No.	Station name		Connections	Distance km		Location
Service routes		Station No.	English	Chinese	Connections	Distance km		Location
		/	Xinqiao	新桥		-	0.0	Shapingba
●	●	/	Gaotanyan	高滩岩		1.9	1.9	Shapingba
●	●	/	Tianlilu	天梨路		1.2	3.0	Shapingba
●	●	/	Shapingba	沙坪坝	Loop line Line 1 27; CYW	1.3	4.3	Shapingba
●	●	/	Xiaolongkan	小龙坎	Line 1	1.0	5.3	Shapingba
●	●	/	Tuwan	土湾		1.1	6.3	Shapingba
●	●	/	Hongyancun	红岩村	Line 5	1.2	7.6	Yuzhong
●	●	/	Fuhualu	富华路	Line 18	1.1	8.7	Yuzhong
●	●	/	Hualongqiao	化龙桥		1.9	10.6	Yuzhong
●	●	/	Lijiaping	李家坪		1.6	12.2	Liangjiang
●	●	/	Mahuangliang	蚂蝗梁		0.9	13.0	Liangjiang
●	●	/	Guanyinqiao	观音桥	Line 3 (Note: out of system transfer)	1.0	14.0	Liangjiang
●	●	/	Liyuchi	鲤鱼池	Line 10	1.7	15.7	Liangjiang
●	●	/	Liujiatai	刘家台		1.2	16.9	Liangjiang
●	●	/	Jiangbeicheng	江北城	Line 6	1.0	17.9	Liangjiang
●	●	/	Wulidian	五里店	Loop line Line 6	1.2	19.1	Liangjiang
●	●	/	Gailanxi	溉澜溪		1.0	20.1	Liangjiang
●	●	/	Toutang	头塘	Line 4	1.7	21.9	Liangjiang
●	●	/	Baoshuigang	保税港	Line 4	1.4	23.2	Liangjiang
｜	｜	/	Cruise Port Station	邮轮母港		0.9	24.1	Liangjiang
●	●	/	Hejialiang	何家梁		0.7	24.8	Liangjiang
●	●	/	Shipanhe	石盘河		1.6	26.4	Liangjiang
●	●	/	Shangwanlu	上湾路	Line 10	1.9	28.3	Liangjiang
●	●	/	Qinggangping	青岗坪		1.7	30.0	Liangjiang
●	●	/	Baoshenghu	宝圣湖	15	2.0	32.0	Liangjiang
●	●	/	Xingke Ave.	兴科大道		1.2	33.2	Liangjiang
●		/	Chunhua Ave.	春华大道		2.3	35.5	Liangjiang
●		/	Langui Ave.	兰桂大道		1.0	36.5	Liangjiang
●		/	Central Park East	中央公园东	Line 10	1.2	37.6	Liangjiang
●		/	Congyansi	丛岩寺		2.6	40.2	Liangjiang
●		/	Huashigou	花石沟		1.1	41.3	Liangjiang

== Gallery ==
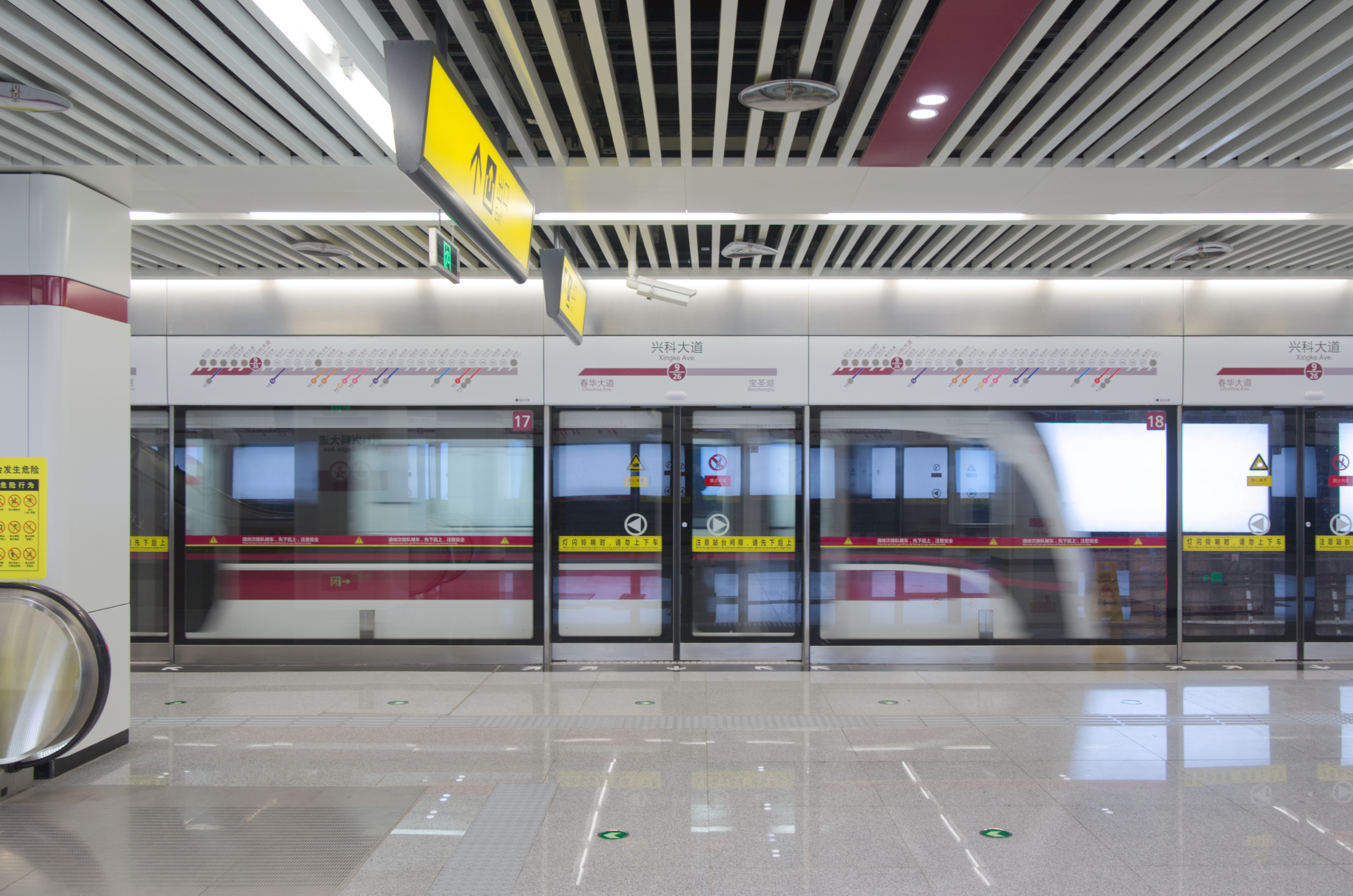
Xingke Ave. station of Line 9

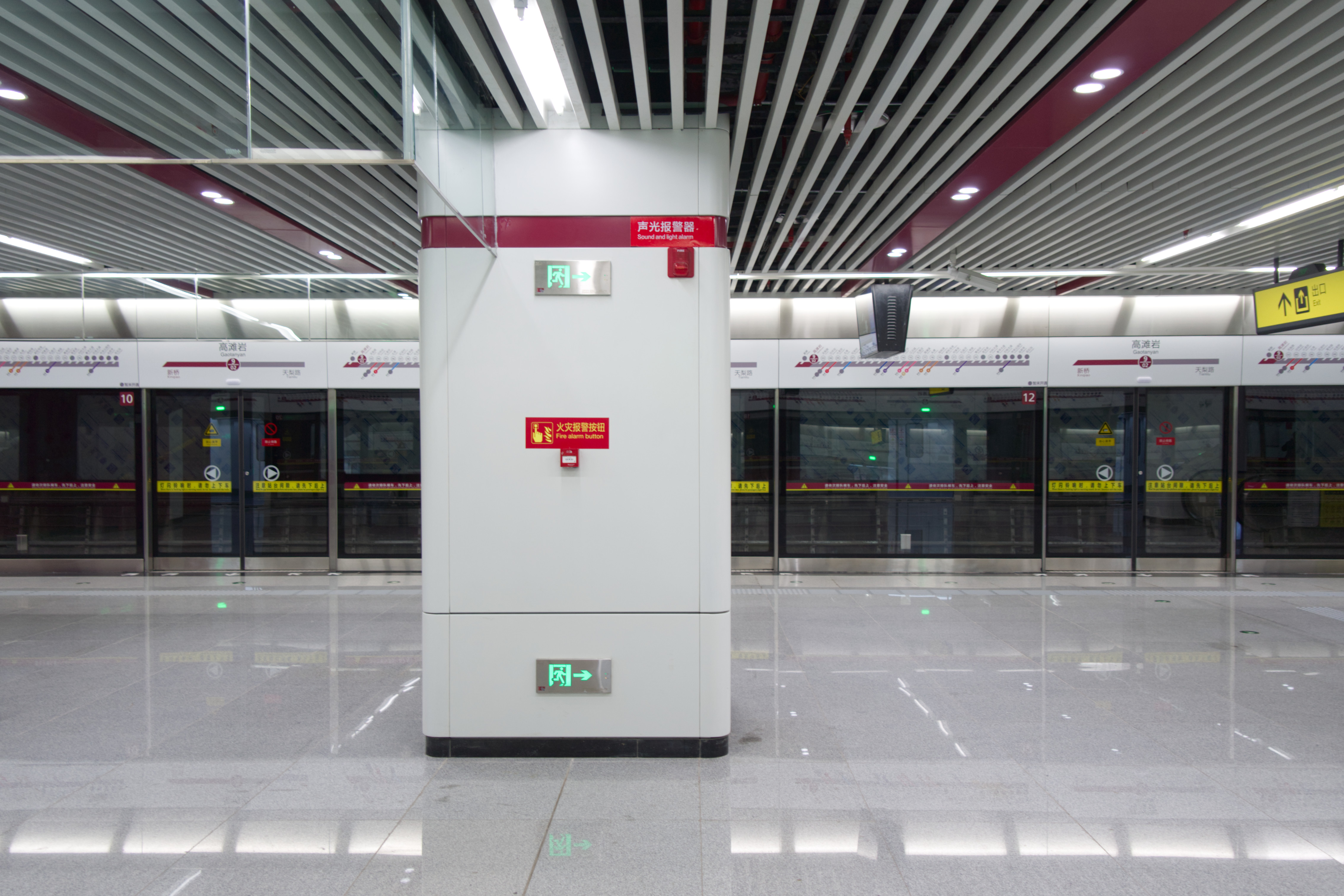
Gaotanyan station of Line 9

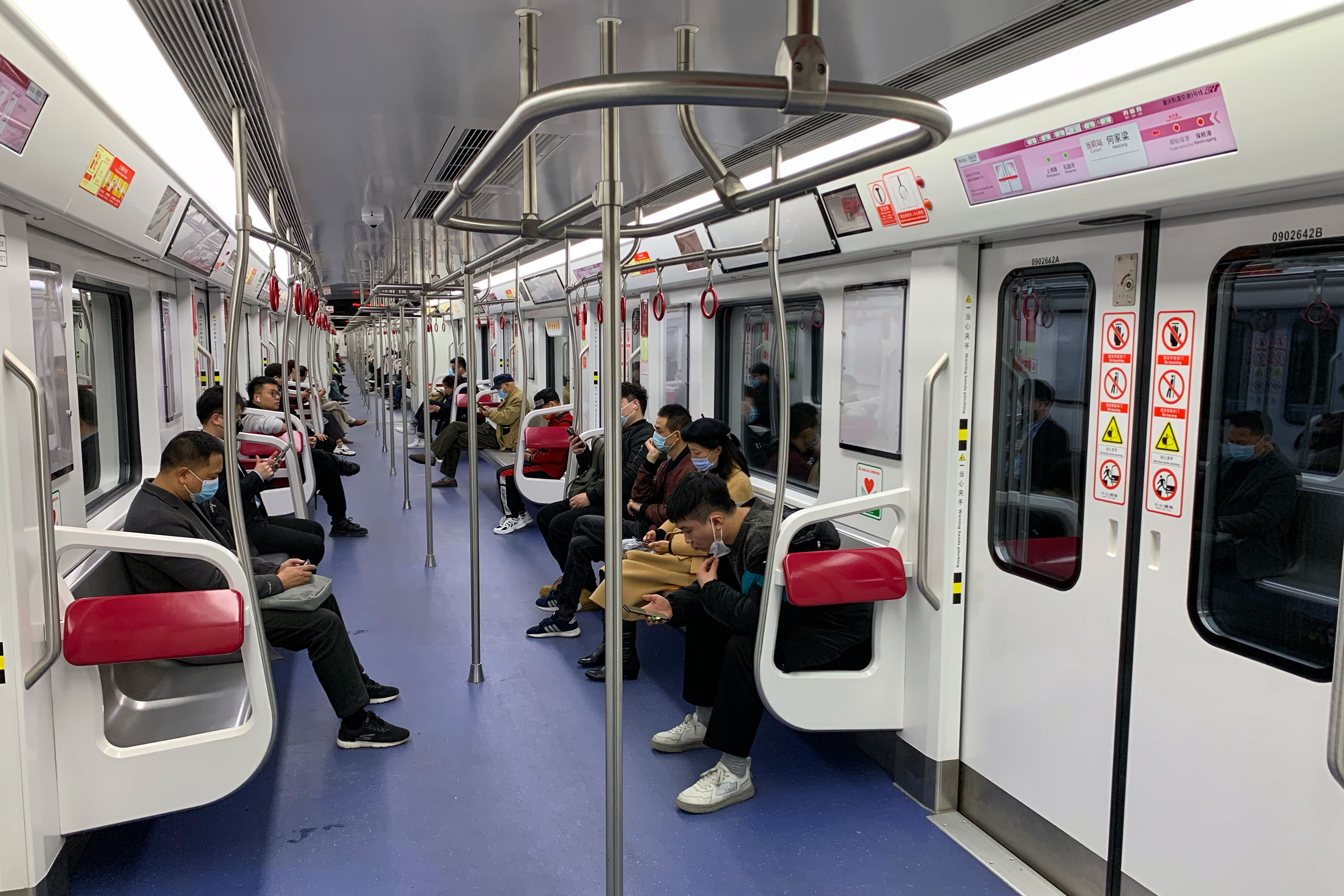
Interior of a Line 9 train
