= Gaotanyan station =

Chongqing Rail Transit station

Gaotanyan 高滩岩
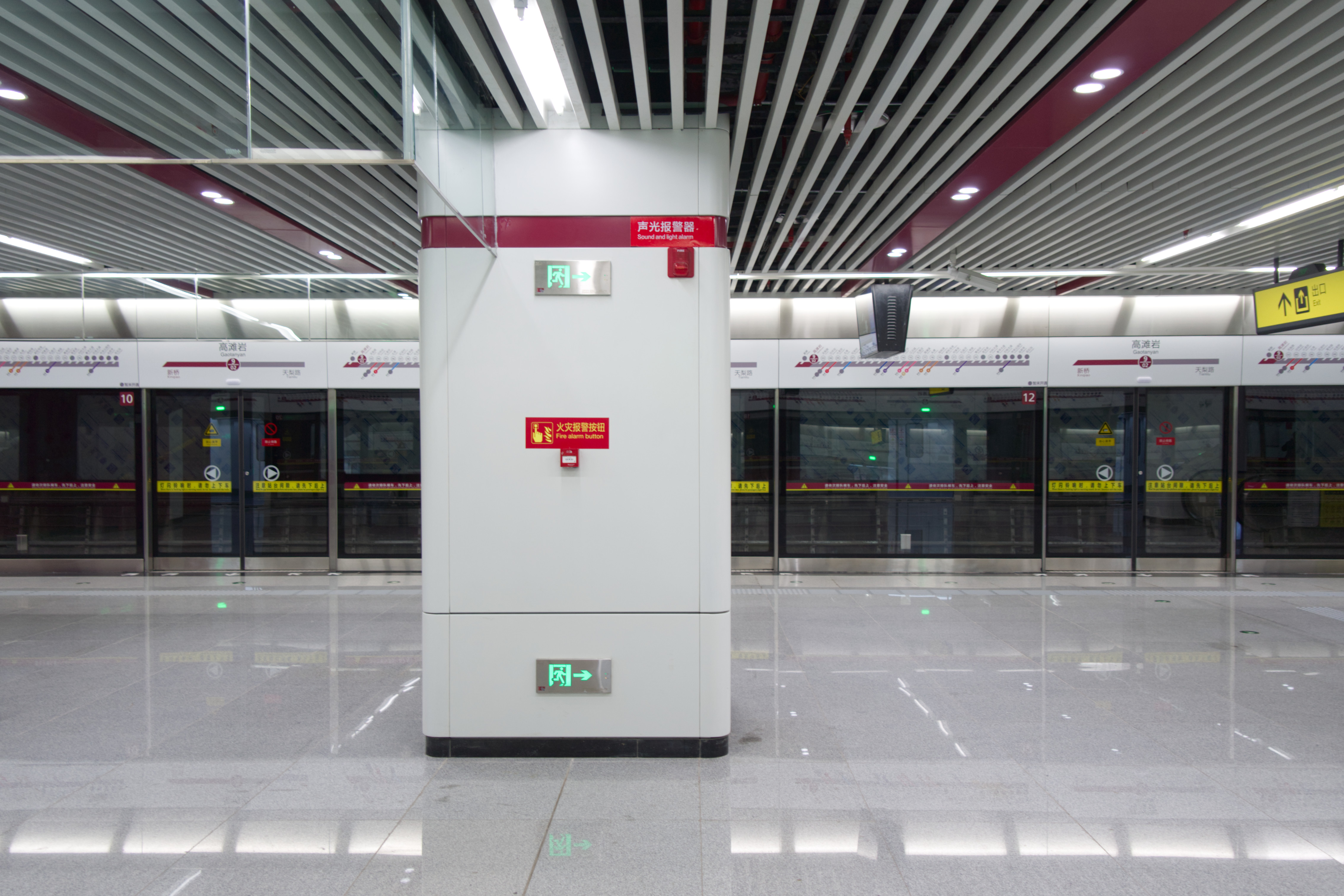

General information
- Location: Chongqing; China
- Coordinates: 29.54146°N 106.44547°E
- Operated by: Chongqing Rail Transit Corp., Ltd
- Line: Line 9
- Platforms: 2 (1 island platform)

Construction
- Structure type: Underground

Other information
- Station code: /

History
- Opened: 25 January 2022

Services
Preceding station	Chongqing Rail Transit	Following station
Terminus	Line 9	Tianlilu towards Huashigou
Location

Gaotanyan Station is a station on Line 9 of Chongqing Rail Transit in Chongqing municipality, China, which opened in 2022. It is located in Shapingba District.
