= Huixing =

Huixing may refer to:

- Huixing (educator) (1871–1905), Qing dynasty educator who founded a women's school
- Huixing Station, Chongqing, China (Chinese: 回兴; pinyin: huíxìng)
- Huixing Subdistrict, Henan, China (Chinese: 会兴; pinyin: huìxìng)
- HuiXing (American music producer)
