= Gaobaohu station =

Chongqing Rail Transit station

Gaobaohu 高堡湖
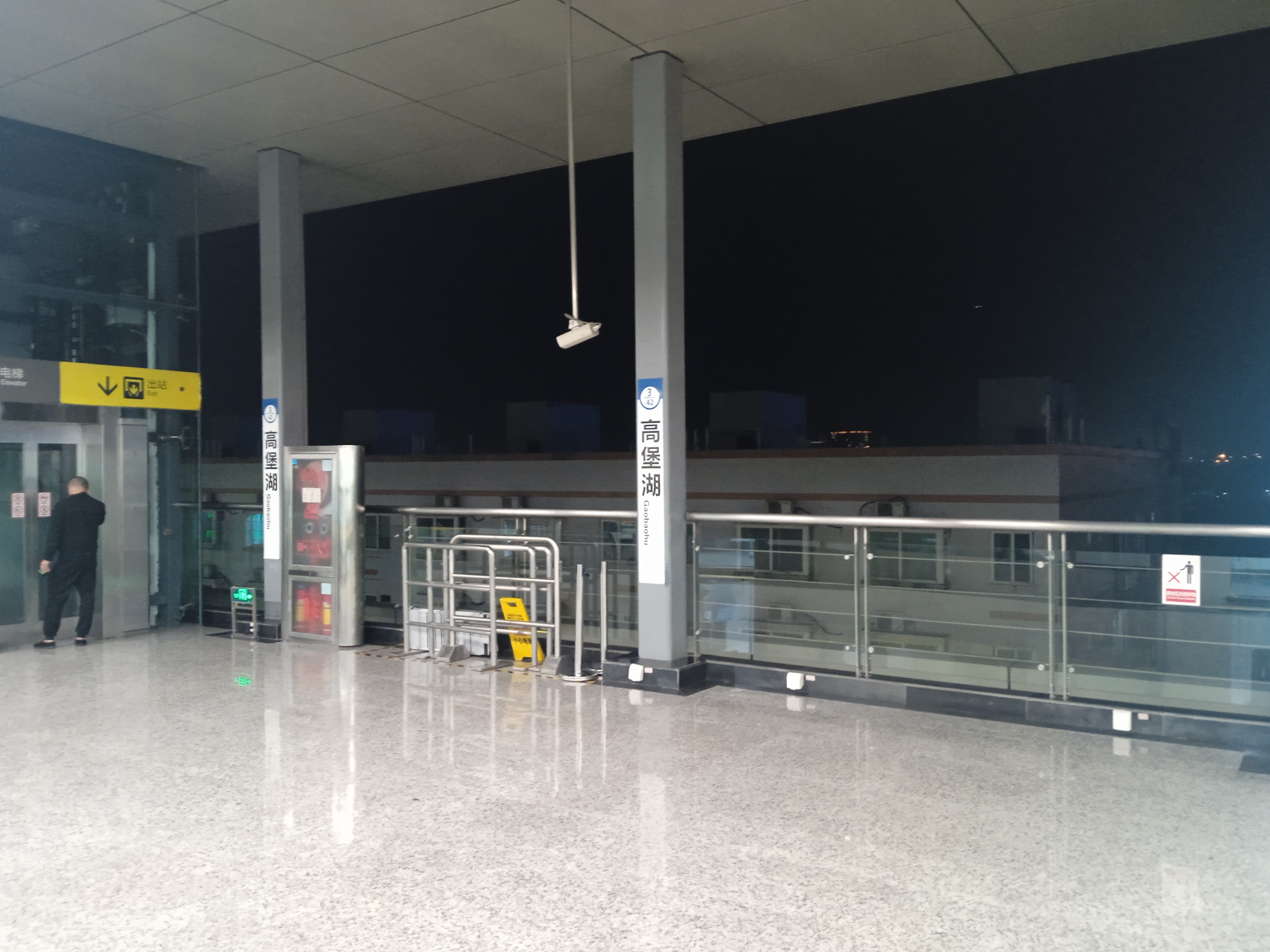

General information
- Location: Chongqing; China
- Coordinates: 29.7547°N 106.6392°E
- Operator: Chongqing Rail Transit Corp., Ltd
- Line: Line 3 (Konggang Branch)
- Platforms: 2 side platforms

Construction
- Structure type: Elevated

Other information
- Station code: 3/42

History
- Opened: 28 December 2016

Services
Preceding station	Chongqing Rail Transit	Following station
Konggang Square towards Bijin	Line 3 Konggang branch	Guanyuelu towards Jurenba
Location

Gaobaohu Station is a station on Line 3 of Chongqing Rail Transit in Chongqing municipality, China. It is located in Yubei District and opened in 2016.

== Station structure ==
3F; Platforms	Side platform
3F; Platforms	Line 3 – Konggang branch to Bijin (Konggang Square)
3F; Platforms	Line 3 – Konggang branch to Jurenba (Guanyuelu)
3F; Platforms	Side platform
2F; Concourse	Exits, Customer service, Vending machines, Toilets
