= Konggang Square station =

Chongqing Rail Transit station

Konggang Square 空港广场
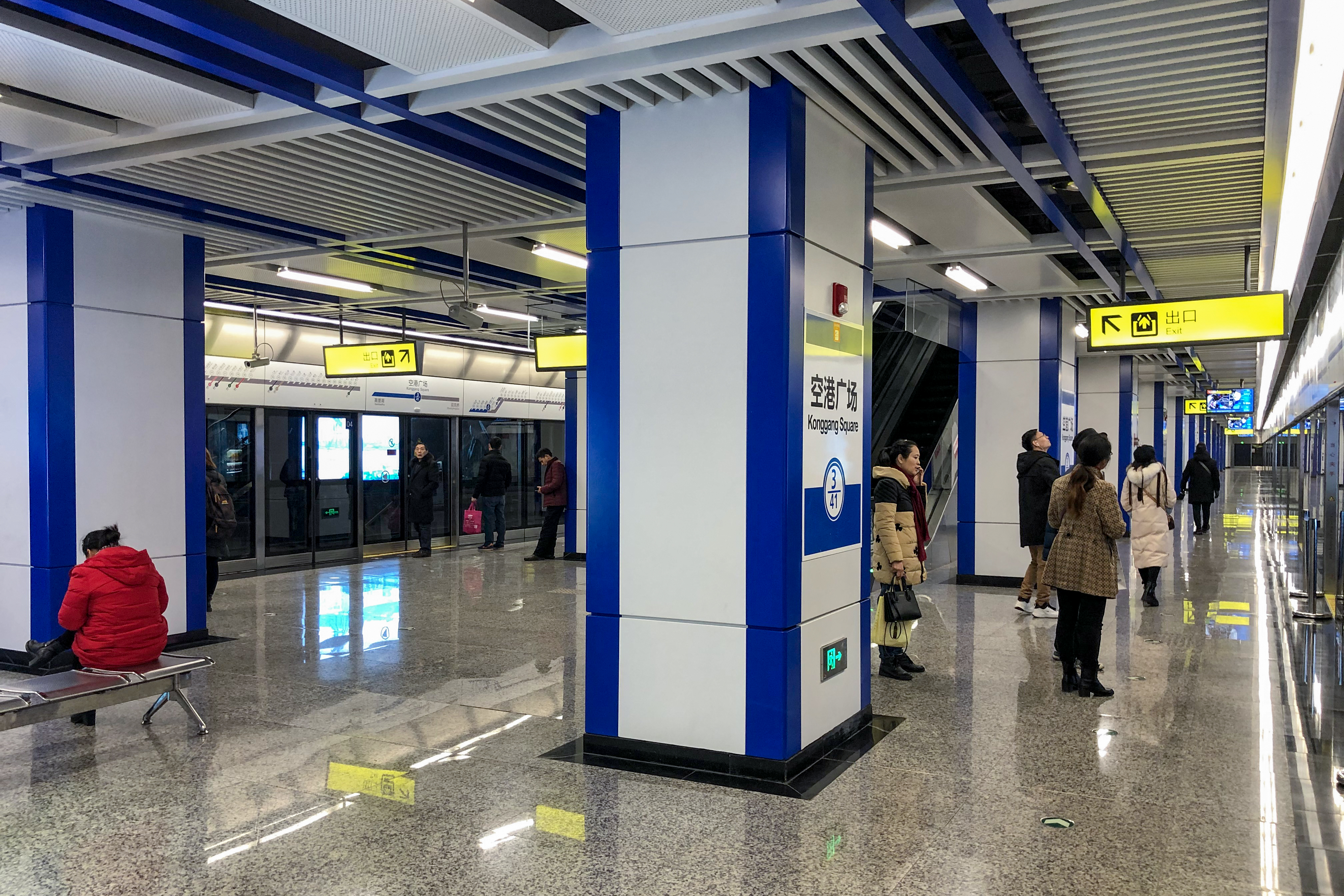
- Station platform

General information
- Location: Chongqing; China
- Operator: Chongqing Rail Transit Corp., Ltd
- Line: Line 3 (Konggang Branch)
- Platforms: 2 (1 island platform)

Construction
- Structure type: Underground

Other information
- Station code: 3/41

History
- Opened: 28 December 2016

Services
Preceding station	Chongqing Rail Transit	Following station
Shuangfengqiao towards Bijin	Line 3 Konggang branch	Gaobaohu towards Jurenba
Location

Konggang Square Station is a station on Line 3 of Chongqing Rail Transit in Chongqing municipality, China. It is located in Yubei District and opened in 2016. This station is also the only underground station of Line 3 Konggang Branch.

== Station structure ==
B1; Concourse	Exits, Customer service, Vending machines
B2; Platforms	Line 3 – Konggang branch to Bijin (Shuangfengqiao)
B2; Platforms	Island platform
B2; Platforms	Line 3 – Konggang branch to Jurenba (Gaobaohu)
