= Shuanglong station (Chongqing Rail Transit) =

Metro station in Chongqing, China

Shuanglong 双龙
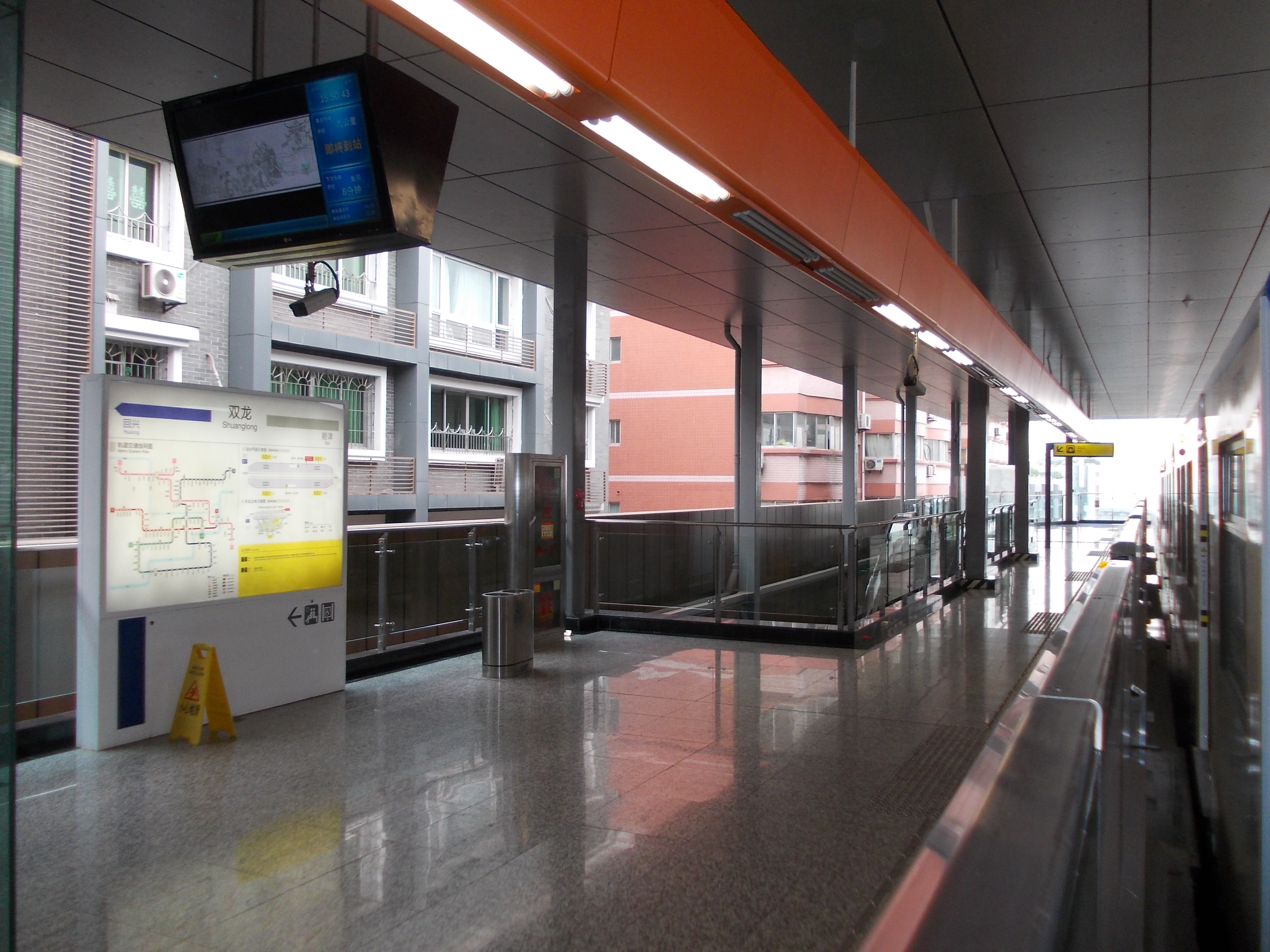

General information
- Location: Yubei District, Chongqing; China
- Operator: Chongqing Rail Transit Corp., Ltd
- Line: Line 3
- Platforms: 2 side platforms

Construction
- Structure type: Elevated

Other information
- Station code: 3/37

History
- Opened: 30 December 2011

Services
Preceding station	Chongqing Rail Transit	Following station
Huixing towards Yudong	Line 3	Bijin towards Terminal 2 of Jiangbei Airport
Location

Shuanglong is a station on Line 3 of Chongqing Rail Transit in Chongqing Municipality, China. It is located in the Yubei District. It opened in 2011.

== Station structure ==
3F; Platforms	Side platform
3F; Platforms	Line 3 to Yudong (Huixing)
3F; Platforms	Line 3 to Terminal 2 of Jiangbei Airport (Bijin)
3F; Platforms	Side platform
2F; Concourse	Exits, Customer service, Vending machines, Toilets
