= Nanping station (Chongqing Rail Transit) =

Metro station in Chongqing, China

Nanping 南坪
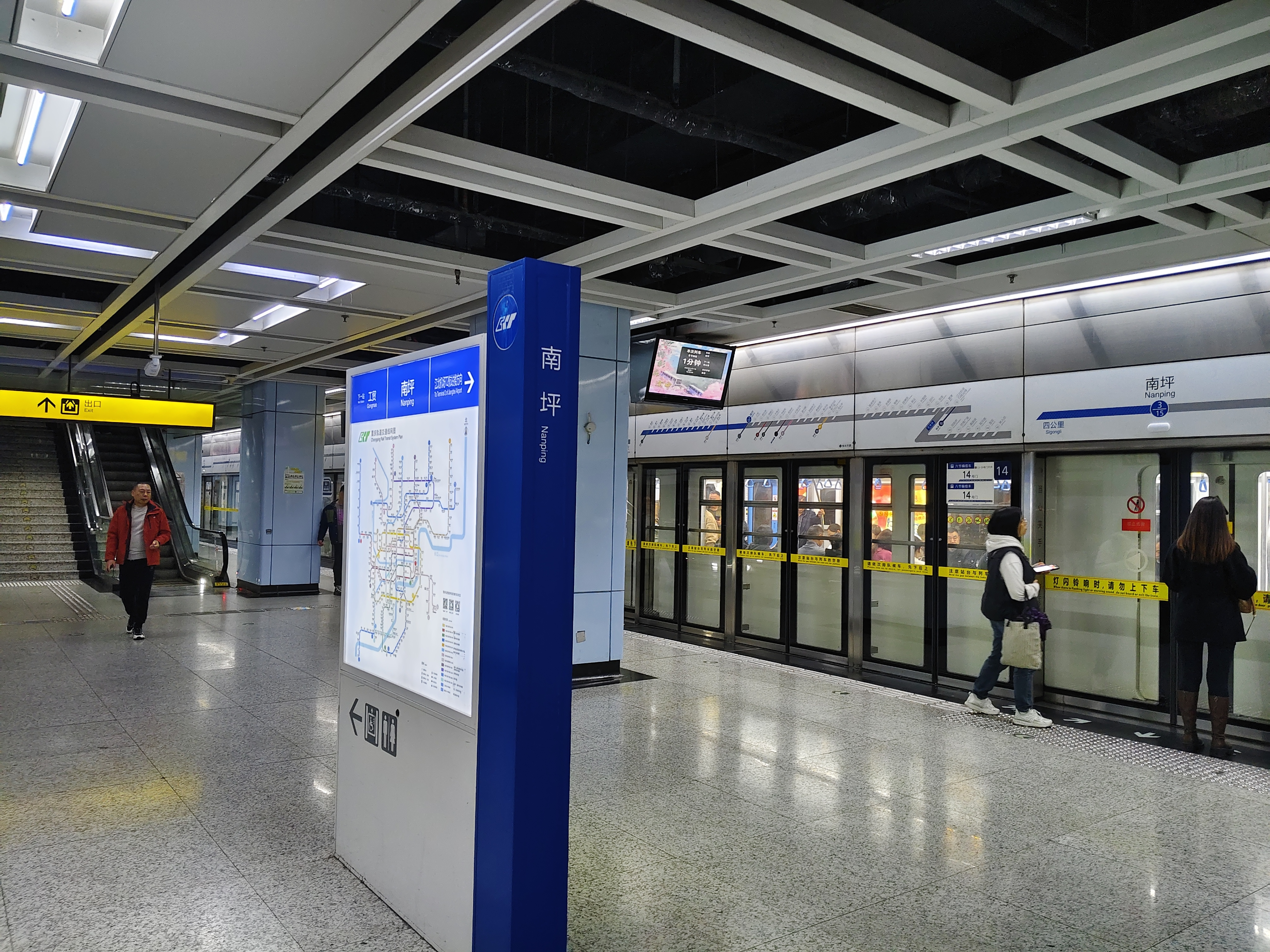
- Platform of Line 3

General information
- Location: Chongqing; China
- Operated by: Chongqing Rail Transit Corp., Ltd
- Line: Line 3
- Platforms: 2 (1 island platform)

Construction
- Structure type: Underground

Other information
- Station code: 3/15

History
- Opened: 30 December 2011; 14 years ago (Line 3)

Services
| Preceding station | Chongqing Rail Transit | Following station |
|---|---|---|
| Sigongli towards Yudong | Line 3 | Gongmao towards Terminal 2 of Jiangbei Airport |
Location

Nanping is a station on Line 3 of Chongqing Rail Transit in Chongqing Municipality, China. Line 10 will also reach here when Phase 2 is completed. The station is located in Nan'an District. It opened in 2011.

== Station structure ==
=== Line 3 ===
| B1; Concourse | Exits, Customer service, Vending machines |
| B2; Platforms | Line 3 to Yudong (Sigongli) |
| B2; Platforms | Island platform |
| B2; Platforms | Line 3 to Terminal 2 of Jiangbei Airport (Gongmao) |
