= Guanyuelu station =

Chongqing Rail Transit station

Guanyuelu 观月路
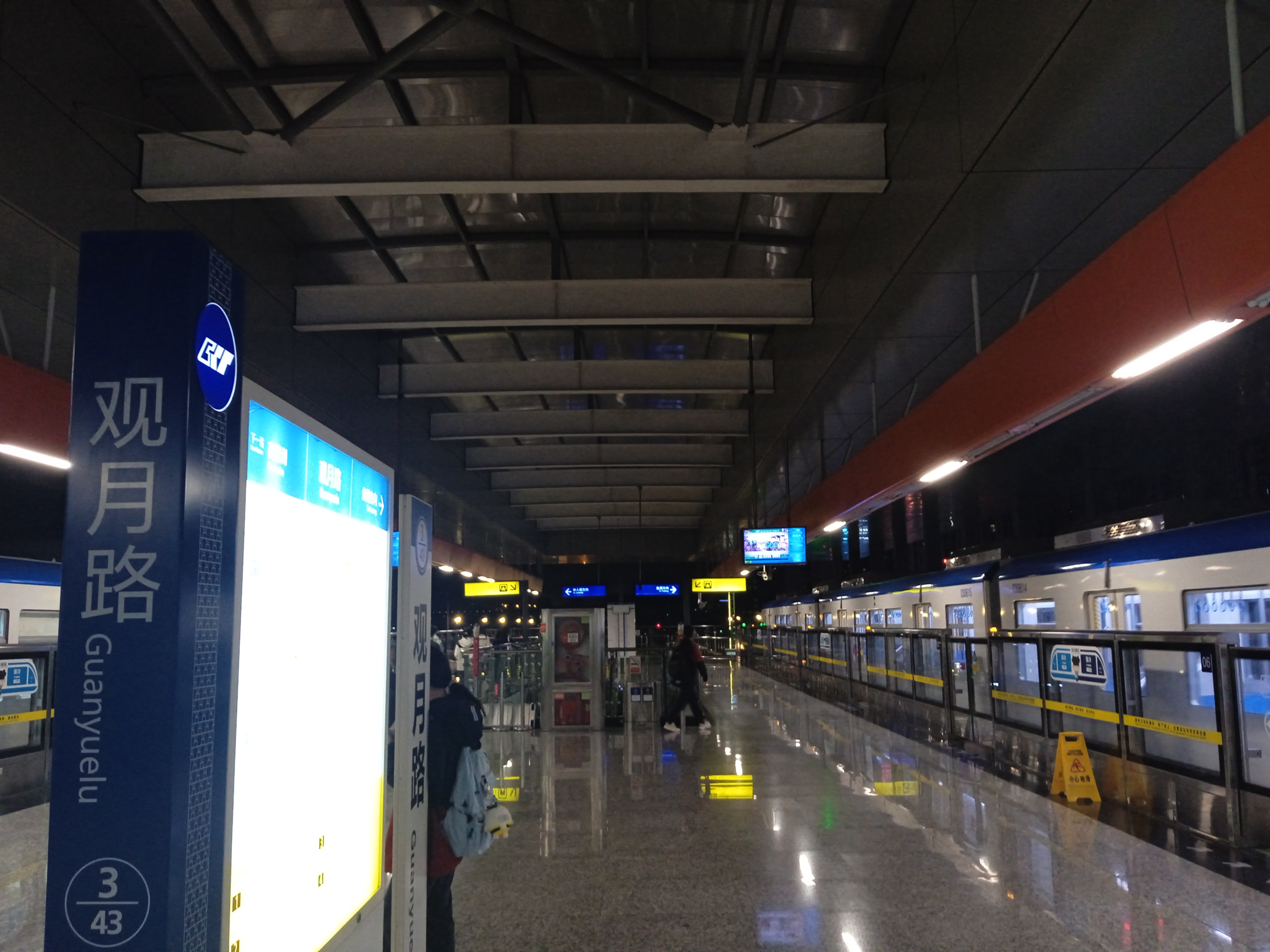
- Interior of station

General information
- Location: Chongqing; China
- Coordinates: 29.7778°N 106.6490°E
- Operator: Chongqing Rail Transit Corp., Ltd
- Line: Line 3 (Konggang Branch)
- Platforms: 2 (1 island platform)

Construction
- Structure type: Elevated

Other information
- Station code: 3/43

History
- Opened: 28 December 2016

Services
Preceding station	Chongqing Rail Transit	Following station
Gaobaohu towards Bijin	Line 3 Konggang branch	Lianhua towards Jurenba
Location

Guanyuelu station (Chinese: 观月路站; pinyin: Guānyuèlù zhàn; lit. 'Guanyue Road station') is a station on Line 3 of Chongqing Rail Transit in Chongqing municipality, China. It is located in Yubei District and opened in 2016.

== Station structure ==
3F; Platforms	Line 3 – Konggang branch to Bijin (Gaobaohu)
3F; Platforms	Island platform
3F; Platforms	Line 3 – Konggang branch to Jurenba (Lianhua)
2F; Concourse	Exits, Customer service, Vending machines, Toilets
