= Shuangfengqiao station (Chongqing Rail Transit) =

Chongqing Rail Transit station

Shuangfengqiao 双凤桥
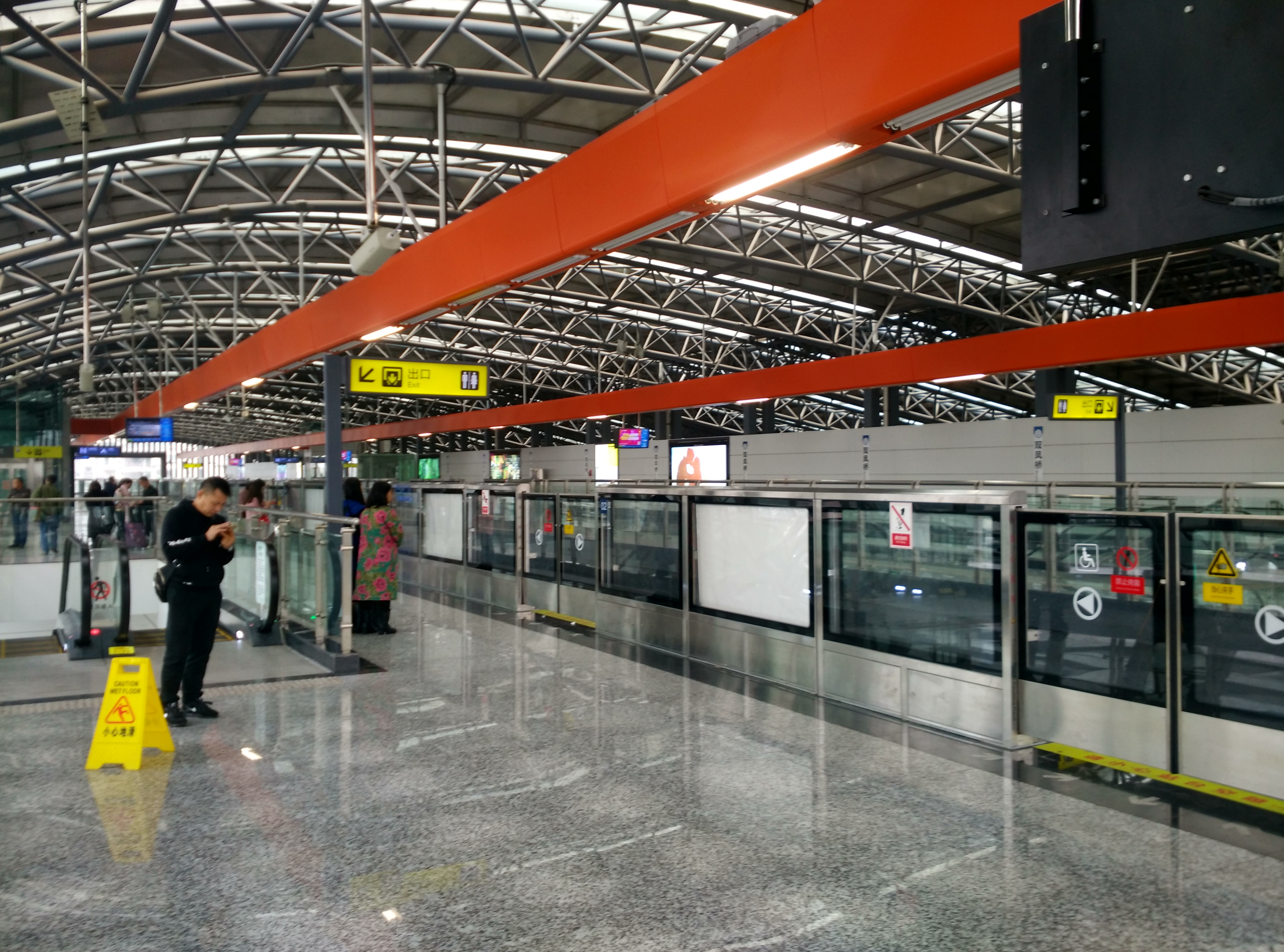
- Station platform

General information
- Location: Chongqing; China
- Coordinates: 29.7318°N 106.6288°E
- Operator: Chongqing Rail Transit Corp., Ltd
- Line: Line 3 (Konggang Branch)
- Platforms: 2 side platforms

Construction
- Structure type: Elevated

Other information
- Station code: 3/40

History
- Opened: 28 December 2016

Services
Preceding station	Chongqing Rail Transit	Following station
Bijin Terminus	Line 3 Konggang branch	Konggang Square towards Jurenba
Location

Shuangfengqiao Station is a station on Line 3 of Chongqing Rail Transit in Chongqing municipality, China. It is located in Yubei District and opened in 2016. Because this station was built with Shuangfengqiao Public Transport Hub, the exterior of this station varies from other elevated stations of Line 3.

== Station structure ==
3F; Platforms	Side platform
3F; Platforms	Line 3 – Konggang branch to Bijin (Terminus)
3F; Platforms	Line 3 – Konggang branch to Jurenba (Konggang Square)
3F; Platforms	Side platform
2F; Concourse	Exits, Customer service, Vending machines, Toilets
