= Gongmao =

Gongmao may refer to:

- Qing Guanmao, Qing official headwear, the headwear of officials during the Qing dynasty in China
- Gongmao Station, Chongqing, China
- Liu Zi's courtesy name
