= Cuiyun =

Cuiyun may refer to:

- Cuiyun Station, Chongqing, China
- Simao District, Yunnan, China, formerly known as Cuiyun District
