= Longtousi station =

Metro station in Chongqing, China

Longtousi 龙头寺
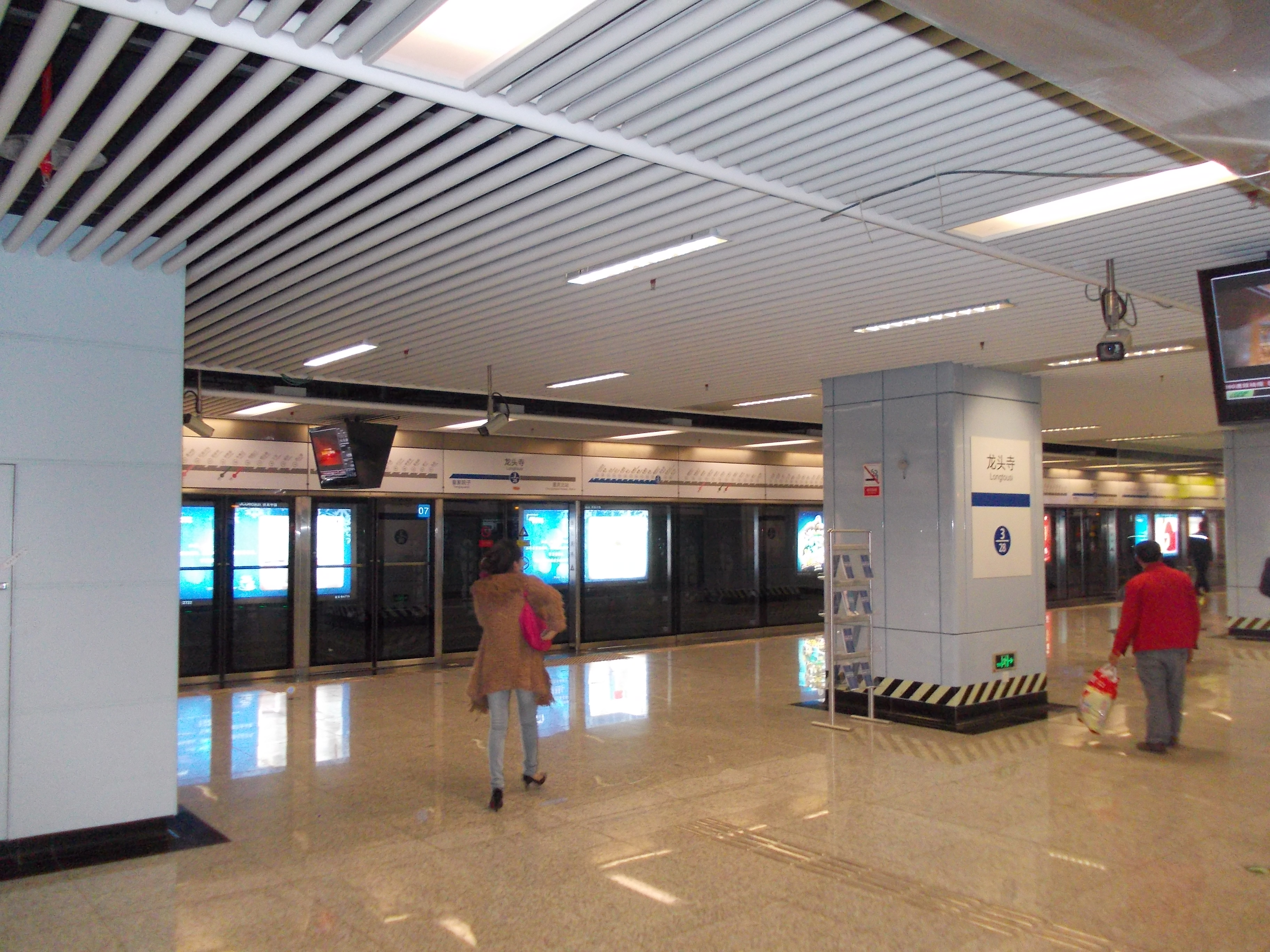
- Station platform

General information
- Location: Yubei District, Chongqing; China
- Operator: Chongqing Rail Transit Corp., Ltd
- Line: Line 3
- Platforms: 2 (1 island platform)

Construction
- Structure type: Underground

Other information
- Station code: 3/28

History
- Opened: 5 February 2013

Services
Preceding station	Chongqing Rail Transit	Following station
Chongqing North Station South Square towards Yudong	Line 3	Tongjiayuanzi towards Terminal 2 of Jiangbei Airport
Location

Longtousi is a station on Line 3 of Chongqing Rail Transit in Chongqing Municipality, China. It is located in Yubei District. It opened as an infill station in 2013.

== Station structure ==
B1; Concourse	Exits, Customer service, Vending machines, Toilets
B2; Platforms	Line 3 to Yudong (Chongqing North Station South Square)
B2; Platforms	Island platform
B2; Platforms	Line 3 to Terminal 2 of Jiangbei Airport (Tongjiayuanzi)
