= The EXPO Garden station =

Metro station in Chongqing, China

The EXPO Garden 园博园
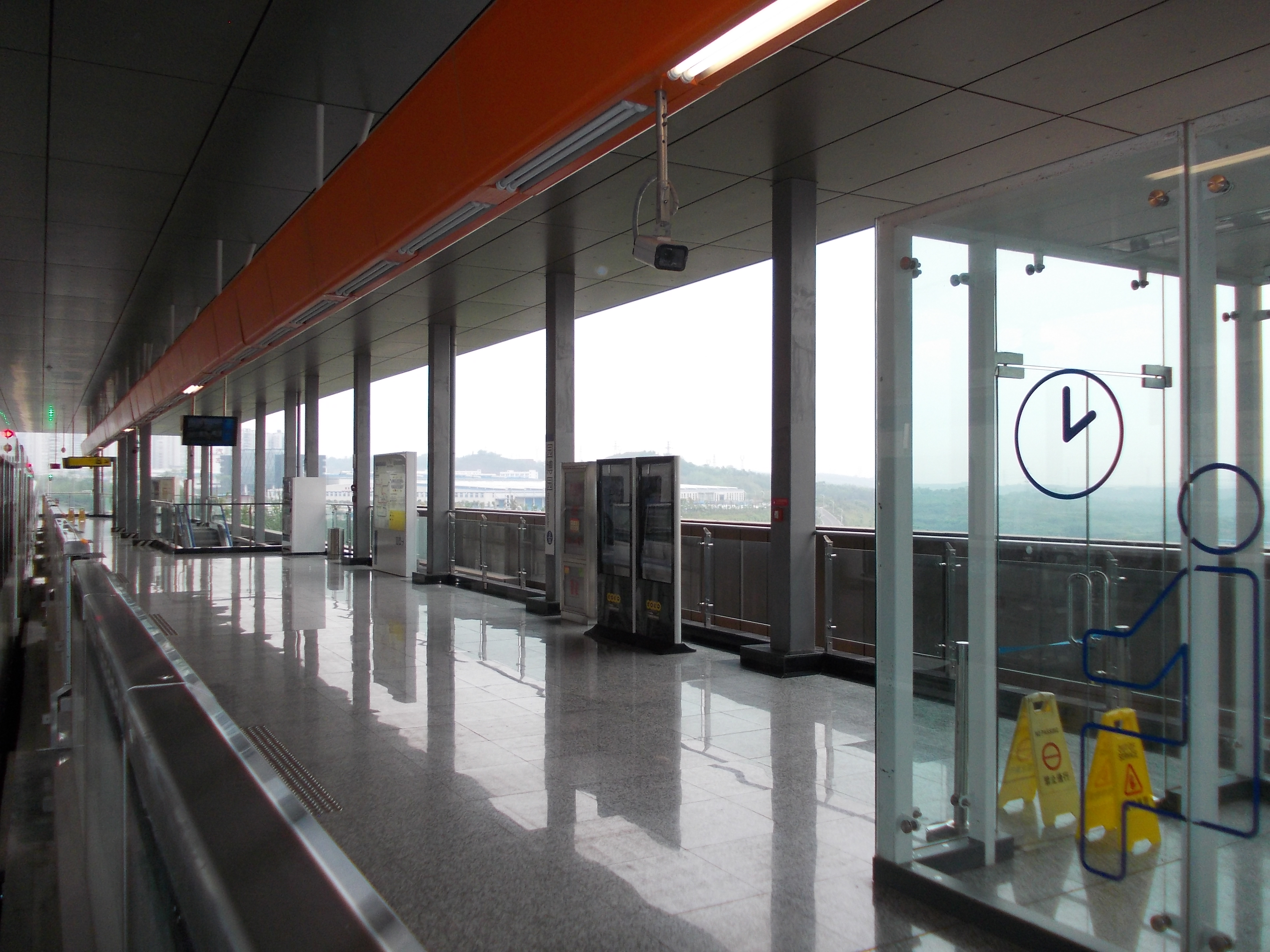

General information
- Location: Yubei District, Chongqing; China
- Coordinates: 29°40′39″N 106°33′36″E
- Operator: Chongqing Rail Transit Corp., Ltd
- Line: Line 3
- Platforms: 2 side platforms

Construction
- Structure type: Elevated

Other information
- Station code: /

History
- Opened: 8 October 2011

Services
| Preceding station | Chongqing Rail Transit | Following station |
|---|---|---|
| Yuanyang towards Yudong | Line 3 | Cuiyun towards Terminal 2 of Jiangbei Airport |
Location

The EXPO Garden is a station on Line 3 of Chongqing Rail Transit in Chongqing Municipality, China. It is located in Yubei District. It opened in 2011.

== Station structure ==
| 3F; Platforms | Side platform |
| 3F; Platforms | Line 3 to Yudong (Yuanyang) |
| 3F; Platforms | Line 3 to Terminal 2 of Jiangbei Airport (Cuiyun) |
| 3F; Platforms | Side platform |
| 2F; Concourse | Exits, Customer service, Vending machines, Toilets |
