= Chongqing Technology and Business University station =

Metro station in Chongqing, China

Chongqing Technology and Business University 重庆工商大学
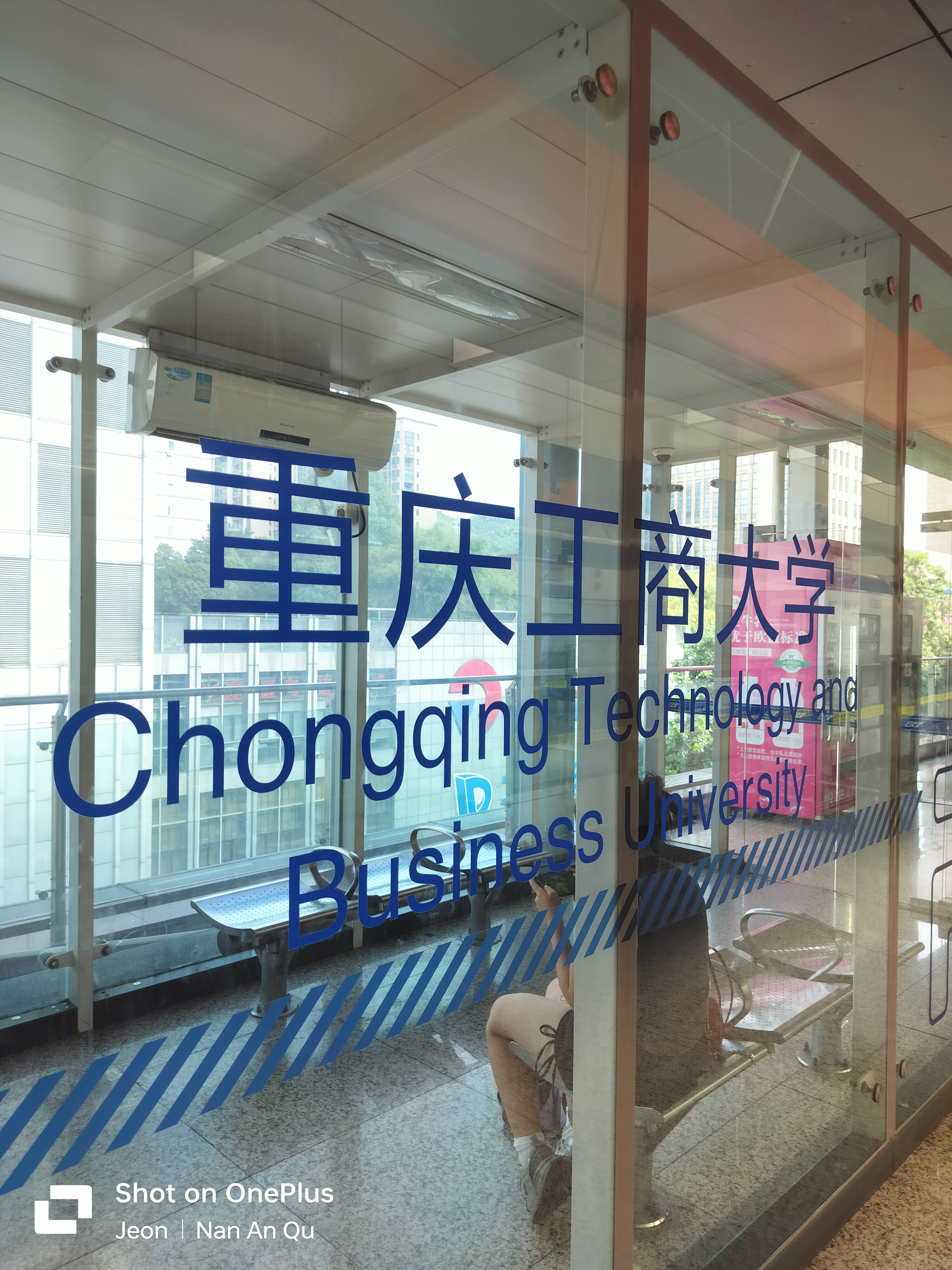

General information
- Location: Chongqing; China
- Coordinates: 29.51028°N 106.57014°E
- Operated by: Chongqing Rail Transit Corp., Ltd
- Line: Line 3
- Platforms: 2 side platforms

Construction
- Structure type: Elevated

Other information
- Station code: 3/13

History
- Opened: 30 December 2011

Services
Preceding station	Chongqing Rail Transit	Following station
Liugongli towards Yudong	Line 3	Sigongli towards Terminal 2 of Jiangbei Airport
Location

Chongqing Technology and Business University station (Chinese: 重庆工商大学站), formerly known as Wugongli station (五公里站), is a station on Line 3 of Chongqing Rail Transit in Chongqing Municipality, China. It is located in Nan'an District. It opened in 2011.

== Station structure ==
3F; Platforms	Side platform
3F; Platforms	Line 3 to Yudong (Liugongli)
3F; Platforms	Line 3 to Terminal 2 of Jiangbei Airport (Sigongli)
3F; Platforms	Side platform
2F; Concourse	Exits, Customer service, Vending machines, Toilets
