= Tongjiayuanzi station =

Metro station in Chongqing, China

Tongjiayuanzi 童家院子
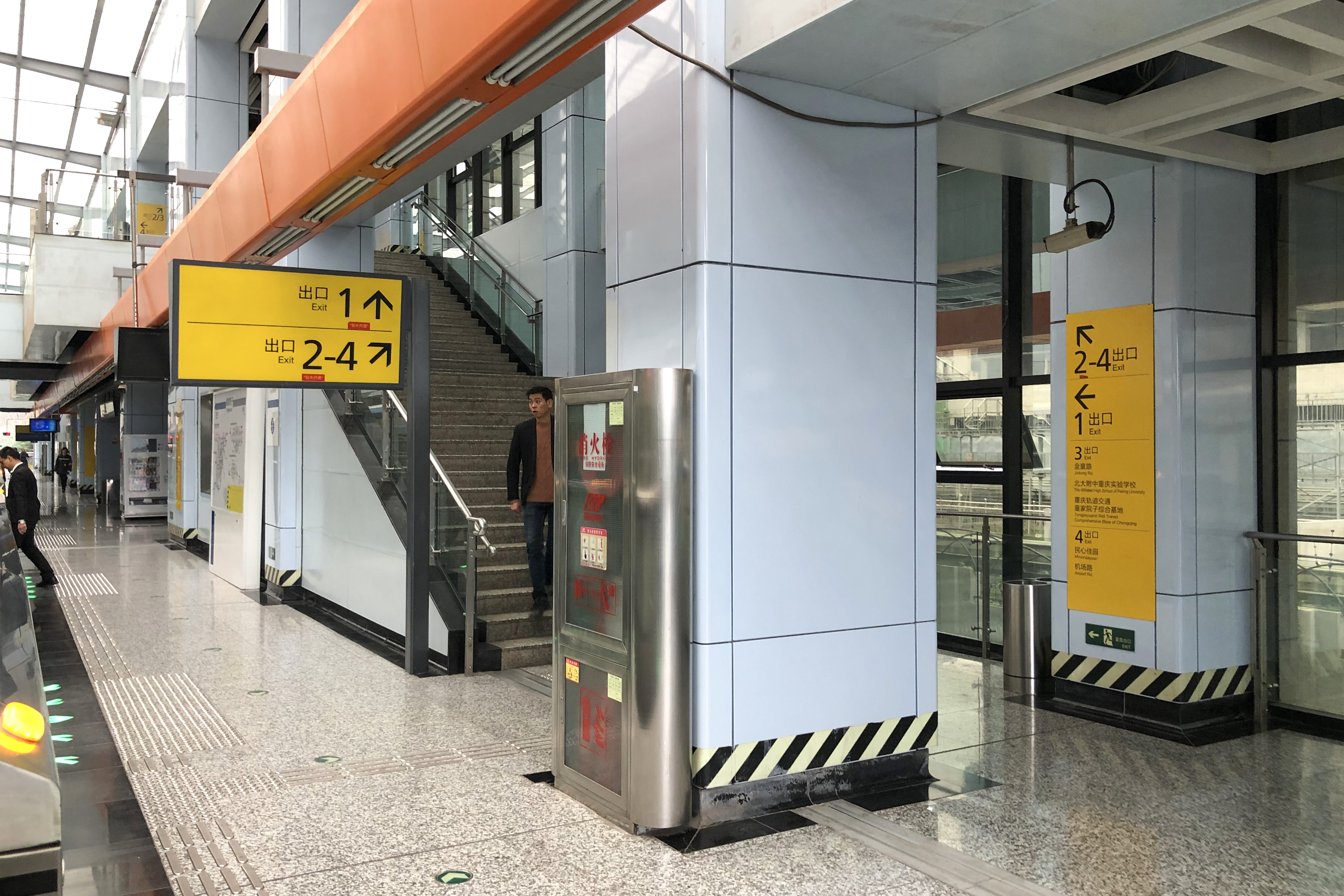

General information
- Location: Yubei District, Chongqing; China
- Operator: Chongqing Rail Transit Corp., Ltd
- Line: Line 3
- Platforms: 2 side platforms

Construction
- Structure type: At-grade

Other information
- Station code: 3/29

History
- Opened: 30 December 2011

Services
Preceding station	Chongqing Rail Transit	Following station
Longtousi towards Yudong	Line 3	Jinyu towards Terminal 2 of Jiangbei Airport
Location

Tongjiayuanzi is a station on Line 3 of Chongqing Rail Transit in Chongqing municipality, China. It is located in Yubei District. It opened as an infill station in 2011.

== Station structure ==
2F; Concourse	Exits 2, 3, Customer service
1F	Side platform
1F	Line 3 to Yudong (Longtousi)
1F	Line 3 to Terminal 2 of Jiangbei Airport (Jinyu)
1F	Side platform
1F	Concourse – Exits 1, 4, Customer service, Vending machines
