= Tongyuanju station =

Metro station in Chongqing, China

Tongyuanju 铜元局
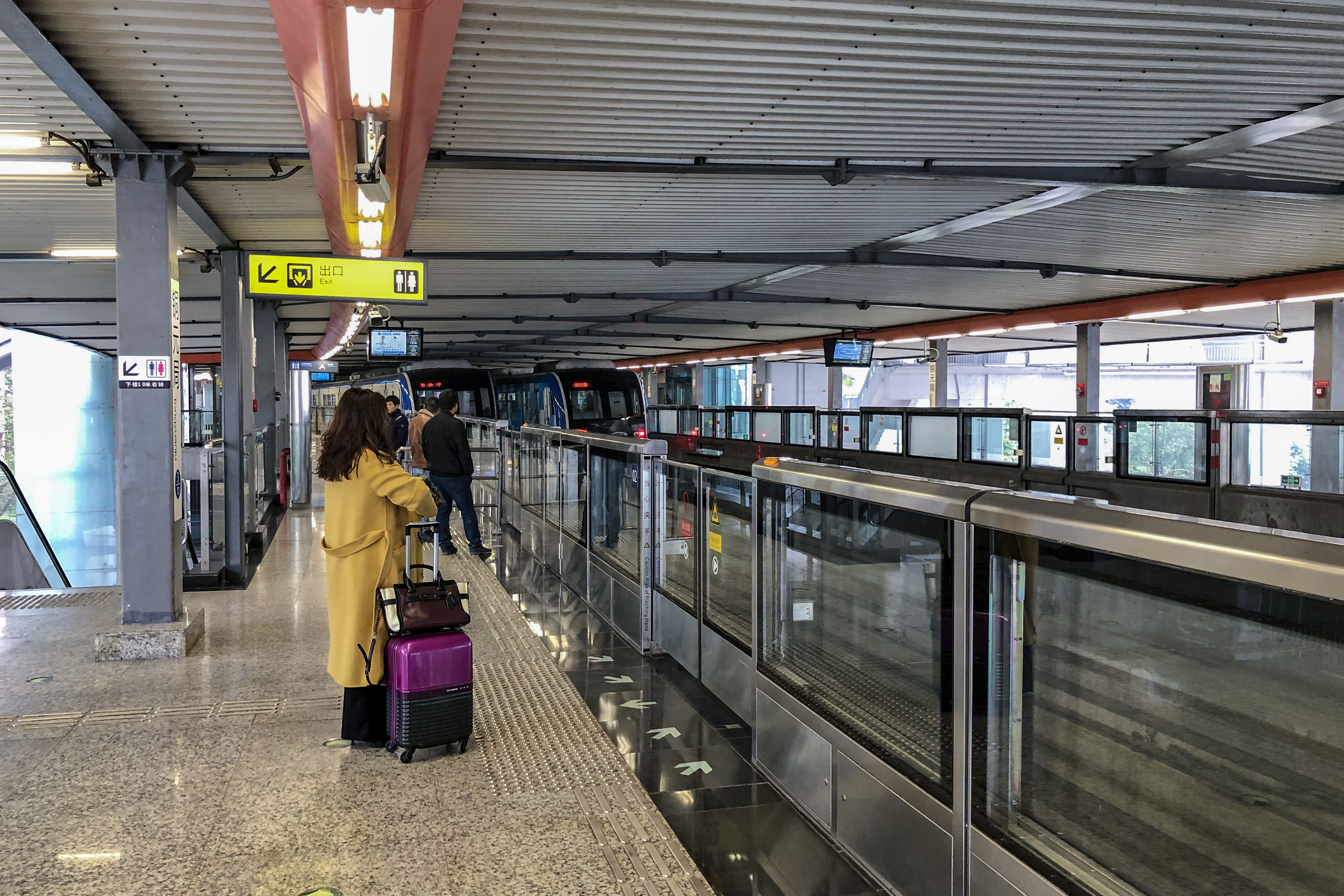
- Station platform

General information
- Location: Nan'an District, Chongqing; China
- Operated by: Chongqing Rail Transit Corp., Ltd
- Line: Line 3
- Platforms: 2 side platforms

Construction
- Structure type: Elevated

Other information
- Station code: 3/17

History
- Opened: 28 December 2012

Services
Preceding station	Chongqing Rail Transit	Following station
Gongmao towards Yudong	Line 3	Lianglukou towards Terminal 2 of Jiangbei Airport
Location

Tongyuanju is a station on Line 3 of Chongqing Rail Transit in Chongqing Municipality, China. It is located in Nan'an District. It opened as an infill station in 2012.

== Station structure ==
3F; Platforms	Side platform
3F; Platforms	Line 3 to Yudong (Gongmao)
3F; Platforms	Line 3 to Terminal 2 of Jiangbei Airport (Lianglukou)
3F; Platforms	Side platform
2F; Concourse	Exits, Customer service, Vending machines, Toilets
