= Gongmao station =

Metro station in Chongqing, China

Gongmao 工贸
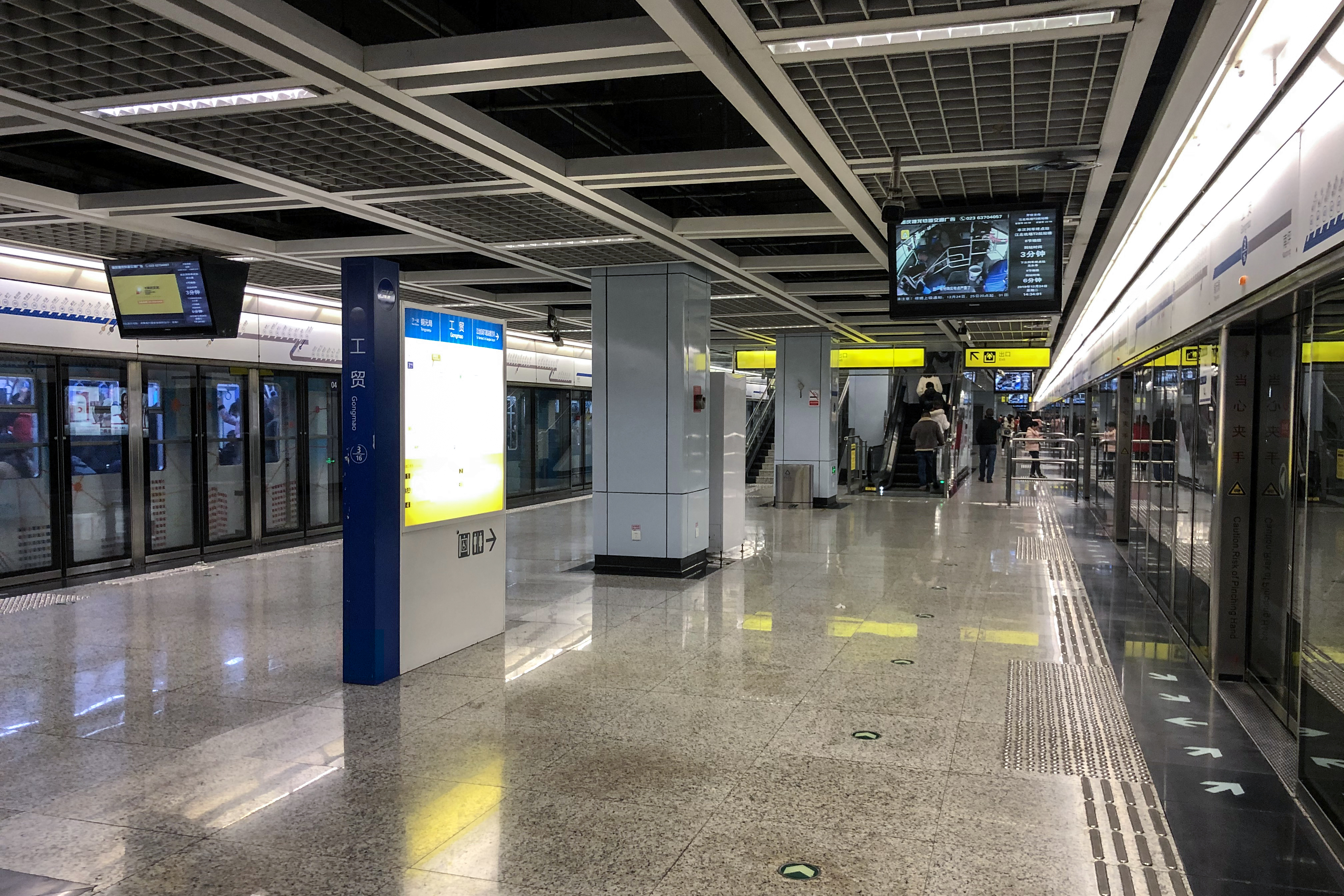
- Station platform

General information
- Location: Nan'an District, Chongqing; China
- Operated by: Chongqing Rail Transit Corp., Ltd
- Line: Line 3
- Platforms: 2 (1 island platform)

Construction
- Structure type: Underground

Other information
- Station code: 3/16

History
- Opened: 28 December 2012

Services
Preceding station	Chongqing Rail Transit	Following station
Nanping towards Yudong	Line 3	Tongyuanju towards Terminal 2 of Jiangbei Airport
Location

Gongmao is a station on Line 3 of Chongqing Rail Transit in Chongqing Municipality, China. It is located in Nan'an District. It opened as an infill station in 2012.

== Station structure ==
B1; Concourse	Exits, Customer service, Vending machines
B2; Platforms	Line 3 to Yudong (Nanping)
B2; Platforms	Island platform
B2; Platforms	Line 3 to Terminal 2 of Jiangbei Airport (Tongyuanju)
