= Line 3 (Chongqing Rail Transit) =

Monorail line of Chongqing Rail Transit

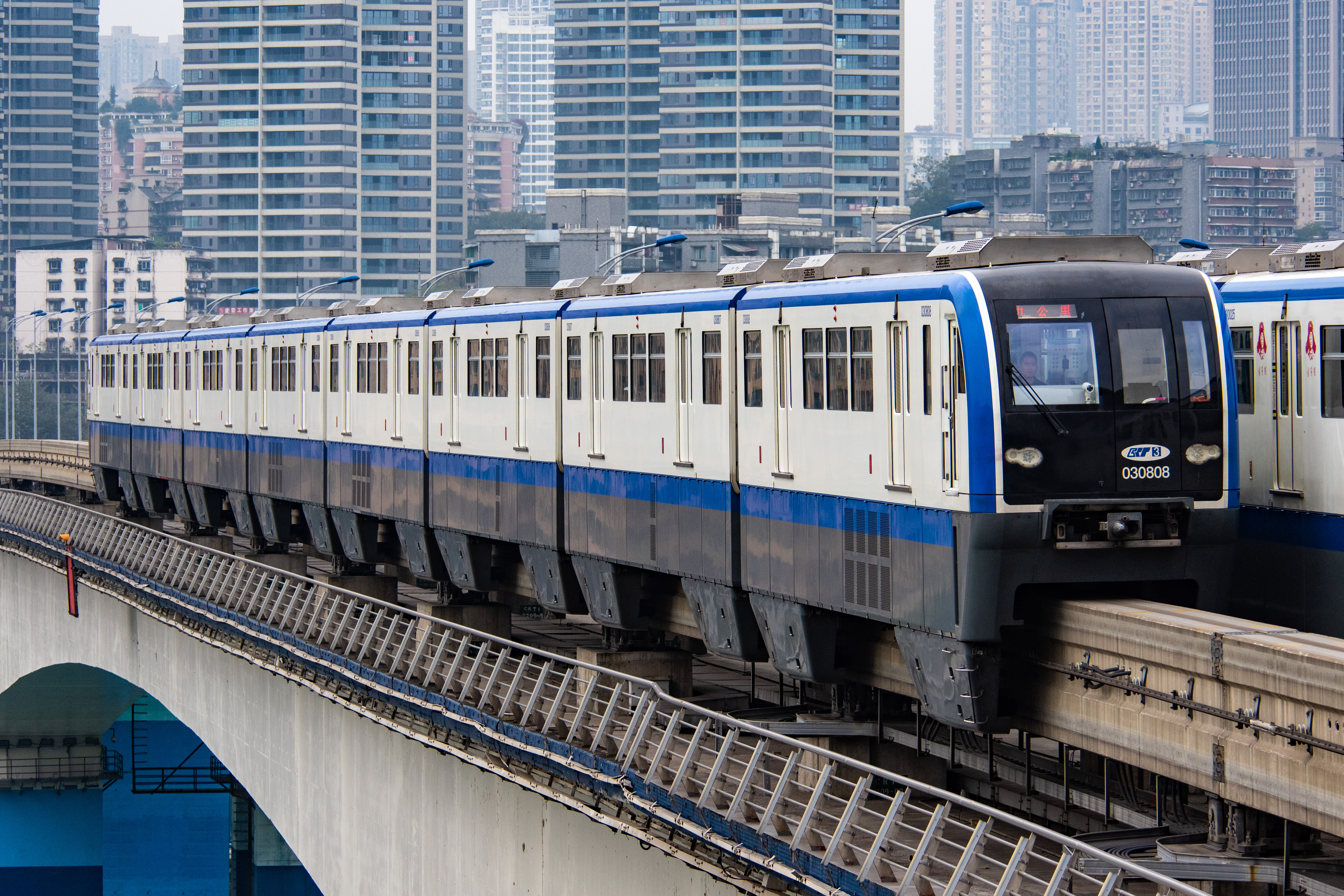
- Line 3 train crossing Jialing River

Overview
- Other name: Line 3b or Konggang line (空港线)
- Termini: Yudong / Bijin; Terminal 2 of Jiangbei Airport / Jurenba
- Stations: 45

Service
- Type: Straddle-beam monorail
- System: Chongqing Rail Transit
- Operator(s): Chongqing Rail Transit Corp., Ltd
- Daily ridership: 682,800 (2014 Daily Avg.); 1,080,000 (2016 Peak)

History
- Opened: 29 September 2011; 14 years ago

Technical
- Line length: 66 km (41 mi)
- Electrification: 1,500 V DC third rail

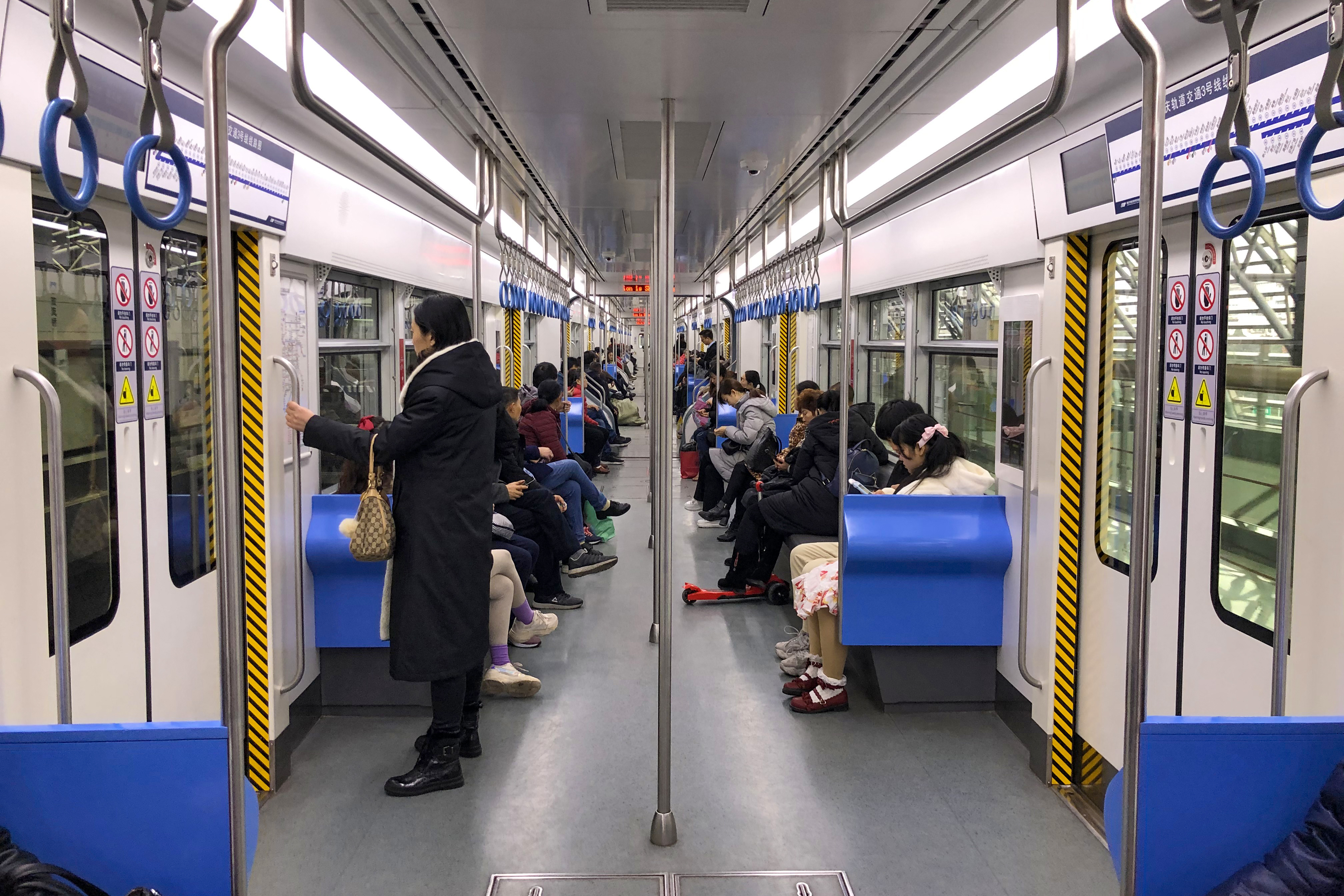
Interior of a Line 3 train showing its open gangway design

CRT Line 3 (and the branch line branded as Konggang line) runs from north to south, linking the districts separated by Chongqing's two main rivers, the Yangtze (Chang Jiang) and Jialing rivers. Built by Japan's ODA project, it uses Hitachi, Ltd. monorail vehicles and technology. The first phase of the line began construction on 5 April 2007. The initial segment from Lianglukou to Yuanyang (18 stations, 17.5 km (10.9 mi)) opened on September 29, 2011, with a northern extension from Yuanyang to Jiangbei Airport opening on December 30, 2011 and a southern extension from Ertang (Currently Chongqing Jiaotong University) to terminus Yudong on December 28, 2012. At 55.5 km (34.5 mi), plus 9.97 km (6.20 mi) for Konggang branch line opened on December 28, 2016, Line 3 is the longest single monorail in the world by track length. Line 3 is also the world's busiest monorail line with a daily ridership of over 675,000 passengers per day.

There are interchange stations in central Yuzhong district for transfer to Jiefangbei CBD with Line 1 at Lianglukou and with Line 2 at Niujiaotuo.

== Opening timeline ==
Segment	Commencement	Length	Station(s)	Name
Lianglukou – Yuanyang	29 September 2011	17.323 km (10.76 mi)	11	Phase 1 & 2 (initial section)
Yuanyang – Changfulu	8 October 2011	4.9 km (3.04 mi)	3	Phase 2 (2nd section)
Chongqing Jiaotong University – Lianglukou	30 December 2011	8.66 km (5.38 mi)	5	Phase 1 (final section)
Changfulu – Terminal 2 of Jiangbei Airport	30 December 2011	6.9 km (4.29 mi)	4	Phase 2 (final section)
Tongjiayuanzi	30 December 2011	Infill station	1	
Hongqihegou	1 March 2012	Infill station	1	
Zhengjiayuanzi	1 May 2012	Infill station	1	
Yudong – Chongqing Jiaotong University	28 December 2012	16.197 km (10.06 mi)	7	Southern extension
Gongmao, Tongyuanju	28 December 2012	Infill stations	2	
Jinzhu, Huaxi, Chalukou	31 January 2013	Infill stations	3	
Longtousi	5 February 2013	Infill station	1	
Bijin – Jurenba	28 December 2016	11.0 km (6.84 mi)	6	Konggang line

== Service routes ==
Route of Line 3
- Yudong – Terminal 2 of Jiangbei Airport
- Yudong → Longtousi (shown as "↓" below)
- Terminal 2 of Jiangbei Airport → Xuetangwan/Longtousi (shown as "↑" below)
- Bijin – Jurenba (6-car trains only)

== Current stations ==
Service routes					Station No.	Station name		Connections	Distance km		Location
		Last train			Station No.	Station name		Connections	Distance km		Location
		↓	↑		Station No.	English	Chinese	Connections	Distance km		Location
●		●			/	Yudong	鱼洞	Line 2	-	0.00	Ba'nan
●		●			/	Jinzhu	金竹		1.95	1.95	Ba'nan
●		●			/	Yuhulu	鱼胡路		1.65	3.60	Ba'nan
●		●	●		/	Xuetangwan	学堂湾		2.25	5.85	Ba'nan
●		●	●		/	Dashancun	大山村		1.65	7.50	Ba'nan
●		●	●		/	Huaxi	花溪		2.30	9.80	Ba'nan
●		●	●		/	Chalukou	岔路口		1.90	11.70	Ba'nan
●		●	●		/	Jiugongli	九公里		1.20	12.90	Ba'nan
●		●	●		/	Qilong	麒龙		1.00	13.90	Ba'nan
●		●	●		/	Bagongli	八公里		1.35	15.25	Ba'nan
●		●	●		/	Chongqing Jiaotong University	重庆交通大学		1.35	16.60	Nan'an
●		●	●		/	Liugongli	六公里		1.05	17.65	Nan'an
●		●	●		/	Chongqing Technology and Business University	重庆工商大学		1.05	18.70	Nan'an
●		●	●		/	Sigongli	四公里	Loop line	1.05	19.75	Nan'an
●		●	●		/	Nanping	南坪	10 27	1.30	21.05	Nan'an
●		●	●		/	Gongmao	工贸		2.25	23.30	Nan'an
●		●	●		/	Tongyuanju	铜元局		1.30	24.60	Nan'an
●		●	●		/	Lianglukou	两路口	Line 1 CQW	1.85	26.45	Yuzhong
●		●	●		/	Niujiaotuo	牛角沱	Line 2	1.05	27.50	Yuzhong
●		●	●		/	Huaxinjie	华新街		0.85	28.35	Liangjiang
●		●	●		/	Guanyinqiao	观音桥	Line 9 (Note: Out of system transfers)	1.15	29.50	Liangjiang
●		●	●		/	Hongqihegou	红旗河沟	Line 6	1.50	31.00	Liangjiang
●		●	●		/	Jiazhoulu	嘉州路	4	1.20	32.20	Liangjiang
●		●	●		/	Zhengjiayuanzi	郑家院子		1.30	33.50	Liangjiang
●		●	●		/	Tangjiayuanzi	唐家院子		1.00	34.50	Liangjiang
●		●	●		/	Shiziping	狮子坪		1.05	35.55	Liangjiang
●		●	●		/	Chongqing N. Station S. Square (Note: The former English translation is South Square of Chongqingbei Railway Station, which has been replaced since the opening of Line 10's station)	重庆北站南广场	Line 10 Loop line YW CUW	0.60	36.15	Liangjiang
●		●	●	●	/	Longtousi	龙头寺		1.15	37.30	Liangjiang
●			●	●	/	Tongjiayuanzi	童家院子		1.60	38.90	Liangjiang
●			●	●	/	Jinyu	金渝		1.65	40.55	Liangjiang
●			●	●	/	Jintonglu	金童路	15	1.20	41.75	Liangjiang
●			●	●	/	Yuanyang	鸳鸯		2.25	44.00	Liangjiang
●			●	●	/	The EXPO Garden	园博园		1.55	45.55	Liangjiang
●			●	●	/	Cuiyun	翠云		1.50	47.05	Liangjiang
●			●	●	/	Changfulu	长福路		1.70	48.75	Liangjiang
●			●	●	/	Huixing	回兴		1.90	50.65	Liangjiang
●			●	●	/	Shuanglong	双龙		1.55	52.20	Liangjiang
●	●		●	●	/	Bijin	碧津		2.10	54.30	Liangjiang
●			●	●	/	Terminal 2 of Jiangbei Airport	江北机场T2航站楼	Line 10 CKG	1.40	55.70	Liangjiang
Northern extension (also known as Konggang branch)
	●				/	Shuangfengqiao	双凤桥		2.00	57.70	Liangjiang
	●				/	Konggang Square	空港广场		0.90	58.6	Liangjiang
	●				/	Gaobaohu	高堡湖		2.05	60.65	Liangjiang
	●				/	Guanyuelu	观月路		2.80	63.45	Liangjiang
	●				/	Lianhua	莲花		1.20	64.65	Liangjiang
	●				/	Jurenba	举人坝		1.60	66.25	Liangjiang
