= Huixing station =

Railway station in Chongqing, China

Huixing 回兴
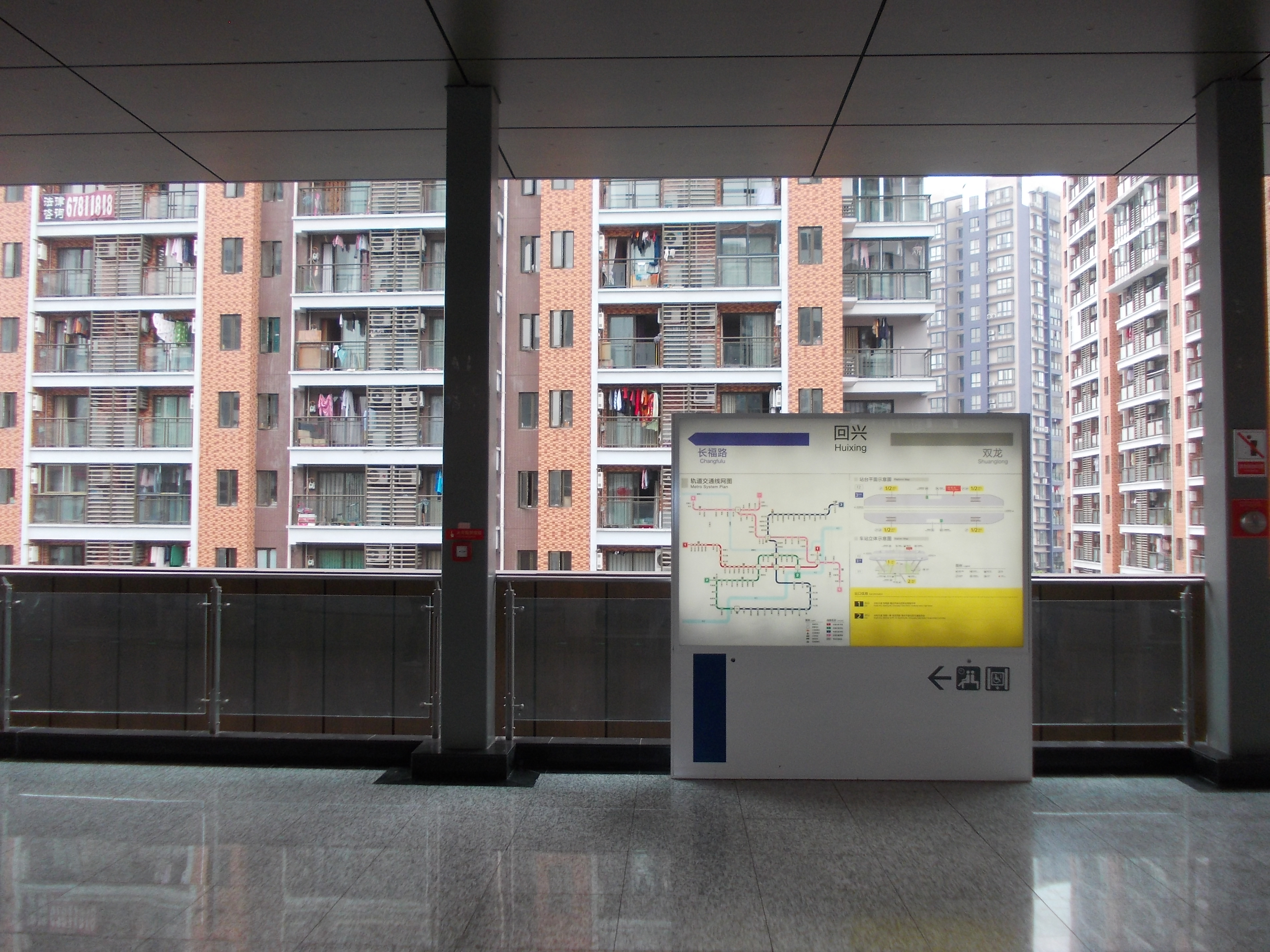

General information
- Location: Yubei District, Chongqing; China
- Coordinates: 29.6931°N 106.6020°E
- Operator: Chongqing Rail Transit Corp., Ltd
- Line: Line 3
- Platforms: 2 side platforms

Construction
- Structure type: Elevated

Other information
- Station code: 3/36

History
- Opened: 30 December 2011

Services
Preceding station	Chongqing Rail Transit	Following station
Changfulu towards Yudong	Line 3	Shuanglong towards Terminal 2 of Jiangbei Airport
Location

Huixing (Chinese: 回兴站; pinyin: Huíxīng zhàn) is a station on Line 3 of Chongqing Rail Transit in Chongqing Municipality, China. It is located in Yubei District. It opened in 2011.

== Station structure ==
3F; Platforms	Side platform
3F; Platforms	Line 3 to Yudong (Changfulu)
3F; Platforms	Line 3 to Terminal 2 of Jiangbei Airport (Shuanglong)
3F; Platforms	Side platform
2F; Concourse	Exits, Customer service, Vending machines, Toilets

== Nearby station ==
- Xingke Ave. station on Line 9: 400 meters (5 minute walking time) from this station.
