= Jiang Shufang =

Jiang Shufang (Chinese: 江漱芳, 1867-1928) was a Chinese school pioneer.

She belonged to a rich family but was forced to support her spouse, his parents and children alone because her husband refused to work. In 1897 sold her jewelry and founded the Lanling Girls School in Suzhou, which she managed until 1920: it was the first school for girls in that part of the country and became a role model for other schools for girls, which became more common in China around the year 1900. She was also known as an advocate against foot binding.

== See also ==
- Huixing (educator)
