= Huixing (educator) =

Chinese school pioneer and women's rights activist

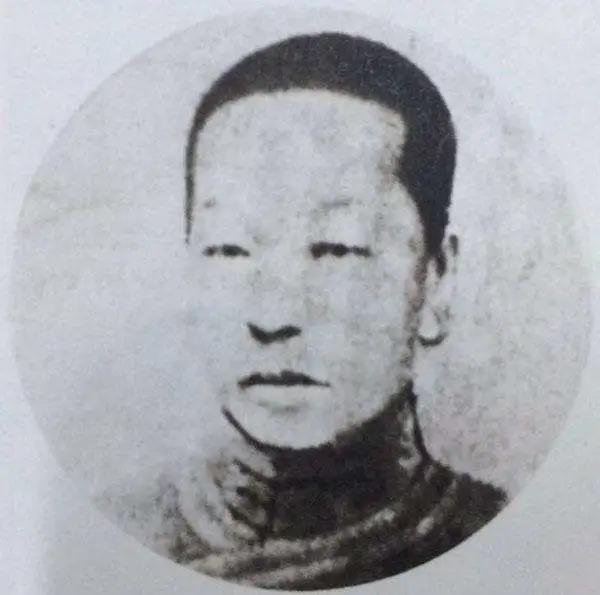
惠兴女士像

Huixing (Chinese: 惠興, 1871–1905) was a Qing dynasty school pioneer and women's rights activist. She was an ethnic Manchu from the Gūwalgiya clan.

She was the daughter of a Manchu officer and the wife of another, but became a pregnant widow in 1889. Huixing was a passionate advocate for modern reform education as a solution to the crisis of her contemporary China, particularly for girls, who at that time could not only get such an education at the Western missionary schools as they were very few Chinese schools for girls. She collected funds for the foundation of such a school and founded the pioneer Zhenwen Girls' School in Hangzhou in 1904. When the money ran out and she was denied government funds, the school was closed and she committed suicide. Her suicide out of despair for the lack of women's education in China became famous and contributed to a flood of enthusiasm for the foundation of private girls' schools in China.

== See also ==
- Jiang Shufang
