= Bijin station =

Metro station in Chongqing, China

Bijin 碧津
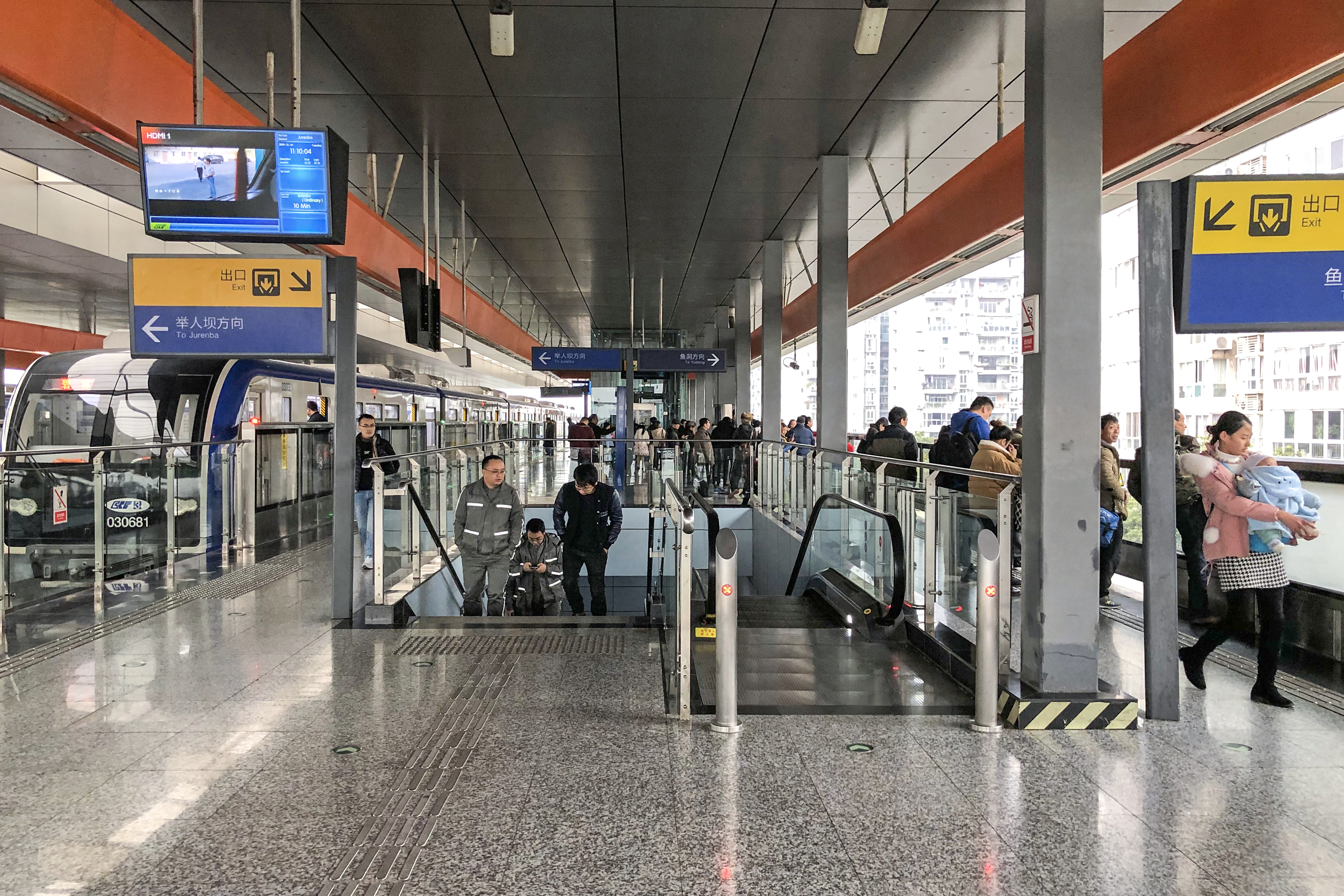

General information
- Location: Yubei District, Chongqing; China
- Coordinates: 29.713948°N 106.628807°E
- Operator: Chongqing Rail Transit Corp., Ltd
- Line: Line 3
- Platforms: 4 (2 island platforms)

Construction
- Structure type: Elevated

Other information
- Station code: /

History
- Opened: 30 December 2011; 14 years ago (Main line); 28 December 2016; 9 years ago (Konggang branch)

Services
| Preceding station | Chongqing Rail Transit | Following station |
|---|---|---|
| Shuanglong towards Yudong | Line 3 | Terminal 2 of Jiangbei Airport Terminus |
| Terminus | Line 3 Konggang branch | Shuangfengqiao towards Jurenba |
Location

Bijin is a station on Line 3 of Chongqing Rail Transit in Chongqing Municipality, China, which opened in 2011. It is located in Yubei District. The station also serves as the southern terminus of the Konggang Branch of Line 3.

== Station structure ==
There are 2 island platforms at this station. The 2 outer tracks are used for the main line of Line 3, while the 2 inner tracks are used for Konggang branch. Nevertheless, due to the fact that trains of Konggang Branch switch beam (monorail tracks) from left to right just before leaving the station for the opposite direction (towards Jurenba), only one side of the inner tracks is used and the other side is reserved for through operation from the main line. But there are also few main line trains returning to Huanchengbeilu depot (connected with Guanyuelu station) via the reserved track at night.

| 3F; Platforms | Line 3 to Yudong (Shuanglong) |
| 3F; Platforms | Island platform |
| 3F; Platforms | Line 3 – Konggang branch to Jurenba (Shuangfengqiao) |
| 3F; Platforms | Line 3 – Konggang branch reserved platform |
| 3F; Platforms | Island platform |
| 3F; Platforms | Line 3 to Terminal 2 of Jiangbei Airport (Terminus) |
| 2F; Concourse | Customer service, Toilets |
| 1F; Concourse | Exits, Vending machines |
