= Jurenba station =

Chongqing Rail Transit station

Jurenba 举人坝
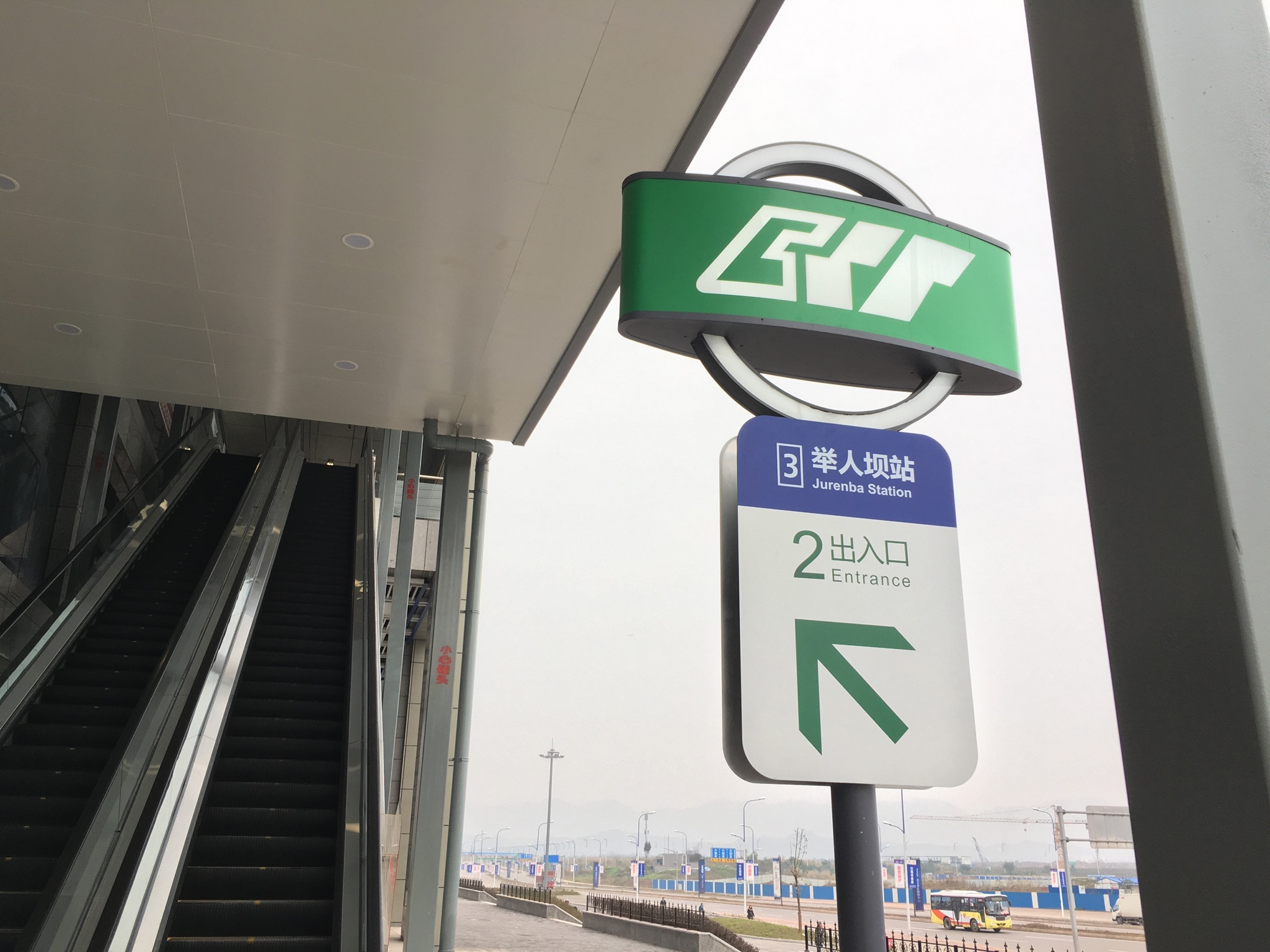

General information
- Location: Chongqing; China
- Coordinates: 29.7942°N 106.6635°E
- Operator: Chongqing Rail Transit Corp., Ltd
- Line: Line 3 (Konggang Branch)
- Platforms: 2 side platforms

Construction
- Structure type: Elevated

Other information
- Station code: /

History
- Opened: 28 December 2016; 9 years ago

Services
Preceding station	Chongqing Rail Transit	Following station
Lianhua towards Bijin	Line 3 Konggang branch	Terminus
Location

Jurenba Station is a station on Line 3 of Chongqing Rail Transit in Chongqing municipality, China. It also serves as the northernmost station of Line 3. It is located in Yubei District and opened in 2016.

== Station structure ==
4F; Platforms	Side platform
4F; Platforms	Line 3 – Konggang branch to Bijin (Lianhua)
4F; Platforms	Line 3 – Konggang branch termination platform
4F; Platforms	Side platform
3F; Concourse	Exit 2, Customer service, Vending machines, Toilets
2F; Concourse
1F	Exit 1
