= Terminal 2 of Jiangbei Airport station =

Metro station in Chongqing, China

Terminal 2 of Jiangbei Airport 江北机场T2航站楼
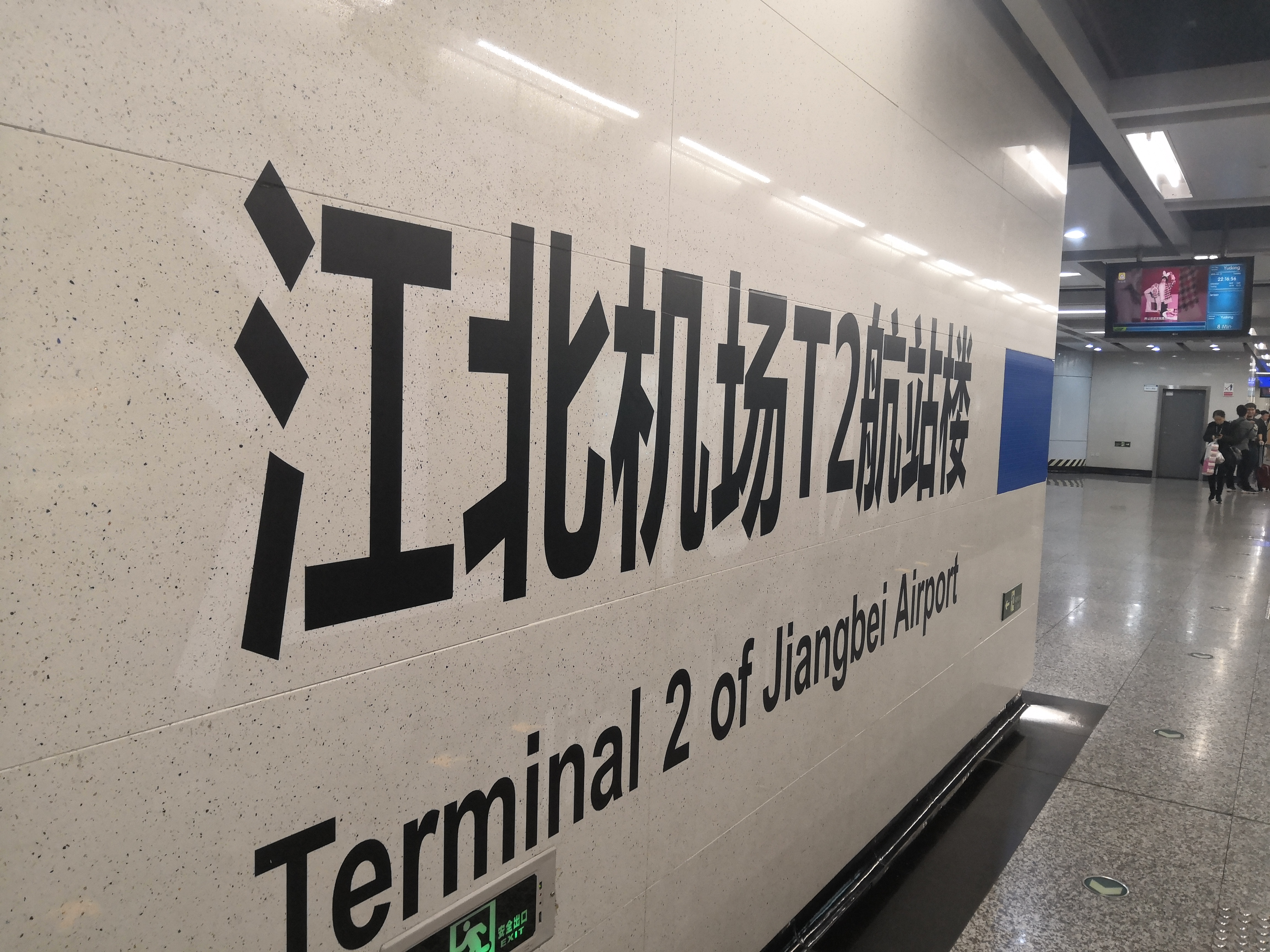
- Platform of Line 3

General information
- Location: Chongqing; China
- Operator: Chongqing Rail Transit Corp., Ltd
- Lines: Line 3 Line 10
- Platforms: 4 (2 side platforms and 1 island platform)
- Connections: Chongqing Jiangbei International Airport (Terminal 2); Terminal 2 Long Distance Bus Station

Construction
- Structure type: Underground
- Accessible: 5 accessible elevators

Other information
- Station code: / /

History
- Opened: 30 December 2011; 14 years ago (Line 3); 28 December 2017; 8 years ago (Line 10)
- Former names: Jiangbei Airport

Services
Preceding station	Chongqing Rail Transit	Following station
Bijin towards Yudong	Line 3	Terminus
Terminal 3 of Jiangbei Airport towards Lanhualu	Line 10	Yubei Square towards Wangjiazhuang
Terminal 3 of Jiangbei Airport towards Lanhualu	Line 10 Rapid	Wangjiazhuang Terminus
Location

Terminal 2 of Jiangbei Airport, previously known simply as Jiangbei Airport, is an interchange station of Line 3 (straddle beam monorail) and Line 10 (heavy rail subway) of Chongqing Rail Transit in Liangjiang, Chongqing Municipality, China. The station opened in 2011 with Line 3 and was expanded in 2017 with Line 10, alongside changing to its current name to differentiate itself from the station at Terminal 3A of the airport.

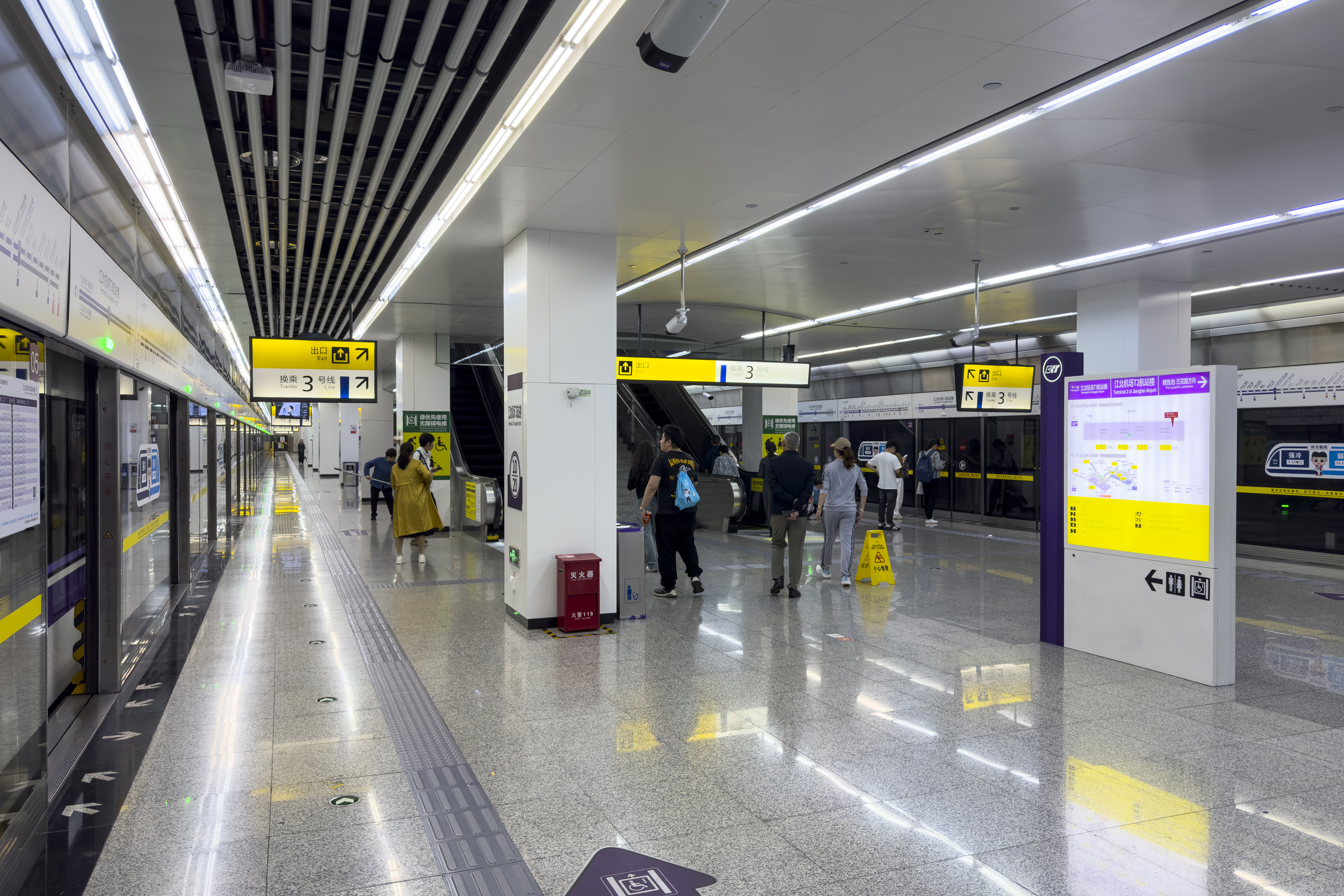
Platform of Line 10

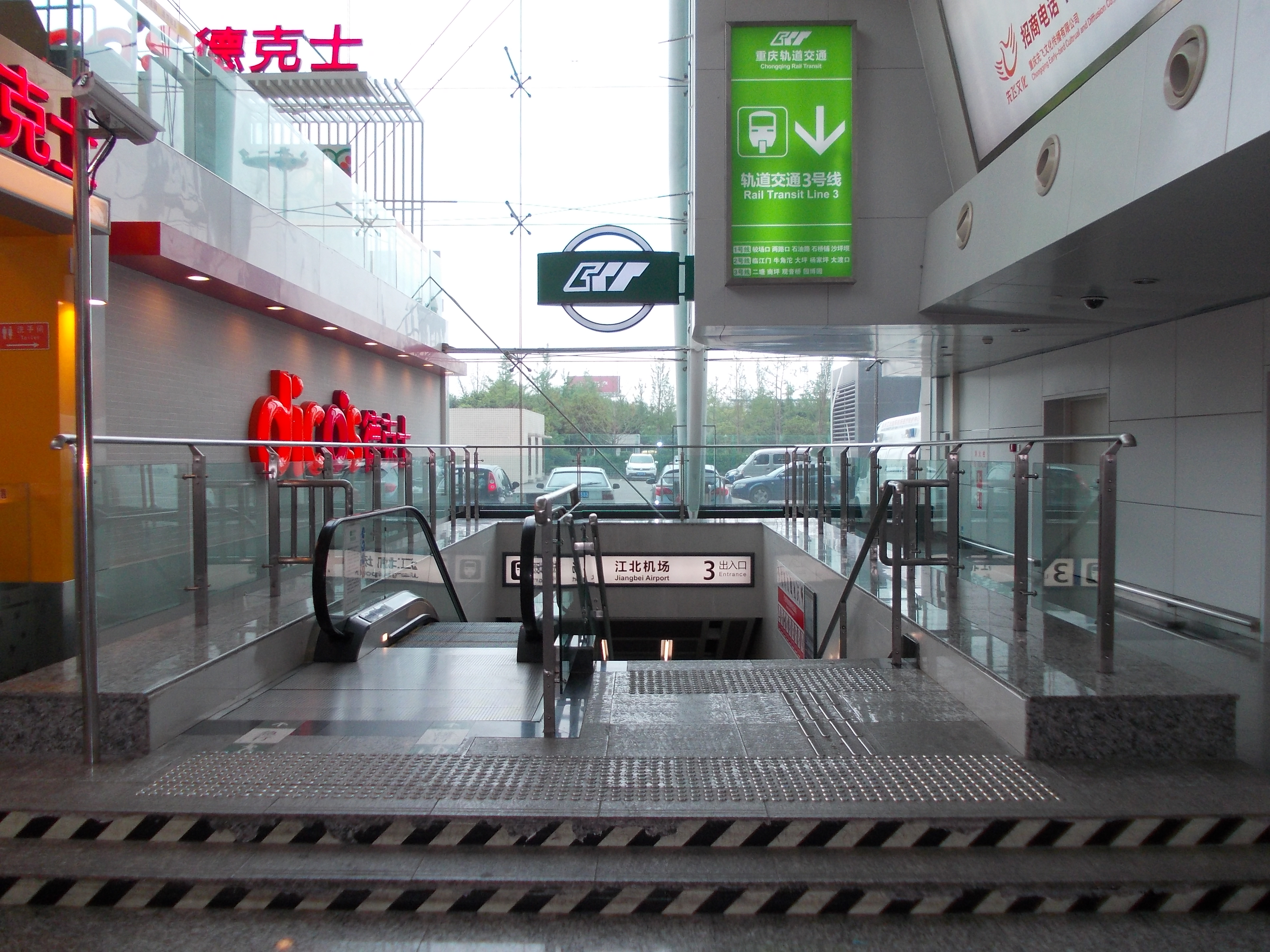
Exit 3 of the station is connected to the interiors of Terminal 2B of the airport

It serves the airport terminals in which the station's name derived from (Terminals 2A & 2B of Chongqing Jiangbei International Airport) and its surrounding area, including Terminal 1 before its temporary closure since 2017.

== Station structure ==
=== Line 3 ===
There are 2 side platforms for Line 3 trains. Only 1 platform is in use as the station is the terminal station for North-bound trains. These trains switch beam (monorail tracks) from right to left before entering the station and stopping at the platform for South-bound trains, where they would terminate. Trains then let south-bound passengers board and would head for that direction (towards Yudong).

B1; Concourse	Exits 1-4, Customer service, Vending machines, Transfer passage to Line 10
B2; Platforms	Side platform
B2; Platforms	Line 3 to Yudong (Bijin)
B2; Platforms	Track not in use
B2; Platforms	Side platform (not in use)

=== Line 10 ===
An island platform is used for Line 10 trains travelling in both directions.

B1; Concourse	Exits 5-7, Customer service, Vending machines, Transfer passage to Line 3
B2; Platforms	Line 10 to Wangjiazhuang (Yubei Square)
B2; Platforms	Island platform
B2; Platforms	Line 10 to Lanhualu (Terminal 3 of Jiangbei Airport)

== Exits ==
There are a total of 8 entrances/exits for the station.

Exit	To
1	Car park
2	Terminal 1 (temporarily closed), VIP Service Area C
3	Domestic Arrivals A, Domestic Arrivals B, Long distance buses
4	Domestic Departures, Airport buses, Taxis, the Airport Cargo Terminal, VIP Service Areas A & B
5	Car park
6A	Long distance buses, Domestic Arrivals A, Domestic Departures, Airport buses, Taxis
6B	Long distance buses, Domestic Arrivals B, Domestic Departures, Airport buses, Taxis
7	Jinhang Road, Binggang Road, Yixue Road, The People's Government of Chongqing Yubei District

== Surroundings ==
- Chongqing Jiangbei International Airport
- Terminal 3 of Jiangbei Airport station (a Line 10 Station)

== See also ==
- Chongqing Jiangbei International Airport
- Chongqing Rail Transit (CRT)
- Line 3 (CRT)
- Line 10 (CRT)
