= Jinzhu =

Jinzhu may refer to the following locations in China:

- Jinzhu, Sichuan (金珠镇; Jīnzhū Zhèn), in Daocheng County, Garzê Tibetan Autonomous Prefecture, Sichuan
- Jinzhu, Zhejiang (金竹镇; Jīnzhú Zhèn), in Suichang County
- Jinzhu Township, Chongqing (金竹乡; Jīnzhú Xiāng), in Shizhu Tujia Autonomous County
- Jinzhu Township, Jilin (金珠乡; Jīnzhū Xiāng), in Longtan District, Jilin City
- Jinzhu Subdistrict (金竹街道; Jīnzhú Jiēdào), Xiaohe District, Guiyang, Guizhou
- Jinzhu, Guangxi (筋竹镇; Jīnzhú Zhèn), in Cenxi
- Jinzhu, Huitong (金竹镇), a town of Huitong County, Hunan.
- Jinzhu Station (金竹站; Jīnzhú Zhàn), on Line 3 of Chongqing Rail Transit
