= Shengmu =

Shengmu may refer to:

- Shengmu (聖母), a goddess in Chinese folk religion, see Chinese folk religion § Mother goddess worship
  - Queen Mother of the West or Wuji Shengmu
  - Mazu or Tianshang Shengmu
  - Chen Jinggu or Shuntian Shengmu
  - Jinling Shengmu
  - Huayue Sanniang or San Shengmu
- Shengmu (聖母), an honorific title for the mother of an emperor, see Empress dowager § Chinese empresses dowager
  - a title of Wu Zetian
- Shengmu (聖母), a title of the Blessed Virgin in Chinese Christianity
- in Chinese internet slang, a sarcastic, possibly pejorative term for "bleeding-heart" politically correct women, see Baizuo
- Shengmu Township (省母乡), in Daocheng County, Sichuan, China

== See also ==
- Mother goddess
- Holy Mother (disambiguation)
