= Yuhulu station =

Metro station in Chongqing, China

Yuhulu 鱼胡路
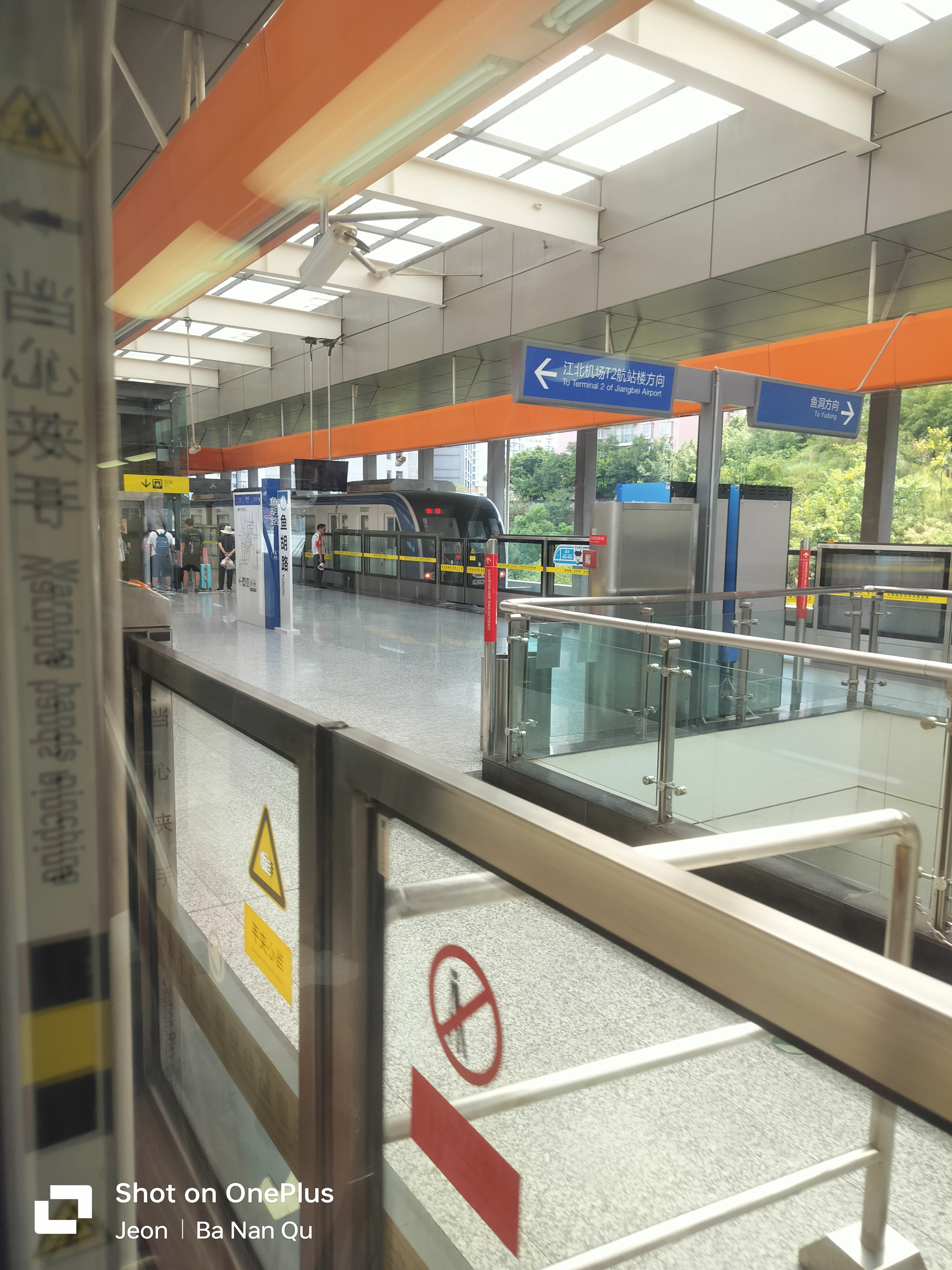

General information
- Location: Chongqing; China
- Coordinates: 29.3805°N 106.5354°E
- Operated by: Chongqing Rail Transit Corp., Ltd
- Line(s): Line 3
- Platforms: 2 (1 island platform)

Construction
- Structure type: Elevated

Other information
- Station code: 3/03

History
- Opened: 28 December 2012

Services
Preceding station	Chongqing Rail Transit	Following station
Jinzhu towards Yudong	Line 3	Xuetangwan towards Terminal 2 of Jiangbei Airport

Yuhulu is a station on Line 3 of Chongqing Rail Transit in Chongqing Municipality, China. It is located in Banan District. It opened in 2012.

== Station structure ==
3F; Platforms	Line 3 to Yudong (Jinzhu)
3F; Platforms	Island platform
3F; Platforms	Line 3 to Terminal 2 of Jiangbei Airport (Xuetangwan)
2F; Concourse	Exits, Customer service, Vending machines, Toilets
