= Banan, Chongqing =

Coordinates: 29°15′27.54″N 106°41′37.41″E

Banan 巴南区
- District
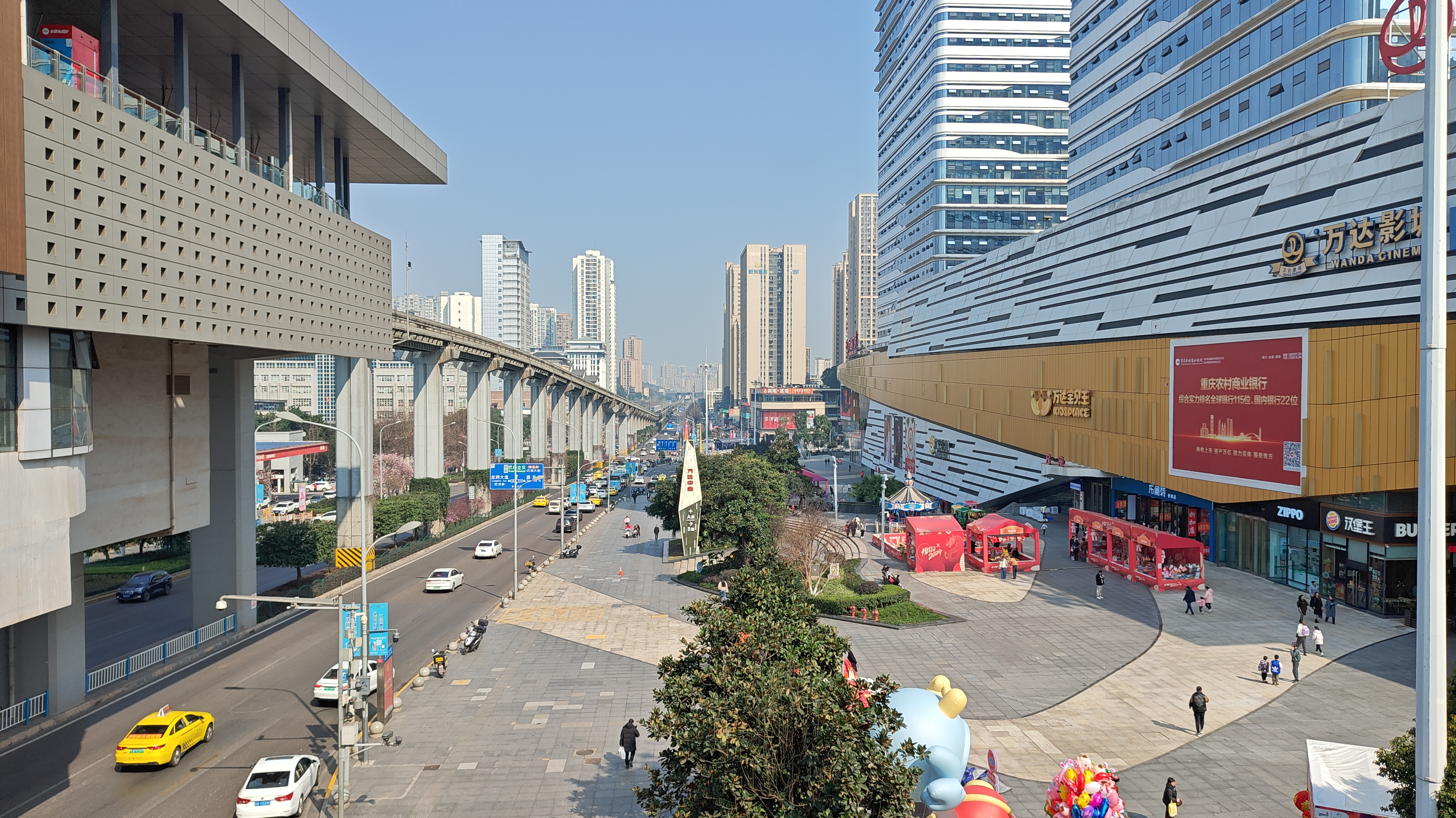
- Yunan Avenue in 2024
- Interactive map of Banan
- Country: People's Republic of China
- Municipality: Chongqing

Area
  - District: 1,823 km^{2} (704 sq mi)

Population (2020 census)
  - District: 1,178,856
  - Density: 646.7/km^{2} (1,675/sq mi)
  - Urban: 977,464 (83%)
  - Rural: 201,392 (17%)
- Time zone: UTC+8 (China Standard)

Banan District (Chinese: 巴南区; pinyin: Bānán Qū), formerly Ba County, is a district of Chongqing municipality.

== Geography and climate ==
Banan, situated in the southern part of the Sichuan Basin, has a diversity of terrains including mountains, hills, wetlands and flood beds. The lowest point of the district is on its northern border with Nan'an District, at an altitude of 154 meters. The highest point is the top of Fangdou Mountain in the southeast of the district, at an altitude of 1132.6 meters.

The climate of Banan is humid subtropical climate, typically found in Southern China and characterized by hot and humid summers, and mild winters. The average temperature of the year is 18.7 Celsius degrees, but sometimes the temperature can get as low as -1 degree in winter and as high as 41 degrees in summer. The annual precipitation of Banan usually fluctuates between 1000 and 1200 millimeters, with abundant rainfall from May to July.

== Administrative divisions ==
Name	Chinese (S)	Hanyu Pinyin	Population (2010)	Area (km^{2})
Longzhouwan Subdistrict	龙洲湾街道	Lóngzhōuwān Jiēdào	42,786	39.5
Yudong Subdistrict	鱼洞街道	Yúdòng Jiēdào	171,363	55.6
Huaxi Subdistrict	花溪街道	Huāxī Jiēdào	130,637	47.61
Lijiatuo Subdistrict	李家沱街道	Lǐjiātuó Jiēdào	89,213	4.25
Nanquan Subdistrict	南泉街道	Nánquán Jiēdào	53,056	84.26
Yipin Subdistrict	一品街道	YīpǐnJiēdào	21,648	58.9
Nanpen Subdistrict	南彭街道	Nánpéng Jiēdào	46,786	126.9
Huimin Subdistrict	惠民街道	Huìmín Jiēdào	23,017	63.21
Jieshi town	界石镇	Jièshí Zhèn	47,636	64.13
Anlan town	安澜镇	Ānlán Zhèn	31,546	122.42
Tiaoshi town	跳石镇	Tiàoshí Zhèn	28,825	136
Mudong town	木洞镇	Mùdòn Zhèn	36,704	104.3
Shuanghekou town	双河口镇	Shuānghékǒu Zhèn	12,739	60.45
Maliuzui town	麻柳嘴镇	Máliǔzuǐ Zhèn	18,847	79.34
Fengsheng town	丰盛镇	Fēngshèng Zhèn	13,649	69
Ersheng town	二圣镇	Èrshèng Zhèn	16,461	60
Dongquan town	东泉镇	Dōngquán Zhèn	29,134	122.7
Jiangjia town	姜家镇	Jiāngjiā Zhèn	16,518	80.36
Tianxingsi town	天星寺镇	Tiānxīngsì Zhèn	8,383	46.1
Jielong town	接龙镇	Jiēlóng Zhèn	48,018	188.15
Shitan town	石滩镇	Shítān Zhèn	11,295	52.09
Shilong town	石龙镇	Shílóng Zhèn	20,431	106.31

== Climate ==
Climate data for Banan, elevation 506 m (1,660 ft), (1991–2020 normals, extremes 1981–present)
Month	Jan	Feb	Mar	Apr	May	Jun	Jul	Aug	Sep	Oct	Nov	Dec	Year
Record high °C (°F)	18.9 (66.0)	25.3 (77.5)	34.6 (94.3)	36.4 (97.5)	38.6 (101.5)	39.3 (102.7)	41.5 (106.7)	43.9 (111.0)	43.8 (110.8)	35.9 (96.6)	29.5 (85.1)	19.6 (67.3)	43.9 (111.0)
Mean daily maximum °C (°F)	8.8 (47.8)	11.7 (53.1)	17.4 (63.3)	22.8 (73.0)	25.4 (77.7)	27.9 (82.2)	32.3 (90.1)	33.0 (91.4)	25.6 (78.1)	20.2 (68.4)	15.2 (59.4)	9.7 (49.5)	20.8 (69.5)
Daily mean °C (°F)	6.7 (44.1)	8.8 (47.8)	13.6 (56.5)	18.4 (65.1)	21.1 (70.0)	24.0 (75.2)	27.7 (81.9)	27.9 (82.2)	22.2 (72.0)	17.5 (63.5)	12.9 (55.2)	7.7 (45.9)	17.4 (63.3)
Mean daily minimum °C (°F)	5.3 (41.5)	6.8 (44.2)	11.0 (51.8)	15.4 (59.7)	18.1 (64.6)	21.4 (70.5)	24.3 (75.7)	24.2 (75.6)	20 (68)	15.6 (60.1)	11.4 (52.5)	6.3 (43.3)	15.0 (59.0)
Record low °C (°F)	−1.7 (28.9)	−1.0 (30.2)	1.5 (34.7)	6.8 (44.2)	8.7 (47.7)	15.2 (59.4)	19.2 (66.6)	18.7 (65.7)	14.3 (57.7)	7.9 (46.2)	2.4 (36.3)	−1.6 (29.1)	−1.7 (28.9)
Average precipitation mm (inches)	25.2 (0.99)	18.8 (0.74)	66.4 (2.61)	109.7 (4.32)	172.9 (6.81)	227.0 (8.94)	149.8 (5.90)	102.6 (4.04)	170.2 (6.70)	113.4 (4.46)	58.6 (2.31)	28.8 (1.13)	1,243.4 (48.95)
Average precipitation days (≥ 0.1 mm)	11.6	8.6	11.6	15.3	17.8	16.7	10.4	10.4	15.8	17.4	13.2	13.4	162.2
Average snowy days	0.6	0.4	0	0	0	0	0	0	0	0	0	0.1	1.1
Average relative humidity (%)	83	78	74	74	77	80	72	68	82	86	87	86	79
Mean monthly sunshine hours	31.5	41.3	88.8	122.5	118.6	106.9	201.6	213.7	80.1	55.6	39.3	32.2	1,132.1
Percentage possible sunshine	10	13	24	32	28	26	47	53	22	16	12	10	24
Source: China Meteorological Administration All-time Oct high

== Transportation ==
- China National Highway 210

=== Metro ===
Banan is currently served by two metro lines operated by Chongqing Rail Transit:

- Line 2 - Dajiang, Yudong
- Line 3 - Yudong, Jinzhu, Yuhulu, Xuetangwan, Dashancun, Chaoyouchang, Chalukou, Jiugongli, Qilong, Bagongli
