= Huaxi Subdistrict, Chongqing =

Huaxi Subdistrict 花溪街道
- Subdistrict
- Location in Chongqing
- Coordinates: 29°27′30″N 106°32′23″E
- Country: People's Republic of China
- Direct-administered municipality: Chongqing
- District: Banan District
- Time zone: UTC+8 (China Standard)

Huaxi Subdistrict (Chinese: 花溪街道; pinyin: Huāxī Jiēdào) is a subdistrict in Banan District, Chongqing, China. As of 2018, it has 18 residential communities and 6 villages under its administration.

== See also ==
- List of township-level divisions of Chongqing
