= Geka Township, Daocheng County =

Geka Township 各卡乡
- Township
- Gekaxiang
- Location in Sichuan
- Coordinates: 28°15′36″N 100°11′50″E
- Country: People's Republic of China
- Province: Sichuan
- Autonomous prefecture: Garzê Tibetan Autonomous Prefecture
- County: Daocheng County

Area
  - Total: 620.1 km^{2} (239.4 sq mi)

Population (2010)
  - Total: 806
  - Density: 1.30/km^{2} (3.37/sq mi)
- Time zone: UTC+8 (China Standard)

Geka (Chinese: 各卡乡) is a township in Daocheng County, Garzê Tibetan Autonomous Prefecture, Sichuan, China. In 2010, Geka Township had a total population of 806: 396 males and 410 females: 174 aged under 14, 566 aged between 15 and 65 and 66 aged over 65.
