= Huaxi station =

Metro station in Chongqing, China

Huaxi 花溪
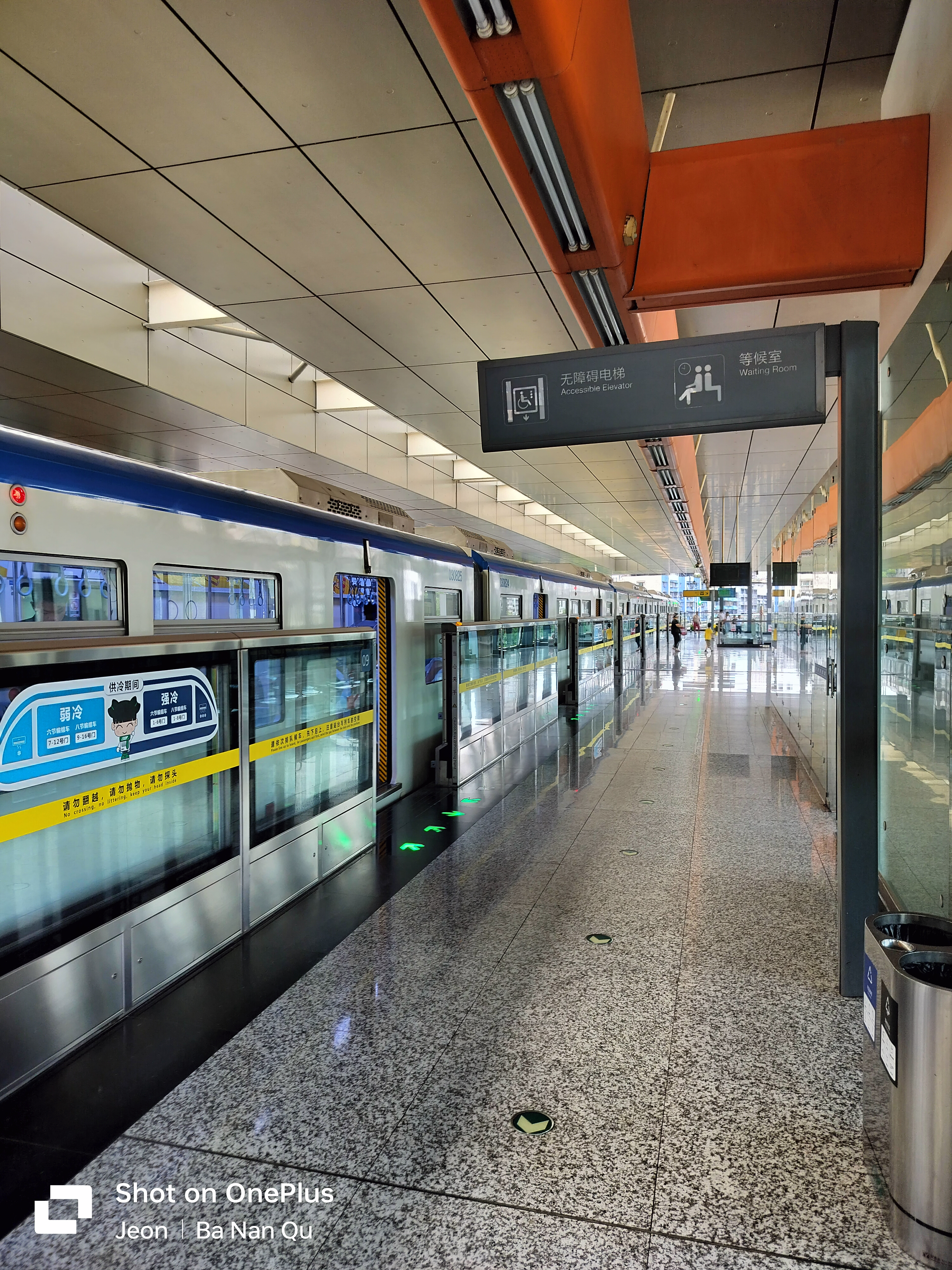

General information
- Location: Chongqing; China
- Operated by: Chongqing Rail Transit Corp., Ltd
- Line: Line 3
- Platforms: 2 side platforms

Construction
- Structure type: Elevated

Other information
- Station code: 3/06

History
- Opened: 31 January 2013

Services
Preceding station	Chongqing Rail Transit	Following station
Dashancun towards Yudong	Line 3	Chalukou towards Terminal 2 of Jiangbei Airport
Location

Huaxi is a station on Line 3 of Chongqing Rail Transit in Chongqing Municipality, China. It is located in Banan District. It opened as an infill station in 2013.

== Station structure ==
3F; Platforms	Side platform
3F; Platforms	Line 3 to Yudong (Dashancun)
3F; Platforms	Line 3 to Terminal 2 of Jiangbei Airport (Chalukou)
3F; Platforms	Side platform
2F; Concourse	Exits, Customer service, Vending machines, Toilets
