= Mula Township, Sichuan =

Mula Township 木拉乡
- Township
- Mulaxiang
- Location in Sichuan
- Coordinates: 28°44′12″N 100°12′54″E
- Country: People's Republic of China
- Province: Sichuan
- Autonomous prefecture: Garzê Tibetan Autonomous Prefecture
- County: Daocheng County

Area
  - Total: 734.5 km^{2} (283.6 sq mi)

Population (2010)
  - Total: 1,775
  - Density: 2.417/km^{2} (6.259/sq mi)
- Time zone: UTC+8 (China Standard)

Mula (Mandarin: 木拉乡) is a township in Daocheng County, Garzê Tibetan Autonomous Prefecture, Sichuan, China. In 2010, Mula Township had a total population of 1,775: 910 males and 865 females: 461 aged under 14, 1,922 aged between 15 and 65 and 122 aged over 65.
