= Chalukou station =

Metro station in Chongqing, China

Chalukou 岔路口
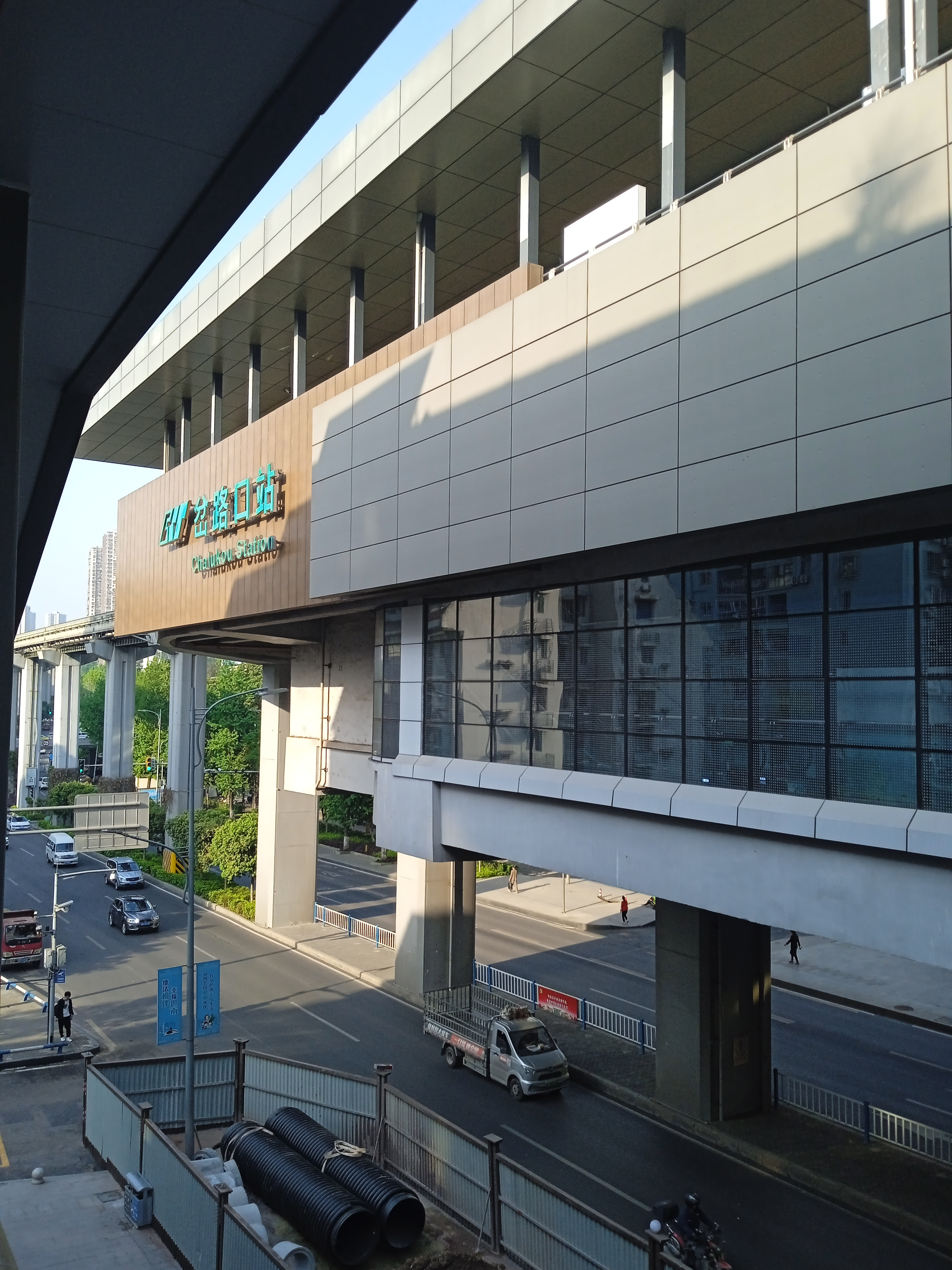

General information
- Location: Chongqing; China
- Operated by: Chongqing Rail Transit Corp., Ltd
- Line: Line 3
- Platforms: 2 side platforms

Construction
- Structure type: Elevated

Other information
- Station code: 3/07

History
- Opened: 31 January 2013

Services
| Preceding station | Chongqing Rail Transit | Following station |
|---|---|---|
| Huaxi towards Yudong | Line 3 | Jiugongli towards Terminal 2 of Jiangbei Airport |
Location

Chalukou is a station on Line 3 of Chongqing Rail Transit in Chongqing Municipality, China. It is located in Banan District. It opened as an infill station in 2013.

== Station structure ==
| 3F; Platforms | Side platform |
| 3F; Platforms | Line 3 to Yudong (Huaxi) |
| 3F; Platforms | Line 3 to Terminal 2 of Jiangbei Airport (Jiugongli) |
| 3F; Platforms | Side platform |
| 2F; Concourse | Exits, Customer service, Vending machines, Toilets |
