= Holy Mother =

Holy Mother may refer to:

- Holy mother of Christ, an honorific of the Blessed Virgin Mary
- Mother church, a title of the Christian Church in Roman Catholicism
- "Holy Mother", a 1986 song by Eric Clapton from August
- 聖母, an honorific for an empress dowager, mother of an emperor
- Sri Maa, honorific of Sarada Devi (1853–1920)
- "Holy Mother" (Fullmetal Alchemist episode), a 2004 anime
- ཇོ་མོ་གླང་མ། (Quomolangma), Tibetan name for Mount Everest
- Holy Mother (film), a 2024 Spanish-Belgian historical drama film
- Munírih Khánum, the wife of ʻAbdu'l-Bahá, a prominent figure in the Baháʼí Faith
- Seongmo

== See also ==
- Heavenly Mother
- Mother goddess, a deity representing nature, motherhood, or the bounty of the Earth
- 聖母 (disambiguation)
