= Jiugongli station =

Metro station in Chongqing, China

Jiugongli 九公里
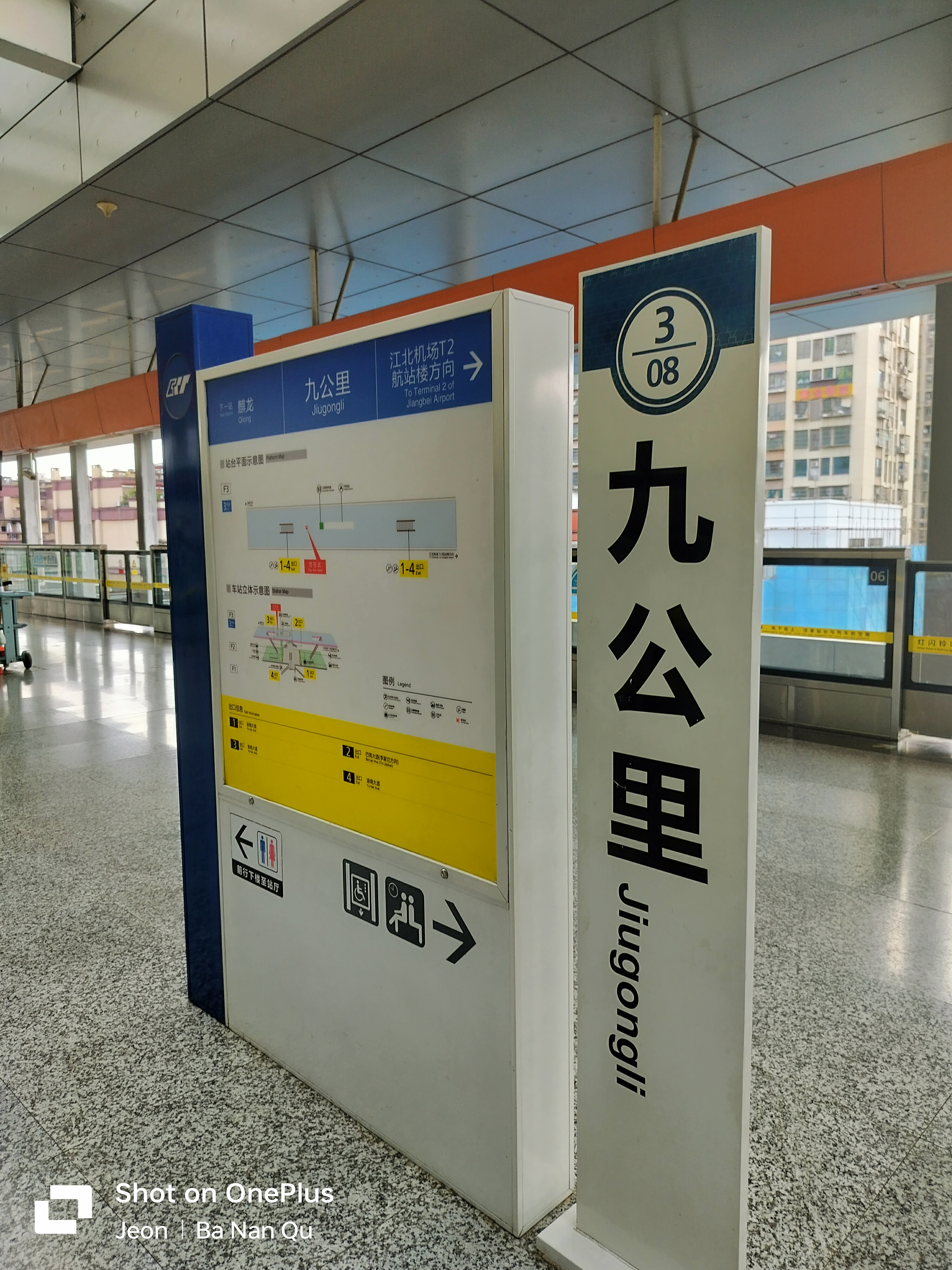

General information
- Location: Chongqing; China
- Operated by: Chongqing Rail Transit Corp., Ltd
- Line: Line 3
- Platforms: 2 (1 island platform)

Construction
- Structure type: Elevated

Other information
- Station code: 3/08

History
- Opened: 28 December 2012

Services
| Preceding station | Chongqing Rail Transit | Following station |
|---|---|---|
| Chalukou towards Yudong | Line 3 | Qilong towards Terminal 2 of Jiangbei Airport |
Location

Jiugongli station (Chinese: 九公里站; pinyin: Jiǔgōnglǐ zhàn) is a station on Line 3 of Chongqing Rail Transit in Chongqing Municipality, China. It is located in Banan District. It opened in 2012.

== Station structure ==
| 3F; Platforms | Line 3 to Yudong (Chalukou) |
| 3F; Platforms | Island platform |
| 3F; Platforms | Line 3 to Terminal 2 of Jiangbei Airport (Qilong) |
| 2F; Concourse | Exits, Customer service, Vending machines, Toilets |
