= Xuetangwan station =

Metro station in Chongqing, China

Xuetangwan 学堂湾

General information
- Location: Chongqing; China
- Coordinates: 29.40095°N 106.53935°E
- Operated by: Chongqing Rail Transit Corp., Ltd
- Line: Line 3
- Platforms: 2 side platforms

Construction
- Structure type: Elevated

Other information
- Station code: 3/04

History
- Opened: 28 December 2012

Services
Preceding station	Chongqing Rail Transit	Following station
Yuhulu towards Yudong	Line 3	Dashancun towards Terminal 2 of Jiangbei Airport
Location

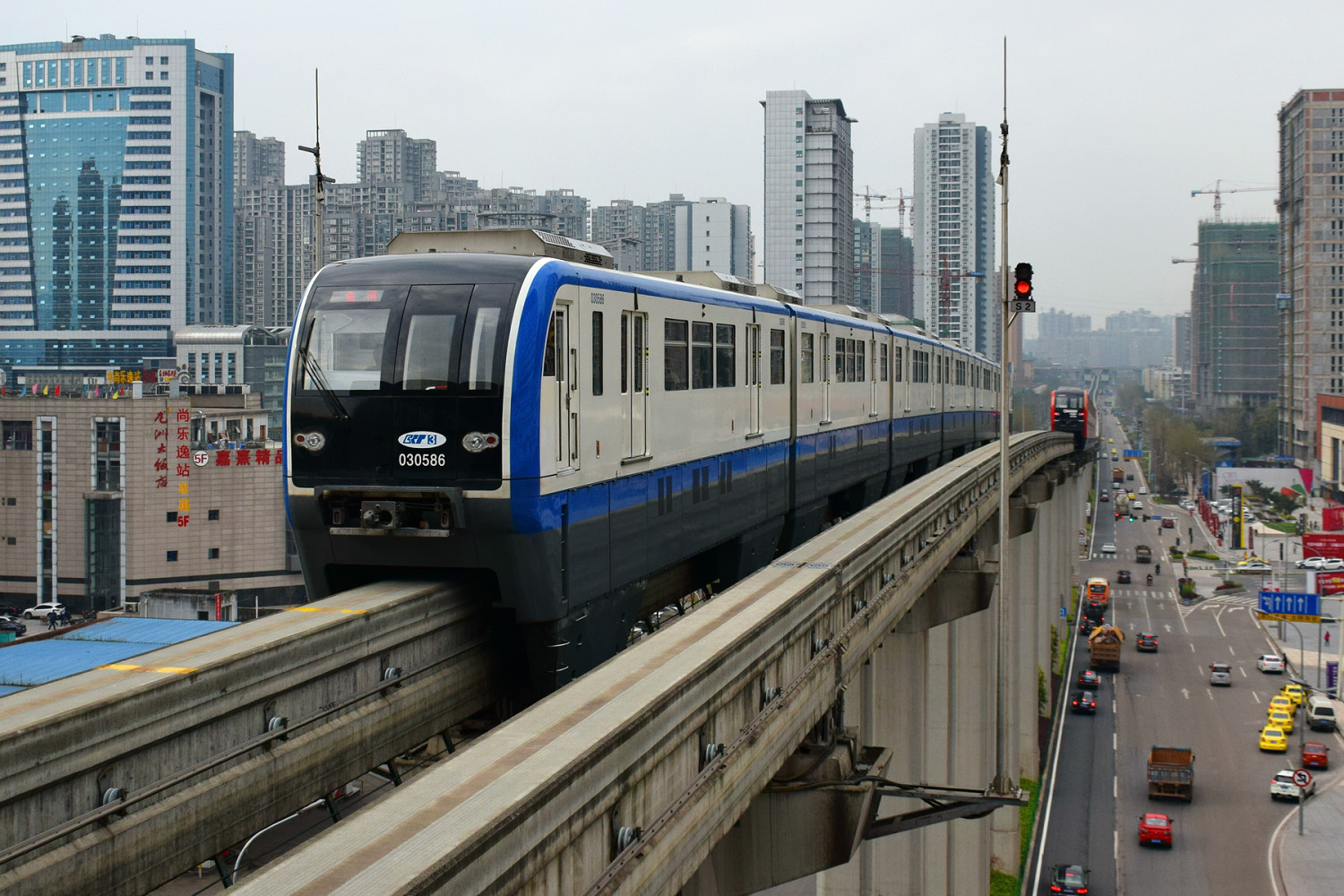
A Chongqing Rail Transit Line 3 Monorail Train was entering Xuetangwan Station

Xuetangwan is a station on Line 3 of Chongqing Rail Transit in Chongqing Municipality, China. It is located in Banan District. It opened in 2012.

== Station structure ==
3F; Platforms	Side platform
3F; Platforms	Line 3 to Yudong (Yuhulu)
3F; Platforms	Line 3 to Terminal 2 of Jiangbei Airport (Dashancun)
3F; Platforms	Side platform
2F; Concourse	Exits, Customer service, Vending machines, Toilets
