= Daocheng County =

Daocheng County 稻城县 · འདབ་པ་རྫོང་། Dapba, Dabba, Daoba
- County
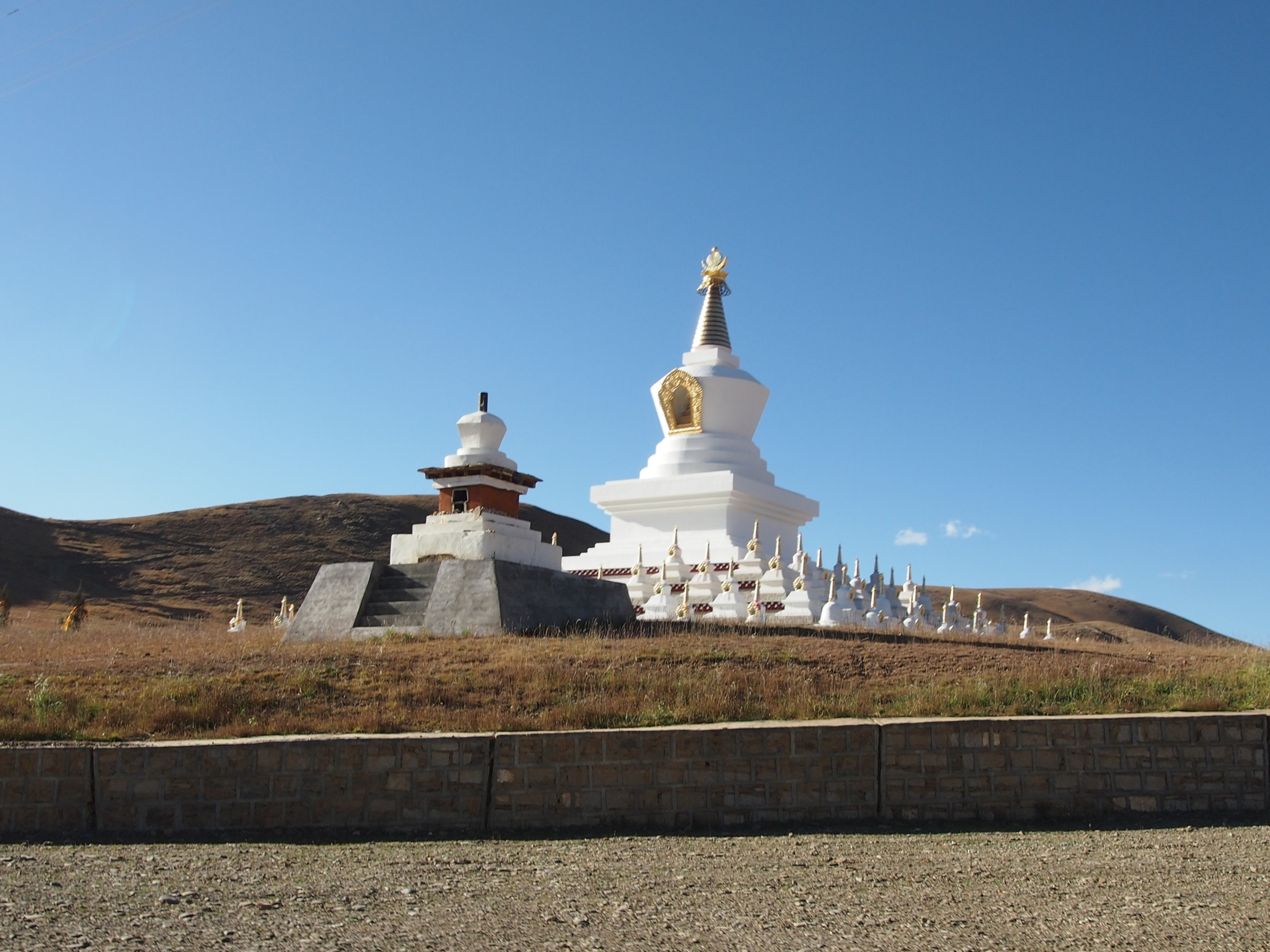
- White Pagoda in Daocheng County

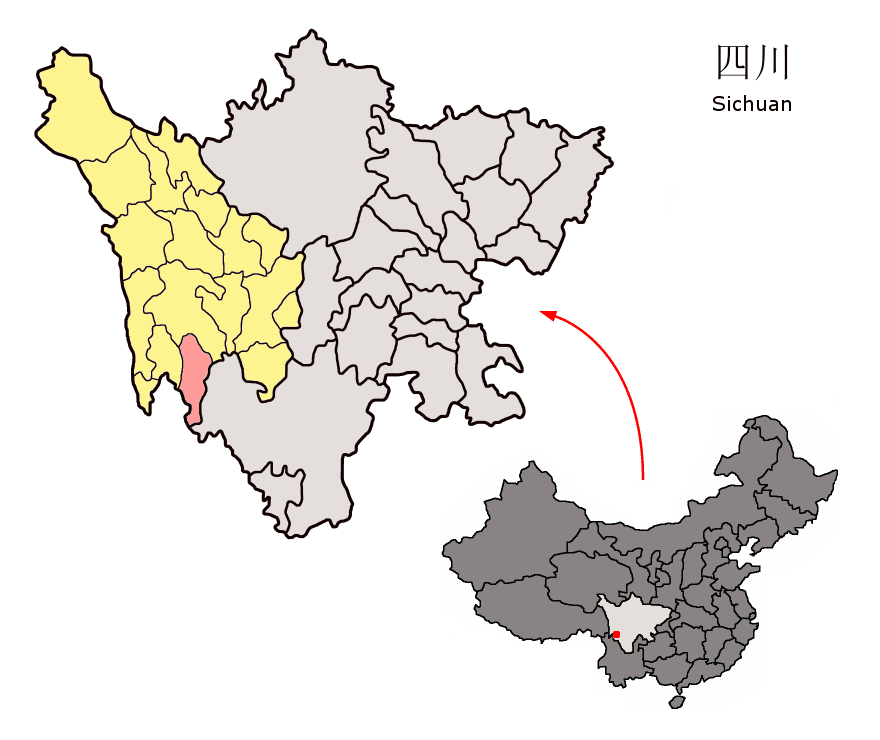
- Daocheng County (red) within Garzê Prefecture (yellow) and Sichuan

- Location of the seat in Sichuan Daocheng (China)
- Coordinates (Daocheng government): 29°02′16″N 100°17′51″E
- Country: China
- Province: Sichuan
- Autonomous prefecture: Garzê
- County seat: Jingzhoi (Jinzhu)

Area
  - Total: 7,323 km^{2} (2,827 sq mi)
- Elevation: 3,753 m (12,313 ft)

Population (2020)
  - Total: 32,916
  - Density: 4.495/km^{2} (11.64/sq mi)
- Time zone: UTC+8 (China Standard)
- Website: www.daocheng.gov.cn

Daocheng County

Chinese name
- Simplified Chinese: 稻城县
- Traditional Chinese: 稻城縣
Transcriptions
Standard Mandarin
- Hanyu Pinyin: Dàochéng Xiàn

Historical Chinese name
- Simplified Chinese: 稻坝
- Traditional Chinese: 稻壩
Transcriptions
Standard Mandarin
- Hanyu Pinyin: Dàobà

Tibetan name
- Tibetan: འདབ་པ་རྫོང་།
Transcriptions
- Wylie: ʻdab pa rdzong
- Tibetan Pinyin: Dabba Zong

Daocheng County or Dapba in Tibetan (Tibetan: འདབ་པ་རྫོང་།; Chinese: 稻城县) is a county of western Sichuan Province, China, located in the eastern Hengduan Mountains. It is under the administration of the Garzê Tibetan Autonomous Prefecture with an overwhelmingly Tibetan population. Its latitude ranges from 27° 58' to 29° 30' N and longitude 99° 56' to 100° 36', and reaches 174 kilometres (108 mi) in north–south extent and 63 km (39 mi) in east–west width, with elevations ranging from 2,000 to 6,032 m (6,562 to 19,790 ft).

Daocheng Yading Airport, the world's highest airport, is located in Daocheng County.

== History ==
The explorer Joseph Rock departed from Lijiang in 1928 and visited Daocheng.

After the fall of the Qing dynasty, Xiangcheng and Daocheng fell into chaos. Daocheng was controlled by local chiefs centered in Daoba and the Gangkarling (贡噶岭; Gònggálǐng) region from 1930s to 1950s.

== Administrative Divisions ==
Daocheng County is divided into 5 towns and 8 townships.

Name	Simplified Chinese	Hanyu Pinyin	Tibetan	Wylie	Administrative division code
Towns
Jingzhoi Town (Jinzhu)	金珠镇	Jīnzhū Zhèn	བཅིངས་འགྲོལ་གྲོང་རྡལ།	bcings 'grol grong rdal	513337100
Shambala Town (Xambala, Xianggelila)	香格里拉镇	Xiānggélǐlā Zhèn	ཤམ་བྷ་ལ་གྲོང་རྡལ།	sham bha la grong rdal	513337101
Sumdü Town (Sangdui)	桑堆镇	Sāngduī Zhèn	གསུམ་འདུས་གྲོང་རྡལ།	gsum 'dus grong rdal	513337102
Qugar Town (Jiga)	吉呷镇	Jígā Zhèn	ཆུ་དཀར་གྲོང་རྡལ།	chu dkar grong rdal	513337103
Gartang Town (Gatong)	噶通镇	Gátōng Zhèn	སྐར་ཐང་གྲོང་རྡལ།	skar thang grong rdal	513337104
Townships
Sammo Township (Shengmu)	省母乡	Shěngmǔ Xiāng	བསམ་མོ་ཤང་།	bsam mo shang	513337201
Jangrong Township (Julong)	巨龙乡	Jùlóng Xiāng	འཇང་རོང་ཤང་།	'jang rong shang	513337204
Dêmo Township (Dengpo)	邓坡乡	Dèngpō Xiāng	བདེ་མོ་ཤང་།	bde mo shang	513337205
Mangra Township (Mula)	木拉乡	Mùlā Xiāng	མང་ར་ཤང་།	mang ra shang	513337206
Qêrog Township (Chitu)	赤土乡	Chìtǔ Xiāng	ཆེ་རོགས་ཤང་།	che rogs shang	513337207
Bucang Township (Mengzi)	蒙自乡	Méngzì Xiāng	འབུ་ཚང་ཤང་།	'bu tshang shang	513337209
Kaqa Township (Gaqag, Geka)	各卡乡	Gèkǎ Xiāng	ག་ཆ་ཤང་།	ga cha shang	513337210
Goyagtang Township (Goyatang, Eyatong)	俄牙同乡	Éyátóng Xiāng	འགོ་ཡག་ཐང་ཤང་།	'go yag thang shang	513337212

== Climate ==
Daocheng has a Monsoon-influenced warm-summer humid continental climate (Dwb) according to the Köppen Climate classification, with humid and rainy and warm summers, and cold and dry winters due to the high pressure that forms over the Tibetan Plateau during those months. Snowfall is most common during spring and autumn, as there is little precipitation during winter.

Climate data for Daocheng, elevation 3,728 m (12,231 ft), (1991–2020 normals, extremes 1981–present)
Month	Jan	Feb	Mar	Apr	May	Jun	Jul	Aug	Sep	Oct	Nov	Dec	Year
Record high °C (°F)	18.7 (65.7)	18.7 (65.7)	23.5 (74.3)	23.7 (74.7)	25.2 (77.4)	27.0 (80.6)	27.9 (82.2)	24.9 (76.8)	23.9 (75.0)	21.5 (70.7)	19.0 (66.2)	17.2 (63.0)	27.9 (82.2)
Mean daily maximum °C (°F)	6.3 (43.3)	7.8 (46.0)	10.3 (50.5)	13.6 (56.5)	17.4 (63.3)	19.7 (67.5)	18.6 (65.5)	18.2 (64.8)	17.5 (63.5)	14.6 (58.3)	10.6 (51.1)	7.8 (46.0)	13.5 (56.4)
Daily mean °C (°F)	−4.1 (24.6)	−1.9 (28.6)	1.5 (34.7)	5.4 (41.7)	9.8 (49.6)	12.7 (54.9)	12.4 (54.3)	11.9 (53.4)	10.7 (51.3)	6.3 (43.3)	0.7 (33.3)	−3.2 (26.2)	5.2 (41.3)
Mean daily minimum °C (°F)	−12.5 (9.5)	−10.0 (14.0)	−5.7 (21.7)	−1.8 (28.8)	2.8 (37.0)	7.2 (45.0)	8.3 (46.9)	7.9 (46.2)	6.2 (43.2)	0.2 (32.4)	−6.7 (19.9)	−11.4 (11.5)	−1.3 (29.7)
Record low °C (°F)	−26.5 (−15.7)	−23.6 (−10.5)	−18.4 (−1.1)	−10.4 (13.3)	−6.7 (19.9)	−1.7 (28.9)	0.1 (32.2)	−0.1 (31.8)	−3.0 (26.6)	−10.2 (13.6)	−21.0 (−5.8)	−27.6 (−17.7)	−27.6 (−17.7)
Average precipitation mm (inches)	1.3 (0.05)	2.0 (0.08)	7.2 (0.28)	14.0 (0.55)	39.5 (1.56)	116.2 (4.57)	193.8 (7.63)	162.7 (6.41)	97.7 (3.85)	20.2 (0.80)	4.6 (0.18)	0.9 (0.04)	660.1 (26)
Average precipitation days (≥ 0.1 mm)	1.7	1.4	5.0	7.3	10.2	18.2	24.8	23.8	17.8	6.4	2.3	1.0	119.9
Average snowy days	4.0	5.2	10.1	9.9	2.6	0.3	0.1	0	0.3	2.7	4.0	2.5	41.7
Average relative humidity (%)	37	38	43	47	51	63	74	75	71	60	48	39	54
Mean monthly sunshine hours	261.2	244.8	247.8	230.1	219.8	171.6	130.7	136.4	167.7	227.7	244.8	262.0	2,544.6
Percentage possible sunshine	80	77	66	59	52	41	31	34	46	65	77	82	59
Source: China Meteorological Administrationall-time Septemeber record high
