= Shengmu Township =

Shengmu Township 省母乡
- Township
- Location in Sichuan
- Coordinates: 29°2′52″N 100°24′44″E
- Country: People's Republic of China
- Province: Sichuan
- Autonomous Prefecture: Garzê Tibetan Autonomous Prefecture
- County: Daocheng County
- Village-level divisions: 6 villages
- Time zone: UTC+8 (China Standard)

Shengmu Township (simplified Chinese: 省母乡; traditional Chinese: 省母鄉; pinyin: Shěngmǔ Xiāng) or Sammo Township (Tibetan: བསམ་མོ་ཤང་།) is a township of Daocheng County in western Sichuan province, China. As of 2023, it has six villages under its administration: Shengmu Village, Ranzi Village (冉子村), Zhahua Village (查花村), Gewa Village (各瓦村), Rihuo Village (日火村), and Xiepo Village (协坡村).

== See also ==
- List of township-level divisions of Sichuan
