= Jinzhu, Sichuan =

Coordinates: 29°02′28″N 100°18′18″E

Jinzhu
- Town

Tibetan transcription(s)

Chinese transcription(s)
- Interactive map of Jinzhu
- Country: China
- Province: Sichuan
- Prefecture: Garzê Tibetan Autonomous Prefecture
- Time zone: UTC+8 (CST)

Jinzhu (Chinese: 金珠镇; pinyin: Jīnzhū Zhèn; Tibetan: བཅིངས་འགྲོལ་གྲོང་རྡལ།, Wylie: bcings vgrol grong rdal) is a town which is the county seat of Daocheng County, in the Garzê Tibetan Autonomous Prefecture of Sichuan, China.
