= Jinzhu station =

Railway station in Chongqing, China

Jinzhu 金竹
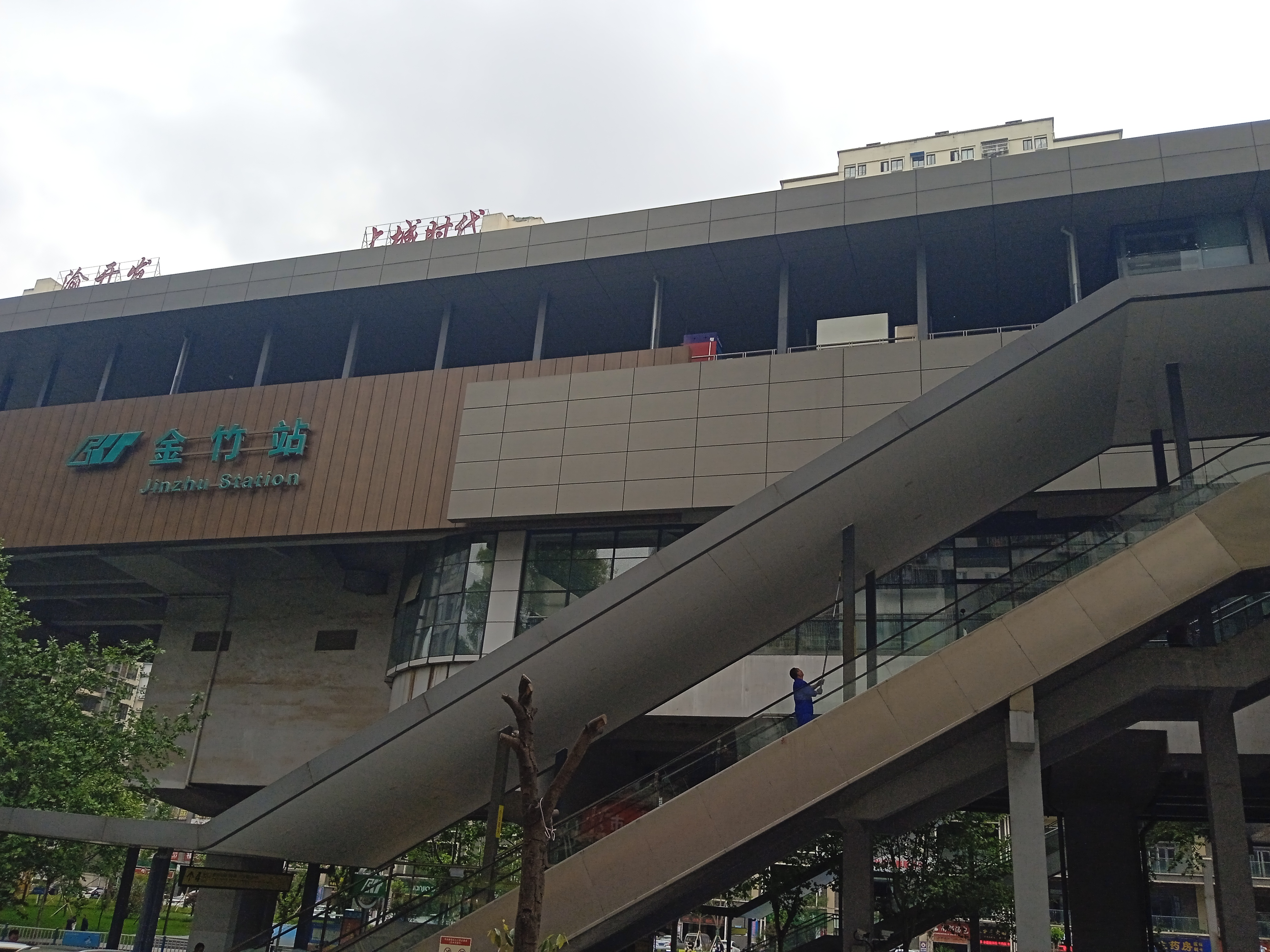

General information
- Location: Chongqing; China
- Coordinates: 29.37847°N 106.52004°E
- Operated by: Chongqing Rail Transit Corp., Ltd
- Line: Line 3
- Platforms: 2 side platforms

Construction
- Structure type: Elevated

Other information
- Station code: /

History
- Opened: 31 January 2013

Services
Preceding station	Chongqing Rail Transit	Following station
Yudong Terminus	Line 3	Yuhulu towards Terminal 2 of Jiangbei Airport
Location

Jinzhu is a station on Line 3 of Chongqing Rail Transit in Chongqing Municipality, China. It is located in Banan District. It opened as an infill station in 2013.

== Station structure ==
3F; Platforms	Side platform
3F; Platforms	Line 3 to Yudong (Terminus)
3F; Platforms	Line 3 to Terminal 2 of Jiangbei Airport (Yuhulu)
3F; Platforms	Side platform
2F; Concourse	Exits, Customer service, Vending machines, Toilets
